= State Highway 4 (Karnataka) =

State highway in Karnataka, India

State Highway 4

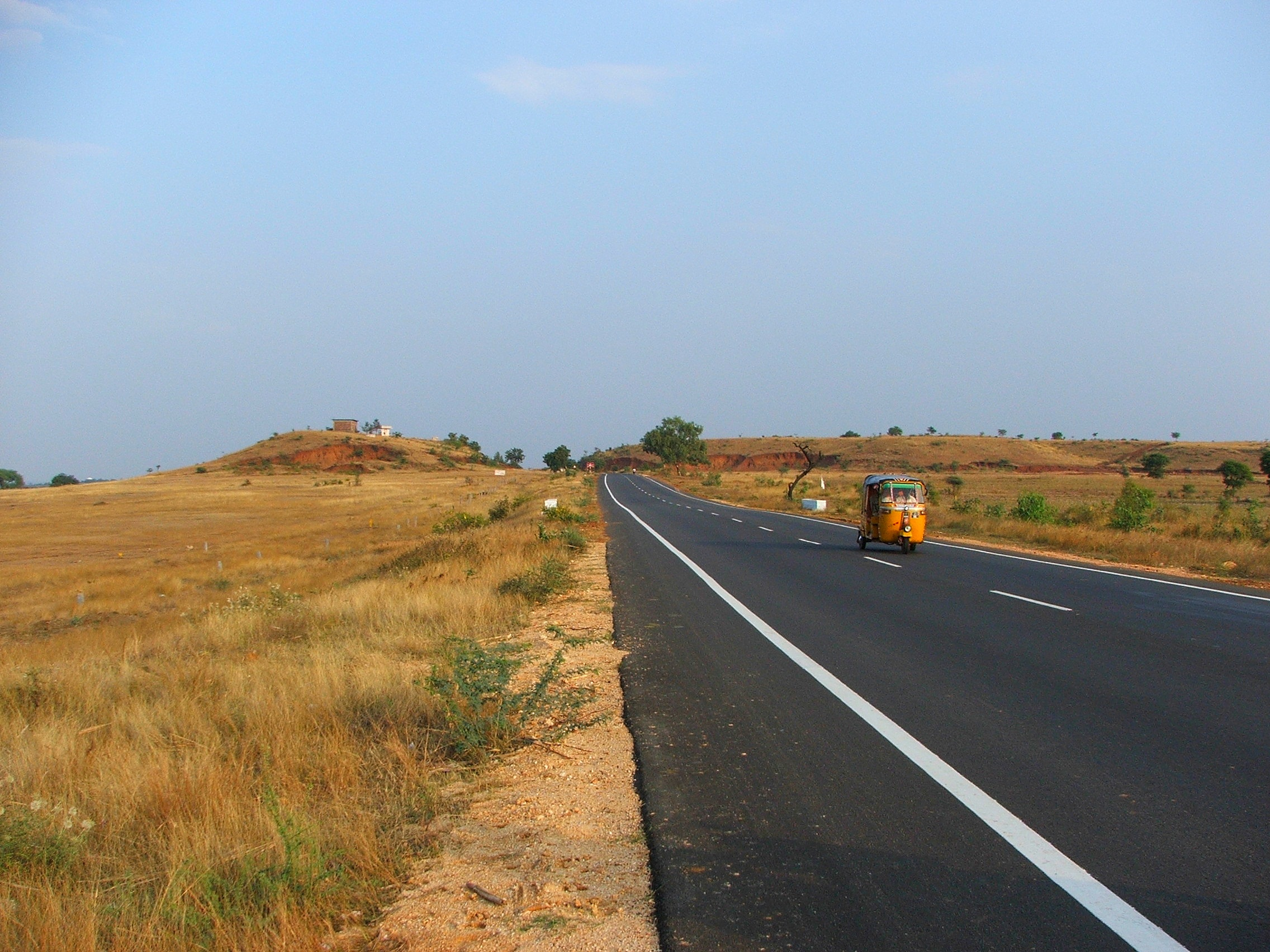

Route information
- Maintained by Karnataka Public Works Department; Ministry of Public Works Department (Karnataka)
- Length: 69 km (43 mi)

Major junctions
- North end: Kamalnagar,
- South end: Gunalli, Bidar taluka

Location
- Country: India
- State: Karnataka
- Districts: Bidar district
- Major cities: Bidar, Kamalnagar, Halbarga, Gunalli
- Primary destinations: Bidar

Highway system
- Roads in India; Expressways; National; State; Asian; State Highways in Karnataka

Karnataka State Highway 4, commonly referred to as KA SH 4, is a state highway road that runs south through in Bidar district in the state of Karnataka. This state highway touches numerous cities and villages Viz.Halbarga, Bidar. The total length of the highway is 69 kilometres (43 miles).

== Route description ==
The route followed by this highway is Kamalnagar – Halbarga – Bidar – Gunalli.

== Major junctions ==
=== State highways ===
- KA SH 15 and KA SH 105 in Bidar district

== Connections ==
Many villages, cities and towns in various districts are connected by this state highway.

== See also ==
- List of state highways in Karnataka
