= Belura =

- village
- Location in Karnataka, India Belura (India)
- Coordinates: 17.86°N 76.95°E
- Country: India
- State: Karnataka
- District: Bidar
- Talukas: Basavakalyan

Government
  - Body: Gram panchayat

Population (2001)
  - Total: 5,857

Languages
  - Official: Kannada
- Time zone: UTC+5:30 (IST)
- ISO 3166 code: IN-KA
- Vehicle registration: KA
- Website: karnataka.gov.in

Belura is a village in the southern state of Karnataka, India. It is located in the Basavakalyan taluk of Bidar district and falls under the Hulsoor police jurisdiction.

== Demographics ==
As of 2001 India census, Belura had a population of 5,857, with 2,921 males and 2,936 females.

== See also ==
- Bidar
- Districts of Karnataka
