= Basavaraj Patil Attur =

Indian politician

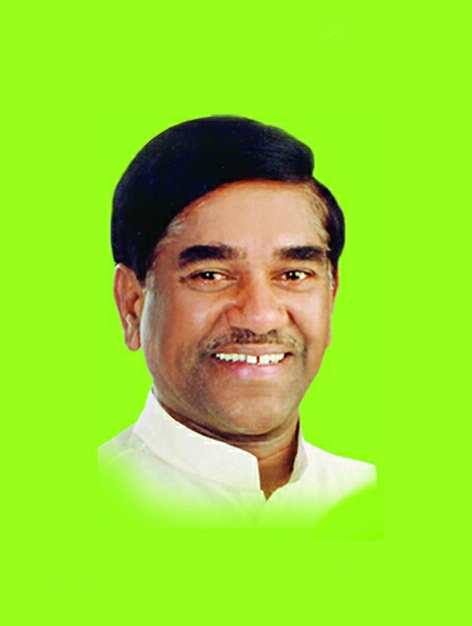

Minister of Minor Irrigation of Karnataka
- In office 16 February 1986 – 29 June 1986

Member of the Karnataka Legislative Assembly
- In office 1985–1999
- Preceded by: Basawaraj Shankarappa Patil
- Succeeded by: M. G. Muley
- In office 2008–2013
- Preceded by: Mallikarjun Khuba
- Succeeded by: Mallikarjun Khuba
- Constituency: Basavakalyan

Personal details
- Born: 19 September 1952 (age 73) Atturu
- Party: Karnataka Janata Paksha
- Other political affiliations: Janata Party (1985-1989); Janata Dal (1989-1999); Bharatiya Janata Party (2008-2013)

Basavaraj Patil Atturu is an Indian politician who was the Minister of Minor Irrigation of Karnataka from 16 February 1986 to 29 June 1986. He was the member of the Karnataka Legislative Assembly from 1985 to 1999 and from 2008 to 2013.

Basavaraj Patil Attur was born in Attur, a village in Basavakalyan Taluk of Bidar District on 19 September 1952. His parents Shri Shankereppa Patil and Smt Gurlingamma Patil were the landlords and were popular among the locals for philanthropical deeds. After his graduation in B.A. from Karnataka University he was drawn to politics. He was elected as TDB member (Taluk Development Board) in 1978.

He contested Assembly seat of Basavakalyan in 1983 and emerged victorious in his very first attempt. He served as a Member of Legislative Assembly from 1983 to 1999 and from 2008 to 2013. In his political career spanning over 35 years he served three times as a minister. He was minister for minor irrigation in Ramakrishna Hegde's government. He served as a cabinet minister in J. H. Patel's government. He was given the portfolios of Higher Education and later the portfolio of Small Scale Industries.

He is also the Founder President of Basavakalyan Educational Trust which runs Basavakalyan Engineering College. He was awarded the best Citizen of India Award in 2002 by Delhi-based Publication House in the category of social service.
