= Halbarga =

- Village
- Location of Halbarga in Karnataka Halbarga (India)
- Coordinates: 17.994°N 77.326°E
- Country: India
- State: Karnataka
- Region: Bayaluseeme
- District: Bidar

Government
  - Type: Panchayati raj (India)
  - Body: Gram panchayat

Languages
  - Official: Kannada
- Time zone: UTC+5:30 (IST)
- PIN: 585413
- ISO 3166 code: IN-KA
- Vehicle registration: KA 39
- Website: karnataka.gov.in

Halbarga is a village in Bhalki taluka of Bidar district in the Indian state of Karnataka. At the 2011 national census date, Halbarga had a population of 3,242 and a total area of 928.8 hectares.

Halbarga is about 13 km (8.1 mi) from Bhalki, 23 km (14 miles) from Bidar, and 140 km (87 mi) from Hyderabad in the Indian state of Telangana.

The Capuchins established a mission in Halbarga in 2000 and a house and chapel were inaugurated in 2007 by Rt. Rev. Robert Miranda, bishop of the Roman Catholic Diocese of Gulbarga. A school was opened in an existing building on the site in 2010. A new building for the Anugraha English Medium School was inaugurated in September 2019, "Anugraha" meaning divine blessing.
