= Bagdal =

- village
- Location in Karnataka, India Bagdal (India)
- Coordinates: 17.91°N 77.53°E
- Country: India
- State: Karnataka
- District: Bidar
- Talukas: Bidar

Government
  - Type: Gram
  - Body: Panchayat of Bagdal

Area
  - Total: 20.62 km^{2} (7.96 sq mi)
  - Rank: 2nd populas village

Population (2001)
  - Total: 8,952
  - Density: 412/km^{2} (1,070/sq mi)
- Demonym: Bagdalkar

Languages
  - Official: Kannada
- Time zone: UTC+5:30 (IST)
- Pin code: 585226
- Vehicle registration: KA 38

Bagdal is a small town in Bidar taluka of Bidar district in the Indian state of Karnataka.

== Demographics ==
As of 2001 the India census, Bagdal had a population of 8,952, with 4,614 males and 4,338 females.

== See also ==
- Districts of Karnataka
