= Srimandal =

Villages in Bidar district, Karnataka

Coordinates: 18°01′53″N 77°33′15″E

Srimandal or Sirimandal, is a village in Bidar taluk of Bidar district in the state of Karnataka, India. The village has population of 1,548 people as per 2011 Census of India.

== Recognition ==
In 2025, Srimandal gram panchayat was awarded the Gandhi Gram Puraskar by the Department of Rural development and Panchayat Raj, Government of Karnataka.
