= Mirkhal =

Mirkhal Mirkhal
- village
- Location in Karnataka, India Mirkhal (India)
- Coordinates: 17.86°N 76.95°E
- Country: India
- State: Karnataka
- District: Bidar
- Talukas: Basavakalyan

Government
  - Type: Gram
  - Body: Panchayat of Mirkhal

Area
  - Total: 32 km^{2} (12 sq mi)
  - Rank: 4th (Basavakalyan Taluka)

Population (2011)
  - Total: 6,422
  - Rank: 5th (Basavakalyan Taluka)
  - Density: 201/km^{2} (520/sq mi)
- Demonym: Mirkhalkar

Languages
  - Official: Kannada, marathi
- Time zone: UTC+5:30 (IST)
- Pin Code: 585416

Mirkhal is a village in the southern state of Karnataka, India. It is located in the Basavakalyan taluk of Bidar district.

== Demographics ==
As of 2001 India census, Mirkhal had a population of 5690 with 2910 males and 2780 females.

== See also ==
- Bidar
- Districts of Karnataka
