= Bembra =

Village in Karnataka, India

- Village
- Interactive map of Bembra
- Coordinates: 18°12′16.81″N 77°19′27.89″E
- Country: India
- State: Karnataka
- District: Bidar
- Taluka: Kamalnagar

Government
  - Body: Gram Panchayath

Area
  - Total: 5.08 km^{2} (1.96 sq mi)

Population (2020)
  - Total: 987
  - Density: 204/km^{2} (530/sq mi)

Bembra is a village in the Kamalnagar Taluka of the Bidar district in the Indian state of Karnataka. It is also known as Bembri in the Kannada language. The village is occupied mostly by Maratha peoples, along with a Lingayats community

== Geography ==
Bembra is 5 km from Thana Kushnoor, which has a busy transport facility; 18 km from Aurad Taluka; 25 km from Taluka Bhalki, 40 km from Udgir, and 44 km from Bidar.

== Teacher's Village ==
Bembra village has a number of teachers who work in the educational sector.
