= Chintaki =

Village in Karnataka, India

- Village
- Interactive map of Chintaki
- Location in Karnataka, India
- Coordinates: 18.220922°N 77.541645°E
- Country: India
- State: Karnataka
- District: Bidar district
- Taluka: Aurad taluka

Area
  - Total: 15.406 km^{2} (5.948 sq mi)

Population (2011)
  - Total: 3,557

Demographics
  - Sex ratio: 938 ♀/1000 ♂
- PIN Code: 585326
- Vehicle registration: KA38

Chintaki is a village in the Aurad Taluka of the Bidar district in the state of Karnataka, India. In April 2026, the temperature in the town reached 46° C, the highest ever recorded in the state.

== Demographics ==
The 2011 census population 3,557 people. Of these, 1,835 were men and 1,722 were women, or roughly 938 women for every 1,000 men. The village had 623 households and covered 15.406 square kilometres. There were 543 children under seven: 274 boys and 269 girls.

== Geography and climate ==
Chintaki sits on the northern Deccan Plateau, the summers can get very hot and dry. On 29 April 2026, the temperature reached 46° C according to the Karnataka State Natural Disaster Monitor Centre, the highest temperature the state had ever seen.

== Education ==
The 2011 census found several schools in Chintaki: one pre-primary, four primary, two middle and two secondary schools.

== Healthcare ==
Chintaki has a Primary Health Centre. In October 2021, the centre got a National Quality Assurance Standards certificate from the Central Quality Supervisory Committee. The certificate was valid for three years. It recognized the centre's work in patient care, infection control, and other areas. It also came with an annual grant of ₹3 lakh from the central government.

== Administration ==
Chintaki is run by a village panchayat. The panchayat falls under the Aurad taluka panchayat and Bidar Zilla panchayat.

During the 2016 demonetisation, the panchayat decided to accept the old ₹500 and ₹1000 notes for tax payments. Shivanand Aurade, the Panchayat Development Officer, organised the drive. His team went door-to-door and set up a counter outside the State Bank of Hyderabad branch.

== Notable events ==
The funeral of Gurupadappa Nagamarapalli was held in Chintaki on 18 November 2015. Nagamarapalli was a former minister and well known as co-operative leader. He received a state funeral, which included a three-gun salute. The burial took place on his family farm at the edge of the village. Two former Chief Ministers Jagadish Shettar and N. Dharam Singh, were among those who attended the event.

== See also ==
- Aurad
- Bidar district
