= Papnash Shiva Temple =

12th-century temple in Karnataka, India

- ಪಾಪನಾಶ ಶಿವ ದೇವಾಲಯ
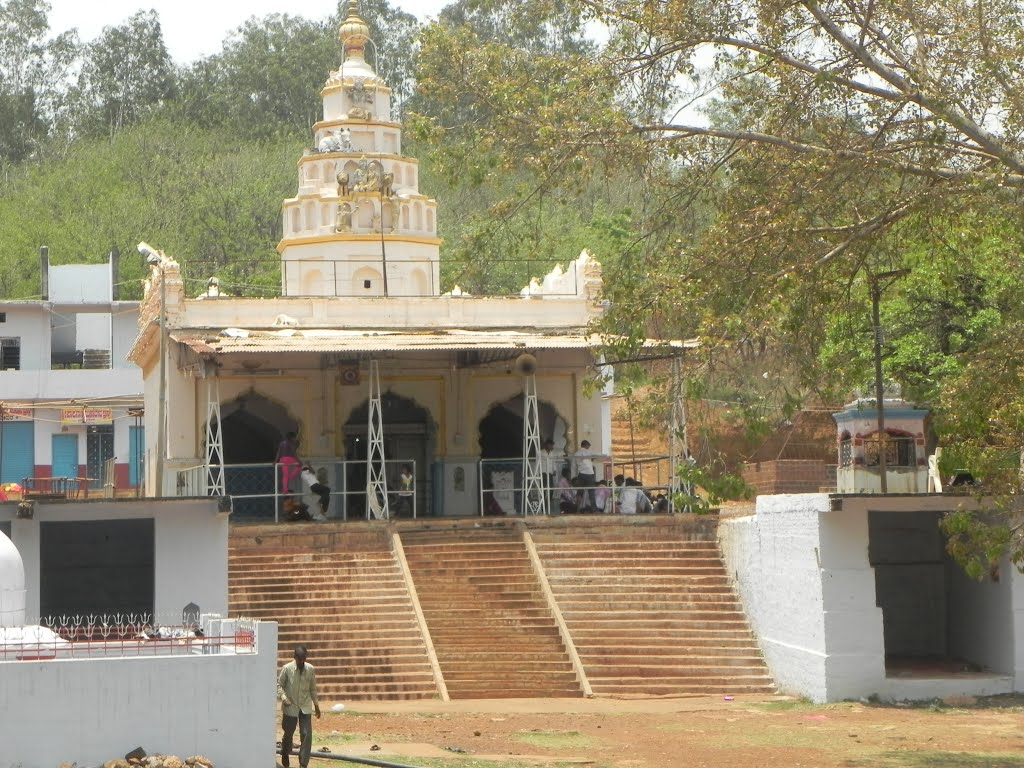
- Papnash Shiva Temple

- Location in Bidar district

Religion
- Affiliation: Hinduism
- District: Bidar
- Deity: Shiva
- Festival: Maha Shivratri
- Governing body: Government of Karnataka

Location
- State: Karnataka
- Country: India
- Coordinates: 17°55′43″N 77°29′30″E

Architecture
- Type: Chalukyan with later Bahmani influences
- Completed: 12th century

Website
- District Tourism Listing

Papnash Shiva Temple (also transliterated as Papnash; ಪಾಪನಾಶ ಶಿವ ದೇವಾಲಯ) is a 12th-century Hindu temple dedicated to Lord Shiva located in Bidar, Karnataka, India. The temple is recognized for its historical significance and blend of architectural styles.

== History ==
The temple's origins date to the Kalyana Chalukya period (12th century), as documented in the Karnataka District Gazetteer: Bidar. It underwent modifications during the Bahmani Sultanate era, evident in its blended architectural features.

== Architecture ==
The temple complex features:

- A trikuta (three-shrine) layout characteristic of Chalukyan design
- Later additions including local/regional-style arches and motifs
- An ancient stepped tank (kalyani) still in ritual use

== Festivals ==
The temple is renowned for its Maha Shivaratri celebrations:

- Over 25,000 devotees attended in 2023, performing synchronized prayers called the "Papnash Pose"
- Unique rituals were documented by ETV Bharat in 2020

== Conservation ==
Recent initiatives include:

- A 2022 cleanliness drive by district administration
- ₹12.42 crore funding under the PRASHAD scheme in 2023
- Additional ₹5 crore announced in 2024 for water facilities

== Environmental concerns ==
In 2023, reports emerged about pollution in the temple lake:

- Local residents reported wildlife deaths
- Karnataka Pollution Control Board initiated water testing
