= Guru Nanak Jhira Sahib =

Gurdwara in Karnataka, India

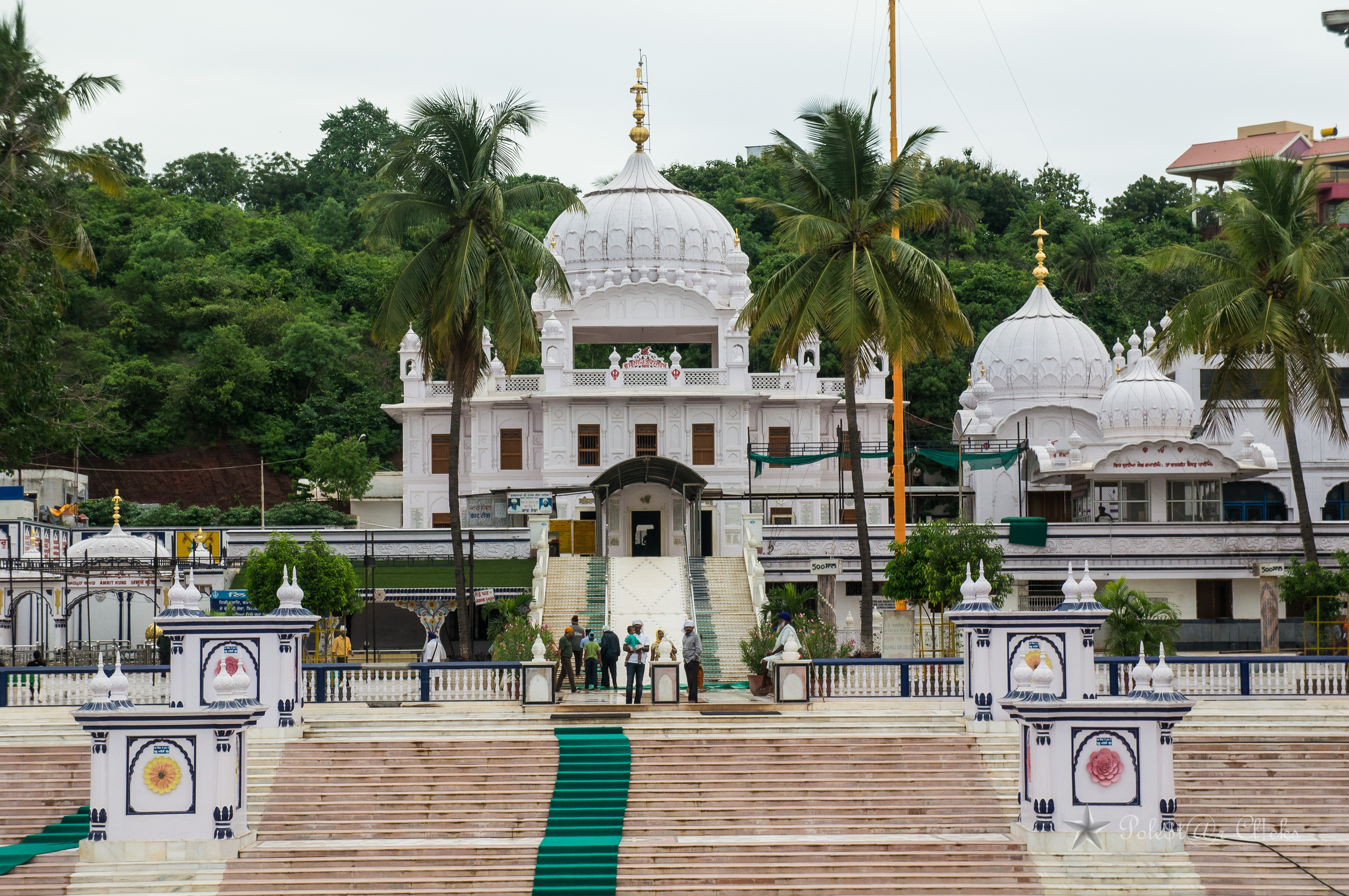

Religion
- Affiliation: Sikhism
- District: Bidar district
- Region: Kalyana-Karnataka
- Deity: Guru Nanak
- Festival: Guru Nanak Jayanti (Guru Nanak Gurpurab)
- Governing body: Government of Karnataka

Location
- Location: Shiva Nagar, Bidar
- Municipality: Bidar
- State: Karnataka
- Country: India
- Interactive map of Guru Nanak Jhira Sahib
- Coordinates: 17.9279°N 77.5079°E

Architecture
- Style: Sikh architecture
- Established: 1948 (78 years ago)

Specifications
- Length: 35.4 kilometres (22.0 miles)
- Width: 19.3 kilometres (12.0 miles)
- Dome: 1
- Shrine: 01
- Elevation: 618.7 m (2,030 ft)

Website
- www.gurunanakjhirabidar.com

Guru Nanak Jhira Sahib is a Sikh historical shrine situated in Bidar, Karnataka, India. Gurdwara Nanak Jhira Sahib was built in 1948 and is dedicated to the first Sikh guru, Guru Nanak. Bidar has a very long association with Sikhism as this is the home town of Bhai Sahib Singh, one of the Panj Pyare (five beloved ones), who offered to sacrifice their heads and were later baptised as the first members of the Khalsa.

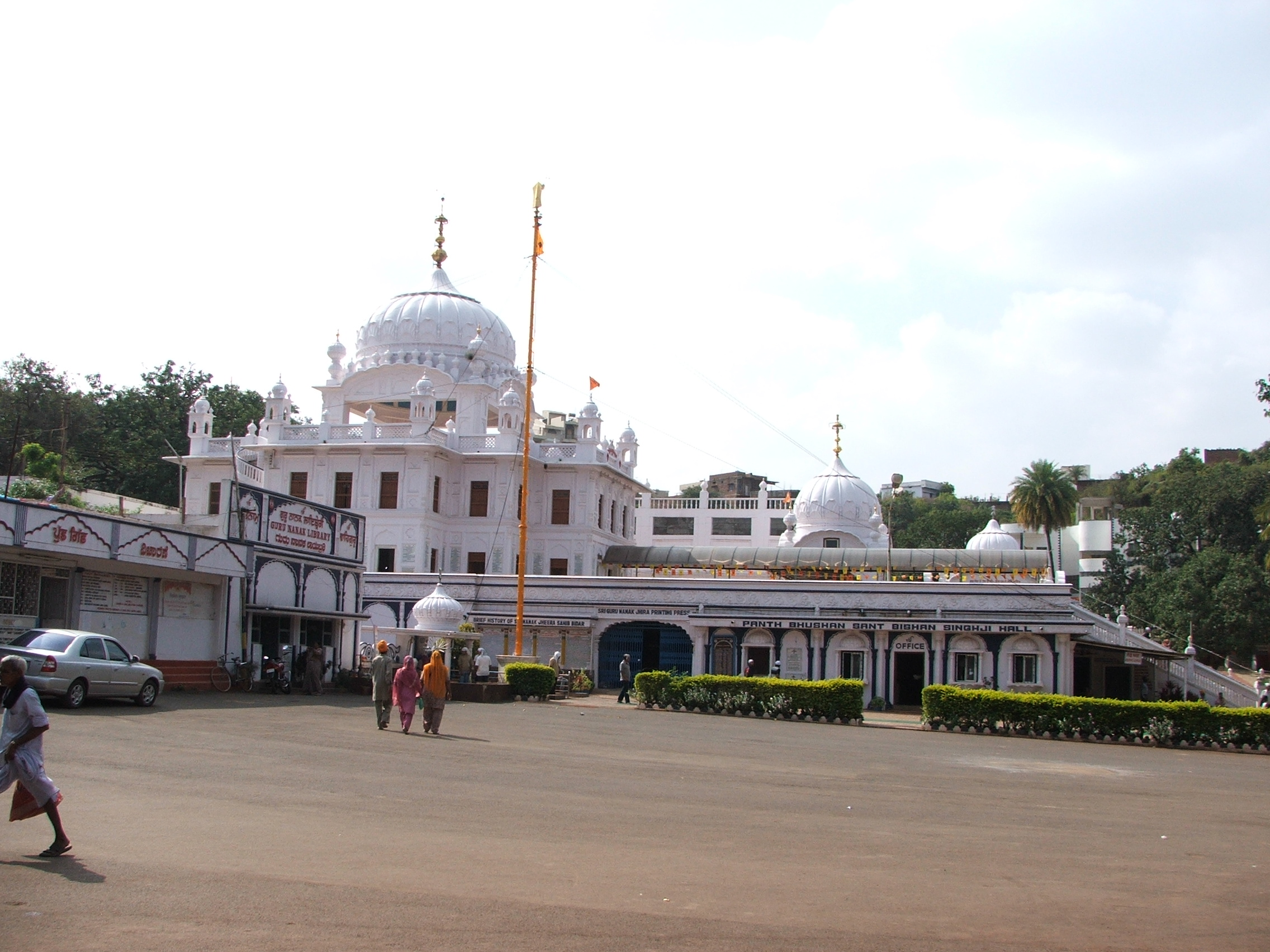
Gurudwara Nanak Jhira Sahib at Bidar, Karnataka

== Description ==
The Gurudwara is established in a nice valley, surrounded by laterite hills on three sides. The shrine comprises Darbar Sahib, Diwan Hall and Langar Hall. In the sukhaasan room, Guru Granth Sahib, the holy book of Sikh is placed. There is a separate room called the Likhari Room, where donations are accepted and receipts are issued.

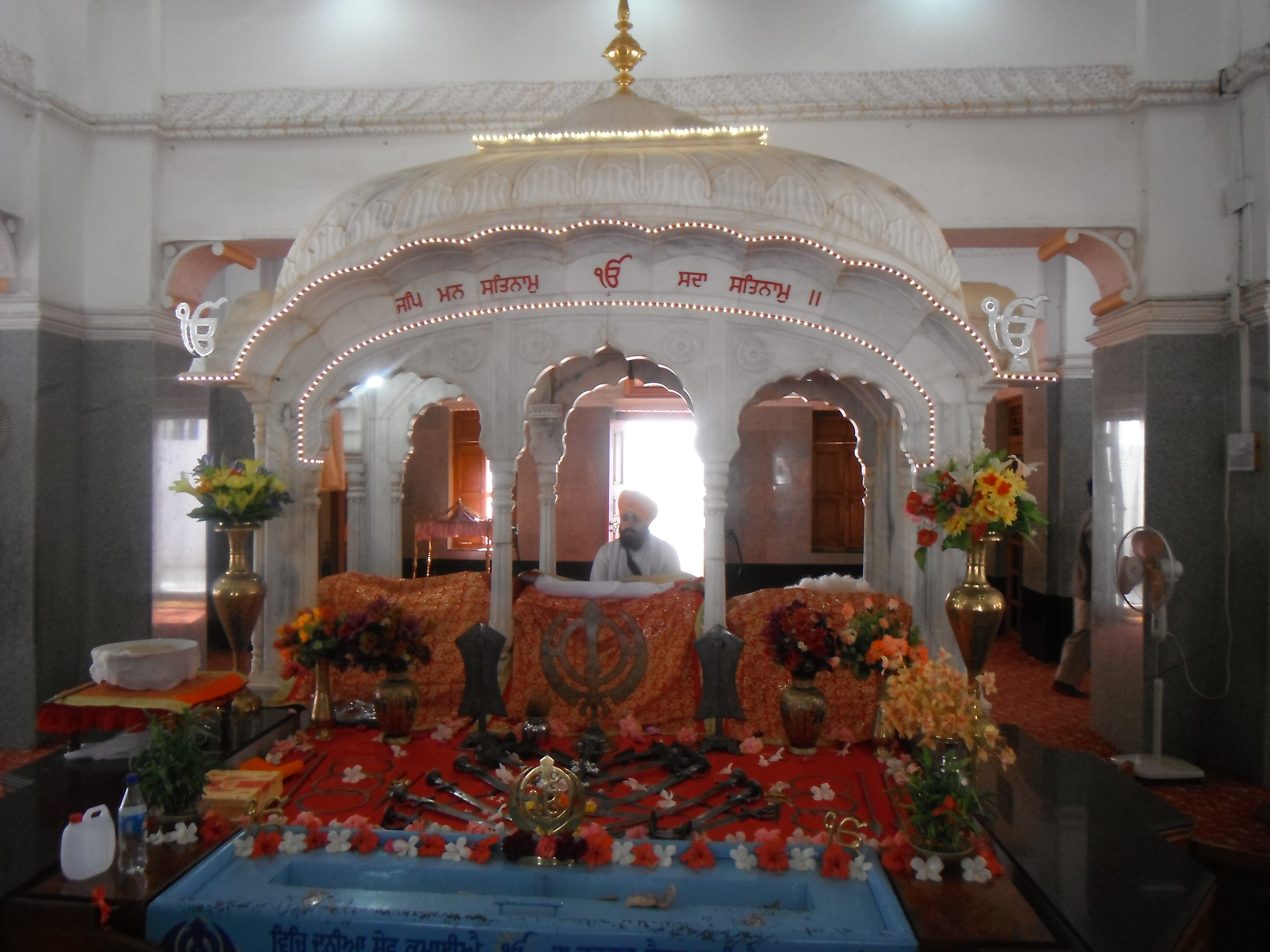
Inside Gurudwara Nanak Jhira Sahib

A beautiful Gurdwara has been constructed after the independence of India in 1948 by the side of the spring. The water from the spring is collected in a small Amrit Kund (a holy water tank) built opposite to the front stairs of the Gurudwara . It is believed that a holy dip is enough to cleanse the body as well as the soul. There is a free community kitchen (Guru Ka Langar) where free food is given to pilgrims 24 hours night and day. A Sikh museum has been built in the memory of Guru Tegh Bahadur, depicting the important events of Sikh history through pictures and paintings.

== History ==
During his second udasi (missionary tour) of south India between 1510 and 1514 A.D., Guru Nanak after sojourning through Nagpur and Khandwa visited the ancient Hindu temple of Omkareshwar on the Narmada and reached Nanded (where 200 years later Guru Gobind Singh spent his last days). From Nanded he proceeded towards Hyderabad and Golconda where he met Muslim saints and then arrived at Bidar to meet Pir Jalaluddin and Yakoob Ali.

According to the Janamsakhis, the Guru accompanied by his companion Mardana stayed in the outskirts of the Bidar. Nearby were the huts of Muslim fakirs, who took keen interest in the sermons and teachings of the great guru. The news soon spread throughout Bidar and its surrounding areas about the holy saint of the north and large number of people started coming to him to have his darshan and seek his blessings. There used to be acute shortage of drinking water in Bidar. All efforts of the people to dig wells were of no avail. Even when wells produced water the water was found to be unfit for drinking.

According to tradition, Guru Nanak cleared rubble from a site using his wooden sandal, revealing a freshwater spring. The location subsequently became known as Nanak Jhira, derived from the Punjabi word for stream (jhira). The spring issues from a rock formation near the Gurudwara and remains active.

Another version of Guru Nanak's visit to Bidar has him visiting a Sufi saint who lived with his family and followers here amidst a source of fresh, sweet water and that is where the Gurudwara eventually came to be.

== Geology ==
Though Bidar is at an elevation, the gurdwara is at a lower level. It is located amidst the slopes of the hilly terrain. The lateritic rock formation under the plateau enables percolation of surface water. Bidar urban plateau is of irregular shape, land stretching about 35.4 km in length and 19.3 km in width. The plateau consists of red laterite rocky crust, of a depth varying from 30.5 m to 152.4 m supported on impervious trap base. This has resulted in springs at the cleavages between trap and laterite rocks. Such water springs can be observed in Bidar also at Narasimha Jharni, Papanasha Shiva Temple etc.

== Significance ==
It may be recalled that Bhai Sahib Singh, one of The Panj Piaras (five beloved of Guru Gobind Singh), hailed from Bidar where he was once a barber. He was the son of Gurunarayana and Ankamma from Bidar.

The spring is flowing since more than 500 years and has never dried out. Devotees throng to the Nanak Jhira Bidar Gurudwara especially during Guru Nanak Jayanti. Volunteers make elaborate preparations to celebrate the Guru Nanak Jayanti, which is one of the major festivals of the Sikhs. Preparations include cleaning the gurudwara, guarding the shoes of visitors and helping out in the kitchen. The gurudwara is especially adorned with flags, banners and lights for this occasion.

In respect of Gurudwara Sri Nanak Jhira Sahib, It will not be out of place to mention that this Gurudwara is the second supernatural occurrence of Guru Nanak, whereas the first one was Sri Punja Sahib (now in Pakistan and strictly prohibited for free visits); hence, Gurudwara Nanak Jhira Sahib is the Second Punja Sahib of India.

Nearly four to five lakh pilgrims visit this gurudwara every year. Part of the town's business comes from these crowds, who gather at the spot built around water. It stands to reason therefore that special attention is paid to the spring and great care is taken of this water resource. The Gurudwara itself has organized the tunnel and the point where the spring emerges very well. A glass panel enables viewing, yet protects the spring from desecration.

Visitors and Pilgrims carry the "holy" water from the spring in bottles and water-cans.

== Concerns ==
The recharge zone of the spring, the surrounding hills are being built upon at an unprecedented rate. Septic tanks and soak pits are sending the waste-water generated into the ground. The surface is being crusted up with roads and buildings preventing the seepage of water into the ground.

It is likely that the sacred ‘Jhira’ will first be contaminated by the bad water and if steps are not taken quickly, may also run dry due to lack of recharge of waters in the hills.

== Nearby Pilgrim Centre ==
- Gurudwara of Mai Bhagoji at Janawada village of Bidar taluk, 10 km away from Bidar city. It is said that when Sri Guru Gobind Singh ji came to Nanded in Maharashtra from Punjab, Mai Bhagoji had accompanied Guruji. During her stay at Janwada at the residence of Rustam Rao and Bala Rao, land lords of the region, Mata Mai Bhagoji popularised the message of Sikhism. As a mark of respect, a gurudwara in her name of Mai Bhagoji had been built at Janwada village and was managed by Gurudwara Prabandhak Committee of Sri Nank Jhira Saheb, Bidar.
