= Anurag Tewari =

Indian civil servant

Deputy Commissioner of Bidar
- In office November 2015 – October 2016

Commissioner, Department of Food, Civil Supplies and Consumer Affairs, Bengaluru
- In office October 2016 – 17 May 2017

Personal details
- Born: 17 May 1981
- Died: 17 May 2017 (aged 36) Lucknow, Uttar Pradesh, India
- Education: Indian Institute of Technology (IIT)
- Profession: Civil servant

Anurag Tewari was an Indian administrative service officer of 2007 batch, Karnataka cadre. As Deputy Commissioner of Bidar from November 2015 to October 2016, he designed a ground water recharge scheme funded through the MGNREGA. The Government of Karnataka adopted this model statewide as the "Raita Belaku" (Light of the Farmer) program in 2017.

== Early life and education ==
Anurag Tewari was born in 1981. He holds an engineer degree from the Indian Institute of Technology (IIT), he cleared the UPSC civil service examination.

== Career ==
Tewari was commissioned in the Indian Administrative Service (IAS) in 2007.

=== Deputy Commissioner of Bidar ===
In November 2015, Tewari was appointed Deputy Commissioner of Bidar. During this period, he conducted regular public visits and held administrative meeting called "Development Days". He launched a social media initiative #askDC for public grievance redressal.

Tewari implemented a scheme to deepen farm ponds using funds from the MGNREGA for groundwater recharge. The Government of Karnataka subsequently adopted this program statewide as "Raitha Belaku" (Light of the Farmers) in 2017.

=== Commissioner posting ===
In October 2016, Tewari was posted as Commissioner of the Department of Food, Civil Supplies and Consumer Affairs in Bengaluru. He held this position until his death on 17 May 2017.

== Death and investigation ==
=== Discovery and initial response ===
Tewari was found dead on a roadside near the Meera Bai State Guest House in Hazratganj, Lucknow, Uttar Pradesh on 17 May 2017, his 36th birthday. Police described the circumstances as suspicious. A post-mortem examination determined the cause of death to be asphyxiation.

=== Murder case registration ===
On 22 May 2017, the Hazratganj police registered a First Information Report under Indian penal code section 302 (murder) against unknown persons, based on a complaint filed by Tewari's brother Mayank Tewari. Tewari's family alleged he had been under pressure from superiors and that he had expressed concerns about his safety two months before his death. The Uttar Pradesh government recommended a Central Bureau of Investigation (CBI) investigation following a meeting with Yogi Adityanath.

A Uttar Pradesh minister stated in the assembly that Tewari was preparing to expose financial irregularities in the Karnataka Food Department worth 2,000 crore. The Karnataka government denied this claim. A special investigation team visited Tewari's Bengaluru office and residence in June 2017 to collect evidence.

=== CBI investigation ===
The CBI took over the investigation in July 2017 and registered a murder case under Indian Penal Code Sections 302 and 201.

In February 2019, the CBI filed a closure report concluding that Tewari died in an accidental fall resulting in asphyxiation, ruling out both suicide and homicide. Tewari's family rejected this finding. The CBI filed a second closure report in January 2021.

In September 2022, a special CBI court in Lucknow rejected both closure reports on a protest petition filed by Mayank Tewari. The court ruled that the closure reports could not be accepted, as of October 2022, the case remained officially open.
