= Robert Miranda =

Robert Miranda may refer to:

- Robert Miranda (bishop) (born 1952), first bishop of the Roman Catholic Diocese of Gulbarga
- Robert Miranda (actor) (born 1952), American film and television actor
