= Manhalli =

Manhalli Manalli
- Suburb
- Location in Karnataka, India Manhalli (India)
- Coordinates: 17.91°N 77.53°E
- Country: India
- State: Karnataka
- District: Bidar
- Talukas: Bidar

Area
  - Total: 3 km^{2} (1.2 sq mi)
- Elevation: 579 m (1,900 ft)

Population (2012)
  - Total: 19,124
  - Density: 6,400/km^{2} (17,000/sq mi)

Languages
  - Official: Kannada
- Time zone: UTC+5:30 (IST)
- Pin Code: 585403
- Vehicle registration: KA38

Manhalli, or Manalli, is a small town in Bidar taluka of Bidar district in the Indian state of Karnataka. It is located 20 km from Bidar.

== Demographics ==
As of 2011 India census, Manhalli had a population of 19,124, with 10,089 males and 9,035 females the education literacy is 54%. Manhalli's main road is State Highway No. 122. It goes to Bangalore and connects to the NH-65 also.

== Features ==
Manhalli has a pond that is three square kilometers large. It is located off State Highway No. 258.

Manhalli has many temples in and around it. These include:

Masjeed and Temples

- Shree Basaveshwar Temple
- Shree Bakkaprabhu Temple
- Shree Veerabhadreshwar Temple
- Shree Bhavani Mata Temple
- Shree Siddeshwar Temple
- Shree Hanuman Temple
- shree Panduranga Temple
- Shree Lingshwar temple
- Shree Bheerewhwar temple
- Jamia Masjid
- Khadeem Masjid
- masjid e ammar
- Tahera masjid

== Education ==
Educational facilities in Manhalli include:

- Running summer camp & Navodaya/Sainik/Rastriya military training for Kannada and English medium students from 5th standard to any degree
- A.P.J abdul kalam Navodaya Training centre, Manhalli
- Samskruti Computer Institute working with APJ Abdul kalam Computer Sakcharat Mission New Delhi and also working on PMGDISHA
- Sirajul Uloom Arabic School
- Sirajul Uloom Urdu High School
- Syed Jamaaluddin Primary School
- Syed Jamaaluddin PUC Collage
- Basva School Manhalli
- Government Primary and High school Manhalli.
- Government DED college manhalli
- BBA college manhalli
- Government BA college manhalli
- Government PUC college of science and arts
- Government first grade college manahlli

== Economy ==
Exports of Manhalli include:

- Sugar cane
- Rice
- Vegetables
- Grains
- Nuts

== See also ==
- Bidar
- Districts of Karnataka
