= Medpalli =

Village in Karnataka, India

- Village
- Interactive map of Medpalli
- Location within Karnataka
- Coordinates: 18°10′31″N 77°31′49″E
- Country: India
- State: Karnataka
- District: Bidar district
- Taluka (Tehsil): Aurad Taluka

Government
  - Type: Local Government
  - Body: Panchayati Raj
  - Panchayat: Gudpalli
  - Mukhiya/President: Lalita

Area
  - Total: 11.14 km^{2} (4.30 sq mi)

Population (2011)
  - Total: 1,112
  - Density: 99.8/km^{2} (258/sq mi)
- Demonym: Medpallikar

Languages
  - Official: Kannada
  - Regional: Hindi & Marathi

Demographics
  - Literacy: 58.05%
  - Sex ratio: 937
- Time zone: UTC+5:30 (IST)
- PIN: 585421
- ISO 3166 code: IN-KA
- Vehicle registration: KA 38
- Vidhan Sabha constituency: Aurad Assembly constituency
- Lok Sabha constituency: Bidar Lok Sabha constituency
- Website: bidar.nic.in

Medpalli (also spelled as Medapalli) is a village in Aurad Taluka of Bidar district in the Indian state Karnataka. It is located approximately 21 kilometres (13 mi) from taluka headquarters Aurad and about 32 kilometres (20 mi) from district headquarters Bidar. The village falls under the Aurad Assembly constituency and Bidar Lok Sabha constituency.

== Geography ==
Medpalli is situated at an average elevation of 534 metres (1,752 ft). The village lies in the northern dry zone of Karnataka, characterized by black cotton soil.

== Demographics ==
Medpalli has a population of 1112 (574 males and 538) as recorded in the 2011 Census. It falls under the jurisdiction of Gudapalli Gram Panchayat and the Aurad Block Panchayat in Aurad District. The village has 207 households and is identified by village code 600090. Medpalli is located in the 585421 postal area, contributing significantly to the rural administrative structure of Aurad taluka

- Literacy rate: 58.05%
- Primary languages: Kannada (72%), Marathi (18%)

== Administration ==
- Gram Panchayat: Gudpalli
- Nearest Police station: Chintaki

== Economy ==
The village economy is primarily agricultural, with major crops including jowar, maize, and pulses.

== School ==
Government HRPS Medpalli (Medapalli)

== Post Office ==
Medpalli Branch Post Office

== Transportation ==
- Nearest Bus Station: Aurad
- Nearest Railway Station: Bidar
- Nearest Airport: Bidar
