= B. Narayan Rao =

Indian politician (1955–2020)

Member of the Karnataka Legislative Assembly
- In office 2018 – 24 September 2020
- Preceded by: Mallikarjun Khuba
- Succeeded by: Sharanu Salagar
- Constituency: Basavakalyan

Personal details
- Born: 1 July 1955 Basanthapur
- Died: 24 September 2020 (aged 65) Manipal, India
- Cause of death: COVID-19
- Party: Indian National Congress (until his death)
- Spouse: Mala
- Children: Gautam B Narayan Rao and Rahul B Narayan Rao

Basanthpur Narayan Rao (1 July 1955 – 24 September 2020) was an Indian politician who was a member of the Karnataka Legislative Assembly from Basavakalyan Assembly constituency for the Indian National Congress from 2018 until his death. He had competed in the elections to become an MLA twice before winning a seat.

Rao was born on 1 July 1955, in the village of Basanthpur, Bidar district. He was admitted to a private hospital in Manipal on 1 September 2020, for COVID-19 during the COVID-19 pandemic in India. Rao died from the disease on 24 September, aged 65.

== Controversies ==
During 2019 Lok sabha election campaign, Narayana Rao called PM Modi an impotent as he had no children even though he was married. He was criticized for using the stage to make controversial statements.
