= Kamthana =

Kamthana Kambithana
- village
- Location in Karnataka, India Kamthana (India)
- Coordinates: 17.91°N 77.53°E
- Country: India
- State: Karnataka
- District: Bidar
- Talukas: Bidar

Population (2011)
  - Total: 11,179

Languages
  - Official: Kannada
- Time zone: UTC+5:30 (IST)

Kamthana is a village in Bidar taluka of Bidar district, in the Indian state of Karnataka. Kamthana's ancient village, Jain Tirtha (pilgrimage), is about 10 km from Bidar, famous for the historical Parshavanth Tirthankara Jain temple. The annual three-day car festival is usually held in February.

== History ==
During 753 A.D Rashtrakuta prince Dantidurga proclaimed himself the sovereign power and Manyakheta (Malkhed) as Capital, built Jain temple. Nishidhis, inscriptions indicates the act of sallekhana are found in and around Kamthana. Kamthana means a place of forgiveness.

== Parshavanatha Teerthankara Jain temple ==
Kamthana Jainism centre, by Jain munis and shravaks choose this place to seek salvation through sallekhana. Srivatsa (North Indian tradition), is a diamond-shaped mark on the chest of the Parshvanath. Parshvanath Tirthankara idol is about 115-cm tall and 55-cm wide, in the paryankasana style, sheltered under a seven-hooded serpent, it was installed about 900 years back. A small lamp burns day and night in the cave. The light of the lamp is reflected in 1,000 mirrors plastered on to the wall.

=== Discovery of Idol ===
The temple was part of a famous gurukul. For centuries, it provided students with religious and secular education free of cost. The gurukul and the temple was taken great care for over a century under the rule of the Nizams of Hyderabad. A Jain muni, Sri Shruta Sagar, rediscovered it in 1987. He began work on renovating the temple and organised an annual rath yatra, says Vijay Kumar Jain, Secretary of the Bidar Jain Milan. The temple trust is planning to revive the gurukul. The building plans are ready and donors have come forward to adopt students, he said.

"The temple was just a cave when the muni found it. It had a 1,100-year-old, life-size black stone statue of Sri Parshwanath, the 23rd Thirthankara. The muni told us that students and teachers of the gurukul used the cave to meditate. We shifted the statue to the first floor. We renovated the cave and built a Shikhara. That is why the temple has three floors," explains Shantinath, the head priest.

== Demographics ==
As of 2001 India census, Kamthana had a population of 9634 with 4956 males and 4678 females.

== See also ==
- Bidar
- Districts of Karnataka
- Lakkundi
