= Chondimukhed =

- village
- Interactive map of Chondimukhed
- Location in Karnataka, India Chondimukhed (India)
- Coordinates: 18.4677°N 77.2849°E
- Country: India
- State: Karnataka
- District: Bidar

Government
  - Type: Gram
  - Body: Panchayat

Area
  - Total: 4.60 km^{2} (1.78 sq mi)

Population (2020)
  - Total: 1,792
  - Density: 151/km^{2} (390/sq mi)
- Demonym: Chondimukhedkar

Languages
  - Official: Kannada
- Time zone: UTC+5:30 (IST)

Chondimukhed is a village enclave belonging to the Aurad Taluk of Bidar district in the state of Karnataka, India. Though belonging to the state of Karnataka, Chondimukhed village is surrounded by Maharashtra on all the sides.

Having a population of 2000, Chondimukhed is facing all the problems that an exclave has. The people here face an uncertain future with a feeling of neglect from both the states. However, the Karnataka Chief Minister H. D. Kumaraswamy has decided to visit Thondimukhed and stay for a day at the primary school here. It is to be seen whether his visit would cause some improvements to this village
