= Sharanu Salagar =

Indian politician

Member of Karnataka Legislative Assembly
- Incumbent
- Assumed office 2 May 2021
- Preceded by: B. Narayanrao
- Constituency: Basavakalyan

Personal details
- Born: 1 June 1975 (age 51) Basavakalyan, Karnataka, India
- Party: Bharatiya Janata Party
- Spouse: Savitri Salagar
- Education: M.Sc, M.Ed.
- Alma mater: Gulbarga University
- Profession: Businessman & Social Worker

Sharanu Salagar is an Indian politician from Bharatiya Janata Party. In May 2021, he was elected to the Karnataka Legislative Assembly from Basavakalyan (constituency). He defeated Mala B. Narayanrao of Indian National Congress by 20,629 votes in the 2021 by-elections.
