= Chitgoppa =

Chittaguppa
- Town
- Location in Karnataka, India
- Coordinates: 17.69°N 77.45°E
- Country: India
- State: Karnataka
- District: Bidar
- Date established: 2017

Government
  - Type: Town Municipal Council
  - Body: Chittaguppa Town Municipal Council

Area
  - Total: 6 km^{2} (2.3 sq mi)
- Elevation: 607 m (1,991 ft)

Population (2019)
  - Total: 46,943
  - Rank: 1
  - Density: 7,800/km^{2} (20,000/sq mi)
- Demonym: Chittaguppinavaru

Languages
  - Official: Kannada
- Time zone: UTC+5:30 (IST)
- PIN: 585 412
- Telephone code: 08483
- Vehicle registration: KA 78
- Website: www.chittaguppatown.mrc.gov.in

Chitagoppa is a taluka and town in Bidar district of Karnataka. Up until 2017, the city was under the administration of Humnabad. Chitguppa is divided into 23 wards. It is 15 kilometres (9.3 mi) from Humnabad and 53 kilometres (33 mi) from Bidar. The city is known for having the largest marketplace in the Bidar district and its corn production. It borders Kalaburagi district. The nearest highway is National Highway 65 which passes through Chitgoppa taluk.

== History ==
The Chitgoppa area, was formerly under the control of the Nizams, who established Sadar Diwani Adalat and Moffusil as their courts. Patwardhan Saheb was the first president of the Chitguppa municipality, and Kishan Rao Saheb was the president of the municipality for three consecutive terms until he voluntarily stepped down.

Every year in August a fair is held for the Hindu god Baloba. A marble statue of a Hindu saint Mahadevappe Devarshi has been installed in a monastery named after him in the town. A temple in Chitguppa is Bhavani Mandir which was established by the members of Bhavasar Kshatriya Samaj. After every Navratri there was a celebration of temple palki at the time of Vijayadashami. The speciality of this temple is in Navaratri Dasara.

== Geography ==
Chitguppa is divided into 23 wards. It is 15 kilometres (9.3 mi) from Humnabad. Area of 6 km^{2}.

== Demographics ==
Religious population in Chitguppa
Religion	Percent
Hindu	45.93%
Muslim	46.48%
Christian	6.82%
Others	0.77%

According to the 2011 Census of India, Chitgoppa had a population of 25,298: males constituted 51% of the population and females 49%. 13.33% of the population was under six years of age. Chitguppa had an average literacy rate of 71.88%, lower than the state average of 75.36%, with male literacy at 77.76% and female literacy at 65.75%. The Chitgoppa Town Municipal Council oversaw over 4,445 houses, to which it supplied basic amenities.
