= Diocese of Gulbarga =

Roman Catholic diocese in Karnataka, India

Coordinates: 17.3274°N 76.8283°E

Diocese of Gulbarga Dioecesis Gulbargiensis

Location
- Country: India
- Ecclesiastical province: Bangalore
- Metropolitan: Bangalore

Statistics
- Area: 38,752 km^{2} (14,962 sq mi)
- Population: Total; Catholics: (as of 2006); 6,435,095; 5,000 (0.1%)

Information
- Denomination: Catholic
- Sui iuris church: Latin Church
- Rite: Roman Rite
- Established: 24 June 2005
- Cathedral: Cathedral of Mother Mary of Divine Grace in Gulbarga

Current leadership
- Pope: Leo XIV
- Bishop: Robert Miranda
- Metropolitan Archbishop: Peter Machado

Map
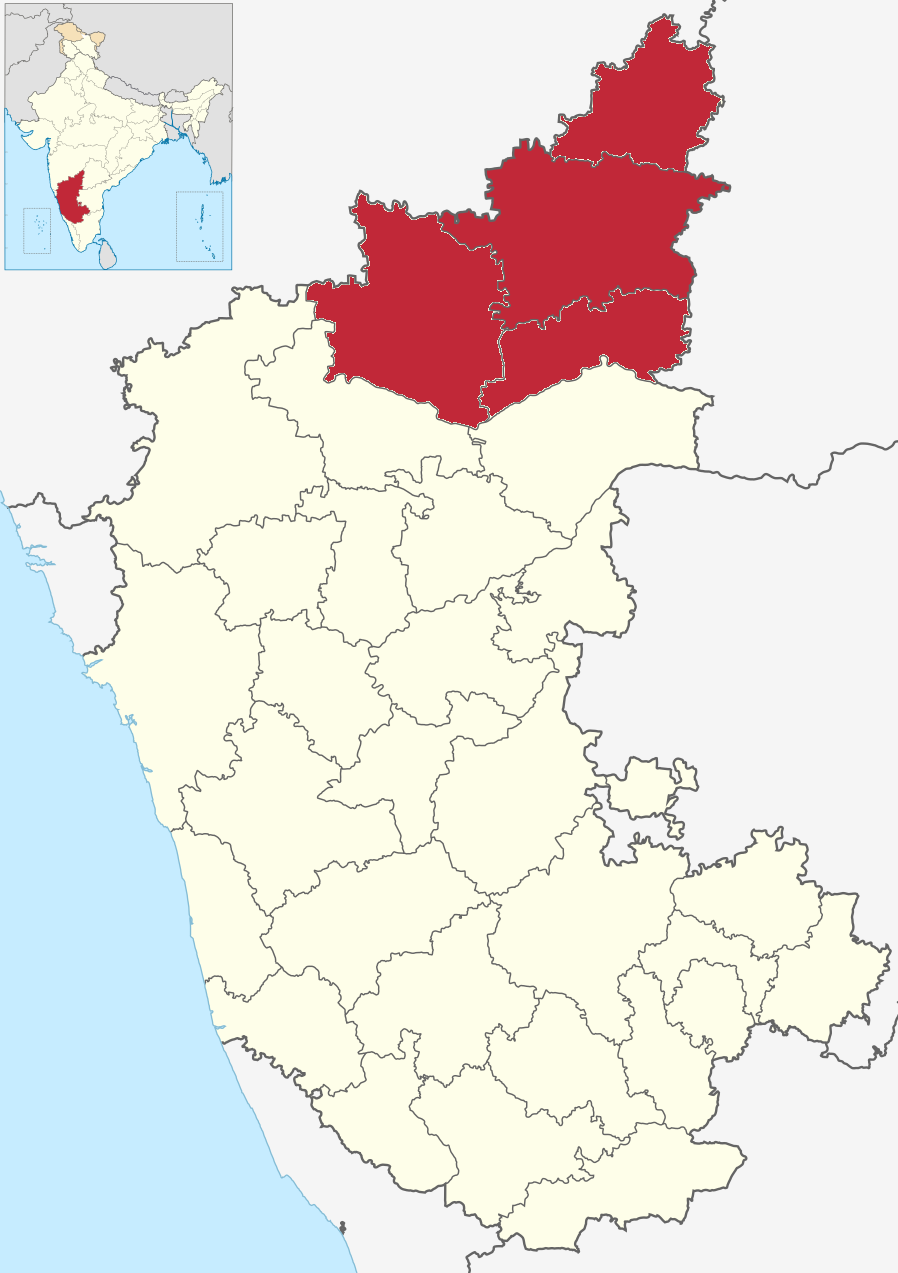

Website
- gulbargadiocese.org

The Roman Catholic Diocese of Gulbarga in India was created on 24 June 2005. It is a suffragan diocese of the Archdiocese of Bangalore. Its first bishop is Rev. Robert Miranda. The parish church Mother Mary of Divine Grace in Gulbarga will be the cathedral for the diocese. It was the 150th diocese of India, and the 120th of Latin Rite.

The diocese covers an area of 38,752 km² of the Karnataka state previously belonging to the Archdiocese of Hyderabad and the dioceses of Bellary and Belgaum.

The total population in the diocese is 7,012,492, of which 6,425 are Catholic. The diocese is subdivided into 16 parishes.
