= Mallikarjun Khuba =

Indian politician

Member of the Karnataka Legislative Assembly
- In office 2004–2008
- Preceded by: M. G. Muley
- Succeeded by: Basavaraj Patil Attur
- In office 2013–2018
- Preceded by: Basavaraj Patil Attur
- Succeeded by: B. Narayan Rao
- Constituency: Basavakalyan

Personal details
- Party: Janata Dal (Secular) (May 2025–present)
- Other political affiliations: Bharatiya Janata Party (until May 2025)

Mallikarjun Khuba is an Indian politician and he served as Member of the Karnataka Legislative Assembly from Basavakalyan Assembly constituency. He contest in 2021 bypolls Basavakalyan Assembly constituency as Independent candidate.
