= Hulsoor =

- Small Town
- Location within Karnataka Location within India
- Country: India
- State: Karnataka
- District: Bidar district

Population (2011)
  - Total: 11,593

Hulsoor is a town and new taluka in Bidar district in the southern state of Karnataka. In 2017, the village was declared a taluka. It is located 15 km from Basavakalyan.

== Places of worship ==
- Shri veerabhadreswar Temple
- Isampalli Devi
- Goddess Tulaja Bhavani Temple
- Shri Guru Basaveshwar Sanstan Math.
- Shri Santa Raghunath Maharaj math.
- Shri Tori Basavanna Temple
- Sai Baba Temple
- Nullichannayya Temple
- Mahadev Temple
- Maruti Temple
- Hanuman Temple
- Laxmi Temple
- Nageshwar Mandir
- Deghul mahadev mandir
- Jama masjid bada bazar
- Jama masjid momin mahela
- Quresh masjid.

== Demographics ==
As of 2011 India census, Hulsoor had a population of 11593 with 5868 males, and 5725 females.

== See also ==
- Bidar
- Districts of Karnataka
