= Basavakalyan Assembly constituency =

Constituency of the Karnataka Legislative Assembly

Coordinates: 17.87°N 76.95°E

Basavakalyan
- Constituency No. 47 for the Karnataka Legislative Assembly

Constituency details
- Country: India
- Region: South India
- State: Karnataka
- District: Bidar
- Lok Sabha constituency: Bidar
- Established: 1957
- Total electors: 246,581
- Reservation: None

Member of Legislative Assembly
- 16th Karnataka Legislative Assembly
- Incumbent Sharanu Salagar
- Party: Bharatiya Janata Party
- Elected year: 2023
- Preceded by: B. Narayan Rao

Basavakalyan Assembly constituency is one of the 224 assembly constituencies of Karnataka, a southern state of India. This constituency falls under Bidar Lok Sabha constituency.

== Members of the Legislative Assembly ==
Election	Member	Party
1957	Annapurna Bai	Indian National Congress
1962	Annapurna Bai	Indian National Congress
1967	S. Sanganbasappa	Independent politician
1972	Bapurao Anand Rao	Indian National Congress
1978	Bapurao Hulsoorkar	Indian National Congress
1983	Basawaraj Shankarappa Patil	Janata Party
1985	Basavaraj Patil Attur	Janata Party
1989	Basavaraj Patil Attur	Janata Dal
1994	Basavaraj Patil Attur	Janata Dal
1999	M. G. Muley	Janata Dal
2004	Mallikarjun Khuba	Janata Dal
2008	Basavaraj Patil Attur	Bharatiya Janata Party
2013	Mallikarjun Khuba	Janata Dal
2018	B. Narayan Rao	Indian National Congress
2021^ (Note: Died on 24 September 2020)	Sharanu Salagar	Bharatiya Janata Party
2023	Sharanu Salagar	Bharatiya Janata Party

^ indicates By-election

== Election results ==
=== Assembly Election 2023 ===
2023 Karnataka Legislative Assembly election : Basavakalyan
Party	Candidate	Votes	%	±%
BJP	Sharanu Salagar	92,920	52.80	▲4.34
INC	Vijay Singh	78,505	44.61	▲10.23
JD(S)	Sanjukumar Wadekar	1,526	0.87	▼6.91
NOTA	None of the above	502	0.29	▼0.32
Margin of victory		14,415	8.19	▼5.89
Turnout		176,099	71.42	▲9.86
Total valid votes		175,991		
Registered electors		246,581		▲2.75
BJP hold		Swing	▲4.34	

=== Assembly By-election 2021 ===
2021 Karnataka Legislative Assembly by-election : Basavakalyan
Party	Candidate	Votes	%	±%
BJP	Sharanu Salagar	71,012	48.46	▲18.08
INC	Mala B. Narayanrao	50,383	34.38	▼7.89
JD(S)	Sayed Yasrub Ali Quadri	11,402	7.78	▼13.84
Independent	Mallikarjun Khuba	9,457	6.45	New
AIMIM	Abdul Razzak Baba Chowdhary	2,174	1.48	New
NOTA	None of the above	889	0.61	▼0.36
Margin of victory		20,629	14.08	▲2.19
Turnout		147,739	61.56	▼3.29
Total valid votes		146,543		
Registered electors		239,981		▲6.98
BJP gain from INC		Swing	▲6.19	

=== Assembly Election 2018 ===
2018 Karnataka Legislative Assembly election : Basavakalyan
Party	Candidate	Votes	%	±%
INC	B. Narayan Rao	61,425	42.27	▲26.39
BJP	Mallikarjun Khuba	44,153	30.38	▲17.56
JD(S)	P. G. R. Sindhia	31,414	21.62	▼5.95
AAP	Deepak Malgar	1,747	1.20	New
NOTA	None of the above	1,410	0.97	New
Margin of victory		17,272	11.89	▲0.21
Turnout		145,476	64.85	▲1.07
Total valid votes		145,326		
Registered electors		224,318		▲13.29
INC gain from JD(S)		Swing	▲14.70	

=== Assembly Election 2013 ===
2013 Karnataka Legislative Assembly election : Basavakalyan
Party	Candidate	Votes	%	±%
JD(S)	Mallikarjun Khuba	37,494	27.57	▲5.21
INC	B. Narayan Rao	21,601	15.88	▼13.19
BSRCP	M. G. Muley	18,214	13.39	New
KJP	Attur Mallamma Patil	17,965	13.21	New
BJP	Sanjay D. Patwari	17,431	12.82	▼23.67
WPOI	Sardar Khan	2,742	2.02	New
Independent	Jaganath Patil	2,595	1.91	New
Independent	Mallamma Biradar	1,701	1.25	New
BSP	Abdul Razaq	1,489	1.09	▼4.92
Margin of victory		15,893	11.68	▲4.26
Turnout		126,296	63.78	▲7.47
Total valid votes		136,013		
Registered electors		198,011		▲4.14
JD(S) gain from BJP		Swing	▼8.92	

=== Assembly Election 2008 ===
2008 Karnataka Legislative Assembly election : Basavakalyan
Party	Candidate	Votes	%	±%
BJP	Basavaraj Patil Attur	39,015	36.49	▲19.92
INC	M. G. Muley	31,077	29.07	▲10.83
JD(S)	Mallikarjun Khuba	23,905	22.36	▼4.79
BSP	Shanthappa G. Patil	6,427	6.01	▼4.89
Independent	Bhagirathi Shivaraj	2,195	2.05	New
Swarna Yuga Party	Yuvaraj Baliram Patil	1,893	1.77	New
Independent	Arun Kumar Shivaji Rao	1,082	1.01	New
RPI(A)	Milind Guruji	708	0.66	New
Margin of victory		7,938	7.42	▲0.60
Turnout		107,071	56.31	▼4.73
Total valid votes		106,913		
Registered electors		190,131		▲6.62
BJP gain from JD(S)		Swing	▲9.34	

=== Assembly Election 2004 ===
2004 Karnataka Legislative Assembly election : Basavakalyan
Party	Candidate	Votes	%	±%
JD(S)	Mallikarjun Khuba	29,557	27.15	▼23.46
Independent	Basavaraj Patil Attur	22,132	20.33	New
INC	M. G. Muley	19,857	18.24	▲14.48
BJP	Shanthappa G. Patil	18,034	16.57	New
BSP	Nisar Ahmed Md. Hussain	11,862	10.90	▲9.28
JP	Basavaraj Siddanna Varkale	2,350	2.16	New
Independent	Sardar Khan	1,355	1.24	New
Kannada Nadu Party	Shivappa Dhulappa Holkunde	1,214	1.12	New
Independent	Gundappa Sharanappa	1,033	0.95	New
Margin of victory		7,425	6.82	▼13.32
Turnout		108,856	61.04	▼4.72
Total valid votes		108,854		
Registered electors		178,323		▲14.90
JD(S) hold		Swing	▼23.46	

=== Assembly Election 1999 ===
1999 Karnataka Legislative Assembly election : Basavakalyan
Party	Candidate	Votes	%	±%
JD(S)	M. G. Muley	48,166	50.61	New
JD(U)	Basavaraj Patil Attur	29,002	30.48	New
NCP	Shanthappa G. Patil	5,381	5.65	New
Independent	Gundappa Sherikar Janawada	4,880	5.13	New
INC	Meer Jahangir Ali	3,574	3.76	▼28.92
Independent	Sharadkumar Ganure	1,924	2.02	New
BSP	Dr. Amaranath Jamadar	1,541	1.62	▼8.78
Independent	Sardar Khan	694	0.73	New
Margin of victory		19,164	20.14	▲12.72
Turnout		102,062	65.76	▲3.50
Total valid votes		95,162		
Rejected ballots		6,888	6.75	▲4.29
Registered electors		155,196		▲8.83
JD(S) gain from JD		Swing	▲10.51	

=== Assembly Election 1994 ===
1994 Karnataka Legislative Assembly election : Basavakalyan
Party	Candidate	Votes	%	±%
JD	Basavaraj Patil Attur	34,728	40.10	▼1.05
INC	Muley Maruthirao Govindrao	28,299	32.68	▼5.04
BJP	Mahajan. M. G	12,586	14.53	New
BSP	Vaijanath Tulsiram	9,006	10.40	New
INC	Goverdhan Palam	1,030	1.19	New
Independent	Shivraj Timmanna Bokke	603	0.70	New
Margin of victory		6,429	7.42	▲3.99
Turnout		88,790	62.26	▼0.83
Total valid votes		86,603		
Rejected ballots		2,187	2.46	▼3.36
Registered electors		142,606		▲7.61
JD hold		Swing	▼1.05	

=== Assembly Election 1989 ===
1989 Karnataka Legislative Assembly election : Basavakalyan
Party	Candidate	Votes	%	±%
JD	Basavaraj Patil Attur	32,404	41.15	New
INC	Marutirao Muley	29,705	37.72	▼4.80
JP	B. Narayanrao	14,104	17.91	New
Independent	Manohar Ghatke	1,315	1.67	New
Independent	Jiyanand Rao	549	0.70	New
Margin of victory		2,699	3.43	▼6.62
Turnout		83,612	63.09	▼1.65
Total valid votes		78,745		
Rejected ballots		4,867	5.82	▲3.55
Registered electors		132,521		▲27.54
JD gain from JP		Swing	▼11.41	

=== Assembly Election 1985 ===
1985 Karnataka Legislative Assembly election : Basavakalyan
Party	Candidate	Votes	%	±%
JP	Basavaraj Patil Attur	34,556	52.56	▲8.16
INC	Marutirao Muley	27,951	42.52	▲21.28
Independent	Baburao Gudage	807	1.23	New
Independent	Chandrakanth Mhetre	683	1.04	New
Independent	Nawab. S. M. Kamaloddin	678	1.03	New
Independent	Bapurao Hulsoorkar	514	0.78	New
Margin of victory		6,605	10.05	▼11.51
Turnout		67,269	64.74	▼4.40
Total valid votes		65,740		
Rejected ballots		1,529	2.27	▼0.04
Registered electors		103,909		▲13.34
JP hold		Swing	▲8.16	

=== Assembly Election 1983 ===
1983 Karnataka Legislative Assembly election : Basavakalyan
Party	Candidate	Votes	%	±%
JP	Basawaraj Shankarappa Patil	27,494	44.40	▲8.01
Independent	Nawab. S. M. Kamaloddin	14,144	22.84	New
INC	Bapurao Hulsoorkar	13,150	21.24	▲12.31
Independent	Krishnappa Chandrappa	3,780	6.10	New
Independent	Sidramappa Sanganbasappa Khuba	2,068	3.34	New
Independent	Bamma Reddy Mannure	1,288	2.08	New
Margin of victory		13,350	21.56	▲11.99
Turnout		63,386	69.14	▲7.49
Total valid votes		61,924		
Rejected ballots		1,462	2.31	▼1.05
Registered electors		91,683		▲5.36
JP gain from INC(I)		Swing	▼1.56	

=== Assembly Election 1978 ===
1978 Karnataka Legislative Assembly election : Basavakalyan
Party	Candidate	Votes	%	±%
INC(I)	Bapurao Hulsoorkar	23,827	45.96	New
JP	Tajuddin Nawazbhai	18,868	36.39	New
INC	Siddappa Khelgi	4,629	8.93	▼46.17
Independent	Bammareddy Hanmanth Reddy	3,497	6.75	New
Independent	Naganna Halshetty	606	1.17	New
Independent	Manikappa Siddalingappa	418	0.81	New
Margin of victory		4,959	9.57	▼0.63
Turnout		53,649	61.65	▲1.06
Total valid votes		51,845		
Rejected ballots		1,804	3.36	▲3.36
Registered electors		87,022		▲13.36
INC(I) gain from INC		Swing	▼9.14	

=== Assembly Election 1972 ===
1972 Mysore State Legislative Assembly election : Basavakalyan
Party	Candidate	Votes	%	±%
INC	Bapurao Anand Rao	24,995	55.10	▲33.27
Independent	Sidramappa Sanganbasappa	20,367	44.90	New
Margin of victory		4,628	10.20	▼6.08
Turnout		46,516	60.59	▼4.73
Total valid votes		45,362		
Registered electors		76,767		▲29.23
INC gain from Independent		Swing	▲10.49	

=== Assembly Election 1967 ===
1967 Mysore State Legislative Assembly election : Basavakalyan
Party	Candidate	Votes	%	±%
Independent	S. Sanganbasappa	16,115	44.61	New
Independent	Bapurao Anand Rao	10,233	28.33	New
INC	A. Vaijnath	7,887	21.83	▼30.28
PSP	B. Chitambar	1,892	5.24	▼16.40
Margin of victory		5,882	16.28	▼9.59
Turnout		38,802	65.32	▲17.06
Total valid votes		36,127		
Registered electors		59,403		▲8.97
Independent gain from INC		Swing	▼7.50	

=== Assembly Election 1962 ===
1962 Mysore State Legislative Assembly election : Kalyani
Party	Candidate	Votes	%	±%
INC	Annapurna Bai	12,868	52.11	▼6.62
Independent	Krishnaji Shastry	6,481	26.25	New
PSP	Bhimrao Patwardhan	5,343	21.64	▲5.68
Margin of victory		6,387	25.87	▼7.55
Turnout		26,310	48.26	▼22.68
Total valid votes		24,692		
Registered electors		54,512		▲72.93
INC hold		Swing	▼6.62	

=== Assembly Election 1957 ===
1957 Mysore State Legislative Assembly election : Kalyani
Party	Candidate	Votes	%	±%
INC	Annapurna Bai	13,133	58.73	New
Independent	Zampa Bai	5,659	25.31	New
PSP	Bhimrao Patwardhan	3,569	15.96	New
Margin of victory		7,474	33.42	
Turnout		22,361	70.94	
Total valid votes		22,361		
Registered electors		31,523		
INC win (new seat)				

== See also ==
- Bidar (Lok Sabha constituency)
- Kalaburagi district
