= Umapur =

- village
- Location in Karnataka, India Umapur (India)
- Coordinates: 17°51′6″N 76°50′53″E
- Country: India
- State: Karnataka
- District: Bidar
- Taluk: Basavakalyan
- Lok Sabha Constituency: Bidar

Languages
  - Official: Kannada
- Time zone: UTC+5:30 (IST)
- Vehicle registration: KA 56

Umapur is a village in the Basavakalyan taluk of Bidar district in the Indian state of Karnataka.

== Demographics ==
Per the 2011 Census of India, Umapur has a total population of 1148; of whom 593 are male and 555 female.

== Uma Maheshwara Temple ==
Umapur is famous for the ancient 12th century Uma Maheshwara Temple, built during the chalukyan reign located in the village.

== Transport ==
Umapur is 16 km from Taluka headquarter Basavakalyan. It is well connected by road to Basavakalyan. Nearest major railway station is in Bidar.

== See also ==
- Aurad
- Basavakalyan
- Humnabad
- Bidar
