= M. G. Muley =

Indian politician and maratha leader

M G Muley

Member of the Karnataka Legislative Assembly
- In office 1999–2004
- Preceded by: Basavaraj Patil Attur
- Succeeded by: Mallikarjun Khuba
- Constituency: Basavakalyan

Member of the Karnataka Legislative Council
- Incumbent
- Assumed office 18 June 2024

Personal details
- Party: Bharatiya Janata Party

M G Muley (sometimes spelled M G Mule) is an Indian politician and Maratha leader. He served in the Maratha Development Corporation. and is currently serving as a member of the Karnataka Legislative Council since June 2024. He is a member of Bharatiya Janata Party.
