= Aurad Taluka =

Taluka in Bidar district, Karnataka, India

- Taluka
- Location of Aurad Taluka in Karnataka, India Aurad Taluka (India)
- Coordinates: 17.92°N 77.42°E
- Country: India
- State: Karnataka
- District: Bidar district
- Headquarters: Aurad

Government
  - Type: Taluka Panchayath
  - Body: Aurad Taluka Panchayath; Tehsildar

Area
  - Total: 1,086 km^{2} (419 sq mi)

Population (2011)
  - Total: 227,880
  - Density: 210/km^{2} (540/sq mi)

Languages
  - Official: Kannada
- Time zone: UTC+5:30 (IST)
- PIN Code: 585326; 585417; 585421; 585436; 585443
- STD Code: 08485
- ISO 3166 code: IND-KA
- Website: bidar.nic.in

Aurad taluka or Aurad taluk is one of the five administrative taluka (subdivision) of Bidar district, Karnataka, India. Headquartered at the town of Aurad, it spans 1,086 square kilometres (419 sq mi) and had a population of 227,880 in the 2011 Census. The region, historically part of Hyderabad State, has a semi-arid climate and an economy predominantly based on rain-fed agriculture. The local culture reflects both Kannada and Marathi influences due to its historical position within Hyderabad State.

== History ==
The area was historically part of Hyderabad State. Its socio-economic structure was shaped by the feudal jagir system. Following the States Reorganisation Act, 1956, the region became part of Mysore State (present-day Karnataka). This integration, along with subsequent land reforms, transformed its agrarian economy and social structure.

Aurad has been a core administrative unit in Bidar district, with an economy historically based on agriculture. Government archives document specific orders pertaining to the taluka, including a 1964 order related to land classifications under the Mysore Land Revenue Act and 1972 orders concerning land acquisition for the Karanja irrigation project.

== Geography ==
Aurad is one of five talukas in Bidar district, situated in its northern sector. It includes 124 inhabited villages and 11 uninhabited ones.

=== Climate ===
The taluka has a semi-arid climate. The average annual rainfall is approximately 847 mm, with the South-West monsoon contributing about 76% of the total. Annual precipitation has ranged between 366.2 mm and 1344.6 mm. The effective monsoon season typically begins in mid-June and lasts for approximately 18 weeks.

=== Water resources ===
Agriculture is predominantly rain-fed and dependent on groundwater. Parts of Aurad are categorized as 'semi-critical' for groundwater extraction, with a noted decline in water levels. Water management infrastructure includes several irrigation tanks. Government initiatives have included building community irrigation wells and executing National Rural Water Supply Schemes.

=== Wildlife ===
The taluka's rural landscape supports wildlife, including sightings of nilgai (blue bull) herds in the Bidar district region.

== Demographics ==
According to the 2011 census, Aurad Taluka had a population of 227,880, with a sex ratio of 954 females per 1000 males and a literacy rate of 64.53%.

=== Language and culture ===
Kannada is the official language. Due to its history as part of Hyderabad State, Marathi and Deccani Urdu are also widely spoken, a fact reflected in the continued operation of Marathi-language primary schools. The local culture reflects both Kannada and Marathi traditions, with festivals and fairs often centered around village temples.

=== Education ===
Education infrastructure includes government and private primary and secondary schools. A 2021 comparative analysis of Bidar district's talukas listed Aurad Taluka's literacy rate as the second lowest among the five.

== Economy ==
Agriculture is the primary economic activity. Main crops include pulses (pigeon pea, green gram) and cereals (sorghum, maize). Most cultivation is rain-fed. Livestock rearing, particularly backyard poultry farming, is a significant source of supplementary income.

=== Development ===
In 2023, the Karnataka Renewable Energy Development Limited (KREDL) proposed establishing a 500-megawatt solar power park in the taluka. In response to water scarcity, watershed development projects have been initiated, including 'Project Jeevan Dhara' launched through a memorandum of understanding between Toyota Kirloskar Motor and the Watershed Organisation Trust in January 2025. Aurad has been identified as a backward region eligible for development grants.

== Villages ==
Aurad Taluka consists of 124 inhabited villages. Notable villages include the taluk headquarters of Aurad, as well as Santhpur, Medpalli, Chintaki, and Nagamarapalli.

== See also ==
- Aurad (Taluk headquarters town)
- Bidar district
- List of taluks of Karnataka
- Hyderabad State
- Administrative divisions of Karnataka
