= Janwada =

Janwada Janawada
- Village
- Interactive map of Janwada
- Location in Karnataka, India Janwada (India)
- Coordinates: 18.002077°N 77.480904°E
- Country: India
- State: Karnataka
- District: Bidar
- Taluka: Bidar

Government
  - Type: Gram Panchayat
  - Body: Janwada Gram Panchayat

Area
  - Total: 1,372 km^{2} (530 sq mi)
- Elevation: 549 m (1,801 ft)

Population (2011)
  - Total: 6,031
  - Density: 4.4/km^{2} (11/sq mi)
- Demonym(s): Janwadakar, Janwadavaru

Languages
  - Official & Regional: Kannada
- Time zone: UTC+5:30 (IST)
- Pin Code: 585402
- Vehicle registration: KA 38

Janawada is a large village and gram panchayat in Bidar taluka of the Indian state of Karnataka. It is known for its Sikh Gurudwara.

== Demographics ==
As of 2011 India census, Janwada had a population of 6031 with 3062 males and 2969 females.

== See also ==
- Bidar
- Districts of Karnataka
