= National Highway 218 (India) =

National Highway in India

National Highway 218
- Map of National Highway 218 in red

Route information
- Auxiliary route of NH 18
- Length: 65.2 km (40.5 mi)

Major junctions
- South end: Purulia
- North end: Dhanbad

Location
- Country: India
- States: West Bengal, Jharkhand

Highway system
- Roads in India; Expressways; National; State; Asian
← NH 18	→ NH 18

National Highway 218, commonly referred to as NH 218 is a national highway in India. It is a secondary route of National Highway 18. NH-218 runs in the states of West Bengal and Jharkhand in India.

== Route ==
NH218 connects Purulia, Chandakyari, Jhariya and Dhanbad in the states of West Bengal and Jharkhand.

== Auxiliary Routes ==
NH218 has 2 auxiliary routes connecting different parts of Jharkhand & West Bengal. National Highway 218A(NH218A) connects Purulia with Raghunathpur, Dishergarh & ending in Neamatpur on NH-19 in the state of West Bengal. This route runs for 82 kilometres (51 mi) & also Locally known as Purulia-Asansol Road. National Highway 218B(NH218B) connects Purulia with Chaklator, Barabazar, Banduan, Duarsini ending on NH-18 in Galudih in the State of Jharkhand. It is famous for Duarsini Ghat section & Locally known as Purulia-Banduan-Galudih Road & is 89.8 kilometres (55.8 mi) in length.

== Junctions ==
NH 18 Terminal near Purulia.
NH 2 Terminal near Dhanbad.

== See also ==
- List of national highways in India
- List of national highways in India by state
