= Kamalnagar =

Kamalanagar
- Town
- Nickname: Lotus City
- Location in Karnataka, India Kamalanagar (India)
- Coordinates: 17.80°N 77.36°E
- Country: India
- State: Karnataka
- District: Bidar
- Established: 1912
- Founder: Kamal Pasha
- Named for: Kamal Sarovar near railway station

Government
  - Type: Municipal
  - Body: Council

Area
  - Total: 21.48 km^{2} (8.29 sq mi)
- Elevation: 712 m (2,336 ft)

Population (2021)
  - Total: 34,784
  - Density: 1,432/km^{2} (3,710/sq mi)
- Demonym: Kamalnagarkar

Languages
  - Official: Kannada
- Time zone: UTC+5:30 (IST)
- pin code: 585417
- Vehicle registration: KA 38

Kamalnagar is a town and headquarters of Kamalnagar taluka in Bidar district in the South Indian state of Karnataka.

== History ==
Kamalnagara became a taluk in 2017. Kamalnagara has the biggest panchayat in the district.

Shri GIRISH DHANRAJ WADEYAR R/O Thana Kushnoor became The First Taluka Panchayat President of Kamalnagar Taluka Panchayat. He created History by taking charge as the First Official Taluka Panchayat President ( Adhyaksha ) of Kamalnagar on 7 november 2020. During his tenure, He played a crucial role in establishing the initial admistrative framework and Rural development initiatives for the newly formes taluk. Kamalnagar taluka has a National Highway 50(NH) that connects to Nanded in Maharashtra and Bidar city in Karnataka. Kamalnagar has railway connectivity.

== Demographics ==
In the 2021 Indian census, Kamalnagara had a population of 34,784 of whom 19,462 were males and 15,321 were females.

== See also ==
- Bidar
- Districts of Karnataka
