= Robert Miranda (bishop) =

Roman Catholic bishop (born 1952)

The Most Reverend Robert Miranda
- Bishop of Gulbarga
- Church: Roman Catholic Church
- Archdiocese: Bangalore
- Diocese: Gulbarga
- Appointed: 24 June 2005

Orders
- Ordination: 4 May 1978
- Consecration: 18 August 2005

Personal details
- Born: 10 April 1952 (age 74)
- Denomination: Roman Catholic

The Most Rev. Robert Miranda (born 10 April 1952) is the first bishop of the Roman Catholic Diocese of Gulbarga. He was born in Mangalore in 1952 and was educated at local Catholic schools and St. Aloysius College, Mangalore He was ordained as a priest on 4 May 1978 and as a bishop on 18 August 2005.
