= Bidar taluk =

Bidar Taluka ಬೀದರ ತಾಲುಕಾ
- Taluka/ tehsil
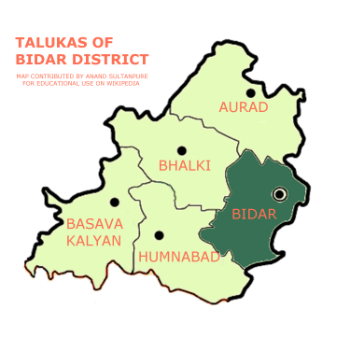
- Map of Bidar Taluka in the Bidar District

- Location in Karnataka
- Coordinates: 17°53′N 077°28′E
- Country: India
- State: Karnataka
- District: Bidar district
- Member of Legislative Assembly: Rahim Khan (Bidar Assembly constituency)
- Member of Legislative Assembly: Dr. Shailendra Beldale (Bidar South Assembly constituency)
- Assembly Seats: Two: Bidar North; Bidar South

Government
  - Type: Taluka Panchayat
  - Body: Bidar Taluka Panchayath

Area
  - Taluka/ tehsil: 926 km^{2} (358 sq mi)
  - Under Forest: 84.27 km^{2} (32.54 sq mi)
- Elevation: 710 m (2,330 ft)

Population (2020)
  - Taluka/ tehsil: 578,027
  - Estimate (2021): 541,290
  - Density: 624/km^{2} (1,620/sq mi)
  - Urban: 213,593
  - Rural: 253,021
  - Metro: 650,000
  - Male Population: 239,666
  - Male Population density: 259/km^{2} (670/sq mi)
  - Female Population: 226,948
  - Female Population density: 245/km^{2} (630/sq mi)

Sex Ratio
  - per 1000 males: 947 females
  - in the age group 0-6: 931

Literacy Rate
  - Rural: 65.03%
  - Urban: 87.54%
- Vehicle registration: KA-38
- Police Stations: 9
- Prison(s): 1
- Prisoners: 103
- Fire Stations: 1
- Fire Engine Tankers: 4
- Ration Shops: 201
- No. of Villages: 124
- No. of Hamlets: 29
- No. of Gram Panchayats: 33
- No. of Industrial Units: 280
- Raingauge Stations: 7
- Annual Normal Rainfall: 998 millimetres (39.3 inches)
- No. of Post Offices: 63
- Electricity Consumption: 1608.57 Lakh U

Bidar taluka is one of the eight talukas of Bidar district. Its administrative headquarters is in the town of Bidar, along with the district's headquarters. The major river is the Manjira which forms the northern border of the taluka. As of 2008, 611 square kilometres (150,981 acres) of the land was under cultivation in the taluka, of that 19% or 118 square kilometres (29,158 acres) was irrigated. Irrigation is 52% from dug wells, 44% from bore holes, and the rest from is mostly from tanks (reservoir ponds) and lift irrigation from the Manjira.

== List of Villages in Bidar district ==
1. Alamkeri
2. Aliabad (OG)
3. Aliamber
4. Allapur
5. Almaspur
6. Ambalpad
7. Amlapur
8. Andura
9. Ashtoor
10. Atwal
11. Aurad (S)
12. Ayazpur
13. Bag - E - Karanja (OG)
14. Bagdal
15. Bage-E-Gornalli
16. Bage-Shahi
17. Bahirnahalli
18. Bahirnalli
19. Bakchawadi
20. Bambalgi
21. Bapur
22. Baridabad
23. Barur
24. Basanthpur
25. Baugi
26. Bawalpur
27. Bellura
28. Benakanalli
29. Bhangoor
30. Bidar (CMC + OG)
31. Bompalli
32. Budhera
33. Chambool
34. Chatnalli
35. Chaver Fathepur
36. Chikpet
37. Chillargi
38. Chimkod
39. Chintalgera
40. Chitta
41. Chondi
42. Chouli
43. Daddapur
44. Dattankeri
45. Dharmapur
46. Fathepur
47. Gadgi
48. Gandhi Nagar
49. Ghodepalli
50. Ghumma
51. Goonalli
52. Gornalli(B)
53. Gouspur
54. Gumtapur
55. Hallikhed (B)
56. Hamilapur
57. Hippalgaon
58. Hochaknalli
59. Hokrana(B)
60. Hokrana(K)
61. Honaddi
62. Honnakheri
63. Imampur
64. Immamabad
65. Indira Nagar
66. Islampur
67. Jampad
68. Janwada
69. Kabirwada
70. Kadwad
71. Kamthana
72. Kanalli
73. Kangankot
74. Kangathi
75. Kaplapur (J)
76. Kaplapur (A)
77. Kasimpur (Chitgoppa)
78. Kasimpur (Pan)
79. Khadernagar
80. Khajapur
81. Kolhar (B)
82. Kolhar (K)
83. Madaknalli
84. Magdal
85. Mahamdapur
86. Malegaon
87. Malik Mirzapur
88. Malkapur
89. Mamankeri
90. Manhalli
91. Markhal
92. Markunda
93. Mirzapur
94. Mirzapur Taj
95. Mohillatte-Gornalli
96. Nagora
97. Nandagaon
98. Naulaspur
99. Nawadgeri
100. Nelwad
101. Nematabad
102. Nidwancha
103. Nizampur
104. Odwada
105. Paterpalli
106. Qutubabad
107. Rajgera
108. Rajnal
109. Ranjolkheni
110. Rasoolabad
111. Rekulgi
112. Sangahalli
113. Sangolgi
114. Sangvi
115. Satoli
116. Secundrapur
117. Shahpur
118. Shamrajapur
119. Shamshirnager
120. Shekapur
121. Siddapur
122. Sindhol
123. Sippalgeri
124. Sirimandal
125. Sirkatnalli
126. Sirsi (A)
127. Soupur
128. Sultanpur (J)
129. Sultanpur (Qudem)
130. Tadpalli
131. Tajlapur
132. Telang - Mirzapur
133. Vilaspur
134. Yadlapur
135. Yakatpur
136. Yarnalli (Deshmukh)
137. Yarnhalli (Pahilwan)
138. Zamistanpur
