= Basavakalyan =

City in Karnataka, India

- City
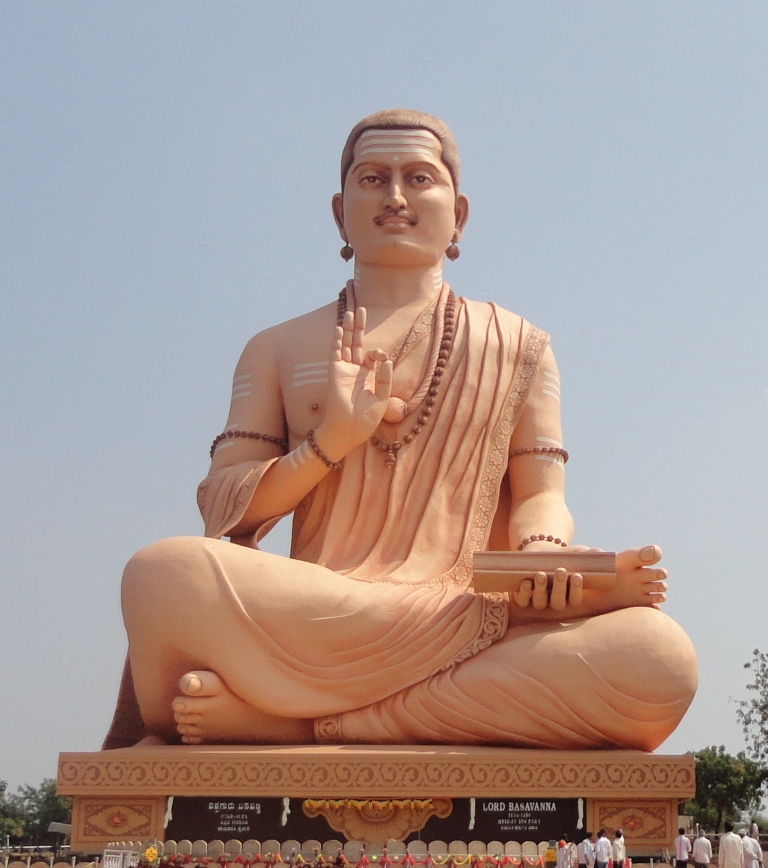
- Basavanna statue, 108 feet (33 m)
- Nicknames: The City of Anubhava Mantapa; Kalyani
- Location in Karnataka, India Basavakalyan (Karnataka)
- Coordinates: 17°52′22″N 76°56′59″E
- Country: India
- State: Karnataka
- Division: Kalaburagi
- Region: Bayaluseeme
- District: Bidar district
- Taluka: Basavakalyan taluka

Government
  - Type: Municipal Council
  - Body: Basavakalyan City Panchayat

Area
  - Total: 32 km^{2} (12 sq mi)
- Elevation: 621 m (2,037 ft)

Population (2011)
  - Total: 69,717
  - Density: 2,200/km^{2} (5,600/sq mi)
  - Males: 36,116
  - Females: 33,601
- Demonym(s): Basavakalyani, Kalyani

Languages
  - Official language: Kannada
- Time zone: UTC+5:30 (IST)
- PIN: 585 327
- Telephone code: 08481
- Vehicle registration: KA-56
- Website: www.basavakalyancity.mrc.gov.in

Basavakalyan or Basavakalyana is a historical city and municipal council in the Bidar District of the Indian state of Karnataka. It was the capital of the Kalyani Chalukyas and the Kalachuris of Kalyani. The city is noted for the world's tallest Basavanna statue, which stands 108 feet (33 m) high, and is today one of the major cities and an important industrial hub of Bidar district.

== History ==
Before India's independence, Basavakalyan was called Kalyani. After independence and the division of states on a linguistic basis in 1956, Kalyana was renamed as BasavaKalyan in memory of Basava, a social reformer who established Anubhava Mantapa (spiritual democracy) in 12th-century India.

Basavakalyan was ruled by Western Chalukyas, Kalachuris of Kalyani, Yadavas of Devagiri, Kakatiyas, Delhi Sultanate, Bahamani Sultanate, Bidar Sultanate, Bijapur Sultanate, Mughals and Hyderabad Nizams.

=== Western Chalukyas ===
It was the royal capital of the Western Chalukya (Kalyani Chalukyas) dynasty from 1050 to 1195. Someshvara I (1041–1068) made Kalyana as his capital, recognised as Kalyani Chalukyas to differentiate from Badami Chalukyas. Later ruled by Someshvara II, Vikramaditya VI, Someshvara III, Jagadhekamalla III and Tailapa III. King Someshwara I (1042–1068 CE) moved the capital from Manyakheta (present Malkhed in Kalaburagi district) to Kalyani. During the 10th to 12th centuries he ruled nearly half of India, most of the western Deccan and South India. King Vikramaditya VI had scholars in his court such as Someshwara, Bilhana (poet of Kashmir) and Vigyaneshwara (legal expert). On 26 February 1077 Coronation of Vikramaditya VI started Chalukya Vikrama Varsha Jalsangi Temple.

==== Kalyani Chalukya architecture ====
The earliest examples of the Kalyani Chalukya style are found at Kuknur. The Kalleshvara and Navalinga temples here bear resemblances to the early Chalukya group of Aihole and Pattadkal. The Jaina temple at Lakkundi near Gadag forms the next step in the improvement of this style introducing a greater ornamental effect in the treatment of the surface.

The Kalyani style of architecture reached its maturity and culmination in the 12th century. Kasi Vishveshvara at Lakkundi, Mallikarjuna at Kuruvatti and Mahadeva Temple (Itagi) are the finest examples produced by the later Chalukya architects. The Saraswathi and Someshwara temples at Gadag are in a mutilated condition. There are nearly one hundred monuments of the period, scattered all over the Deccan, giving us information about the artistic excellence attained by the later Chalukyas of Kalyani.

=== Kalachuris and Basaveshwara ===
Kalachuris of Kalyani succeeded Kalyani Chalukyas continued Kalyani as their capital. During the 12th century the Kalachuris of Kalyani King Bijjala (1156–1167) assumed the throne, and Basaveshwara was appointed as his prime minister. Basaveshwara led a social movement to stop untouchability and gender discrimination, Shivasharana revolution took place. Basaveshwara motivated many with the Vachana sahitya, and more than 600 people became writers called Vachanakaras.

== Centre of social and religious movement ==
The centre of a great social and religious movement. In the 12th century, because of the social reformer Basava, it became a seat of learning. Basava, Akka Mahadevi, Channabasavanna, Siddarama and other Sharanas are associated with Basavakalyan. Basava, who fought against orthodoxy in Hinduism.

Basava was a great revolutionary who established spiritual democracy called "Anubhava Mantapa" in the 12th century in India (Anubhava Mantapa – which is also called as the "First Parliament of the World". It was led by Saint Allamprabhu), and gave practical solutions to all kinds of problems mankind was suffering at that time. His teachings are time tested, scientific and proven. Basava-Tatva is a never ending inspiration to achieve the welfare of mankind.

== Tourism ==
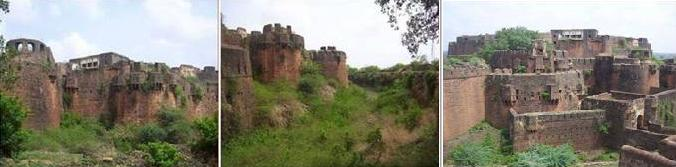
Basavakalyan Fort

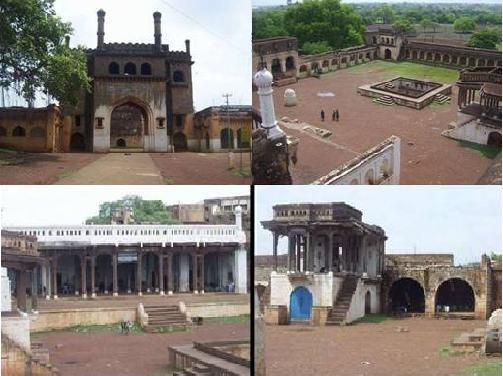
Basavakalyan Fort

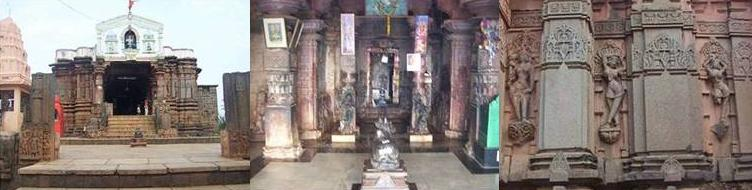
Basavakalyan Temple

At Jalasangvi, Narayanapura and Shivapura there are temples of the Chalukya dynasty. Basaveshvara temple is at the centre of Basavakalyan. There are some Islamic monuments Moti Mahal, Hydari Mahal, Peeran Durga. And other religious places such as Gachchina Matha, Kambali Matha and Sadananda Matha.

- Basavakalyana Fort was constructed by Chalukyas. Later on it was under the Nizam's rule.

There is a museum in a side fort and has immense collection of historic valuables and information. There are Jain idols of the 10th-11th century.

- Historical Lord Shiva Temple constructed by Chalukyas during the 12th century at Narayanpur village (just 2.5 km away from Basavakalyan)
- 108 feet statue of Basaveshwara
- Sai Baba Temple
- Munde Pali Hanuman Temple
- Basaveshwara Temple
- Anubhava Mantapa
- Maridevara Gudda - Gavimath
- Hingulambika Mandir.
- There is a statue of Allamaprabhu, as the guru of the Basavanna and the related photos of Basavanna which he has worked for the people.
- There is a lake beside it and full of trees surrounding its Temple.
- Basava Dharma Peetha Charitable Trust with the intention of reviving Sharana cultural heritage purchased a land of 3 acres on 21-12-2001 by the side of the main road nearby the entrance of Basava Kalyana town. Later on the Trust purchased 17.5 acres just adjacent to the previous land and has built a prayer hall and living rooms. Haralayya Tirtha - an attractive water reservoir is formed.
- Sri Basaveswara cave and Akkamahadevi cave have been chiselled and carved in laterite rock-soil. Sharana village formed pictures the concept of 12th century Sharanas engaged actively in their kayakas (occupations).
- The Trust is running an orphanage. There is a hillock which is named as Sharana Shaila. On Sharana Shaila is erected Lord Basavanna's statue of 108’ height. It is structured on a pedestal of 24 feet height, 60’ x 80’ size. Ruins of lord Shiva temple of great architectural styles and written scripts can be found in a village soldapka, which is situated 20 km away from Basavakalyan.

== Education ==
Basavakalyan is renowned for its educational heritage. It hosts a large number of educational institutes. Ideal Global School is one of the first CBSE schools in the city. The following table names a few of them:

School	PU College	Degree College
Ideal Global School (CBSE)	Ideal PU College integrated with NEET/ JEE/ K-CET	Ideal Degree College (B.SC/B.A)
Ideal Public School (KSEEB)	--	--

Type	Names
School	Shantinikethan Primary and High School (Kannada)

type	Name	
Pre-University College	SSKB College of Arts and Science Basavakalyan	Allamprabhu PU college(Science)
	The city also has one Engineering College, which is Basavakalyan Engineering College situated in NH65, Kouiyal, Basavakalyan, Bidar Karnataka	

== Hospitals ==
- Mulge Multispeciality Hospital. Hiremath Colony
- Manthale Hospital
- Basnale Multi-speciality Hospital
- Devi Kripa Clinic Rajeshwar
- Viom Hospital Basavakalyan.
- Government Hospital
- Patil Hospital. Shivpur Road
- Biradar Hospital
- New Rifa Hospital
- Suryavanshi Hospital
- Care Hospital
- Mukambika Hospital
- ARK Chowdhary Hospital
- karbari multispecility hospital
- S V Reddy Hospital

== Software companies ==
- Rishitya Technologies
- SriOne Technologies

== Geography ==
Basavakalyan is located at 17.87°N 76.95°E. It has an average elevation of 621 metres (2037 feet).

== Demographics ==
Includes Sikhs (0.02%), Buddhists (1.75%), Jain (0.03%)

Religions in Basavakalyan
Religion	Percent
Hindu	56.20%
Muslim	41.08%
Christians	0.15%
Others	2.11%

As of the 2011 Census of India, the city of Basavakalyan had a population of 69,717, of which 36,116 were males while 33,601 were females. Kannada language is spoken by the majority of the population. Marathi, Hindi and Urdu are also spoken in the town.

The population of children aged between 0 and 6 was 9,949 which was 14.27% of the total population of Basavakalyan (CMC). In Basavakalyan, the sex ratio was 930 females to 1,000 males, against the Karnataka state average of 973 females to 1,000 males. Moreover, the child sex ratio in Basavakalyan was around 879, compared to the state average of 948. The literacy rate of Basavakalyan was 77.46%, higher than the state average of 75.36%. Male literacy rate was around 82.46% while female literacy rate was 72.13%.

== See also ==
- Narayanapur, Bidar
- Umapur
- Bhalki
- Ulavi
- Kudalasangama
- Kalyana Karnataka
- Jangam
