= Bidar district =

District in Karnataka, India

- District of Karnataka
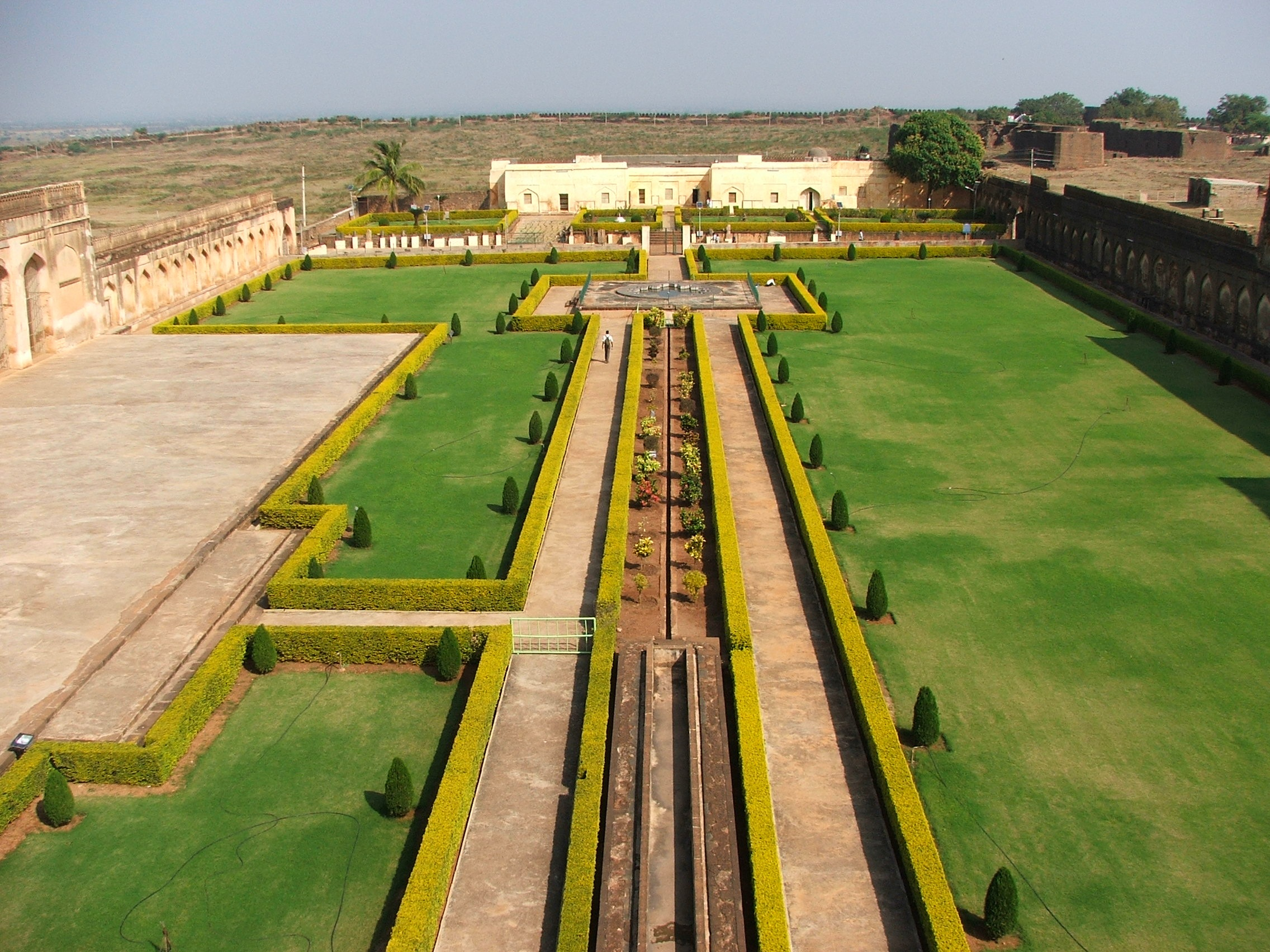
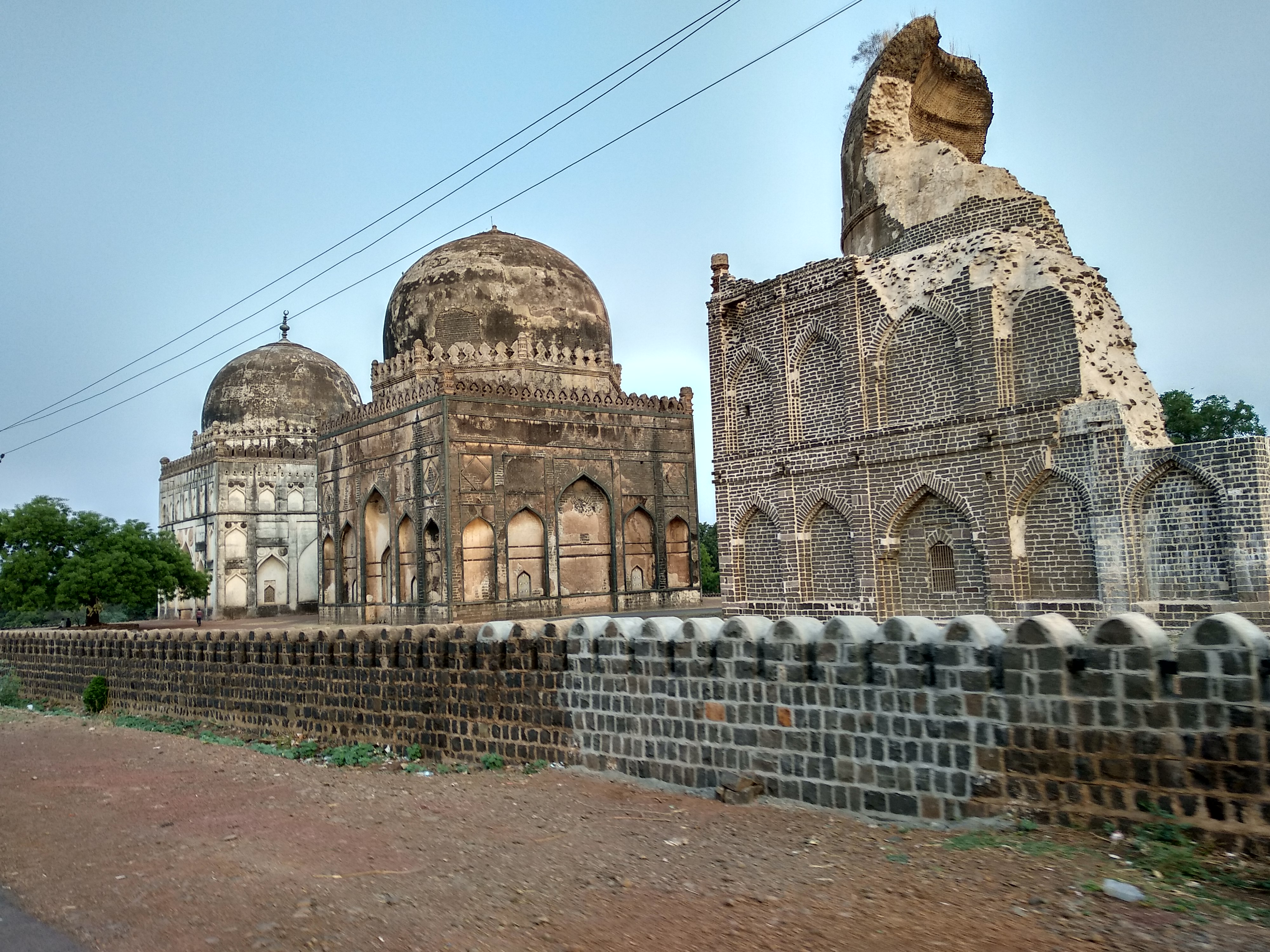
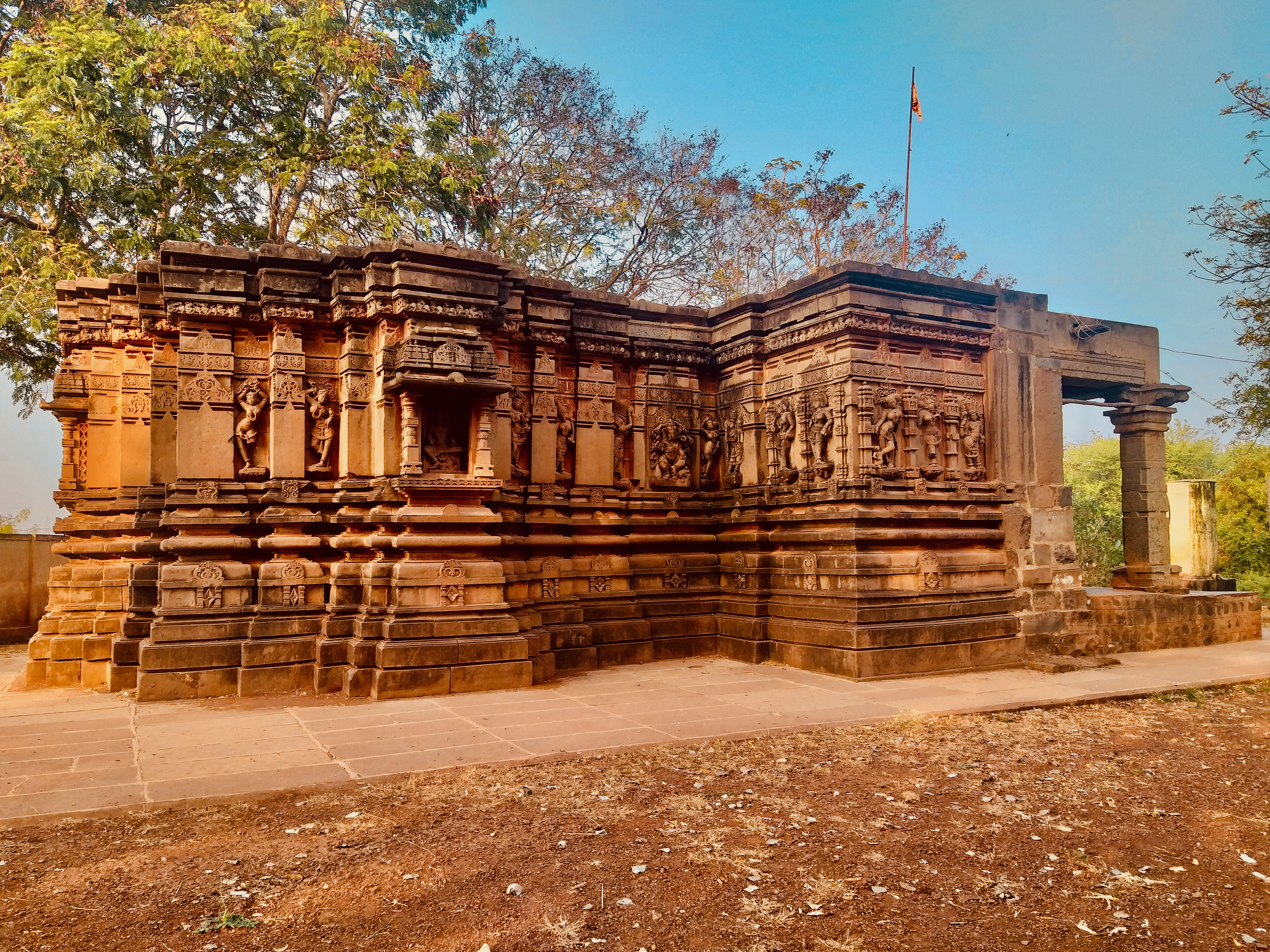
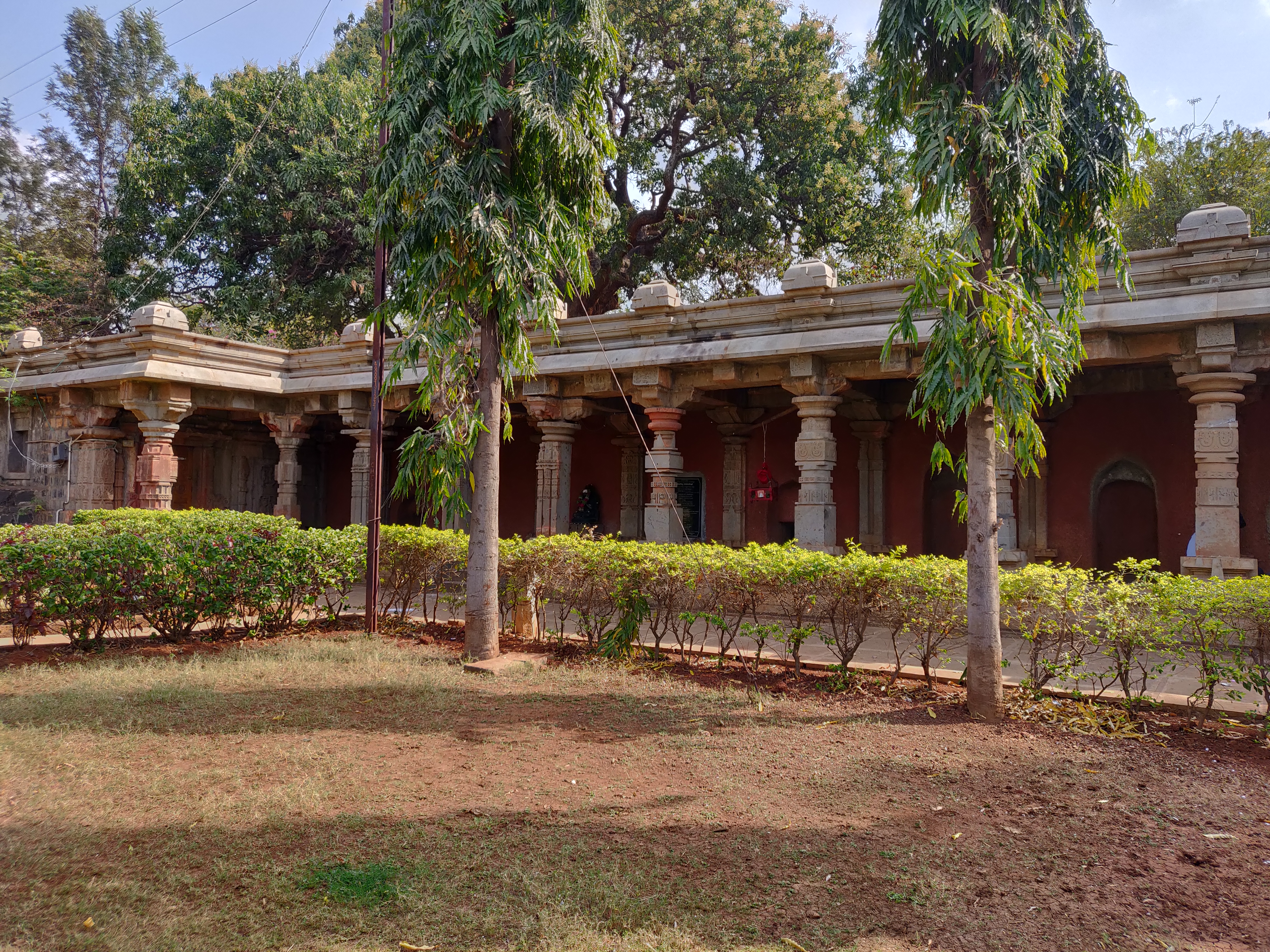
- Clockwise from top-left: Bidar Fort, Tombs of the Bahmani Sultans in Ashtur, Akka Nagamma Cave in Basavakalyan, Blackbuck sanctuary, Kamaleshwara Temple
- Nicknames: ಕರ್ನಾಟಕದ ಕೀರಿಟ (English: Crown of Karnataka); Northeast Gateway of Karnataka; Sorghum Land
- Interactive map of Bidar district
- Coordinates: 17.35°N 18.25°E
- Country: India
- State: Karnataka
- Headquarters: Bidar
- Division: Kalaburagi Division
- Region: Kalyana-Karnataka
- Talukas (Tehsils): Aurad; Basavakalyan; Bhalki; Bidar; Chitgoppa; Hulsoor; Humnabad; Kamalnagar
- Formation: 1 November 1956 (69 years ago)
- Founder: Government of Karnataka
- District Chief Executive Officer: Dr. Girish Dilip Badole, IAS
- Assistant Commissioners: Sri. Md Shakeel, KAS (Bidar Assistant Commissioner); Sri. Mukul Jain, IAS (Basavakalyan Assistant Commissioner)
- District Forest Officer and Conservator: Vaanathi M M, IFS
- Lok Sabha Constituency: Bidar Lok Sabha constituency

Government
  - Type: Zilla Panchayat (District Administration)
  - Body: Bidar district Panchayat
  - Member of Parliament (Lok Sabha): Sagar Khandre (Indian National Congress)
  - District Commissioner and District Election Commissioner: Shilpa Sharma, IAS
  - Additional District Commissioner: Shivanand B Karale, KAS
  - Superintendent of Police: Pradeep Gunti, IPS

Area
  - Total: 5,448 km^{2} (2,103 sq mi)
  - Urban: 165 km^{2} (64 sq mi)
  - Rural: 5,283 km^{2} (2,040 sq mi)
  - Forest cover: 436 km^{2} (168 sq mi)
  - Land: 150,981 km^{2} (58,294 sq mi)
- Elevation: 615 m (2,018 ft)
- Highest elevation: 715 m (2,346 ft)

Population (2011)
  - Total: 1,703,300
  - Estimate (2021): 1,927,828
  - Rank: 287 (out of 640)
  - Density: 312.6/km^{2} (809.8/sq mi)
  - Urban: 425,952
  - Urban density: 165/km^{2} (430/sq mi)
  - Rural: 1,277,348
  - Rural density: 5,283/km^{2} (13,680/sq mi)
  - Male Population: 870,665
  - Male Population density: 159/km^{2} (410/sq mi)
  - Female Population: 832,635
  - Female Population density: 153/km^{2} (400/sq mi)

Sex ratio
  - per 1000 males: 956 females
  - in the age group 0-6: 942

Literacy rate
  - Average: 70.51%
  - Male: 79.09%
  - Female: 61.55%
- Time zone: UTC+5:30 (IST)
- Pin Code: 585XXX
- Telephone Code: +91-(0)8482 XXXXXX
- ISO 3166 code: IND-KA
- Vehicle registration: Bidar KA-38; Bhalki KA-39; Basavakalyana KA-56
- Hobli(s): 30
- Zilla Panchayat Member(s): 34
- Taluka Panchayat Member(s): 131
- Gram Panchayat Member(s): 3314
- MLC: 04
- Airport: Bidar
- Gram Panchayat(s): 186
- MLA: 06
- Taluka(s): 08
- Railway Station: Bidar
- South MLA: Dr. Shailendra Beldale
- Precipitation: 847 millimetres (33.3 in)
- No. of villages: 699
- Website: bidar.nic.in

Bidar district is a district located in the northernmost part of the Karnataka state in India. The administrative headquarters of district is Bidar city. Geographically, it is known as the "Crown of the State", occupying its northeastern end. It is bounded by Kamareddy and Sangareddy districts of Telangana state on the eastern side, Latur and Osmanabad districts of Maharashtra state on the western side, Nanded district of Maharashtra state on the northern side and Kalaburagi district on the southern side.

The Bidar district is constituted by eight talukas, namely Bidar, Humnabad, Bhalki, Aurad, Hulsoor, Chitgoppa, Kamalnagar and Basavakalyan with Bidar being the headquarters of the district. Bidar district is connected with the NH-9 and NH-218 highways.

== History ==
Traditional tales refer to the surrounding region of Bidar district as "Viduranagara" and also as the place where Nala and Damayanthi met. The area was ruled by the Mauryas, Satavahanas, Rashtrakutas, Chalukyas, Kalachuris, Kakatiyas, Khaljis, Bahamanis, Baridshahis, Mughals and the Nizams of Hyderabad. The great revolution by Shivasharanas in the 12th century, encompassed social, literacy and religious fields emerged here. Culture, fine arts and architecture nurtured by successive rulers has contributed to its cultural richness. There are more Hindus and Muslims in this district. Similarly, social and religious reformers such as Basaveshwara and Guru Nanak also played a significant role in social reformation based on equality.

Bidar district is well known for its different religions, castes and cultures due to its historical developments through the ages.

=== Early and medieval history ===
The first Rashtrakuta capital was Mayurkhandi (Morkhandi) in the present day Bidar district. The regal capital was later moved to Manyakheta (Malkhed) in the present day Kalaburagi district by Amoghavarsha I.

Kalyani (today called Basavakalyan, after Basaveshwara) in Bidar district was the capital of Western Chalukyas, who were also called Kalyani Chalukyas after their capital. The Kalachuris continued with Kalyani as their capital.

Later, Bidar was ruled in succession by the vassals to Sevuna Yadavas of Devagiri, Kakatiyas of Warangal, Alauddin Khalji and Muhammad bin Tughluq.

The generals of Muhammad Bin Tughlaq who were nominated as viceroys of the newly conquered Deccan region broke up and formed the Bahmani Sultanate under Allauddin Hasan Gangu Bahman Shah.

The Bahmani capital was shifted from Kalburgi or Kalubaruge (pronounced as Gulbarga and subsequently renamed Ahsanabad by the Muslim newcomers) to Bidar (renamed Muhammadabad by the Bahmanis) in 1425. Bidar remained the capital until the Sultanate's breakup after 1518. It then became the center of the Barid Shahis, one of the five independent sultanates known as the Deccan sultanates. These were the successor states to the Bahmani kingdom.

The Bidar Sultanate was absorbed by the Bijapur Sultanate to the west in 1619, which was in turn included into their Deccan province by the Mughal Emperor Aurangzeb during his viceroyship of Deccan in 1656. After the death of Aurangazeb, Asaf Jah I, the Mughal Subehdar of the Deccan province, became independent and assumed the title Nizam-ul-mulk, with the whole of the province under the Nizam's sovereign control.

After Independence, Bidar district, along with Gulbarga, Bijapur and Raichur districts, became part of Karnataka.

== Geography ==
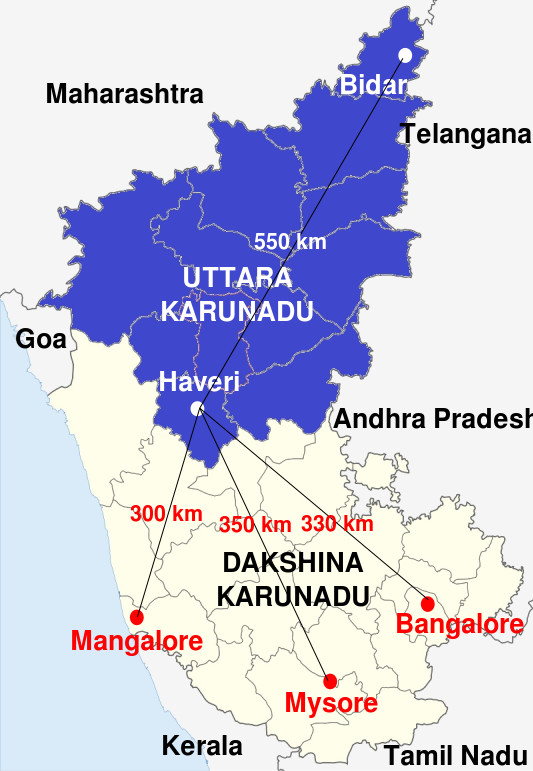
Distance from major cities of Karnataka to Bidar

The total geographical area of the district as per the provisional figures computed by the Survey of India is 5,451 km^{2} (2,105 sq mi), while the reporting area of the district for land-utilisation purposes, as worked out by the State Department of Survey Settlement and Land Records and local bodies, is 5,448 km^{2} (2,103 sq mi).

=== Topography ===
The district extends from latitude 17.35'N to 18.25'N and from the longitudes 76.42'E to 77.39'E which is located on the northern maidans of Karnataka which provides a mountainous treeless expansive plateau landscape. The ancient schistose rocks are covered by the Deccan Traps (Cretaceous Eocene). The most remarkable character of these traps is their perfectly horizontal disposition. The traps weather with a characteristic spheroidal weathering and the trap area is strewn with numerous dark-coloured boulders of all shapes and sizes. The soils covering this region are black to deep brown in colour which are rich in humus and form some of the most valuable fertile lands in the country, well suited for cultivating pulses.

Physiographically, the district can be divided into two regions, the northern low lands and southern high lands. The southern high lands are popularly known as Bidar plateau, which is made up of laterite. The ground altitudes are varying from 420 to 684 m (1,378 to 2,244 ft) above sea level. Bidar plateau has an elevation range from 640 to 684 m (2,100 to 2,244 ft) above sea level. The ground surface is flat, gently sloping forming broad valleys and flat topped hills. Flat topped hills with step-like sides exhibit the terraced landscape. The southern half of the district is a high plateau about 715 m (2,346 ft) above mean sea level and are well drained.

==== Laterite ====
Laterite is a peculiar type of residual porous clayey rock, full of worm-like tubes mainly made up of hydrated oxides of iron and alumina, formed as end product of weathering of the underlying rocks. It is formed under special climatic conditions of alternating dry and wet seasons. Much of the silica is dissolved and carried away, leaving the weathered product rich in oxides of iron and aluminium. The laterite cappings over the bedrock range in thickness of 15 metres (49 ft) to 60 metres (200 ft). The best development of laterite can be seen in the Bidar, Basavakalyan and Humnabad talukas of the district.

=== Soil ===
The two important types of soils noticed in the district are black soils and lateritic soils.

- Black soils: Major parts of the district are made up of black soils derived from Deccan traps. These are deep black in colour and their texture varies from loam to clay. Lime concentration in this soil is high, resulting in poor infiltration capacities. Their infiltration characteristics are poor to moderate. This type of soils covers mainly in areas lying below 610 m (2,000 ft) contour and along the valley portions.
- Lateritic soils: A lateritic soil is confined to the central portion of the district. Lateritic soils are pale to bright red in colour and clay to clayey loam in nature. This soil has moderate to good infiltration characteristics. This type of soils covers mainly in areas lying above 610 metres (2,000 ft) contour.

The entire district forms a part of the Deccan Plateau and is made up mostly of solidified lava. The northern part of the district is characterized by expanses of level and treeless surface punctuated here and there by flat and undulating hillocks, black soils and basaltic rocks. Alluvial deposit is normally found along the banks of the Manjra river and its main tributaries.

The district is entirely covered by the Deccan trap flows of the tertiary period. The Deccan trap is composed of horizontal flows of basaltic lava. They generally form flat-topped hillocks and terrace-like features. The physical characteristics of individual flows show considerable variations. Some flows are hard and massive while others are weathered, soft and friable. This character has resulted in terraced landscape, suddenly ending in escarpments. The traps are seen generally 618 metres (2,028 ft) above mean sea level. These are jointed and show the characteristics of spherical weathering leaving massive hard cores. Columnar jointing is predominantly developed in these rocks, besides horizontal joints, which impart to the rocks bedded appearance. The top layers of the Deccan trap in parts of Bidar and Humnabad talukas are altered to reddish vesicular laterite, forming and extensive undulating plateau.

The surface of the plateau presents wide stretches of red plains, either waved over by light dry grasses alive with coveys of partridges and herds of deer, or mottled by every sort of cultivation for which artificial irrigation is not essential. The laterite must everywhere be pierced nearly to the subjacent trap to reach the perennial springs, so that the wells in the vicinity of the edges of the tableland (maidan) are of extraordinary depth. The stream-fed valleys and the tracts of mixed soil in the lowlands produce various fruits and grains, sugarcanes, and vegetables.

==== Minerals ====
The minerals found in the area are bauxite, kaolin and red ochre. A deposit of highly siliceous bauxite clay has been located about three kilometers south of Basavakalyan. Similar deposits are noticed near Alwal and Kamthana villages of Bidar taluka. A large deposit of Kaolin is located near Kamthana village. Red ochre deposits are found near Sirsi and Aurad Village.

=== Weather and climate ===
The district experiences semi-arid climate with extreme summer. The dust storms and severe heat waves are common in the district between April and May. Coldest months are December and January. The temperature varies in the district between 20 °C and 42 °C The summer season in Bidar starts in the first week of March and lasts until mid-June. This is followed by southwest monsoon which continues till late September, and from September to end of January is winter.

May is the hottest month with average daily maximum temperature of 38.8 °C while December is the coldest with average daily minimum of 16.4 °C, The highest temperature recorded at Bidar was 43.3 °C on 8 May 1931, and the lowest 3.9 °C on 5 January 1901.

The average annual precipitation at Bidar is 847 mm (33.3 in), with most of the rainfall received during the monsoon season. The variation in rainfall from year to year is large and the district is prone to drought.

=== River systems and drainage ===
The important rivers in the district are:

- Manjra
- Karanja (River)
- Chulki Nala
- Mullamari
- Gandrinala

The district has two river basins, the Godavari and the Krishna. Major parts of the district are covered by Godavari basin, drained by its two major tributaries the Manjra and the Karanja rivers. The Godavari basin extends to over 4,411 km^{2} (1,703 sq mi), of which Manjra covers up to 1,989 km^{2} (768 sq mi) and Karanja up to 2,422 km^{2} (935 sq mi). The Krishna basin covers 585 km^{2} (226 sq mi) of which Mullamari river basin covers 249 km^{2} (96 sq mi) and Gandarinala river basin covers 336 km^{2} (130 sq mi). The Manjra river is perennial river flows over a distance of 155 km (96 mi) in the central part of the district and flows in eastern direction with a meandering course. The Karanja river flows in northwestern direction for 74 km (46 mi) with Karanja reservoir being major water source. The river Mullamari takes its origin near Matala village of Basavakalyan taluk flows from west to east for a length of 38 km (24 mi) and then flows into Kalaburgi district and joins the river Kagna. The Kagna river is one of the main tributary of Bhima river. Besides, there are several streams, which are of ephemeral in nature. The drainage pattern in the district varies from sub-dendritic to dendritic and some streams have a sub parallel drainage to the main river.

These rivers and their rivulets are not navigable.

=== Forests ===
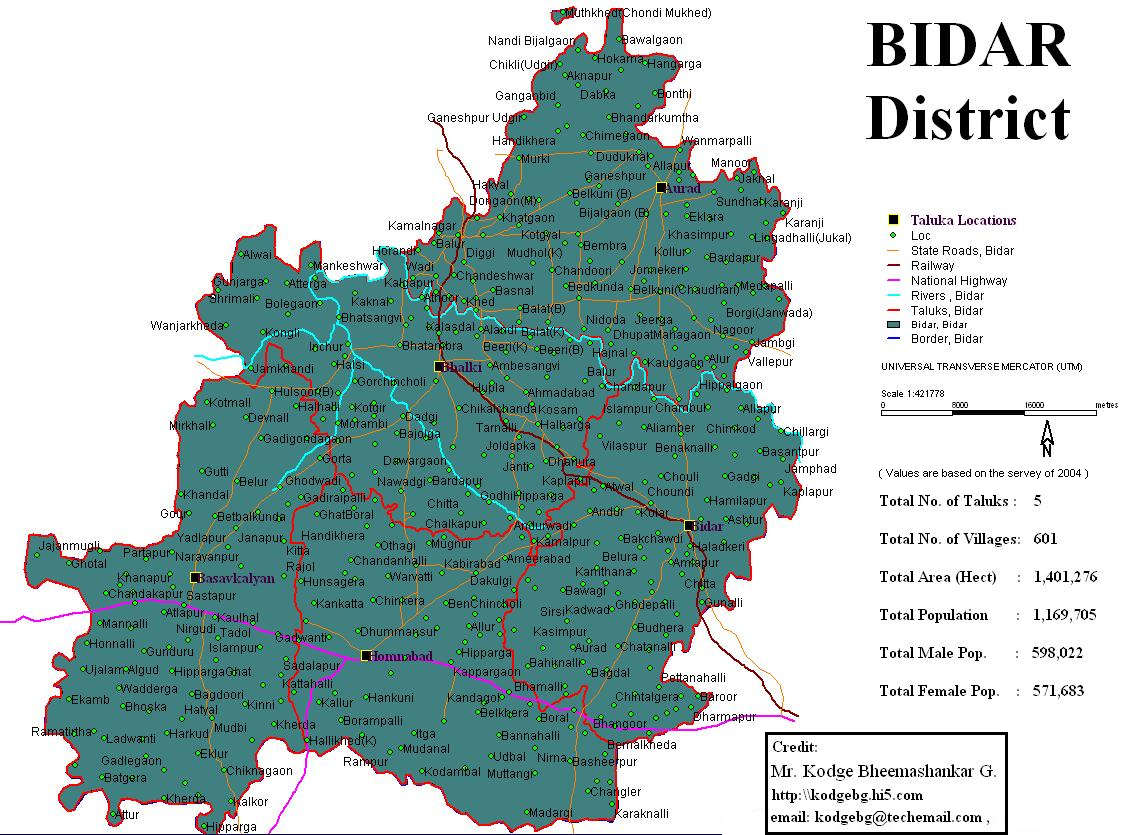
Location of the Bidar district with respect to the other districts in Karnataka

Bidar Forest Division is the northernmost division of Karnataka, encompassing the whole of Bidar district and 31 villages of the adjoining Gulbarga district. Classified under reserve forests, protected forests and unclassed forests, Bidar Forest Division has 435.92 km^{2} (168.31 sq mi) of its area under forest cover.

The forests are mainly dry deciduous and have scrub type vegetation. Over the years, almost all the forest areas have been worked on one or more times resulting in large expanses of man made forests consisting mostly of Eucalyptus, Acacia auriculiformis, Glyricidia, and miscellaneous species such as Hardwickia, Albizzia, Azadirachta, and Pterocarpus. The majority of these plantations are successful. Because of the sustained efforts of the forest department, the forest cover in the district has increased by about 4% as reported by the Hyderabad-based National Remote Sensing Agency.

Teak is found mixed with dry deciduous species. Ground cover is scanty and seedlings regeneration is practically absent. Thorny plants occur and tend to increase in proportion with heavy grazing, to which most of the area is subjected. Ground cover is scanty and seedlings regeneration is practically absent. Grazing incidence is heavy. This type of forest is found in Changlair, Karpakpalli and Karakanalli forests.

Acacia catechu, Acacia leucophloea, Wrightia tinctoria, Zizyphus xylopyrus, Cassia fistula, Annona species, Azadirachta indica, Butea monosperma, Chloroxylon switenia, Albizzia amara, etc. are widely seen in Ladwanthi, Kohinoor, Algood and Manhalli forests Basavakalyan range.

Out of the total forest area of 435 km^{2} (168 sq mi) in the division, more than 50 percent of the area is concentrated in Humnabad range, followed by Bidar range (20%) and Basavakalyan range. Aurad range is having the smallest area under the forest.

Viewed from the point of area under forests, the out-turn of forest produce and the revenue from forests Bidar division is not endowed with quality forest wealth. Out of the total geographical area of 5,448 km^{2} (2,103 sq mi) in Bidar division, an extent of 435.9 km^{2} (168.3 sq mi) under forests. In other words, this accounts for about 8.5 percent of the total geographical area. Area under forests in the division is very much below the state average.

==== Medicinal Plant Conservation Area ====
In Karpakpalli village of Humnabad taluk, a Medicinal Plant Conservation Area (MPCA) has been established. It is a part of Saidapur Reserve forest. Situated at an altitude of 600–700 meters, the MPCA is spread over about 150 hectares (370 acres). The terrain is undulating and the vegetation is the dry deciduous scrub type. It is the northernmost member of the Medicinal Plants Conservation Network established by the Karnataka forest department and the Foundation for Revitalization of Local Health Traditions (FRLHT) jointly. The uniqueness of the MPCA is characterized by representation of the medicinal flora of the driest regions of southern India.

The vegetation is the dry deciduous scrub type, with most of it being stunted due to harsh climatic and edaphic factors. The terrain is criss-crossed by a few small seasonal streams, which go dry soon after the monsoon. The MPCA contains about 289 species of flowering plants. Common tree species in the drier parts are Albizzia amara, Madhuca latifolia, Buchnania lanzan, Butea frondosa, Ficus bengalensis and Wrightia spp. Along the nullahs occur Terminalia arjuna and Syzigium spp. Shrubs include Gymnosporia, Ixora, Nyctanthes arbor-tristis and Nizyphus oenopia.

Overall about 193 medicinal plant species area found in the MPCA. It is home to highly endangered species Pterocarpus santalinus the Rakta chandana and Gloriosa superba. The most important are Hollorhina antidyssentrica and Santalum album. The presence of large number of medicinal plant species has helped the locals to take the advice of Nati vaidyas in the surrounding villages in case of any health problem. It is home to highly endangered species of Pterocarpus santalinus, the Rakta chandana and Gloriosa superba.

The area being highly valuable to the locals for medicinal plants a, local initiative to protect the highly valuable plant species in Karpakpally MPCA with active participation of the local villagers is also underway. An NGO, Kriyasheela Geleyaru, is involved in organizing local children and women disseminating knowledge about the locally available medicinal plants and the need to protect the ecosystem.

==== Red sanders ====
The southern and eastern parts of Bidar district support the growth of red sanders (Pterocarpus santalinus), which is highly valued. Owing to its dark red to almost black wood it is largely used for carving and ornamental work. The wood is in much demand for carved house posts. It is used in making musical instruments in Japan. Red sanders timber is a very good foreign exchange earner.

Red sanders has a very restricted natural range extending over an area of only 6000 sq. milies in south eastern portion of the Indian Peninsula. Its principal home is in the Sheshachalam hills of Cuddapah district of Andhra Pradesh and North Arcot district of Tamil Nandu besides southern and eastern parts of Bidar district.

=== Wildlife ===
The northern part of the state is generally considered to be a dry belt, devoid of water bodies, vegetation and wildlife. The surroundings of Bidar, the northernmost district, seem to be an exception.

There are no wildlife sanctuaries and national parks in the Bidar Forest Division. However, leopards may be seen occasionally far from human habitations. Langurs, wolves, spotted deer, wild boar, hares, porcupines, foxes, wild cats and jackals are also seen. In Karnataka, after Ranebennur Blackbuck Sanctuary in Haveri district and Jayamangali Blackbuck Conservation Reserve in Tumkur district, a sizeable population of near threatened species of blackbucks is found in the plains of Bidar District.

The existing natural water holes have to be developed by desilting. Herds of spotted deer and peafowl are found in Kamathana, Chitta, Shahapur and Godepalli forest areas. Poaching of deer in these areas is common. Hence, protection needs to be ensured. Creation of a wildlife sanctuary may be contemplated in the future when the number of wildlife increases. Some of the bigger trees act as a roosting place for peacocks, the national bird of India. The following forests support considerable wildlife:

- Narayanapur reserved forest in Basavakalyan range
- Dubalgundi and Benchincholi forest blocks in Humnabad range
- Kosam, Khanapur and Dhanura forests in Bhalki range

In addition to commonly found birds, varied species like green bee eaters, robins, sunbirds, red vented bulbuls, egrets, herons, ducks, cormorants, kingfishers, kites, eagles, peafowls and partridges can be seen. Rare birds and endangered species such as Indian coursers and vultures are often sighted.

Winter sees the arrival of aquatic migratory birds from regions as far as Siberia, Mongolia and Alaska. One study has recorded 74 species of aquatic birds in Bidar district, of which 32 species are migratory. Tanks and other water bodies at places like Janawada, Elaspur, Solpur, Papnash, Hallikhed, and Tripurant in the district, which have large quantities of fish and other aquatic animals, provide feeding grounds to various migratory birds like, black-necked stork, great stone plover, marsh sandpiper, and painted snipe.

== Demographics ==
Historical population
Year	Pop.	±% p.a.
1901	357,593	—
1911	425,339	+1.75%
1921	400,606	−0.60%
1931	438,695	+0.91%
1941	512,826	+1.57%
1951	551,048	+0.72%
1961	663,172	+1.87%
1971	824,059	+2.20%
1981	995,691	+1.91%
1991	1,255,799	+2.35%
2001	1,502,373	+1.81%
2011	1,703,300	+1.26%

Religions in Bidar district (2011)
Religion	Percent
Hinduism	75.72%
Islam	19.68%
Christianity	2.08%
Buddhism	1.79%
Other or not stated	0.73%

According to the 2011 census Bidar district has a population of 1,703,300, roughly equal to the nation of The Gambia or the US state of Nebraska. This gives it a ranking of 287th in India (out of a total of 640). Bidar district accounts for 2.84% of total area of the state and it is the home of 2.78% of the total population in the state. The district has a population density of 312 inhabitants per square kilometre (810/sq mi). Its population growth rate over the decade 2001-2011 was 13.16%. Bidar has a sex ratio of 952 females for every 1000 males, and a literacy rate of 71.01%. 25.01% of the population lives in urban areas. Scheduled Castes and Scheduled Tribes make up 23.47% and 13.85% of the population respectively.

=== Languages ===
Languages in Bidar district (2011)
1. Kannada (53.0%)
2. Marathi (18.4%)
3. Urdu (17.2%)
4. Telugu (4.25%)
5. Lambadi (3.60%)
6. Hindi (3.14%)
7. Other (0.47%)

According to the 2011 census, 52.97% of the population spoke Kannada, 18.41% Marathi, 17.16% Urdu, 4.25% Telugu, 3.60% Lambadi and 3.14% Hindi as their first language. Kannada is official and the most spoken language in the district. Marathi is spoken in villages and towns bordered with Maharashtra. Urdu and Hindi are spoken mainly in urban areas. Telugu is spoken by Telugu people who live in the areas of the district bordering Telangana. Lambadi is spoken by Banjara people.

=== Sandalwood carving ===
A locally less-known sandalwood carving at Bakchawadi village in the district produces woodworks of Buddha heads, handicraft items and prayer beads carved in red sandalwood to many countries in Europe and Asia.

== Facilities ==
=== Religious places ===
- Anubhava Mantapa, Basavakalyan
- Gurudwara Nanak Jhira Sahib
- Narasimha Jharni Cave Temple
- Shri Mailar Mallanna Devasthana, Mailar, Khanapur (Bhalki taluka)
- Shri Manik Prabhu Devasthanam, Manik Nagar (Humnabad taluka)

=== Hospitals ===
- Jijamata Hospital Bhalki
- Chandrakala memorial multi-speciality Bhalki
- Shedole Hospital Bhalki
- Jadhav Children's Hospital Bhalki
- Patil multi-speciality Hospital Bhalki
- Pawar Children's Hospital Bhalki
- Talwade Hospital Bhalki
- More children's Hospital Bhalki
- Mulge Multispeciality Hospital, Basavakalyan Bidar
- Gudge Hospital, Bidar
- Guru Nanak Hospital Bidar
- Dr Gurupadappa Nagamarpalli Hospital, Bidar

== Economy ==
In 2006 the Ministry of Panchayati Raj named Bidar one of the country's 250 most backward districts (out of a total of 640). It is one of the five districts in Karnataka currently receiving funds from the Backward Regions Grant Fund Programme.

=== Agriculture ===
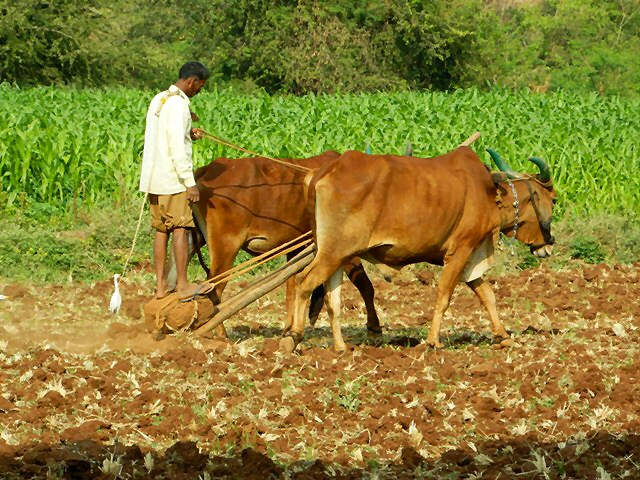
Traditional farming in Bidar with jola ("sorghum") in the background

Agriculture is the main occupation in rural parts of the district. Greengram, bengalgram, blackgram, paddy, groundnut, wheat, redgram, sugarcane and chillies are other agricultural crops.

Agriculture in Bidar had its own specific form. Drawing on the specification of the local ecology, agriculture was mostly dry cultivation or rain-dependent cultivation in which a wide variety of local sorghum (jola, the staple grain) was grown in combination with pulses, oil seeds, wheat and other cereals. Though cultivation was restricted to two periods, rabi or "winter cultivation" (August–January), and kharif or "summer cultivation" (June–September), care was taken to cultivate green manure crops of sann hemp and diancha. The cultivation and use of such manure crops helped agriculturists retain the fertility of the soil, decreased the chances of external pests and diseases entering the fields, and enabled agriculturists to be self-reliant for a very significant agricultural input. Even by the 1970s little commercial or inorganic manure and fertilisers were used.

However, the agriculture of Bidar, like that of many other semi-arid regions which produced dry cereals, was considered to be "low productive" and has been subject to a variety of "development programmes" that have drawn, largely, on the agenda of the Green Revolution. Drawing on programmes and policies that emphasise the need to increase agricultural productivity, the state has promoted a model of agriculture in the region that draws primarily on the model of agriculture developed for wet regions and for commercial cultivation.

In 1966–67, high-yielding varieties of seeds for sorghum, paddy, wheat and sugarcane were introduced. Gradually between the late 1960s and mid-1970s hybrid varieties of seeds for other crops such as cotton, pulses and sunflower were introduced. The cultivation of tur or toghri (red gram) as a commercial crop became the primary agricultural agenda in the region, A significant proportion of land once under multi-crops and dry cultivation (especially sorghum, wheat and oil-seeds) has now been dedicated to the cultivation of pulses, especially that of kadle (Bengal gram) and tur.

The introduction and promotion of modern agriculture resulted in the development of two key and striking contradictions in the region. Perhaps the most significant contradiction of this is that while there is an alteration in the very foundations and orientations of agricultural cultivation (in the type of crops cultivated, in the new seed varieties, new inputs, etc.), there is little or no change in the social bases of the agrarian society. That is, though there is an alteration in the physical conduct of agriculture (in the types of crops grown, the cultivation patterns etc.), it is not matched by any alteration in the ownership patterns of the agrarian society in which the new agriculture is introduced. Though it is largely a dry cultivation belt with a predominance of small cultivators, there is a schism in the patterns of land ownership.

Given the declining size of landholdings, many small and marginal cultivators resort to renting or sharecropping.

- Social scenario - The introduction of commercial agriculture in this predominantly dry agriculture belt has its impact on the social fabric of the region. Commercial agriculture itself forces agriculturists to submit to the prescriptions of the agricultural extension service, the market, the agri-business agencies and credit institutions and agents. Agriculture is no longer drawn on the established principles of local knowledge and caste and kin-based ties. Instead, agriculture is a form of livelihood, to engage in which individual agriculturists (farmers) depend primarily on their household and family support. As agriculture becomes an externally prescribed form of economic activity there are problems in the dissemination of knowledge, in the conduct of actual agricultural activities and in the understanding and management of situations such as crop loss.

==== Irrigation ====
In geo-physical terms Bidar district is part of the semi-arid and drought-prone belt of northern Karnataka and has been susceptible to periodic droughts. Though some 82 percent of the total land are cultivated, only eight (8) percent of its total cultivable area is irrigated.

The two major irrigation projects, Karanja, which started in 1963, and Chulkinala, which started in 1972, are yet to be completed. Only 2,097 hectares (8.10 sq mi) are irrigated by canals and tanks, while the rest, of about 30,892 hectares (119.27 sq mi), are irrigated by wells and tube wells. The state of incompletion and disrepair (of the little that has been completed) of the two large irrigation projects are reflect the extent of state support for the region.

== Government ==
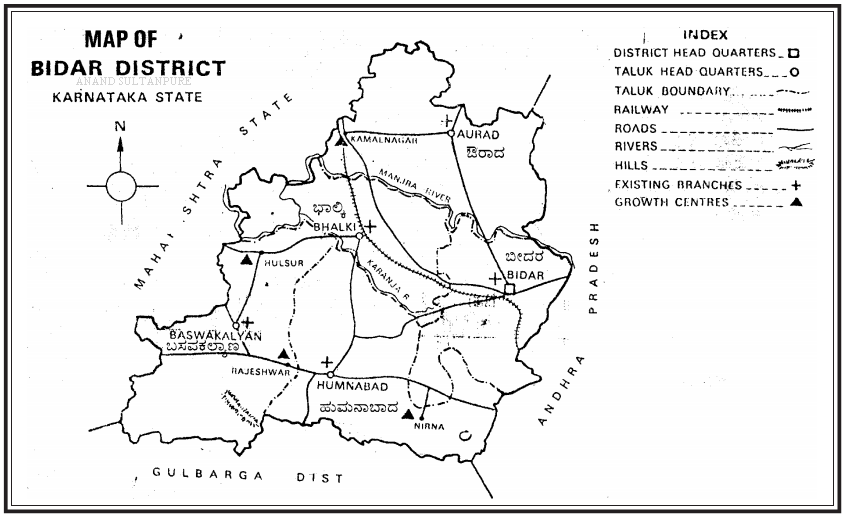
Bidar District map

=== Administration ===
The district has eight talukas, Bidar, Humnabad, Bhalki, Aurad, Hulsoor, Chitgoppa, Kamalnagar and Basavakalyan. In the Lok Sabha, the district is represented by Bidar constituency. The MP for Bidar is Sagar Khandre from the Indian National Congress.

=== Legislative Assembly seats ===
In the Karnataka Legislative Assembly, Bidar district is represented through six members elected from the following assembly segments:

No.	Constituency	Name	Party
47	Basavakalyan	Sharanu Salagar	BJP
48	Humnabad	Siddu Patil	BJP
49	Bidar South	Shailendra Bedale	BJP
50	Bidar	Rahim Khan	INC
51	Bhalki	Eshwara Khandre	INC
52	Aurad (SC)	Prabhu Chauhan	BJP
