= 1999 Karnataka Legislative Assembly election =

- 5 and 11 September 1999

All 224 Legislative Assembly seats 113 seats needed for a majority
- Turnout: 67.65 pp (▼0.94 pp)
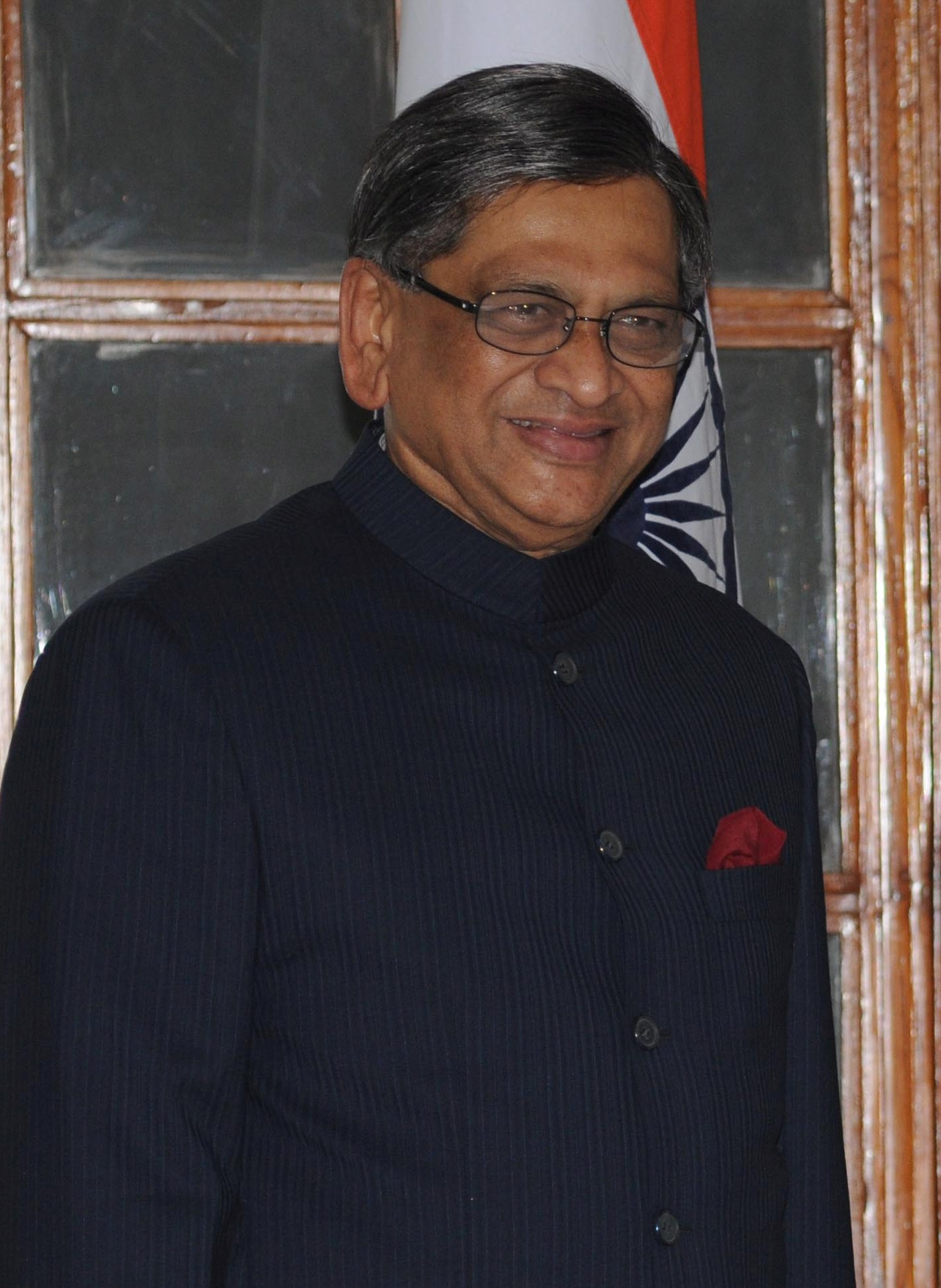

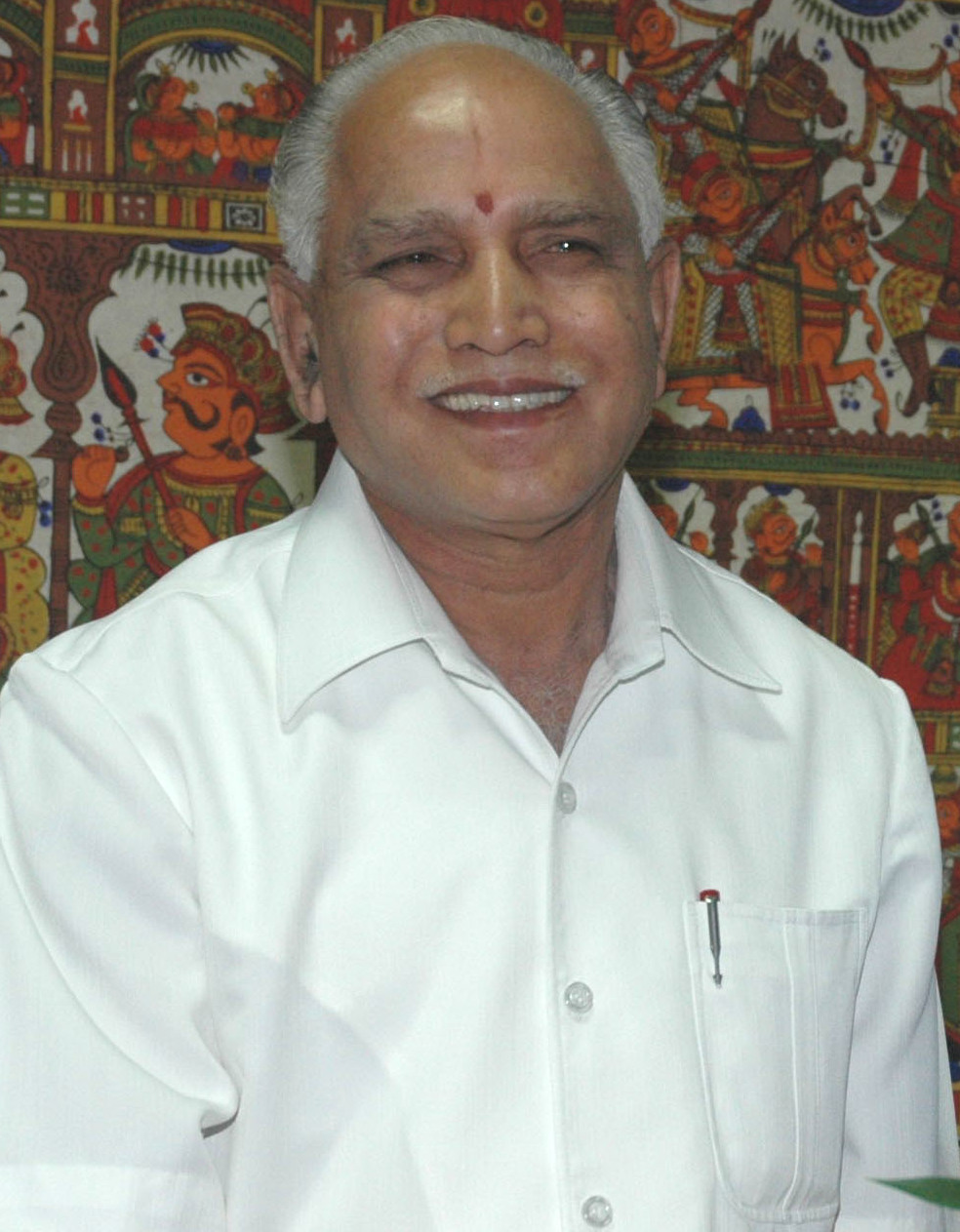

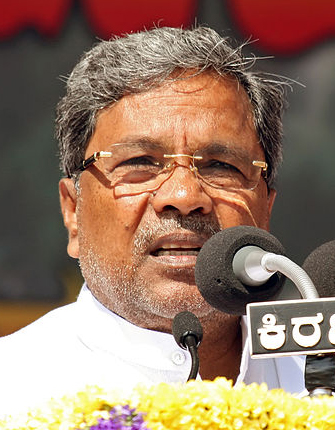
	Majority party	Minority party
Leader	S. M. Krishna	B. S. Yeddyurappa
Party	INC	BJP
Alliance	-	NDA
Leader since	1999	1984
Leader's seat	Maddur (won)	Shikaripura (lost)
Last election	34	40
Seats won	132	44
Seat change	▲98	▲4
Popular vote	90,77,815	45,98,741
Percentage	40.84%	20.69%
Swing	▲13.89 pp	▲3.70 pp
	Third party	Fourth party
	JD(U)
Leader	J. H. Patel	Siddaramaiah
Party	JD(U)	JD(S)
Alliance	NDA	-
Leader since	1996	1999
Leader's seat	Channagiri (Lost)	Chamundeshwari (lost)
Last election	Party did not exist	Party did not exist
Seats won	18	10
Seat change	▲18	▲10
Popular vote	30,06,253	23,16,885
Percentage	13.53%	10.42%
Swing	▲13.53 pp	▲10.42 pp
- Map of Karnataka Legislative Assembly after the election
Chief Minister before election
J. H. Patel
JD(U)
Elected Chief Minister
S. M. Krishna
INC

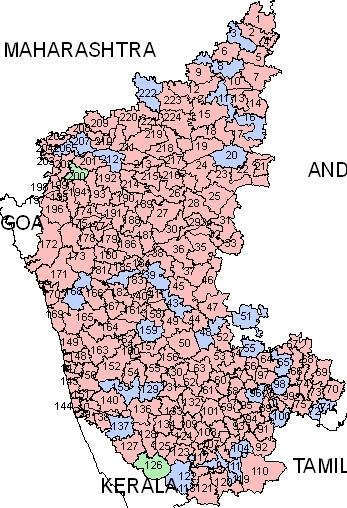
Karnataka Legislative Assembly constituencies (1978–2008)

The 1999 Karnataka Legislative Assembly election took place in two phases for 224 constituencies in Karnataka, India. The elections were conducted to elect the government in the state of Karnataka for the next five years.

The Indian National Congress secured a huge majority, winning 132 seats. The National Democratic Alliance, composed of the Bharatiya Janata Party (BJP) and Janata Dal (United) faction, was a distant second, winning only 63 seats. The Janata Dal (Secular) (JD(S)) faction of former prime minister Deve Gowda also bit dust, winning only 10 seats. The election was held simultaneously with the Lok Sabha elections. The Janata Dal (JD) government collapsed in mid-1999 owing to a split in the party. Chief Minister J. H. Patel, party president C. Byre Gowda and many other prominent leaders were part of the Janata Dal (United) faction, and along with Ramakrishna Hegde, allied with the BJP, whereas Deve Gowda and his associates including the deputy chief minister Siddaramaiah joined the JD(S) faction. Owing to the anti-incumbency against both the factions of the JD, Congress won handsomely. S. M. Krishna of the Congress was sworn in as chief minister on 11 October 1999.

== Election schedule ==
The polling schedule for the 1999 general elections and assembly elections was announced by the chief election commissioner on 11 July 1999.

Poll event	Phase	
Poll event	I	II
Notification date	11 August 1999	17 August 1999
Last date for filing nomination	18 August 1999	24 August 1999
Scrutiny of nomination	19 August 1999	25 August 1999
Last Date for withdrawal of nomination	21 August 1999	27 August 1999
Date of poll	5 September 1999	11 September 1999
Date of counting of votes/result	6 October 1999	
No. of constituencies	120	104

== Parties and alliances ==
=== Bharatiya Janata Party ===
No.	Party	Flag	Symbol	Leader	Seats contested
1.	Bharatiya Janata Party			B. S. Yeddyurappa	222

=== Indian National Congress ===
No.	Party	Flag	Symbol	Leader	Seats contested
1.	Indian National Congress			S. M. Krishna	222

=== Janata Dal (Secular) ===
No.	Party	Flag	Symbol	Leader	Seats contested
1.	Janata Dal (Secular) (Note: This symbol was used by JD(S) until 2001.)			H. D. Deve Gowda	203

=== Janata Dal (United) ===
No.	Party	Flag	Symbol	Leader	Seats contested
1.	Janata Dal (United)			J. H. Patel	112

== Results ==
=== Party-wise ===
Parties	Popular vote			Seats		
Parties	Votes	%	+pp	Contested	Won	+/-
Indian National Congress	90,77,815	40.84	▲13.89	222	132	▲98
Bharatiya Janata Party	45,98,741	20.69	▲3.70	149	44	▲4
Janata Dal (United)	30,06,253	13.53	▲13.53	112	18	▲18
Janata Dal (Secular)	23,16,885	10.42	▲10.42	203	10	▲10
Independent	26,66,444	12.00	▲2.34	476	19	▲1
Others	5,59,361	2.52	▼10.34	179	1	▼16
Total	2,22,25,499	100.00		1,341	224	±0
Valid votes	2,22,25,499	95.88				
Invalid votes	9,56,294	4.12				
Votes cast / turnout	2,31,94,283	67.65				
Abstentions	1,10,89,815	32.35				
Registered voters	3,42,84,098					

=== Results by district ===
District	Seats						
District	Seats	INC	BJP	JDU	JDS	IND	OTH
Bidar	6	—N/a	5	—N/a	1	—N/a	—N/a
Kalaburagi	13	10	1	—N/a	2	—N/a	—N/a
Raichur	6	4	—N/a	2	—N/a	—N/a	—N/a
Koppal	5	4	—N/a	1	—N/a	—N/a	—N/a
Ballari	8	8	—N/a	—N/a	—N/a	—N/a	—N/a
Davanagere	7	3	1	—N/a	—N/a	3	—N/a
Chitradurga	7	2	2	1	—N/a	2	—N/a
Tumakuru	13	8	2	—N/a	3	—N/a	—N/a
Kolar	10	4	—N/a	2	—N/a	4	—N/a
Bengaluru Urban	16	8	7	—N/a	—N/a	—N/a	1
Bengaluru Rural	9	5	1	2	—N/a	1	—N/a
Mandya	8	5	—N/a	1	1	1	—N/a
Chamarajanagara	6	3	1	2	—N/a	—N/a	—N/a
Mysuru	16	8	8	—N/a	—N/a	—N/a	—N/a
Kodagu	3	2	1	—N/a	—N/a	—N/a	—N/a
Hassan	8	4	4	—N/a	—N/a	—N/a	—N/a
Dakshina Kannada	9	5	4	—N/a	—N/a	—N/a	—N/a
Udupi	6	4	1	—N/a	—N/a	1	—N/a
Chikkamagaluru	6	4	—N/a	1	1	—N/a	—N/a
Shivamogga	7	5	1	—N/a	—N/a	1	—N/a
Total	224	132	44	18	10	19	1

=== Results by constituency ===
District	Constituency		Winner				Runner-up				Margin
District	No.	Name	Candidate	Party	Votes	%	Candidate	Party	Votes	%	Margin
Bidar	1	Aurad	Gundappa Vakil	BJP	31,967	32.95	Gurupadappa Nagamarapalli	INC	29,182	30.07	2,785
Bidar	2	Bhalki	Prakash Khandre	BJP	47,132	54.91	Vijaykumar Khandre	INC	36,805	42.88	10,327
Bidar	3	Hulsoor	Rajendra Verma	BJP	32,189	44.70	Shivaraj Hasankar	INC	19,732	27.40	12,457
Bidar	4	Bidar	Rameshkumar Pande	BJP	44,270	33.80	Bandeppa Kashempur	INC	42,180	32.20	2,090
Bidar	5	Humnabad	Subhas Kallur	BJP	35,438	36.44	Rajashekar Patil	INC	31,868	32.77	3,570
Bidar	6	Basavakalyan	M. G. Mule	JD(S)	48,166	50.61	Basavaraj Patil Attur	JD(U)	29,002	30.48	19,164
Gulbarga	7	Chincholi	Kailashnath Patil	INC	42,814	52.38	Vaijnath Patil	JD(S)	16,551	20.25	26,263
Gulbarga	8	Kamalapur	Revu Naik Belamgi	BJP	27,531	39.66	G. Ramkrishna	INC	18,981	27.35	8,550
Gulbarga	9	Aland	Subhash Guttedar	JD(S)	29,762	38.89	B. R. Patil	JD(U)	27,451	35.87	2,311
Gulbarga	10	Gulbarga	Qamar ul Islam	INC	79,225	48.84	Chandrashekhar Revoor	BJP	67,446	41.58	11,779
Gulbarga	11	Shahabad	Baburao Chavhan	INC	38,072	41.43	Valmik Naik	BJP	30,206	32.87	7,866
Gulbarga	12	Afzalpur	Malikayya Guttedar	JD(S)	32,896	38.16	M. Y. Patil	INC	31,061	36.03	1,835
Gulbarga	13	Chittapur	Baburao Chinchansur	INC	39,919	52.65	Vishwanath Hebbal	JD(U)	31,863	42.02	8,056
Gulbarga	14	Sedam	Basavanath Mothakpalli	INC	44,210	54.48	Chandrashekar Deshmukh	JD(U)	20,526	25.29	23,684
Gulbarga	15	Jevargi	Dharam Singh	INC	37,510	43.17	Shivalingappa Naribole	BJP	35,549	40.91	1,961
Gulbarga	16	Gurmitkal	Mallikarjun Kharge	INC	54,569	76.76	Ashok Guruji	JD(U)	7,445	10.47	47,124
Gulbarga	17	Yadgir	A. B. Malakareddy	INC	33,242	44.76	Veera Reddy	JD(U)	22,380	30.13	10,862
Gulbarga	18	Shahapur	Shivashekharappa Sirwal	INC	47,963	50.90	Sharanabasappa Darshanapur	JD(U)	40,339	42.80	7,624
Gulbarga	19	Shorapur	Raja Venkatappa Naik	INC	45,351	46.35	Shivanna Mangihal	Ind	24,901	25.45	20,450
Raichur	20	Devadurga	Yallappa Akkaraki	INC	39,973	57.76	Shivalinga Swami	JD(U)	14,602	21.10	25,371
Raichur	21	Raichur	Syed Yasin	INC	35,484	38.27	Ahuja Reddy	BJP	29,928	32.28	5,556
Raichur	22	Kalmala	Raja Amareshwara Naik	INC	27,691	34.06	Shankar Haravi	BJP	26,077	32.08	1,614
Raichur	23	Manvi	N. S. Boseraju	INC	43,400	51.16	Basanagouda Byagawat	BJP	24,890	29.34	18,510
Raichur	24	Lingsugur	Amaregouda Bayyapur	JD(U)	31,684	35.95	Basawaraj Anwari	INC	28,626	32.48	3,058
Raichur	25	Sindhanur	Hampanagouda Badarli	JD(U)	64,853	51.10	K. Virupaxappa	INC	59,367	46.78	5,486
Koppal	26	Kushtagi	Hasanasab Dotihal	INC	41,200	47.23	K. Sharanappa	JD(S)	25,256	28.95	15,944
Koppal	27	Yelburga	Shivasharanappa Patil	INC	28,706	34.98	Halappa Achar	JD(U)	24,993	30.45	3,713
Koppal	28	Kanakagiri	M. Malikarjun Nagappa	INC	55,808	59.40	Nagappa Saloni	JD(U)	32,601	34.70	23,207
Koppal	29	Gangawati	Srirangadevarayalu	INC	45,853	50.07	H. Gire Gouda	BJP	28,291	30.89	17,562
Koppal	30	Koppal	Karadi Sanganna Amarappa	JD(U)	46,441	48.43	K. Rajashekar Basavaraj Hitnal	JD(S)	25,812	26.92	20,629
Bellary	31	Siruguppa	M. Shankar Reddy	INC	51,742	46.31	T. M. Chandrashekhariah	JD(U)	28,843	25.81	22,899
Bellary	32	Kurugodu	Allum Veerabhadrappa	INC	47,395	45.75	N. Suryanarayana Reddy	BJP	42,987	41.50	4,408
Bellary	33	Bellary	M. Divakar Babu	INC	55,441	52.74	B. Sriramulu	BJP	46,508	44.24	8,933
Bellary	34	Hospet	Jayalakshmi Gujjal	INC	47,220	50.24	G. Shankargoud	BJP	36,015	38.32	11,205
Bellary	35	Sandur	M. Y. Ghorpade	INC	47,681	53.05	Heeroji Lad	JD(U)	38,688	43.05	8,993
Bellary	36	Kudligi	Siraj Shaik	INC	39,825	41.66	N. T. Bommanna	BJP	21,732	22.74	18,093
Bellary	37	Kottur	T. Bhagirathi Gouda	INC	49,366	51.81	M. M. J. Swaroopananda	JD(U)	39,732	41.70	9,634
Bellary	38	Hoovina Hadagali	V. B. Halappa	INC	51,434	50.56	M. P. Prakash	JD(U)	48,344	47.53	3,090
Davanagere	39	Harapanahalli	P. T. Parameshwar Naik	INC	30,316	33.96	B. H. Yanka Naik	Ind	19,779	22.16	10,537
Davanagere	40	Harihar	Y. Nagappa	INC	57,406	50.25	H. Shivappa	JD(U)	54,967	48.11	2,439
Davanagere	41	Davanagere	S. S. Mallikarjun	INC	54,401	48.47	Yashavantha Rao	BJP	50,108	44.65	4,293
Davanagere	42	Mayakonda	S. A. Ravindranath	BJP	46,917	41.79	K. R. Jayadevappa	INC	32,720	29.14	14,197
Chitradurga	43	Bharamasagara	M. Chandrappa	JD(U)	37,194	39.86	H. Anjaneya	INC	28,240	30.26	8,954
Chitradurga	44	Chitradurga	G. H. Thippareddy	Ind	51,198	48.96	H. Ekanthaiah	Ind	24,782	23.70	26,416
Davanagere	45	Jagalur	G. H. Ashwath Reddy	Ind	48,865	51.46	M. Basappa	INC	25,097	26.43	23,768
Chitradurga	46	Molakalmuru	N. Y. Gopalakrishna	INC	44,296	44.66	G. M. Thippeswamy	JD(U)	30,115	30.37	14,181
Chitradurga	47	Challakere	G. Basavaraj Mandimutt	BJP	26,517	25.85	Thippeswamy	JD(S)	17,665	17.22	8,852
Chitradurga	48	Hiriyur	K. H. Ranganath	INC	45,415	47.98	D. Manjunath	JD(S)	35,755	37.78	9,660
Chitradurga	49	Holalkere	P. Ramesh	BJP	50,121	48.44	A. V. Umapathi	Ind	48,666	47.03	1,455
Chitradurga	50	Hosadurga	B. G. Govindappa	Ind	26,372	24.09	Elkal Vijayakumar	Ind	25,145	22.97	1,227
Tumkur	51	Pavagada	Venkataramanappa	INC	65,999	53.42	Somlanaika	JD(U)	44,897	36.34	21,102
Tumkur	52	Sira	P. M. Ranganath	INC	42,263	43.68	B. Satyanarayana	JD(S)	16,609	17.16	25,654
Tumkur	53	Kallambella	T. B. Jayachandra	INC	44,480	47.96	K. S. Kiran Kumar	BJP	37,365	40.29	7,115
Tumkur	54	Bellavi	R. Narayana	INC	43,803	46.60	V. N. Murthy	BJP	19,707	20.96	24,096
Tumkur	55	Madhugiri	G. Parameshwara	INC	71,895	68.27	Gangahanumaiah	JD(S)	16,093	15.28	55,802
Tumkur	56	Koratagere	C. Channigappa	JD(S)	33,558	31.71	C. Veerabhadraiah	INC	32,852	31.04	706
Tumkur	57	Tumkur	Sogadu Shivanna	BJP	60,699	46.95	S. Shafi Ahmed	INC	52,111	40.31	8,588
Tumkur	58	Kunigal	S. P. Muddahanumegowda	INC	45,659	47.40	H. Ningappa	JD(S)	42,078	43.68	3,581
Tumkur	59	Huliyurdurga	Y. K. Ramaiah	INC	47,824	59.85	D. Nagarajaiah	JD(S)	26,259	32.86	21,565
Tumkur	60	Gubbi	N. Veeranna Gowda	JD(S)	39,272	41.92	G. S. Shivananjappa	INC	35,217	37.59	4,055
Tumkur	61	Turuvekere	M. D. Lakshminarayana	BJP	38,122	40.46	M. T. Krishnappa	Ind	22,790	24.19	15,332
Tumkur	62	Tiptur	K. Shadakshari	INC	46,489	49.28	B. Nanjamari	BJP	43,742	46.37	2,747
Tumkur	63	Chikkanayakanahalli	C. B. Suresh Babu	JD(S)	43,961	49.33	J. C. Madhu Swamy	JD(U)	29,018	32.56	14,943
Kolar	64	Gauribidanur	N. H. Shivashankara Reddy	Ind	34,541	33.08	Aswatha Reddy	INC	33,679	32.26	862
Kolar	65	Chikballapur	Anasuyamma Natarajan	INC	39,460	40.27	M. Shivananda	JD(U)	26,132	26.67	13,328
Kolar	66	Sidlaghatta	B. Muniyappa	INC	60,514	54.64	S. Munishamappa	JD(U)	48,049	43.38	12,465
Kolar	67	Bagepalli	N. Sampangi	Ind	40,183	38.04	G. V. Sreerama Reddy	CPI(M)	36,885	34.92	3,298
Kolar	68	Chintamani	Chowda Reddy	Ind	58,977	51.40	K. M. Krishna Reddy	JD(U)	43,315	37.75	15,662
Kolar	69	Srinivasapur	G. K. Venkatashiva Reddy	INC	52,490	49.42	Ramesh Kumar	Ind	51,297	48.30	1,193
Kolar	70	Mulbagal	M. V. Venkatappa	INC	39,722	35.11	R. Srinivasan	JD(S)	27,826	24.59	11,896
Kolar	71	Kolar Gold Field	M. Backthavachalam	AIADMK	22,255	36.76	K. Thinagaran	BJP	18,508	30.57	3,747
Kolar	72	Bethamangala	C. Venkateshappa	INC	75,844	68.93	M. Narayanaswamy	JD(U)	32,604	29.63	43,240
Kolar	73	Kolar	K. Srinivasa Gowda	JD(U)	59,017	54.92	Naseer Ahmed	INC	38,004	35.37	21,013
Kolar	74	Vemagal	C. Byre Gowda	JD(U)	56,449	51.05	V. Venkata Muniyappa	INC	48,892	44.21	7,557
Kolar	75	Malur	A. Nagaraju	INC	53,762	53.13	S. N. Ragunatha	Ind	34,474	34.07	19,288
Bangalore Urban	76	Malleshwaram	M. R. Seetharam	INC	39,864	47.66	M. Raghupathy	JD(U)	21,829	26.10	18,035
Bangalore Urban	77	Rajaji Nagar	S. Suresh Kumar	BJP	53,554	38.77	N. L. Narendra Babu	Ind	31,839	23.05	21,715
Bangalore Urban	78	Gandhi Nagar	Dinesh Gundu Rao	INC	15,634	25.32	V. Nagaraj	Ind	14,519	23.51	1,115
Bangalore Urban	79	Chickpet	P. C. Mohan	BJP	20,636	39.26	D. P. Sharma	INC	15,047	28.62	5,589
Bangalore Urban	80	Binnypet	V. Somanna	Ind	73,974	40.48	Ashwatha Narayana	BJP	49,736	27.22	24,238
Bangalore Urban	81	Chamrajpet	R. V. Devaraj	INC	30,179	54.12	Pramila Nesargi	BJP	19,636	35.21	10,543
Bangalore Urban	82	Basavanagudi	K. N. Subbareddy	BJP	41,430	48.44	K. M. Nagaraj	INC	26,086	30.50	15,344
Bangalore Urban	83	Jayanagar	Ramalinga Reddy	INC	67,604	48.38	B. N. Vijaya Kumar	BJP	53,673	38.41	13,931
Bangalore Urban	84	Shanti Nagar	M. Muniswamy	INC	35,751	45.89	S. Raghu	BJP	28,418	36.48	7,333
Bangalore Urban	85	Shivajinagar	Katta Subramanya Naidu	BJP	28,756	57.93	K. Govindaraj	INC	18,203	36.67	10,553
Bangalore Urban	86	Bharathinagar	J. Alexander	INC	23,466	36.56	Pradeep Reddy	JD(U)	13,067	20.36	10,399
Bangalore Urban	87	Jayamahal	R. Roshan Baig	INC	41,990	45.54	Jeevaraj Alva	JD(U)	36,070	39.12	5,920
Bangalore Urban	88	Yelahanka	B. Prasanna Kumar	INC	124,593	50.63	C. Muniyappa	BJP	85,108	34.58	39,485
Bangalore Urban	89	Uttarahalli	R. Ashoka	BJP	230,914	49.79	S. Ramesh	INC	207,009	44.64	23,905
Bangalore Urban	90	Varthur	A. Krishnappa	INC	109,076	51.13	Ashwathnarayana Reddy	JD(U)	82,975	38.89	26,101
Bangalore Rural	91	Kanakapura	P. G. R. Sindhia	JD(U)	48,164	48.36	Narayanagowda	JD(S)	24,436	24.53	23,728
Bangalore Rural	92	Sathanur	D. K. Shivakumar	INC	56,050	54.64	H. D. Kumaraswamy	JD(S)	41,663	40.61	14,387
Bangalore Rural	93	Channapatna	C. P. Yogeshwara	Ind	50,716	46.01	Sadath Khan	INC	31,888	28.93	18,828
Bangalore Rural	94	Ramanagara	C. M. Lingappa	INC	46,553	42.09	D. Girigowda	BJP	26,400	23.87	20,153
Bangalore Rural	95	Magadi	H. M. Revanna	INC	52,802	48.24	H. C. Balakrishna	BJP	47,707	43.59	5,095
Bangalore Rural	96	Nelamangala	Anjanamurthy	INC	64,682	65.11	M. Shankaranayak	JD(U)	30,925	31.13	33,757
Bangalore Rural	97	Doddaballapur	V. Krishnappa	BJP	62,096	55.25	R. G. Venkatachalaiah	INC	47,966	42.68	14,130
Bangalore Rural	98	Devanahalli	Muninarasimhaiah	INC	61,655	46.05	G. Chandranna	JD(S)	42,211	31.53	19,444
Bangalore Rural	99	Hosakote	B. N. Bachegowda	JD(U)	73,055	48.10	Munegowda	INC	65,752	43.29	7,303
Bangalore Urban	100	Anekal	A. Narayanaswamy	BJP	63,713	45.01	M. P. Keshavamurthy	INC	62,152	43.91	1,561
Mandya	101	Nagamangala	N. Chaluvaraya Swamy	JD(S)	55,643	54.01	L. R. Shivarame Gowda	INC	40,484	39.30	15,159
Mandya	102	Maddur	S. M. Krishna	INC	56,907	59.20	M. Maheshchand	JD(U)	27,448	28.55	29,459
Mandya	103	Kirugavalu	D. C. Thammanna	INC	44,523	44.59	K. N. Nagegowda	JD(U)	43,799	43.87	724
Mandya	104	Malavalli	B. Somashekar	JD(U)	27,335	29.43	P. M. Narendra Swamy	INC	22,054	23.75	5,281
Mandya	105	Mandya	M. S. Athmananda	INC	52,703	55.79	M. Srinivas	JD(U)	34,647	36.67	18,056
Mandya	106	Keragodu	H. D. Choudaiah	Ind	35,579	42.92	D. B. Ramu	INC	34,543	41.67	1,036
Mandya	107	Shrirangapattana	Parvathamma Srikantaiah	INC	47,866	47.43	K. S. Nanjundegowda	KRRS	25,273	25.04	22,593
Mandya	108	Pandavapura	K. Kempegowda	INC	41,661	38.30	K. S. Puttaramaih	KRRS	33,803	31.07	7,858
Mandya	109	Krishnarajpete	K. B. Chandrashekar	INC	45,683	43.28	B. L. Devaraju	JD(S)	28,802	27.28	16,881
Chamarajanagar	110	Hanur	G. Rajugowda	INC	62,314	56.26	H. Nagappa	JD(U)	46,102	41.62	16,212
Chamarajanagar	111	Kollegal	G. N. Nanjunda Swamy	INC	29,671	35.24	S. Balaraj	BJP	24,250	28.80	5,421
Mysore	112	Bannur	K. M. Chikkamada Naik	INC	45,706	48.98	S. Krishnappa	JD(S)	19,060	20.43	26,646
Mysore	113	T. Narasipur	Bharathi Shankar	BJP	28,858	34.30	H. C. Mahadevappa	JD(S)	21,372	25.40	7,486
Mysore	114	Krishnaraja	A. Ramadas	BJP	29,813	45.65	M. K. Somashekar	JD(S)	20,061	30.72	9,752
Mysore	115	Chamaraja	H. S. Shankaralinge Gowda	BJP	48,733	55.69	Vasu	INC	26,412	30.18	22,321
Mysore	116	Narasimharaja	Azeez Sait	INC	56,485	50.51	Maruthi Pawar	BJP	42,516	38.02	13,969
Mysore	117	Chamundeshwari	A. S. Guruswamy	INC	57,107	34.40	Siddaramaiah	JD(S)	50,907	30.66	6,200
Mysore	118	Nanjangud	M. Mahadev	INC	34,701	36.83	D. T. Jayakumar	JD(S)	26,703	28.34	7,998
Chamarajanagar	119	Santhemarahalli	A. R. Krishnamurthy	JD(U)	33,977	41.85	R. Dhruvananarayana	BJP	28,071	34.58	5,906
Chamarajanagar	120	Chamarajanagar	C. Guruswamy	BJP	46,300	43.83	Vatal Nagaraj	KCVP	28,781	27.24	17,519
Chamarajanagar	121	Gundlupet	H. S. Mahadeva Prasad	JD(U)	46,757	45.25	H. S. Nanjappa	INC	21,776	21.07	24,981
Mysore	122	Heggadadevankote	M. Shivanna	INC	45,136	39.59	M. P. Venkatesh	Ind	29,268	25.67	15,868
Mysore	123	Hunasuru	V. Papanna	BJP	35,046	28.61	Chikkamadu S.	Ind	32,256	26.33	2,790
Mysore	124	Krishnarajanagara	H. Vishwanatha	INC	58,161	53.92	Mahadeva	JD(S)	25,168	23.33	32,993
Mysore	125	Periyapatna	H. C. Basavaraju	BJP	43,399	34.91	K. S. Kalamarigowda	INC	40,320	32.43	3,079
Kodagu	126	Virajpet	Suma Vasantha	INC	29,136	48.96	M. D. Basavaraju	BJP	24,867	41.79	4,269
Kodagu	127	Madikeri	M. Nanaiah Mundanda	INC	26,052	34.55	S. Madappa Dambekodi	Ind	21,432	28.42	4,620
Kodagu	128	Somwarpet	Appachu Ranjan	BJP	35,768	39.08	Jeevijaya	Ind	32,195	35.17	3,573
Hassan	129	Belur	Sh. Puttaranganath	BJP	32,770	37.88	D. Mallesh	INC	31,724	36.67	1,046
Hassan	130	Arsikere	G. V. Siddappa	INC	43,224	42.95	A. S. Basavaraju	BJP	32,235	32.03	10,989
Hassan	131	Gandasi	B. Shivaramu	INC	62,530	62.36	Rajeshakarappa	JD(S)	21,455	21.40	41,075
Hassan	132	Shravanabelagola	H. C. Srikantaiah	INC	65,624	51.05	C. S. Putte Gowda	JD(S)	42,576	33.12	23,048
Hassan	133	Holenarasipur	A. Doddegowda	INC	67,151	57.51	H. D. Revanna	JD(S)	44,964	38.51	22,187
Hassan	134	Arkalgud	A. Manju	BJP	53,732	53.07	A. T. Ramaswamy	INC	38,187	37.71	15,545
Hassan	135	Hassan	K. H. Hanumegowda	BJP	40,378	34.06	K. M. Rajegowda	INC	34,774	29.33	5,604
Hassan	136	Sakleshpur	B. B. Shivappa	BJP	31,702	30.82	B. R. Gurudev	INC	30,358	29.51	1,344
Dakshina Kannada	137	Sullia	S. Angara	BJP	54,814	52.51	K. Kushala	INC	47,817	45.80	6,997
Dakshina Kannada	138	Puttur	D. V. Sadananda Gowda	BJP	62,306	52.94	N. Sudhakar Shetty	INC	55,013	46.74	7,293
Dakshina Kannada	139	Vittal	K. M. Ibrahim	INC	54,268	50.17	A. Rukmaya Poojari	BJP	52,093	48.16	2,175
Dakshina Kannada	140	Belthangady	K. Prabhakara Bangera	BJP	45,042	41.46	K. Gangadharagowda	INC	39,781	36.62	5,261
Dakshina Kannada	141	Bantval	B. Ramanath Rai	INC	49,905	56.96	Shakunthala T. Shetty	BJP	36,084	41.18	13,821
Dakshina Kannada	142	Mangalore	N. Yogish Bhat	BJP	34,628	54.77	Blasius D'Souza	INC	28,116	44.47	6,512
Dakshina Kannada	143	Ullal	U. T. Fareed	INC	50,134	53.82	K. Jayarama Shetty	BJP	34,881	37.44	15,253
Dakshina Kannada	144	Surathkal	Vijaya Shetty	INC	53,749	52.67	Kumble Sundararao	BJP	46,760	45.82	6,989
Udupi	145	Kapu	Vasanth V. Salian	INC	31,151	47.49	Lalaji R. Mendon	BJP	27,653	42.16	3,498
Udupi	146	Udupi	U. R. Sabhapathi	INC	41,018	49.01	B. Sudhakar Shetty	BJP	40,308	48.16	710
Udupi	147	Brahmavar	K. Jayaprakash Hegde	Ind	32,429	38.12	Sarala Kanchan	INC	27,666	32.52	4,763
Udupi	148	Kundapura	Halady Srinivas Shetty	BJP	48,051	50.13	K. Prathapachandra Shetty	INC	47,030	49.06	1,021
Udupi	149	Byndoor	K. Gopala Poojary	INC	46,075	52.78	K. Laxminarayana	BJP	40,693	46.62	5,382
Udupi	150	Karkala	H. Gopala Bhandary	INC	49,591	62.68	K. P. Shenoy	BJP	28,857	36.47	20,734
Dakshina Kannada	151	Moodabidri	Abhayachandra Jain	INC	35,588	50.84	K. Amarnath Shetty	JD(U)	31,398	44.86	4,190
Chikmagalur	152	Sringeri	D. B. Chandregowda	INC	46,579	51.07	D. N. Jeevaraj	BJP	42,008	46.05	4,571
Chikmagalur	153	Mudigere	Motamma	INC	40,574	51.80	M. P. Kumaraswamy	BJP	24,258	30.97	16,316
Chikmagalur	154	Chikmagalur	C. R. Sageer Ahmed	INC	25,707	30.86	C. T. Ravi	BJP	24,725	29.68	982
Chikmagalur	155	Birur	K. B. Mallikarjuna	JD(U)	29,864	37.29	S. R. Laxmaiah	JD(S)	24,879	31.07	4,985
Chikmagalur	156	Kadur	K. M. Krishna Murthy	JD(S)	31,240	35.68	M. Marulasiddappa	Ind	26,435	30.19	4,805
Chikmagalur	157	Tarikere	B. R. Neelakantappa	INC	47,825	48.42	S. M. Nagaraju	JD(U)	25,390	25.70	22,435
Davanagere	158	Channagiri	Vadanal Rajanna	Ind	48,778	49.73	Mohibulla Khan	INC	22,239	22.67	26,539
Shimoga	159	Holehonnur	Kariyanna	INC	44,512	46.12	Basavannappa	JD(U)	29,123	30.17	15,389
Shimoga	160	Bhadravati	M. J. Appaji	Ind	43,923	44.33	B. K. Sangameshwara	INC	36,537	36.88	7,386
Davanagere	161	Honnali	D. G. Shantana Gowda	Ind	56,149	52.24	H. B. Krishnamurthy	INC	27,156	25.27	28,993
Shimoga	162	Shimoga	H. M. Chandrashekarappa	INC	59,490	49.97	K. S. Eshwarappa	BJP	52,916	44.45	6,574
Shimoga	163	Tirthahalli	Araga Jnanendra	BJP	33,778	37.89	Kimmane Rathnakar	JD(S)	29,676	33.29	4,102
Shimoga	164	Hosanagar	G. D. Narayanappa	INC	49,535	45.83	G. Nanjundappa	JD(U)	38,204	35.35	11,331
Shimoga	165	Sagar	Kagodu Thimmappa	INC	50,797	53.07	L. T. Thimmappa Hegde	BJP	32,730	34.20	18,067
Shimoga	166	Soraba	Kumar Bangarappa	INC	38,773	43.93	K. B. Prakash	Ind	26,278	29.77	12,495
Shimoga	167	Shikaripura	Mahalingappa	INC	55,852	52.48	B. S. Yediyurappa	BJP	48,291	45.38	7,561
Uttara Kannada	168	Sirsi	Vivekananda Vaidya	BJP	42,813	44.37	Gopal Kanade	INC	30,301	31.40	12,512
Uttara Kannada	169	Bhatkal	J. D. Naik	INC	42,004	47.02	Shivananda Naik	BJP	39,567	44.29	2,437
Uttara Kannada	170	Kumta	Mohan Shetty	INC	45,315	51.20	M. P. Karki	BJP	32,940	37.22	12,375
Uttara Kannada	171	Ankola	Vishweshwar Hegde Kageri	BJP	41,500	50.61	Umesh Bhat Bhavikeri	INC	33,259	40.56	8,241
Uttara Kannada	172	Karwar	Vasanth Asnotikar	INC	42,502	57.24	Prabhakar Rane	BJP	28,546	38.44	13,956
Uttara Kannada	173	Haliyal	R. V. Deshpande	INC	63,207	54.58	S. K. Gouda	JD(U)	49,483	42.73	13,724
Dharwad	174	Dharwad Rural	Shivanand Ambadagatti	Ind	30,375	34.88	Shivanand Holehadagali	BJP	27,473	31.54	2,902
Dharwad	175	Dharwad	Chandrakant Bellad	BJP	47,638	47.17	S. R. Morey	INC	46,650	46.19	988
Dharwad	176	Hubli City	Jabarkhan Khan	INC	34,019	40.79	Ashok Katwe	BJP	32,270	38.69	1,749
Dharwad	177	Hubli Rural	Jagadish Shettar	BJP	62,691	53.50	Gopinath Rangaswamy	INC	37,437	31.95	25,254
Dharwad	178	Kalghatgi	Siddanagouda Chikkanagoudra	BJP	32,977	36.08	Babusab Kashimanavar	Ind	29,265	32.02	3,712
Dharwad	179	Kundgol	C. S. Shivalli	Ind	30,692	35.26	Akkimallikarjun Sahadevappa	JD(U)	20,184	23.19	10,508
Haveri	180	Shiggaon	Syed Azeempeer Khadri	JD(S)	28,725	29.60	Shankaragouda Patil	BJP	27,084	27.91	1,641
Haveri	181	Hangal	Manohar Tahasildar	INC	59,628	55.42	C. M. Udasi	JD(U)	44,370	41.24	15,258
Haveri	182	Hirekerur	B. H. Rannikod	Ind	34,160	35.48	U. B. Banakar	BJP	30,232	31.40	3,928
Haveri	183	Ranibennur	Krishnappa Koliwadi	INC	50,958	50.23	Shivanna Tilavalli	JD(U)	45,460	44.81	5,498
Haveri	184	Byadgi	Rudrappa Lamani	INC	37,712	44.95	Neharu Olekar	Ind	19,976	23.81	17,736
Haveri	185	Haveri	Basavaraj Shivannavar	JD(S)	35,399	35.82	Chittaranjan Kalkoti	Ind	32,704	33.09	2,695
Gadag	186	Shirahatti	Geddayya Gaddadevarmath	INC	34,547	42.85	Ganganna Malleshappa	JD(U)	12,659	15.70	21,888
Gadag	187	Mundargi	Shidlinganagouda Patil	JD(U)	41,032	49.85	Vasappa Kuradagi	INC	39,188	47.61	1,844
Gadag	188	Gadag	D. R. Patil	INC	53,425	58.76	Channaveerayya Muttinpendimath	JD(U)	32,794	36.07	20,631
Gadag	189	Ron	Gurupadagouda Patil	INC	47,957	56.90	Shrishailappa Virupaxappa	JD(S)	18,802	22.31	29,155
Gadag	190	Nargund	B. R. Yavagal	INC	34,870	51.87	C. C. Patil	JD(S)	23,734	35.31	11,136
Dharwad	191	Navalgund	Kallappa Gaddi	INC	20,396	26.64	Siriyannavar	BJP	13,761	17.97	6,635
Belagavi	192	Ramdurg	N. V. Patil	INC	33,779	37.93	Mahadevappa Yadawad	JD(U)	31,485	35.35	2,294
Belagavi	193	Parasgad	Subhash Koujalgi	Ind	39,846	39.31	Chandrashekhar Mamani	Ind	22,239	21.94	17,607
Belagavi	194	Bailhongal	Mahantesh Koujalgi	JD(U)	25,856	30.55	Shanmukhappa Sidnal	INC	20,309	24.00	5,547
Belagavi	195	Kittur	D. B. Inamdar	INC	53,051	54.20	Viraktayya Salimath	BJP	41,321	42.21	11,730
Belagavi	196	Khanapur	Ashok Patil	Ind	36,930	40.30	Narayan Desai	Ind	20,419	22.28	16,511
Belagavi	197	Belagavi City	Ramesh Kudachi	INC	37,664	40.93	Malojirao Ashtekar	Ind	30,004	32.61	7,660
Belagavi	198	Uchagaon	Manohar Kadolkar	BJP	33,990	34.11	Basavant Patil	Ind	32,086	32.20	1,904
Belagavi	199	Hire Bagewadi	Shivaputrappa Malagi	JD(U)	24,439	24.35	Yallojirao Pingat	Ind	24,166	24.08	273
Belagavi	200	Gokak	Ramesh Jarkiholi	INC	72,888	72.60	Chandrashekhar Naik	JD(U)	15,932	15.87	56,956
Belagavi	201	Arabhavi	Veeranna Koujalgi	INC	51,094	47.52	Tammanna Parsi	BJP	32,844	30.54	18,250
Belagavi	202	Hukkeri	Umesh Katti	JD(U)	49,699	54.55	D. T. Patil	INC	39,717	43.60	9,982
Belagavi	203	Sankeshwar	Basagouda Patil	JD(U)	58,699	66.26	Malhargouda Patil	INC	27,650	31.21	31,049
Belagavi	204	Nippani	Kakasaheb Patil	INC	48,270	54.72	Subhash Joshi	JD(U)	37,721	42.76	10,549
Belagavi	205	Sadalga	Prakash Hukkeri	INC	57,394	59.83	Kallappa Magennavar	JD(U)	37,132	38.71	20,262
Belagavi	206	Chikkodi	Manohar Kattimani	JD(U)	41,375	52.10	Rathnamala Savanoor	INC	30,528	38.44	10,847
Belagavi	207	Raibag	Shama Ghatage	INC	52,728	50.05	Parashuram Jaganur	JD(U)	45,720	43.40	7,008
Belagavi	208	Kagwad	Pasagouda Patil	INC	31,462	35.38	Bharamgouda Alagouda Kage	Ind	22,593	25.41	8,869
Belagavi	209	Athani	Shahajan Dongaragaon	INC	29,020	28.65	Laxman Savadi	Ind	25,911	25.58	3,109
Bagalkot	210	Jamkhandi	Ramappa Kaluti	INC	66,018	54.53	Arunkumar Shah	JD(U)	50,964	42.09	15,054
Bagalkot	211	Bilgi	J. T. Patil	INC	51,313	47.61	Shrikant Kulkarni	BJP	38,604	35.82	12,709
Bagalkot	212	Mudhol	R. B. Timmapur	INC	53,097	48.93	Govind Karjol	JD(U)	52,658	48.53	439
Bagalkot	213	Bagalkot	Pralhad Pujari	BJP	40,418	47.84	Rajshekhar Kanthi	INC	40,280	47.68	138
Bagalkot	214	Badami	B. B. Chimmankatti	INC	42,962	49.24	Mahagundappa Pattanashetty	JD(U)	42,565	48.78	397
Bagalkot	215	Guledgud	S. G. Nanjayyanamath	INC	37,029	46.78	H. Y. Meti	JD(S)	20,326	25.68	16,703
Bagalkot	216	Hungund	Shivashankarappa Kashappanavar	INC	29,307	37.82	Gavisiddanagouda Patil	JD(U)	28,371	36.61	936
Bijapur	217	Muddebihal	C. S. Nadagouda	INC	43,662	57.23	Vimalabai Deshmukh	JD(U)	32,632	42.77	11,030
Bijapur	218	Huvina Hippargi	B. S. Patil Sasanur	INC	46,088	56.11	Shivaputrappa Desai	JD(U)	28,492	34.69	17,596
Bijapur	219	Basavana Bagevadi	S. K. Bellubbi	BJP	50,543	53.94	Basanagouda Patil	INC	40,487	43.21	10,056
Bijapur	220	Tikota	Shivanand Patil	BJP	49,080	53.17	Mallanagouda Patil	INC	41,649	45.12	7,431
Bijapur	221	Bijapur	Ustad Patel	INC	42,902	39.78	Appu Pattanshetty	BJP	39,749	36.85	3,153
Bijapur	222	Ballolli	H. R. Algur	INC	27,194	33.86	R. K. Rathod	JD(S)	24,667	30.71	2,527
Bijapur	223	Indi	Ravikant Patil	Ind	44,523	51.76	B. R. Patil	INC	25,203	29.30	19,320
Bijapur	224	Sindagi	Sharanappa Sunagar	INC	30,432	33.32	M. C. Managuli	Ind	19,675	21.54	10,757
