= Bheemanna Khandre =

Indian activist and politician (1925–2026)

Minister of Transport, Government of Karnataka
- In office 1992–1994

Personal details
- Born: 1 November 1925 Bhalki, Hyderabad State, India (now Karnataka, India)
- Died: 16 January 2026 (aged 100) Bhalki, Karnataka, India
- Citizenship: Indian
- Party: Indian National Congress
- Children: 8, including: Vijaykumar Khandre, Eshwara Khandre
- Relatives: Sagar Khandre (grandson)

Bheemanna Khandre (1 November 1925 – 16 January 2026) was an Indian independence activist, educationist and politician. A member of the Indian National Congress party, he was the Minister of Transport in the Government of Karnataka from 1992 to 1994. Khandre was elected to the Karnataka Legislative Assembly, including the erstwhile Mysore Legislative Assembly, for four terms.

== Background ==
Khandre was born on 1 November 1925 in Bhalki, Hyderabad State (present-day Karnataka, India). He held a BA LLB degree. Khandre married Lakshmi Bai, with whom he had three sons, including politicians Vijaykumar Khandre and Eshwara Khandre; and five daughters. Sagar Khandre, the Member of Parliament from Bidar Lok Sabha constituency, is his grandson.

Khandre died from respiratory failure on 16 January 2026 in Bhalki, at the age of 100. He was undergoing treatment in a hospital in Bidar for a few weeks prior to his death.

== Political career ==
Khandre was elected as a President of Bhalki Taluk Municipal Council in 1953. He was elected to the Karnataka Legislative Assembly from the Bhalki constituency for four terms, 1962, 1967, 1978 and 1983. In 1968, Khandre was made the president of the Bidar District Congress Committee.

Appointed the general secretary of Karnataka Pradesh Congress Committee and the convernor of State Kisan Cell of Karnataka in the year 1980, he participated in the All India Kisan Rally held at New Delhi on 16 February 1981 along with 16,000 farmers from the state.

In 1988, Khandre he was elected as a member of the Legislative Council of Karnataka from Bidar District, a feat which he repeated in 1994 to 2000.

He served as the Minister of Transport in Government of Karnataka from 1992 to 1994 and was the leader of the Upper House of Karnataka.

== Other ventures ==
Khandre was the president of Shanti Vardhak Education Society from 1963 to 1993.

Founder of two sugar factories under co-operative sector in Karnataka, he was the chairman of Bidar Sahakara Sakkare Karkhane for 12 years, Mahatma Gandhi Sahakara Sakkare Karkhane Ltd. and was the executive member of National Federation of Co-operative Sugar Factory. He was also executive member of Indian Sugar Export Corporation, New Delhi.

Khandre was also the President of Akhil Bharat Veerashaiva Mahasabha, an organisation for the development of the Lingayat community.

== Awards and recognition ==
Khandre was awarded the "Suvarna Karnataka Rajyotsava Award" by the Government of Karnataka. Gulbarga University also conferred the honorary degree of Doctor of Law (Honoris Causa) on him.
