= Hankuni =

Hankuni Hanakuni
- Village
- Location within Karnataka Location within India
- Coordinates: 17°42′43″N 77°8′20″E
- Country: India
- State: Karnataka
- District: Bidar district
- Taluk: Humnabad

Languages
  - Official: Kannada
- Time zone: UTC+5:30 (IST)
- Vehicle registration: KA

Hankuni is a village in the Humnabad taluk of Bidar district in Karnataka state, India.

== Demographics ==
Per the 2011 Census of India, Hankuni has a total population of 2668; of whom 1370 are male and 1298 female.

== Importance ==
Hanakuni is famous for the Ancient fort located in the village.

Also known by few Hindu temples like Hanuman temple, Lakshmi temple and Bhavani temple.

Hanakuni is well known for its fort located in the village.

== See also ==
- Bhatambra
- Bhalki
- Humnabad
- Bidar
