= Hulsoor Assembly constituency =

Former Assembly constituency in Karnataka, India

Coordinates: 18.018162°N 77.010178°E

Hulsoor
- Former constituency for the Karnataka Legislative Assembly

Constituency details
- Country: India
- Region: South India
- State: Karnataka
- Division: Gulbarga
- District: Bidar
- Lok Sabha constituency: Bidar
- Established: 1951
- Abolished: 2008
- Reservation: SC

Hulsoor Assembly constituency was one of the seats in Karnataka state assembly in India until 2008 when it was made defunct. It was part of Bidar Lok Sabha constituency.

== Members of the Legislative Assembly ==
Election	Member	Party
1952	Deshpande Bapurao	Indian National Congress
1957	Mahadeo Rao	Praja Socialist Party
1962	Bapu Rao	Independent politician
1967	P. R. Dhondibha	Indian National Congress
1972	Mahendra Kumar Kallappa	Indian National Congress
1978	Madanlal Badeappa	Indian National Congress
1983	Ramchander Veerappa	Indian National Congress
1985	Shivakhantha Cheture	Janata Party
1989	Mahendra Kumar Kallappa	Indian National Congress
1994	L. K. Chawan	Bharatiya Janata Party
1999	Rajendra Varma	Bharatiya Janata Party
2004	Rajendra Varma	Bharatiya Janata Party

== Election results ==
=== Assembly Election 2004 ===
2004 Karnataka Legislative Assembly election : Hulsoor
Party	Candidate	Votes	%	±%
BJP	Rajendra Varma	29,285	34.00%	▼10.70
Independent	Babu Honnanaik	27,850	32.33%	New
INC	Doddi Dashrath	11,669	13.55%	▼13.85
JD(S)	Sanju Kumar G. Dange	8,211	9.53%	▼6.54
Kannada Nadu Party	B. Vithal Dakulagi	3,417	3.97%	New
Independent	Gundappa Sharnappa Sherikar	1,559	1.81%	New
Independent	Bhimarao	1,383	1.61%	New
JP	Shivakhantha Cheture	1,149	1.33%	New
Independent	Shobhabai Bijapure	914	1.06%	New
Margin of victory		1,435	1.67%	▼15.63
Turnout		86,187	52.93%	▼0.81
Total valid votes		86,141		
Registered electors		162,838		▲14.31
BJP hold		Swing	▼10.70	

=== Assembly Election 1999 ===
1999 Karnataka Legislative Assembly election : Hulsoor
Party	Candidate	Votes	%	±%
BJP	Rajendra Varma	32,189	44.70%	▲5.25
INC	Shivaraj Hasankar	19,732	27.40%	▲15.47
JD(S)	Shravan Kumar M. Gaikwad	11,573	16.07%	New
BSP	B. Vithal Dakulagi	1,899	2.64%	▲0.53
RPI	Milind Baliram (Guruji)	1,746	2.42%	New
Independent	Rajendra Gopu Chawan	1,492	2.07%	New
Independent	L. K. Chawan	1,102	1.53%	New
Independent	Pyage Vaijanath	892	1.24%	New
Independent	H. Mahadevi	780	1.08%	New
Margin of victory		12,457	17.30%	▲11.23
Turnout		76,550	53.74%	▼2.63
Total valid votes		72,007		
Rejected ballots		4,530	5.92%	▲2.92
Registered electors		142,452		▲8.20
BJP hold		Swing	▲5.25	

=== Assembly Election 1994 ===
1994 Karnataka Legislative Assembly election : Hulsoor
Party	Candidate	Votes	%	±%
BJP	L. K. Chawan	28,402	39.45%	▲35.08
JD	Manik Rao Sambhaji Pranjape	24,034	33.38%	▲5.29
INC	Ramchandra Hosmani	8,587	11.93%	▼17.70
KRRS	Jairam Ghaleppa	3,920	5.45%	New
INC	Manikrao. M. Master	1,859	2.58%	New
BSP	Baburao Pandurangrao	1,518	2.11%	New
SP	Jayaraj Chature	1,450	2.01%	New
Independent	Babu Ramana Jalde	824	1.14%	New
Independent	Mohan Kishan Mllind Guruji	439	0.61%	New
Margin of victory		4,368	6.07%	▲4.53
Turnout		74,216	56.37%	▲4.42
Total valid votes		71,991		
Rejected ballots		2,225	3.00%	▼6.64
Registered electors		131,651		▲9.58
BJP gain from INC		Swing	▲9.82	

=== Assembly Election 1989 ===
1989 Karnataka Legislative Assembly election : Hulsoor
Party	Candidate	Votes	%	±%
INC	Mahendra Kumar Kallappa	16,709	29.63%	▲4.34
JD	Manik Rao Sambhaji Pranjape	15,842	28.09%	New
Independent	Surendra Veerupaksh Swamy Shastri	12,751	22.61%	New
Bharatiya Minorities Suraksha Mahasangh	Arjun Veerappa Janjeer	2,898	5.14%	New
BJP	Prithviraj. S. Jadhav	2,465	4.37%	▲2.77
JP	Arjun Rao Dange	1,713	3.04%	New
RPI	Gangamma Tulsiram Phoole	1,115	1.98%	New
Independent	Laxman Gundappa Gupta	925	1.64%	New
Independent	Doddi Dashrath Nagappa	581	1.03%	New
Margin of victory		867	1.54%	▼18.98
Turnout		62,414	51.95%	▲3.50
Total valid votes		56,399		
Rejected ballots		6,015	9.64%	▲7.30
Registered electors		120,137		▲27.21
INC gain from JP		Swing	▼16.17	

=== Assembly Election 1985 ===
1985 Karnataka Legislative Assembly election : Hulsoor
Party	Candidate	Votes	%	±%
JP	Shivakhantha Cheture	20,468	45.80%	▲12.14
INC	Ramachandra Veerappa	11,300	25.29%	▼23.89
IC(S)	Tataya Rao Kamble	11,191	25.04%	New
BJP	Rajendra Varma	714	1.60%	▼14.61
Independent	Ghalewwa Dhulappa	405	0.91%	New
Margin of victory		9,168	20.52%	▲5.00
Turnout		45,759	48.45%	▲4.96
Total valid votes		44,688		
Rejected ballots		1,071	2.34%	▼0.88
Registered electors		94,441		▲9.53
JP gain from INC		Swing	▼3.38	

=== Assembly Election 1983 ===
1983 Karnataka Legislative Assembly election : Hulsoor
Party	Candidate	Votes	%	±%
INC	Ramchander Veerappa	17,847	49.18%	▲34.40
JP	Jayaraj Chature	12,216	33.66%	▲1.38
BJP	M. Asaji Eknath	5,881	16.21%	New
Independent	Vithal Rao Cheelu Karbhari	346	0.95%	New
Margin of victory		5,631	15.52%	▲11.72
Turnout		37,497	43.49%	▼7.35
Total valid votes		36,290		
Rejected ballots		1,207	3.22%	▼0.16
Registered electors		86,222		▲4.94
INC gain from INC(I)		Swing	▲13.10	

=== Assembly Election 1978 ===
1978 Karnataka Legislative Assembly election : Hulsoor
Party	Candidate	Votes	%	±%
INC(I)	Madanlal Badeappa	14,562	36.08%	New
JP	Tataya Rao Kamble	13,027	32.28%	New
INC	Trimbak Dange	5,965	14.78%	▼52.35
Independent	Thakursing Narayansing Rathod	4,924	12.20%	New
Independent	Mahendra Kumar	1,342	3.33%	New
Independent	Zareppa Vishwanath	536	1.33%	New
Margin of victory		1,535	3.80%	▼42.31
Turnout		41,769	50.84%	▲20.25
Total valid votes		40,356		
Rejected ballots		1,413	3.38%	▲3.38
Registered electors		82,164		▲23.27
INC(I) gain from INC		Swing	▼31.05	

=== Assembly Election 1972 ===
1972 Mysore State Legislative Assembly election : Hulsoor
Party	Candidate	Votes	%	±%
INC	Mahendra Kumar Kallappa	13,282	67.13%	▲13.69
SSP	Maruthi Devendra	4,159	21.02%	New
Independent	Shivram Mogha	954	4.82%	New
ABJS	Brahmakant Narsing Rao	667	3.37%	New
Independent	M. Asaji Eknath	471	2.38%	New
Independent	Nagendra Rao Narsing	252	1.27%	New
Margin of victory		9,123	46.11%	▲36.27
Turnout		20,389	30.59%	▼14.83
Total valid votes		19,785		
Registered electors		66,656		▲15.32
INC hold		Swing	▲13.69	

=== Assembly Election 1967 ===
1967 Mysore State Legislative Assembly election : Hulsoor
Party	Candidate	Votes	%	±%
INC	P. R. Dhondibha	13,220	53.44%	▲10.47
RPI	B. D. Tipkurle	10,785	43.60%	New
Independent	N. R. N. Rao	734	2.97%	New
Margin of victory		2,435	9.84%	▲9.72
Turnout		26,255	45.42%	▼16.25
Total valid votes		24,739		
Registered electors		57,802		▲4.85
INC gain from Independent		Swing	▲10.35	

=== Assembly Election 1962 ===
1962 Mysore State Legislative Assembly election : Hulsoor
Party	Candidate	Votes	%	±%
Independent	Bapu Rao	13,424	43.09%	New
INC	Subhadra Bai	13,386	42.97%	▲1.51
PSP	Manikappa	4,344	13.94%	▼44.60
Margin of victory		38	0.12%	▼16.97
Turnout		33,996	61.67%	▲14.03
Total valid votes		31,154		
Registered electors		55,127		▲26.92
Independent gain from PSP		Swing	▼15.45	

=== Assembly Election 1957 ===
1957 Mysore State Legislative Assembly election : Hulsoor
Party	Candidate	Votes	%	±%
PSP	Mahadeo Rao	12,114	58.54%	New
INC	Bhimarao	8,578	41.46%	▼14.57
Margin of victory		3,536	17.09%	▼0.70
Turnout		20,692	47.64%	▼7.32
Total valid votes		20,692		
Registered electors		43,435		▼14.31
PSP gain from INC		Swing	▲2.51	

=== Assembly Election 1952 ===
1952 Hyderabad State Legislative Assembly election : Hulsur
Party	Candidate	Votes	%	±%
INC	Deshpande Bapurao	15,611	56.03%	New
Socialist Party (India)	Jawlgekar Madhavrao Sadasiv Vakil	10,656	38.25%	New
PDF	Kulkarni Rangannath Kishanrao Saigeonkar	1,593	5.72%	New
Margin of victory		4,955	17.79%	
Turnout		27,860	54.96%	
Total valid votes		27,860		
Registered electors		50,689		
INC win (new seat)				

== See also ==
- List of constituencies of the Karnataka Legislative Assembly
