= Eshwara Khandre =

Indian politician (born 1962)

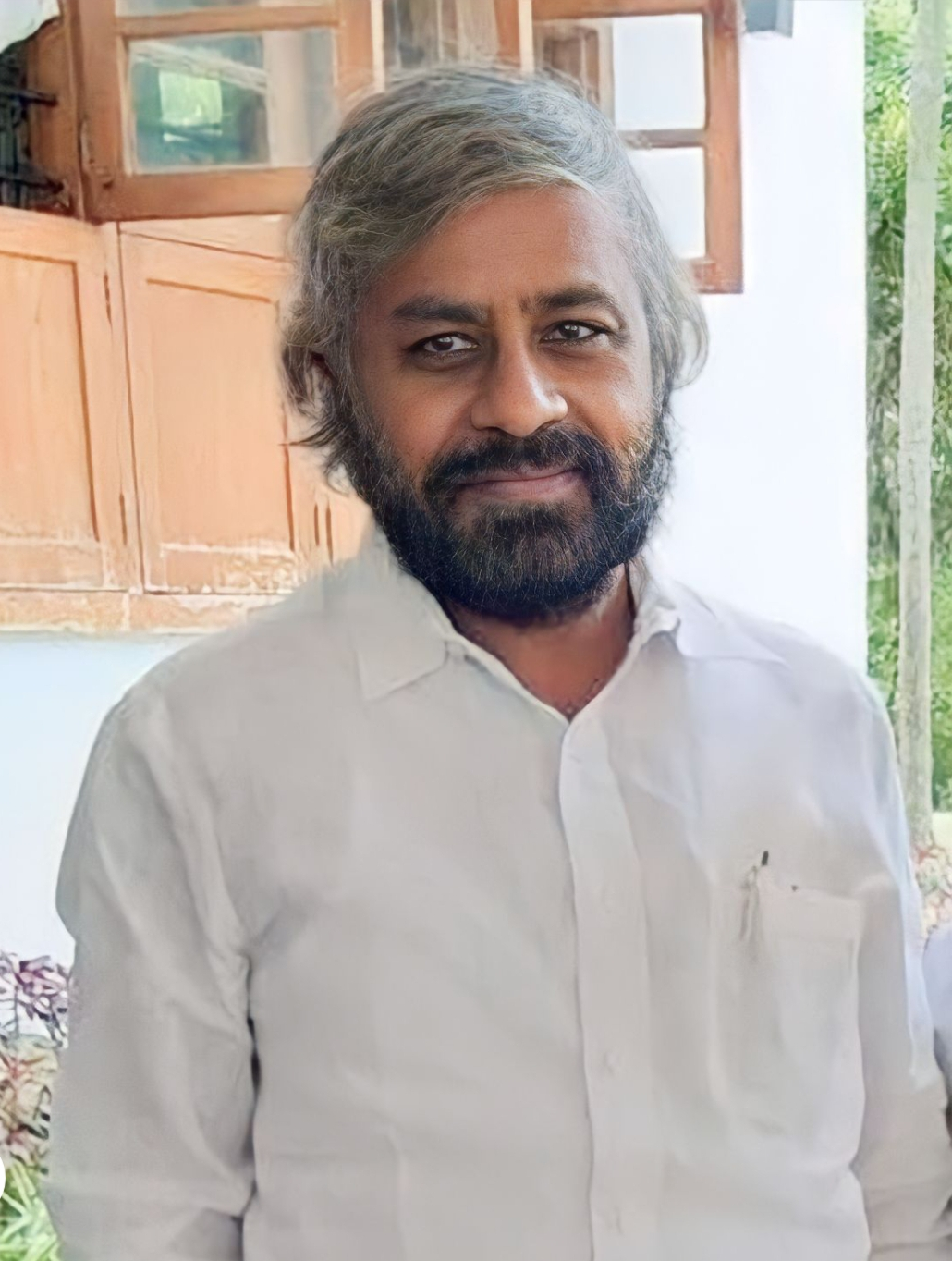
- Khandre in 2023

Cabinet Minister Government of Karnataka
- Incumbent
- Assumed office 3 June 2026
- Governor: Thawarchand Gehlot
- Cabinet: Shivakumar ministry
- Chief Minister: D. K. Shivakumar
- Ministry and Departments: Rural Development; Panchayati Raj
- Preceded by: Priyank Kharge
- In office 27 May 2023 – 29 May 2026
- Governor: Thawarchand Gehlot
- Cabinet: Second Siddaramaiah ministry
- Chief Minister: Siddaramaiah
- Ministry and Departments: Forest; Ecology; Environment
- Preceded by: Anand Singh
- Succeeded by: Ramalinga Reddy

Member of the Karnataka Legislative Assembly
- Incumbent
- Assumed office 25 May 2008
- Preceded by: Prakash Khandre
- Constituency: Bhalki

Minister of State for Municipalities & Local bodies and Public Enterprises in Government of Karnataka
- In office 2016–2018
- Preceded by: Balachandra Jarkiholi
- Succeeded by: Ramesh Jarkiholi

Working President of Karnataka Pradesh Congress Committee
- Incumbent
- Assumed office 4 July 2018
- President: D. K. Shivakumar

Incharge Minister of Bidar district
- Incumbent
- Assumed office 9 June 2023
- Preceded by: Prabhu Chauhan

Personal details
- Born: Eshwara Bheemanna Khandre; 15 January 1962 (age 64) Bhalki, Mysore State (present–day Karnataka), India
- Party: Indian National Congress
- Children: Sagar Khandre
- Parent: Bheemanna Khandre (father)
- Relatives: Vijaykumar Khandre (brother)
- Education: Bachelor of Engineering
- Alma mater: PDA College of Engineering; Gulbarga University
- Occupation: Politician; Agriculturist; social worker
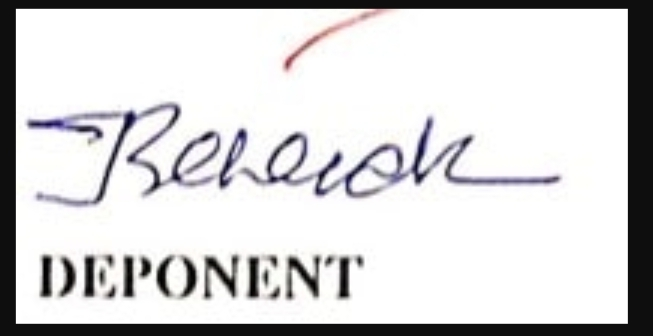
- Signature
- Website: https://eshwarbkhandre.com/

Eshwar Bheemanna Khandre (born 15 January 1962) is an Indian politician from Karnataka. He is serving as a cabinet minister in the Government of Karnataka since May 2023. He is also serving as the Working President of the Karnataka Pradesh Congress Committee, since 2018. He is a Member of the Karnataka Legislative Assembly from Bhalki constituency since 25 May 2008.

== Personal life ==
Khandre was born on 15 January 1962 to former minister Bheemanna Khandre and Laxmibai in Bhalki. He received a bachelor of engineering degree in 1985 from Poojya Doddappa Appa College of Engineering, Gulbarga, Gulbarga University. He is the third member of the Khandre family to be elected to the Karnataka Legislative Assembly from the district. His brother Vijaykumar Khandre, also represented the constituency two times. His son Sagar Eshwar Khandre, is the Member of Parliament in the 18th Lok Sabha representing Bidar constituency since June 2024. Khandre is the chairman of Shantivardhak Education Society. He is an agriculturalist by profession and engaged in social service.

== Constituency ==
Khandre represents the Bhalki constituency.

He won from Bhalki constituency in 2008, 2013, 2018 and 2023.

== Political career ==
Khandre is a member of the Indian National Congress (INC) and KPCC working President of Karnataka State. In 2002, he and his brother Vijaykumar were accused in the murder of BJP worker Suresh Khed, but were subsequently granted bail.

In 2003, it was reported that he was expelled from the party for campaigning against INC candidate Basavaraj Patil Humnabad in the Legislative Council elections in Bidar.

In 2008, Khandre defeated Bharatiya Janata Party (BJP) candidate Prakash Khandre by a margin of 20,971 votes. In the 2004 election, he was defeated by the BJP candidate.

He was the Minister of Municipal Administration & Public Enterprises of Karnataka from 2016 to 2018 in Siddaramaiah ministry. He was Minister in Charge of Bidar district.

He has publicly warned government officials who refuse or wilfully failing to stop forest land encroachment and asked them to pursue efficiency.
