= Ahmadabad, Bhalki =

Ahmadabad
- village
- Ahmedabad, Bhalki is in Bidar district

- Location in Karnataka, India Ahmadabad (India)
- Coordinates: 18°02′N 77°37′E
- Country: India
- State: Karnataka
- District: Bidar
- Talukas: Bhalki

Government
  - Body: Village Panchayat

Population (2001)
  - Total: 1,500

language
  - marathi and kananda: marathi and kananda
- Time zone: UTC+5:30 (IST)
- Postal code: 585413
- Nearest city: Bidar
- Civic agency: Village Panchayat

Ahmadabad, Bhalki is a village in the southern state of Karnataka, India. It is located in the Bhalki taluk of Bidar district in Karnataka.

== See also ==
- Bidar
- Districts of Karnataka
