= Dhanura =

- village
- Location in Karnataka, India Dhanura (India)
- Coordinates: 18.03°N 77.22°E
- Country: India
- State: Karnataka
- District: Bidar
- Talukas: Bhalki

Population (2001)
  - Total: 5,219

Languages
  - Official: Kannada
- Time zone: UTC+5:30 (IST)

Dhanura is a village in the southern state of Karnataka, India. It is located in the Bhalki taluk of Bidar district in Karnataka.

== Demographics ==
As of 2001 India census, Dhanura had a population of 5219 with 2699 males and 2520 females.

== See also ==
- Bidar
- Districts of Karnataka
