= Malchapur =

Malchapur Malchapur
- village
- Location in Karnataka, India Malchapur (India)
- Coordinates: 17°56′03″N 77°22′41″E
- Country: India
- State: Karnataka
- District: Bidar
- Taluka: Bhalki Taluka

Government
  - Type: Gram Panchayat (Village Panchayat)
  - Body: Malchapur Gram Panchayat

Area
  - Total: 16 km^{2} (6.2 sq mi)

Population (2020)
  - Total: 3,385
  - Density: 249/km^{2} (640/sq mi)
- Demonym: Malchapurkar

Languages
  - Official: Kannada
- Time zone: UTC+5:30 (IST)
- Pin code: 585413
- Nearest city: Bidar

Malchapur is a panchayat village located in Bhalki taluka of Bidar District, Karnataka, India. The village of Malchapur is 18 km by road west of the city of Bidar.

There are three villages in the Malchapur gram panchayat: Malchapur, Khanapur and Rudnoor.

== Demographics ==
As of 2001 census, the village of Malchapur had 2,506 inhabitants, with 1,283 males (51.2%) and 1,223 females (48.8%), for a gender ratio of 953 females per thousand males.
