= Aknapur =

- village
- Aknapur is in Bidar district

- Location in Karnataka, India Aknapur (India)
- Coordinates: 18°23′8.75″N 77°16′20.11″E
- Country: India
- State: Karnataka
- District: Bidar
- Talukas: Aurad

Government
  - Body: Village Panchayat

Languages
  - Official: Kannada
- Time zone: UTC+5:30 (IST)
- Nearest city: Bidar
- Civic agency: Village Panchayat

Aknapur is a village in the southern state of Karnataka, India. It is located in the Aurad taluk of Bidar district.

== See also ==
- Bidar
- Districts of Karnataka
