= Bhatambra =

- village
- Interactive map of Bhatambra
- Location in Karnataka, India Bhatambra (India)
- Coordinates: 18.0654°N 77.1625°E
- Country: India
- State: Karnataka
- District: Bidar
- Taluk: Bhalki
- Lok Sabha Constituency: Bidar
- Nearest city: Bhalki

Government
  - Type: Panchayat Raj
  - Body: Gram Panchayat Bhatambra

Area
  - Total: 28.42 km^{2} (10.97 sq mi)
  - Rank: 3rd :Bhalki
- Elevation: 607 m (1,991 ft)

Population (2020)
  - Total: 8,942
  - Density: 363/km^{2} (940/sq mi)
- Demonym: Bhatambrakar

Languages
  - Official: Kannada
- Time zone: UTC+5:30 (IST)
- PIN CODE: 585411
- Vehicle registration: KA 38

Bhatambra is a village in the southern state of Karnataka, India. It is located in the Bhalki taluk of Bidar district in Karnataka.

== Bhatambra Fort ==
Bhatambra is famous for the 12th century fort located in the village. The fort is now also in bad conditions

== Demographics ==
As of 2001 India census, Bhatambra had a population of 7,523, with 3,867 males and 3,656 females.

== See also ==
- Aurad
- Basavakalyan
- Humnabad
- Bidar
- Districts of Karnataka
