= Bhagwanth Khuba =

Indian politician

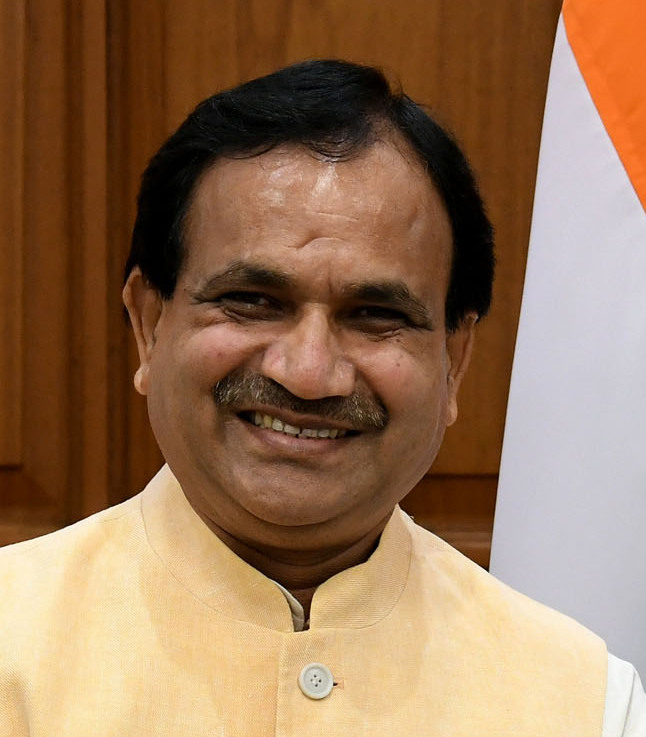
- Official Portrait of the Bhagwanth Khuba dated on 4 April 2023

Minister of State for New and Renewable Energy of India
- In office 7 July 2021 – 11 June 2024
- Prime Minister: Narendra Modi
- Preceded by: S. Jagathrakshakan
- Succeeded by: Shripad Naik

Minister of State for Chemicals and Fertilizers of India
- In office 7 July 2021 – 11 June 2024
- Prime Minister: Narendra Modi
- Preceded by: Mansukh Mandaviya
- Succeeded by: Anupriya Patel

Member of Parliament, Lok Sabha
- In office 18 May 2014 – 11 June 2024
- Preceded by: N. Dharam Singh
- Succeeded by: Sagar Eshwar Khandre
- Constituency: Bidar Lok Sabha constituency

Personal details
- Born: 1 June 1967 (age 59) Aurad, Mysore State (present–day Karnataka), India
- Party: Bharatiya Janata Party (18 May 2014–present)
- Spouse: Sheela Khuba (m. 1999)
- Children: 3
- Education: Siddaganga Institute of Technology (Bachelor in Mechanical Engineering)
- Occupation: Politician
- Profession: Agriculturist; social worker
- Positions Held: 13 September 2019 – 7 July 2021: Member of Consultative Committee of Ministry of Railways; 13 September 2019 – 7 July 2021: Member of Standing Committee on Ministry of Agriculture; 19 October 2016 – 25 May 2019: Member of Standing Committee on Food, Consumer Affairs and Public Distribution; 19 October 2016 – 25 May 2019: Member of Consultative Committee of Ministry of Railways; 1 September 2014 – 18 October 2016: Member of Standing Committee on Ministry of Social Justice and Empowerment; 15 September 2014 – 25 May 2019: Member of Committee on Provision of Computers to Members of Lok Sabha

Bhagwanth Khuba (born 1 June 1967) is an Indian politician who served as the union Minister of State for Chemicals and Fertilizers, New and Renewable Energy in Government of India from 7 July 2021 to 5 June 2024. He was the Member of the Lok Sabha from Bidar Lok Sabha constituency in Karnataka from 18 May 2014 to 4 June 2024. He is a member of the Bharatiya Janata Party.

In the 2024 Lok Sabha election, Khuba lost to Sagar Eshwar Khandre of Indian National Congress by a margin of more than 1.2 lakh votes.

== Life and background ==
Khuba was born in Aurad to Gurubasappa Khuba and Mahadevi Khuba on 1 June 1967. He is a B.E. in Mechanical Engineering from Siddaganga Institute of Technology, Tumkur. He married Sheela Khuba on 9 May 1999, with whom he has a son and two daughters. He is an agriculturist and does social work.

== Controversies ==
The Hyderabad Karnataka Janapara Sangarsha Samiti has criticised Khuba for supposed bias towards Maharashtra for getting its new rail lines and not making enough effort to secure a rail division for Kalaburagi.
