= Bhalki Assembly constituency =

Vidhana Sabha constituency in Karnataka

Coordinates: 18.05°N 77.22°E

Bhalki
- Constituency No. 51 for the Karnataka Legislative Assembly

Constituency details
- Country: India
- Region: South India
- State: Karnataka
- District: Bidar
- Lok Sabha constituency: Bidar
- Established: 1951
- Total electors: 230,959
- Reservation: None

Member of Legislative Assembly
- 16th Karnataka Legislative Assembly
- Incumbent Eshwara Khandre
- Party: Indian National Congress
- Elected year: 2023
- Preceded by: Prakash Khandre

Bhalki Assembly constituency is one of the 224 seats in Karnataka Legislative Assembly in India. It is a segment of Bidar Lok Sabha constituency.

== Members of the Legislative Assembly ==
| Election | Member | Party |
|---|---|---|
| 1952 | Kamtikar Murlidhar Rao Srinivas Rao | Indian National Congress |
| 1957 | Balwantrao | Independent politician |
| 1957 | B. Sham Sunder | Independent politician |
| 1962 | Bhimanna Shivlingappa | Praja Socialist Party |
| 1967 | Bhimanna Shivlingappa | Indian National Congress |
| 1972 | Subhash Asture | Indian National Congress |
| 1978 | Bhimanna Shivlingappa | Indian National Congress |
| 1983 | Bhimanna Shivlingappa | Indian National Congress |
| 1985 | Kalyan Rao Sangappa Molkheri | Janata Party |
| 1989 | Vijaykumar Khandre | Independent politician |
| 1994 | Vijaykumar Khandre | Indian National Congress |
| 1999 | Prakash Khandre | Bharatiya Janata Party |
| 2004 | Prakash Khandre | Bharatiya Janata Party |
| 2008 | Eshwara Khandre | Indian National Congress |
| 2013 | Eshwara Khandre | Indian National Congress |
| 2018 | Eshwara Khandre | Indian National Congress |
| 2023 | Eshwara Khandre | Indian National Congress |

== Election results ==
=== Assembly Election 2023 ===
2023 Karnataka Legislative Assembly election : Bhalki
| Party | Candidate | Votes | % | ±% |
|---|---|---|---|---|
| INC | Eshwara Khandre | 99,451 | 56.90% | ▲6.22 |
| BJP | Prakash Khandre | 71,745 | 41.05% | ▲3.20 |
| NOTA | None of the above | 851 | 0.49% | ▼0.13 |
| Margin of victory | | 27,706 | 15.85% | ▲3.02 |
| Turnout | | 175,009 | 75.77% | ▲1.37 |
| Total valid votes | | 174,778 | | |
| Registered electors | | 230,959 | | ▲2.78 |
| INC hold | | Swing | ▲6.22 | |

=== Assembly Election 2018 ===
2018 Karnataka Legislative Assembly election : Bhalki
| Party | Candidate | Votes | % | ±% |
|---|---|---|---|---|
| INC | Eshwara Khandre | 84,673 | 50.68% | ▲5.74 |
| BJP | D. K. Sidram | 63,235 | 37.85% | ▲14.85 |
| JD(S) | Prakash Khandre | 15,142 | 9.06% | ▲7.31 |
| NOTA | None of the above | 1,042 | 0.62% | New |
| Margin of victory | | 21,438 | 12.83% | ▲5.34 |
| Turnout | | 167,172 | 74.40% | ▲0.90 |
| Total valid votes | | 167,058 | | |
| Registered electors | | 224,708 | | ▲12.09 |
| INC hold | | Swing | ▲5.74 | |

=== Assembly Election 2013 ===
2013 Karnataka Legislative Assembly election : Bhalki
| Party | Candidate | Votes | % | ±% |
|---|---|---|---|---|
| INC | Eshwara Khandre | 58,012 | 44.94% | ▼5.07 |
| KJP | D. K. Sidram | 48,343 | 37.45% | New |
| BJP | Prakash Khandre | 29,694 | 23.00% | ▼10.75 |
| Independent | D. K. Sonphule | 2,414 | 1.87% | New |
| JD(S) | Janardhan | 2,255 | 1.75% | ▼8.25 |
| Independent | Bhalkeshwar | 1,561 | 1.21% | New |
| BSP | Ismalasha | 1,102 | 0.85% | ▼1.30 |
| BSRCP | Jagannath Jamadar | 1,024 | 0.79% | New |
| Independent | Ashok | 1,012 | 0.78% | New |
| Margin of victory | | 9,669 | 7.49% | ▼8.77 |
| Turnout | | 147,350 | 73.50% | ▲7.08 |
| Total valid votes | | 129,101 | | |
| Registered electors | | 200,478 | | ▲3.09 |
| INC hold | | Swing | ▼5.07 | |

=== Assembly Election 2008 ===
2008 Karnataka Legislative Assembly election : Bhalki
| Party | Candidate | Votes | % | ±% |
|---|---|---|---|---|
| INC | Eshwara Khandre | 64,492 | 50.01% | ▲7.82 |
| BJP | Prakash Khandre | 43,521 | 33.75% | ▼18.26 |
| JD(S) | Anil P. Bhusare | 12,893 | 10.00% | ▲8.20 |
| BSP | Yadavarao Kanse | 2,772 | 2.15% | ▲0.37 |
| Independent | Venkatrao S/o Kishanrao | 1,605 | 1.24% | New |
| Independent | Rajkumar Shivalingayya | 1,009 | 0.78% | New |
| Independent | Veeranna Basavanappa | 926 | 0.72% | New |
| Margin of victory | | 20,971 | 16.26% | ▲6.44 |
| Turnout | | 129,161 | 66.42% | ▲0.12 |
| Total valid votes | | 128,947 | | |
| Registered electors | | 194,461 | | ▲27.35 |
| INC gain from BJP | | Swing | ▼2.00 | |

=== Assembly Election 2004 ===
2004 Karnataka Legislative Assembly election : Bhalki
| Party | Candidate | Votes | % | ±% |
|---|---|---|---|---|
| BJP | Prakash Khandre | 52,652 | 52.01% | ▼2.90 |
| INC | Eshwara Khandre | 42,711 | 42.19% | ▼0.69 |
| JD(S) | Babu Rao | 1,821 | 1.80% | ▲0.57 |
| BSP | Kundan | 1,804 | 1.78% | ▲1.01 |
| Margin of victory | | 9,941 | 9.82% | ▼2.21 |
| Turnout | | 101,241 | 66.30% | ▼0.49 |
| Total valid votes | | 101,230 | | |
| Registered electors | | 152,700 | | ▲15.53 |
| BJP hold | | Swing | ▼2.90 | |

=== Assembly Election 1999 ===
1999 Karnataka Legislative Assembly election : Bhalki
| Party | Candidate | Votes | % | ±% |
|---|---|---|---|---|
| BJP | Prakash Khandre | 47,132 | 54.91% | ▲32.06 |
| INC | Dr. Vijayakumar Bhimanna Khandre | 36,805 | 42.88% | ▼2.23 |
| JD(S) | Shivajraj Patil Malchapur | 1,054 | 1.23% | New |
| BSP | Bhimanna Kolle | 660 | 0.77% | ▼9.06 |
| Margin of victory | | 10,327 | 12.03% | ▼10.23 |
| Turnout | | 88,279 | 66.79% | ▲1.81 |
| Total valid votes | | 85,828 | | |
| Rejected ballots | | 2,451 | 2.78% | ▲0.82 |
| Registered electors | | 132,171 | | ▲6.28 |
| BJP gain from INC | | Swing | ▲9.80 | |

=== Assembly Election 1994 ===
1994 Karnataka Legislative Assembly election : Bhalki
| Party | Candidate | Votes | % | ±% |
|---|---|---|---|---|
| INC | Vijaykumar Khandre | 35,739 | 45.11% | ▲30.44 |
| BJP | Baburao Madkatti | 18,100 | 22.85% | New |
| JD | Eshwar Chakote | 15,480 | 19.54% | ▼10.50 |
| BSP | Shobha Vijay | 7,789 | 9.83% | New |
| INC | Hamshetty Sangappa | 1,074 | 1.36% | New |
| Independent | John Chandrappa | 686 | 0.87% | New |
| Margin of victory | | 17,639 | 22.26% | ▲4.61 |
| Turnout | | 80,812 | 64.98% | ▲0.25 |
| Total valid votes | | 79,225 | | |
| Rejected ballots | | 1,587 | 1.96% | ▼5.22 |
| Registered electors | | 124,356 | | ▲9.82 |
| INC gain from Independent | | Swing | ▼2.58 | |

=== Assembly Election 1989 ===
1989 Karnataka Legislative Assembly election : Bhalki
| Party | Candidate | Votes | % | ±% |
|---|---|---|---|---|
| Independent | Vijaykumar Khandre | 32,445 | 47.69% | New |
| JD | Vijay Kumar Keshavrao Kanji | 20,438 | 30.04% | New |
| INC | Subhash Asture | 9,979 | 14.67% | ▼31.66 |
| JP | Kalyan Rao Sangappa Molkheri | 2,479 | 3.64% | New |
| Independent | Prakash Tulshi Ram Bhavi Katti | 1,822 | 2.68% | New |
| Independent | Sravan Kumar Huplekar | 505 | 0.74% | New |
| Margin of victory | | 12,007 | 17.65% | ▲15.02 |
| Turnout | | 73,300 | 64.73% | ▼1.08 |
| Total valid votes | | 68,039 | | |
| Rejected ballots | | 5,261 | 7.18% | ▲5.03 |
| Registered electors | | 113,233 | | ▲27.54 |
| Independent gain from JP | | Swing | ▼1.27 | |

=== Assembly Election 1985 ===
1985 Karnataka Legislative Assembly election : Bhalki
| Party | Candidate | Votes | % | ±% |
|---|---|---|---|---|
| JP | Kalyan Rao Sangappa Molkheri | 27,994 | 48.96% | ▲10.27 |
| INC | Bhimanna Shivalingappa Khandare | 26,490 | 46.33% | ▼14.98 |
| BJP | Pralhad Gangaram Sharma | 1,179 | 2.06% | New |
| Independent | Eshwar Khandre | 734 | 1.28% | New |
| Independent | Ganapati Shivarao Sangolgi | 422 | 0.74% | New |
| Independent | Ashok Pundalik Sagar | 355 | 0.62% | New |
| Margin of victory | | 1,504 | 2.63% | ▼20.00 |
| Turnout | | 58,430 | 65.81% | ▼1.75 |
| Total valid votes | | 57,174 | | |
| Rejected ballots | | 1,256 | 2.15% | ▼0.37 |
| Registered electors | | 88,783 | | ▲11.20 |
| JP gain from INC | | Swing | ▼12.35 | |

=== Assembly Election 1983 ===
1983 Karnataka Legislative Assembly election : Bhalki
| Party | Candidate | Votes | % | ±% |
|---|---|---|---|---|
| INC | Bheemanna Khandre | 32,239 | 61.31% | ▲16.74 |
| JP | Baburao Gorchin Cholik | 20,342 | 38.69% | ▲21.65 |
| Margin of victory | | 11,897 | 22.63% | ▲13.24 |
| Turnout | | 53,941 | 67.56% | ▼3.04 |
| Total valid votes | | 52,581 | | |
| Rejected ballots | | 1,360 | 2.52% | ▼0.52 |
| Registered electors | | 79,839 | | ▲6.80 |
| INC hold | | Swing | ▲16.74 | |

=== Assembly Election 1978 ===
1978 Karnataka Legislative Assembly election : Bhalki
| Party | Candidate | Votes | % | ±% |
|---|---|---|---|---|
| INC | Bheemanna Khandre | 22,806 | 44.57% | ▼28.54 |
| INC(I) | Bidu Rao Gorehinchollikar | 17,999 | 35.17% | New |
| JP | D. K. Sidram | 8,720 | 17.04% | New |
| Independent | Shivraj Narsappa Rampure | 1,300 | 2.54% | New |
| Margin of victory | | 4,807 | 9.39% | ▼39.00 |
| Turnout | | 52,773 | 70.60% | ▲26.08 |
| Total valid votes | | 51,171 | | |
| Rejected ballots | | 1,602 | 3.04% | ▲3.04 |
| Registered electors | | 74,754 | | ▲5.67 |
| INC hold | | Swing | ▼28.54 | |

=== Assembly Election 1972 ===
1972 Mysore State Legislative Assembly election : Bhalki
| Party | Candidate | Votes | % | ±% |
|---|---|---|---|---|
| INC | Subhash Asture | 22,561 | 73.11% | ▲7.38 |
| SSP | Heerachand Waghmare | 7,628 | 24.72% | New |
| ABJS | Shivsharanappa Wali | 669 | 2.17% | New |
| Margin of victory | | 14,933 | 48.39% | ▲16.92 |
| Turnout | | 31,497 | 44.52% | ▼18.69 |
| Total valid votes | | 30,858 | | |
| Registered electors | | 70,746 | | ▲19.70 |
| INC hold | | Swing | ▲7.38 | |

=== Assembly Election 1967 ===
1967 Mysore State Legislative Assembly election : Bhalki
| Party | Candidate | Votes | % | ±% |
|---|---|---|---|---|
| INC | B. Shivalingappa | 23,210 | 65.73% | ▲40.31 |
| Independent | B. R. L. Rao | 12,099 | 34.27% | New |
| Margin of victory | | 11,111 | 31.47% | ▲9.38 |
| Turnout | | 37,358 | 63.21% | ▲8.31 |
| Total valid votes | | 35,309 | | |
| Registered electors | | 59,103 | | ▲19.14 |
| INC gain from PSP | | Swing | ▲17.39 | |

=== Assembly Election 1962 ===
1962 Mysore State Legislative Assembly election : Bhalki
| Party | Candidate | Votes | % | ±% |
|---|---|---|---|---|
| PSP | Bhimanna Shivlingappa | 12,114 | 48.34% | ▲9.17 |
| Independent | Vijay Kumar Bheemanna Khandre | 6,577 | 26.25% | New |
| INC | Neelkanthayya Mahadayya | 6,369 | 25.42% | ▲9.19 |
| Margin of victory | | 5,537 | 22.09% | ▲19.85 |
| Turnout | | 27,234 | 54.90% | ▲9.97 |
| Total valid votes | | 25,060 | | |
| Registered electors | | 49,610 | | ▼37.49 |
| PSP gain from Independent | | Swing | ▲25.78 | |

=== Assembly Election 1957 ===
1957 Mysore State Legislative Assembly election : Bhalki
| Party | Candidate | Votes | % | ±% |
|---|---|---|---|---|
| Independent | Balwantrao | 16,087 | 22.56% | New |
| Independent | B. Sham Sunder | 15,718 | 22.04% | New |
| PSP | Bheemanna | 14,493 | 20.32% | New |
| PSP | Sharanappa | 13,444 | 18.85% | New |
| INC | Srinivasarao | 7,076 | 9.92% | ▼43.31 |
| INC | Sidram Raikoda | 4,499 | 6.31% | ▼46.92 |
| Margin of victory | | 1,594 | 2.24% | ▼16.60 |
| Turnout | | 71,317 | 44.93% | ▼0.01 |
| Total valid votes | | 71,317 | | |
| Registered electors | | 79,367 | | ▲63.96 |
| Independent gain from INC | | Swing | ▼30.67 | |

=== Assembly Election 1952 ===
1952 Hyderabad State Legislative Assembly election : Bhalki
| Party | Candidate | Votes | % | ±% |
|---|---|---|---|---|
| INC | Kamtikar Murlidhar Rao Srinivas Rao | 11,581 | 53.23% | New |
| Socialist Party (India) | Shankarappa Bashetti Vakil | 7,483 | 34.40% | New |
| PDF | Babarao Eknath Rao | 2,692 | 12.37% | New |
| Margin of victory | | 4,098 | 18.84% | |
| Turnout | | 21,756 | 44.94% | |
| Total valid votes | | 21,756 | | |
| Registered electors | | 48,407 | | |
| INC win (new seat) | | | | |

== See also ==
- List of constituencies of Karnataka Legislative Assembly
