= Narsingrao Suryawanshi =

Indian politician

Narsingarao Suryawanshi

Member of Parliament, Lok Sabha
- In office 1980-1991
- Preceded by: Shankar Dev Balaji
- Succeeded by: Ramchandra Veerappa
- Constituency: Bidar
- In office 2004–2009
- Preceded by: Ramchandra Veerappa
- Succeeded by: Dharam Singh

Personal details
- Born: 20 January 1952 (age 74) Dongoan (M)
- Party: Indian National Congress
- Spouse: Sushila Suryawanshi
- Children: 3 sons and 1 daughter
- Education: Bachelor of Science
- Alma mater: Shivaji Mahavidhyalaya, Latur Maharashtra, Marathwada University, Aurangabad Maharashtra
- As of 23 September, 2011

Narsingrao Hullaji Suryawanshi (born 20 January 1952) is an Indian politician who served as Member of Parliament in the Lok Sabha from Bidar for four terms. He belongs to the Indian National Congress party.

== Early life ==
Narsingrao Suryawanshi was born in Dongaon village of Aurad Taluk in Bidar District. Suryawanshi and his siblings are children of farmers. He completed and earned a B.Sc. degree at Marathwada University, Aurangabad (Maharashtra) in 1974.

== Career ==
After graduating, he became a social worker. He traveled to villages, educating people about the 'No Dowry' system, and about the removal of untouchability, which was a major concern that year. He started Jawahar Lal Nehru Polytechnic College at Kushnoor and opened a hostel for poor students.

He started Lal Bahadur Shastri Primary School, Mudhol. He served as president of Rastriya Rachnatmak Samitee and Arunodaya Education Society.

=== Politics ===
Suryawanshi applied for the Congress ticket in 1980 by post. He won the election in 1980 with a huge margin of 1.05 lakh votes (total votes 158,817) against Shankar Dev of JNP party who was the runner up (53,409 votes). He became its youngest member.

In 1984 Suryawanshi defeated Rajendra Verma of BJP with 59,615 votes (total votes 1,79,836).

He won the 1989 elections with a margin of 38,947 votes (total votes being 1,77,828) against Prabhudev Kalmath IND.

Suryawanshi contested as a Congress candidate in the 2004 general elections, but was defeated by Ramachandra Veerappa by a margin of 23,539 votes. Suryawanshi received 289,217 votes. In that same year, Ramachandra Veerappa died and a by-election was held. Veerappa's son Basawraj Veerappa stood against Suryawanshi and lost by 13,470 votes, giving him a 4th term.

Suryawanshi appealed to Prime Minister Manmohan Singh to release additional funds for the completion of work on the Bidar-Gulbarga railway line. Suryawanshi and the District Congress Committee president Basavaraj Bulla noted that Bidar was not connected to Bangalore and other districts of the State because of lack of railway links. Trains from Bangalore have to pass through Andhra to reach Bidar.

=== Positions held ===
- 1980: Elected as a Member of Parliament to the 7th Lok Sabha Congress (1st term)
- 1984: Re-elected as a Member of Parliament to 8th Lok Sabha Congress (2nd term)
- 1982-84: Member, Committee on the Welfare of Scheduled Castes and Scheduled Tribes
- 1985-87: Member, Consultative Committee, Ministries of Industry, Commerce and Petroleum
- 1988-89: Member, Business Advisory Committee
- 1989: Re-elected as a Member of Parliament to 9th Lok Sabha Congress (3rd term)
- 1990: Member of Parliament along with member, Committee on Official Language and Consultative Committee, Ministry of Railways
- 2004: Re-elected as a Member of Parliament to 14th Lok Sabha Congress (4th term). Also a Member, Committee on Chemicals and Fertilizers and Consultative Committee, Ministry of Finance
- 2007 5 Aug. Member, Committee on Chemicals & Fertilizers
- 2007 7 Aug. Member, Committee on MPLADS

== Personal life ==
He married Sushila Suryawanshi. The couple has three sons (Sanjay, Vijay, Ajay), one daughter (Indira), a daughter-in-law (Priyanka), and a grandson (Ayush).
