= Sagar Khandre =

Indian politician

Sagar Eshwar Khandre
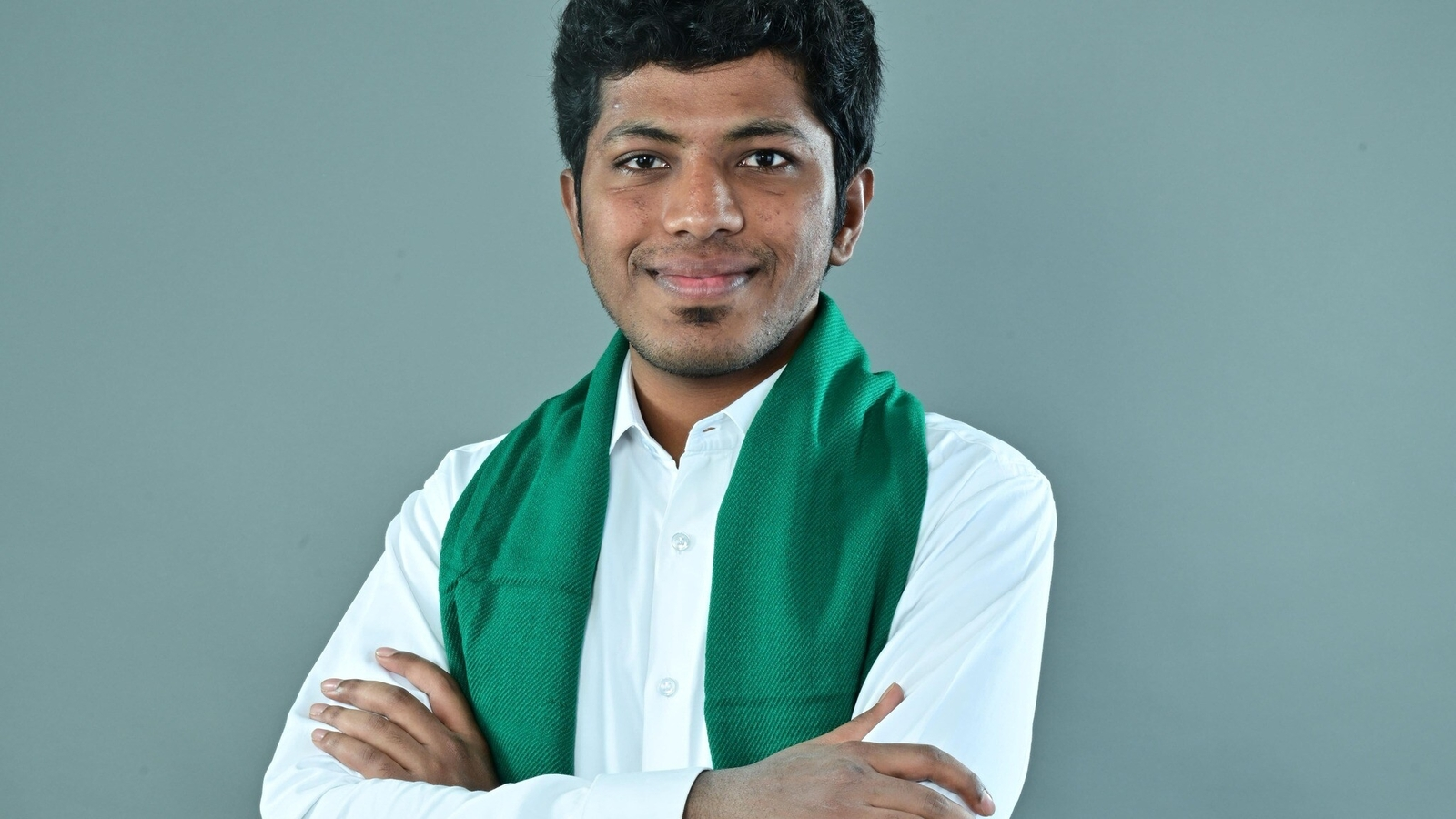
- Sagar Khandre in 2024

Member of Parliament, Lok Sabha
- Incumbent
- Assumed office 4 June 2024
- Preceded by: Bhagwanth Khuba
- Constituency: Bidar Lok Sabha constituency

National Students' Union of India State General Secretary of Karnataka
- Incumbent
- Assumed office 22 September 2023
- President: Kirti Ganesh

Personal details
- Born: Sagar Eshwar Khandre; 29 December 1997 (age 28) Bengaluru
- Party: Indian National Congress
- Parent: Eshwara Khandre (father)
- Relatives: Bheemanna Khandre (grandfather)
- Positions Held: 26 September 2024–present: Member of Committee on Water Resources

Sagar Eshwar Khandre is an Indian politician from Bhalki, Karnataka. He was elected as a Member of Parliament from Bidar Lok Sabha constituency. He belongs to the Indian National Congress. He holds the record for being the youngest Member of Parliament from Karnataka.
