= Prakash Khandre =

Indian politician

Member of the Karnataka Legislative Assembly
- In office 1999–2008
- Preceded by: Vijaykumar Bheemanna Khandre
- Succeeded by: Eshwara Khandre

Personal details
- Party: Bharatiya Janata Party

Prakash Khandre is an Indian politician served as Member of the Karnataka Legislative Assembly from Bhalki Assembly constituency 1999 to 2004 and again 2004 to 2008. He was the candidate of 2023 Karnataka Legislative Assembly from Bhalki Assembly constituency and he defeated by Congress Candidate Eshwara Khandre. He is a member of the Bharatiya Janata Party in 2016 Karnataka bypolls Candidate from Bhalki Assembly constituency. He also candidate for Member of legislative council (MLC) in 2021 from Bharatiya Janata Party.
