= Ramchandra Veerappa =

Indian politician

Member of the Lok Sabha from Bidar
- In office 1962–1971
- Preceded by: Seat did not exist. See Gulbarga
- Succeeded by: Shankar Dev
- In office 1991–2004
- Preceded by: Narsingrao Suryawanshi
- Succeeded by: Narsingrao Suryawanshi

Member of the Mysuru State Legislative Council
- In office 1948–1952

Member of the Mysuru State Legislative Assembly
- In office 1957–1962
- Constituency: Aland

Member of the Karnataka Legislative Assembly
- In office 1980–1985

Member of the Bidar Municipal Council
- In office 1947–1948

Vice President of the Bidar District Congress Committee
- In office 1962–1967

Member of the Congress Committee
- In office 1962–1984

Vice President of the all India schedule Castes (SC) cell of Bharatiya Janata Party
- In office 1991–1994

Personal details
- Born: 1 January 1908 Humnabad
- Died: 18 July 2004 (aged 96) Hyderabad
- Party: Bharatiya Janata Party
- Other political affiliations: Indian National Congress (Organisation); Indian National Congress; Janata Party
- Spouse: Shankaramma Ramchandra
- Children: 2 sons and 4 daughters
- As of 23 September, 2011

Ramchandra Veerappa (1 January 1908 – 18 July 2004) was an Indian veteran politician who represented Bidar constituency in the Lok Sabha from 1962 to 1971 and from 1991 to 2004. He was a member of the Karnataka Legislative Council from 1948 to 1952.

In 1947, he was elected to the Municipal Council, Bidar. He was elected from Bidar to Lok Sabha in 1962 and 1967 as member of Congress. He joined Congress (O) when the party split in 1969, and lost from Bidar in 1971 and 1977. Later he joined BJP and was elected to Lok Sabha from Bidar five times, the last in 2004 at the age of 95. While campaigning in 2004, he said he hoped to contest five years later at the age of 100. He never went to school but learned to read and write in his native Kannada. He was also fluent at Deccani Urdu, Hindi, and Marathi. He said he rarely spoke in Lok Sabha because he was not much familiar with English.

He was a dalit. He married thrice. His first wife died childless. He separated from his second wife decades after they had married, and picked up a third wife in his 60s. In all, he had nine children.

He died on 18 Jul 2004 at Hyderabad Hospital due to kidney dysfunction at the age of 96.
