= Aurad Town Panchayath =

Coordinates: 18.25°N 77.43°E

Type
- Type: Town Panchayath

History
- Founded: 1970

Leadership
- President: Sarubai Ghule,
- Vice President: Radhabai Narote
- Town Panchayath Chief Officer: Swamidas

Structure
- Seats: 20
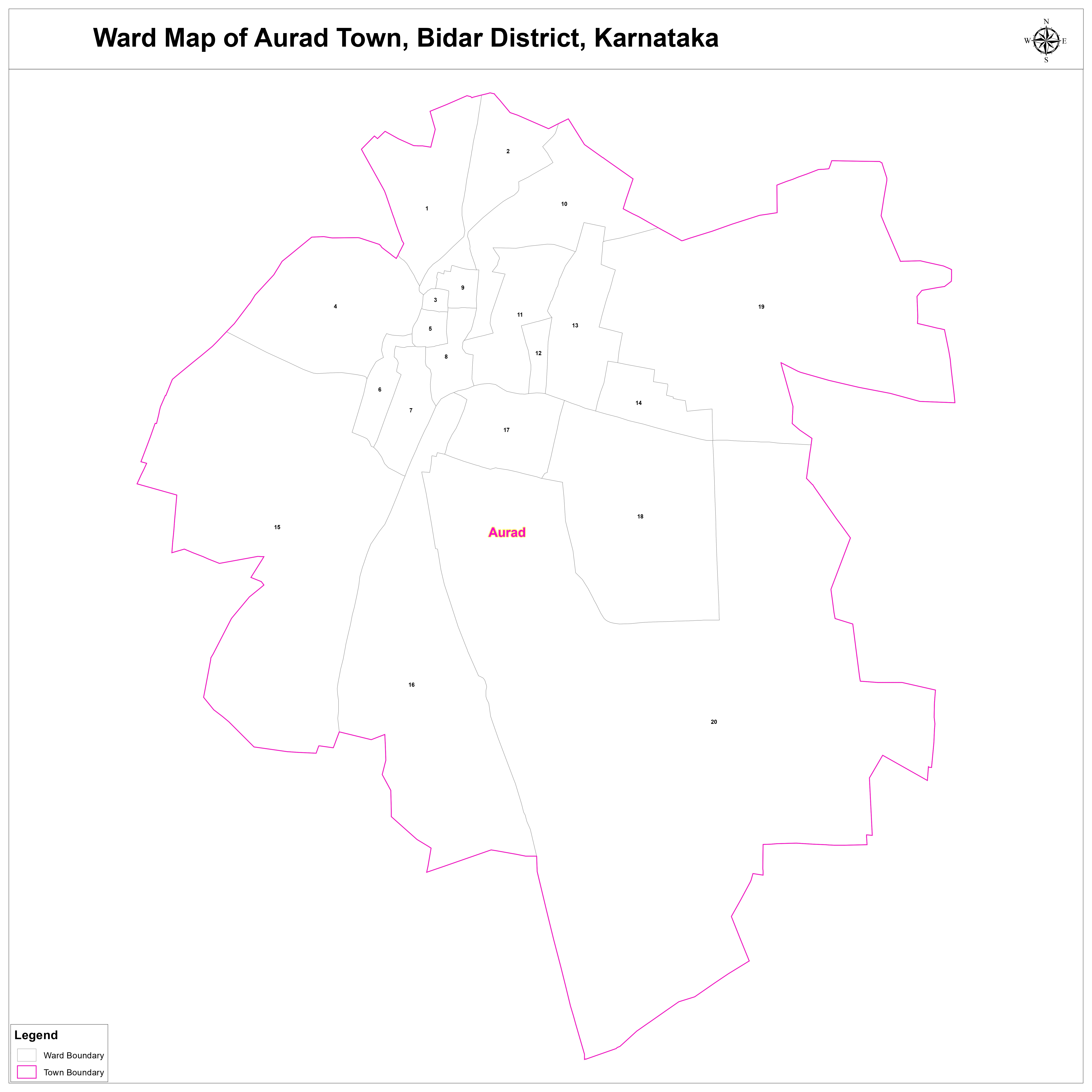
- Political groups: BJP: 10 seats INC: 6 seats Independents: 2 seats
- Length of term: 5 years
- Authority: Karnataka Municipalities Act, 1964

Elections
- Last election: 29 May 2019
- Next election: 2024 (pending)

Meeting place
- New Town Panchayath Office, Near Taluka Sub Jail, NH-161A, Aurad-585326

Website
- auradtown.mrc.gov.in

Constitution
- Constitution of India

Aurad Town Panchayath is a civic body of Aurad in the Bidar district of the Indian state of Karnataka with a population of 24,376
