= Umesh Bhat Bhavikeri =

Indian politician (died 2019)

MLA of Ankola
- In office 1989–1994
- Preceded by: Ajjibal G. S. Hegde
- Succeeded by: Vishwashwar Hegde Kageri

Personal details
- Born: 1946/47 Bhavikeri
- Died: 13 August 2019 Bangalore
- Party: Indian National Congress
- Spouse: Savita Umesh Bhat
- Children: Shankaranand Bhat
- Education: GC college Ankola

Umesh Bhat Bhavikeri was an Indian politician belonging to Indian National Congress. He was elected as a member of Karnataka Legislative Assembly from Ankola in 1989. He also served as the Chairman of Lok Shiksha Trust. It publishes a Kannada newspaper the Samyukta Karnataka.

== Position held ==
#	From	To	Position
1.	1989	1994	MLA from Ankola, Karnataka
2.			Chairman of Lok Shiksha Trust

== Death ==
On 13 August 2019, he died of a heart attack in Bengaluru at the age of 72.
