= PDA College of Engineering =

Coordinates: 17°18′52.44″N 76°50′3.49″E

Poojya Doddappa Appa College of Engineering
- Type: Public
- Established: 1958
- Founder: Mahadevappa Rampure
- Affiliations: VTU Belgaum
- Undergraduates: 13 Courses
- Postgraduates: 10 Courses
- Location: Kalaburagi, Karnataka, India
- Campus: Urban
- Website: https://pdacek.ac.in/

Poojya Doddappa Appa College of Engineering, Gulbarga was founded in the year 1958 by the Hyderabad Karnataka Education society.

The college is affiliated to Visvesvaraya Technological University and approved by AICTE. It is the first college to start Ceramics and Cement Technology course in South India and Electronics and Communication department in Karnataka.

Initial intake was 120 with degree offering in civil, mechanical and electrical now it offers 13 Bachelor with 980 intake, 10 Master with 193 intake and 7 Research Programmes in the various specialties of Engineering.

A cyber security programme was started in October 2025.

== See also ==
- Education in India
- Literacy in India
- Degrees in India
