= Aurad =

- Town
- Aurad (B)
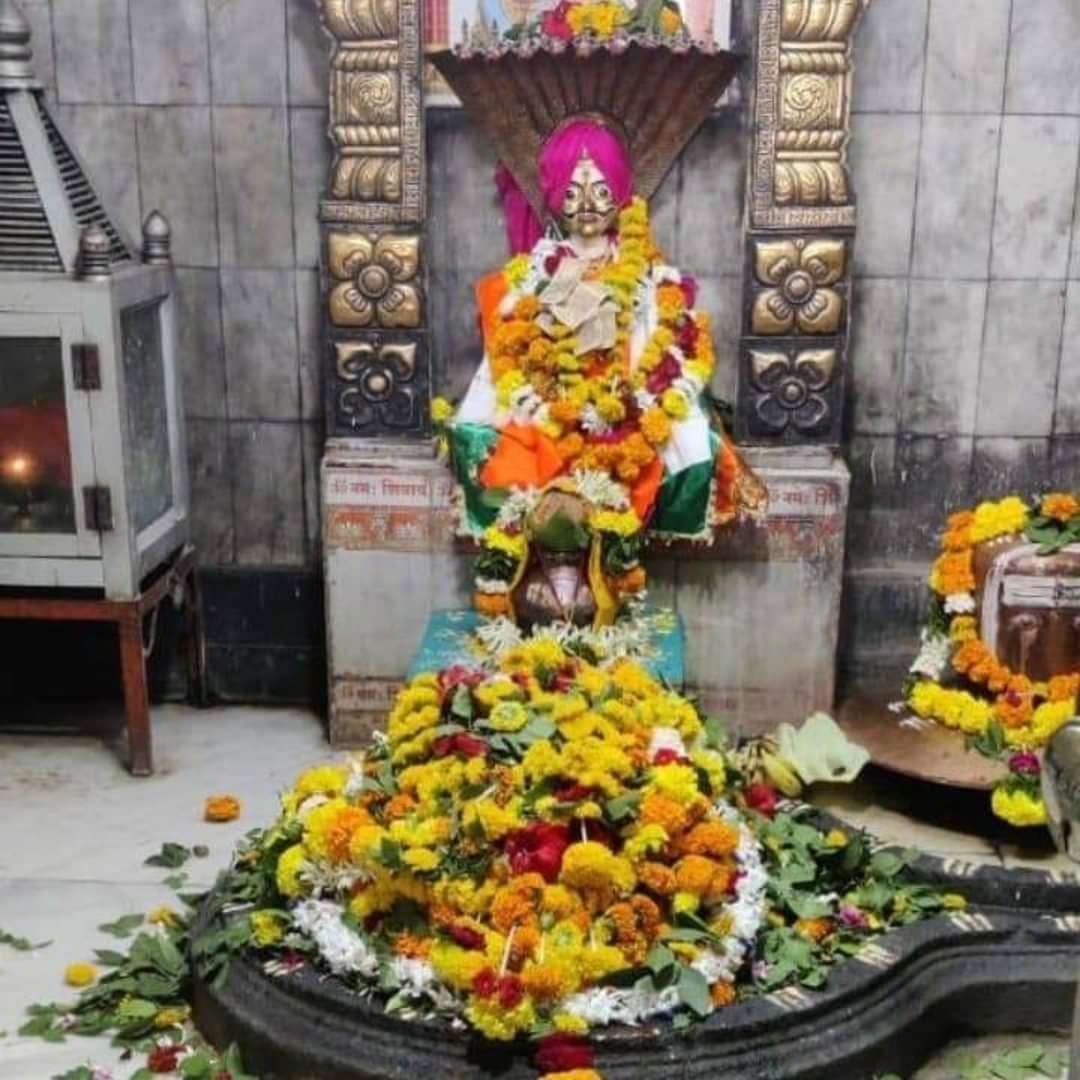
- Sri Amareshwar Temple, Aurad
- Etymology: Vikhyātanagaravaravāḍi
- Interactive map of Aurad
- Location in Karnataka, India Aurad (India) Aurad (Asia)
- Coordinates: 18.2548557°N 77.4151663°E
- Country: India
- State: Karnataka
- Region: Kalyana-Karnataka
- Division: Kalaburagi division
- District: Bidar district
- Named for: 10th century Inscriptions

Government
  - Type: Municipal Council
  - Body: Aurad Town Panchayath
  - President of Municipality: Sarubai Vaijinath Ghule
  - Vice President of Municipality: Radhabai Narote
  - Chief Officer of Municipality: Swamidas
  - Member of Legislative Assembly: Prabhu Chauhan (BJP)

Area
  - Town: 66 km^{2} (25 sq mi)
  - Metro: 99.09 km^{2} (38.26 sq mi)
- Elevation: 542 m (1,778 ft)
- Highest elevation: 609.9048 m (2,001.000 ft)

Population (2011)
  - Town: 23,957
  - Density: 360/km^{2} (940/sq mi)
  - Urban: 19,849
  - Rural: 4,108

Language
  - Official: Kannada
- Time zones: UTC+5:30 (IST)
- UTC+5:30 (IST summer)
- PIN Code: 585326
- STD Code: 08485
- Vehicle registration: KA 38
- Assembly (Vidhan Sabha) constituency: Aurad
- Lok Sabha constituency: Bidar
- State Highways: SH 15; SH 34
- Major National Highway: NH 161A
- Website: auradtown.mrc.gov.in

Aurad is a town and municipal council in the Bidar district of the Kalyana-Karnataka region in Indian state of Karnataka. It passes through the National Highway 161A. It is 42 kilometres (26 mi) from the district headquarters Bidar.

== Geography ==
Aurad is located at 18.25°N 77.43°E. It has an average elevation of 542 metres (1,778 ft). Aurad is 840 kilometres (520 mi) from Bengaluru and 42 kilometres (26 mi) from District Headquarters Bidar. The area of Aurad taluka is 1,227.20 km^{2} having 6 circles, 149 villages and 177 thandas. It is located 542–610 metres (1,778–2,001 ft) above sea level. Aurad is the largest of the five talukas in Bidar District.

=== River ===
Manjra is the tributary of Godavari, which enters into Aurad at Horandi and flows as taluka boundary through Sonal, Kalgapur, Hulsur, Khed, Halalli, Nidoda, Nittur, Babli, Bachepalli. Ladha, Koutha(B), Khanapur and at the end it leaves Aurad at Kandgul village.

=== Climate ===
The climate is generally dry and healthy. The average rainfall of the taluka is 840 mm. Average number of rainy days are about 51 days. Though the climate is dry throughout the year, temperatures can become as high as 40-43 °C during the summer. Temperatures in the town during winter can get as low as 10-15 °C.

== Demographics ==
As of 2011 Indian Census, Aurad town panchayat had a total population of 19,849, of which 10,058 were males and 9,791 were females. Population within the age group of 0 to 6 years was 2,769. The total number of literates in Aurad was 12,226, which constituted 61.6% of the population with male literacy of 68.7% and female literacy of 54.3%. The effective literacy rate of 7+ population of Aurad was 71.6%, of which male literacy rate was 79.8% and female literacy rate was 63.2%. The Scheduled Castes and Scheduled Tribes population was 6,066 and 1,207 respectively. Aurad had 3810 households in 2011.

Aurad suburb had a population of 4,108, of which 2,056 were males and 2,052 were females, with 494 under the age of seven.

== Places of interest ==
- Sri Amareshwar Temple in the center of the town and is estimated to be from the 10th century. The Amareshwar Jaatra is held here every year during Maha Shivratri. Thousands of devotees visit to seek the blessings of the Lord and get sanctified.

== Notable people ==
- Bhagwanth Khuba — politician and former Minister of State for Chemicals and Fertilizers, New and Renewable Energy in the Government of India.
- Narsingrao Suryawanshi — former member of Parliament from Bidar Lok Sabha constituency.
- Vaijnath Patil, member of the Indian National Congress
- Prabhu Chauhan — member of the Karnataka Legislative Assembly and former minister in government of Karnataka
