= Gulbarga University =

Public university in Karnataka, India

Gulbarga University ಗುಲ್ಬರ್ಗಾ ವಿಶ್ವವಿದ್ಯಾಲಯ
- Motto: ವಿದ್ಯೆಯೇ ಅಮೃತ
- Motto in English: Education is Nector
- Type: Public university
- Established: 10 September 1980; 46 years ago
- Academic affiliations: UGC, NAAC
- Chancellor: Governor of Karnataka
- Vice-Chancellor: Gooru Sreeramulu
- Students: 3000 to 3500 (Undergraduate & Postgraduate both)
- Location: Sedam Road, Jnana Ganga, Kalaburagi, Karnataka, India 585106; 17°18′46.62″N 76°52′27.32″E
- Campus: Rural
- Website: gug.ac.in

Gulbarga University is a public university located in Kalaburagi, Karnataka, India. The university is recognized by University Grants Commission and accredited by National Assessment and Accreditation Council (NAAC). In 2016, Gulbarga university was awarded 'B' grade by NAAC.

== History ==
Gulbarga University was established in 1980 by an Act of Karnataka State. Earlier it was a post-graduate centre of Karnatak University, Dharwad.

== Academics ==
The main campus of Gulbarga University is spread over 860 acres and situated 6 Kilometre east of Kalaburagi city. The university has more than 45 post-graduate and post-graduate diploma programmes at 37 study centres.

== Access ==
Kalaburagi is well connected by air, railway lines and roads. It is an important rail head on the Central Southern Railway zone line connecting to Bangalore, Mumbai, Delhi and Hyderabad.

It is well connected by National Highways with Bangalore and Hyderabad, which are 610 kilometres (380 mi) and 225 kilometres (140 mi) away respectively, from Kalaburagi. Road distances to other cities within the state are: Basavakalyan-80 kilometres (50 mi), Bidar -120 kilometres (75 mi), Raichur - 155 kilometres (96 mi) and Bijapur - 160 kilometres (99 mi).

Kalaburagi Airport is the nearest airport.
