= Bhalki =

- Town
- Interactive map of Bhalki
- Location in Karnataka, India
- Coordinates: 18.05°N 77.21°E
- Country: India
- State: Karnataka
- District: Bidar
- Municipal Council constituted: 1953
- Named for: Bhallunke

Government
  - Type: Town Municipal Council
  - Body: Bhalki Municipal Council
  - President of Town Municipal Council: Mr. Basavaraj Vanke
  - Chief Officer: Mr. Sangamesh Karabhari

Area
  - Total: 8 km^{2} (3.1 sq mi)
- Elevation: 587 m (1,926 ft)

Population (2011)
  - Total: 78,974
  - Density: 9,900/km^{2} (26,000/sq mi)
- Demonym: Bhalkinavaru

Languages
  - Official: Kannada
- Time zone: UTC+5:30 (IST)
- PIN: 585328
- Telephone code: 91 08484
- Vehicle registration: KA-39
- Website: www.bhalkitown.mrc.gov.in

Bhalki or Bhālki is a town in Bidar district in the Indian state of Karnataka. It is located 30 km from Bidar. It is the headquarters of Bhalki taluka panchayat. It is well connected by roadways and railways. The Karanja River, one of the main rivers of Bidar district, flows through Bhalki taluka.

== History ==
First mention of the town was made as "Bhallunke" in the vachanas of 12th century sharanas. The sharana Kumbara Gundaiah was from Bhalki who was part of Bhakthi movement.

=== The 1857 War of Independence ===
Bhalki's importance in the 1857 war is played out at the very end of the war, when one of Tatya Tope's followers is arrested and tried by the Nizam, in 1867. This person was Madho Rao, alias Rama Rao, the nephew of Shrimant Shahu Chatrapati, the Maharaja of Satara. He was also known as Jung Bahadur, as referred by Sir Richard Temple in his diaries. During a search, officials discovered that Jung Bahadur carried several papers in English and Marathi, translation of a deed of agreement and a seal saying he was the `Chatrapati of Satara'.

Jung Bahadur raised an army of over 1500 people in and around the forests of Bhalki, spending up to 20,000 Rupees. and gave 200 Rupees to his follower Deva Rao to recruit 500 soldiers. A jamadar got a monthly salary of 40 Rupees, a sepoy 30 Rupees and a sawar 10 Rupees. He recruited soldiers in the villages issuing them Kaulnamas or appointment letters, in which he asked young men to join him in the task of "murdering the British and regaining the lost glory of the Royal family of Satara". Jung Bahadur and his followers moved on foot from village to village, disguised as mendicants.

He caused great damage to the British government, and captured a cantonment area called Ashti in Bidar district. He and his main followers were eventually arrested by two officers of the British resident in Hyderabad state. Their trial however, was conducted by the Nizam’s courts. The Magistrate of the criminal court, Moulvi Nasrullah Khan, completed the trial in less than a month, charging them with "trying to bring about insurrection against the empire".

Jung Bahadur, Bheem Rao, Balakishtayya and Vithoba were sentenced to transportation to life. Jung Bahadur is said to have spent his last days in the Hyderabad prison, where he died. His followers Yeshwanta and Jehangir Ali were sentenced to 14 years of imprisonment. Others like Eshwanna Naikwadi and Vir Peddappa were given minor punishments.

== Geography ==
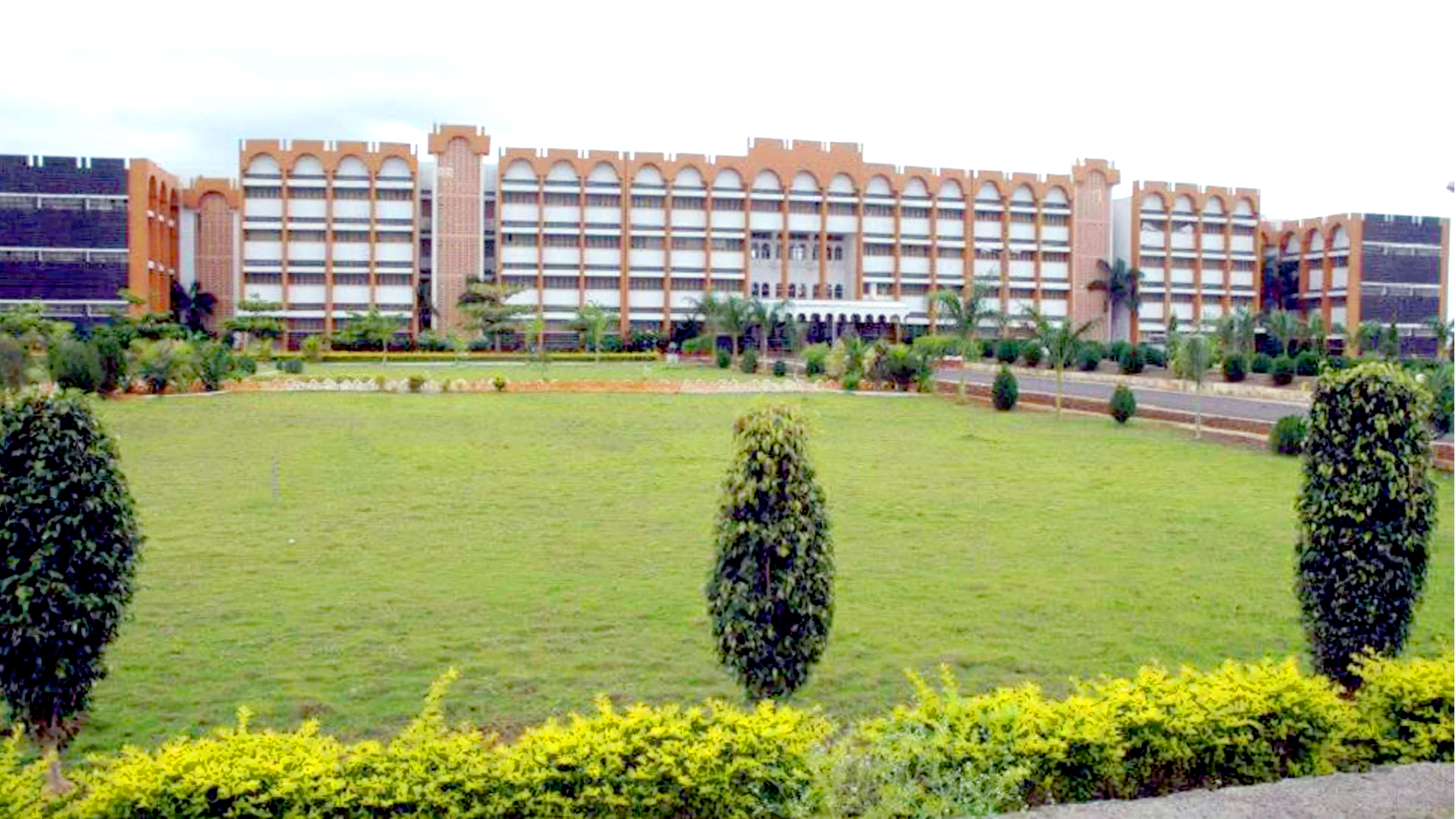
Bkit College Bhalki

Bhalki is located at 18.03°N 77.22°E. It has an average elevation of 587 metres (1925 feet).

== Demographics ==
Religions in Bhalki
Religion	Percent
Hindu	55.4%
Muslim	38.74%
Christians	1.19%
Sikh	0.07%
Buddhist	4.39%
uJain	0.04%
Others†	0.08%
Not Stated	0.09%

As of 2011 India census, Bhalki town has a population of 40,333. Bhalki has literacy rate of 80.34%, higher than the state average of 75.36%; with 87.52% of the males and 72.72% of the females literate. 12.12% of the population is under 6 years of age. Female Sex Ratio is of 945 against state average of 973. Child Sex Ratio in Bhalki is around 974 compared to Karnataka state average of 948. ಕನ್ನಡ language is spoken by the majority of the population. urdu & Dakhini are also spoken by some.

== Interesting places in and around the town ==
Bhalki fort
Located at the edge the old Bhalki town, it hosts a variety of buildings, including the Satyaniketan School, residences, Kumbheshwar (Ganesh) Temple, etc. This fort is locally known as the 'Gadi' (from gad, meaning a fort in Kannada and Marathi). Believed to be built between 1820-1850 by Ramachandra Jadhav and Dhanaji Jadhav, satraps of Jang Bahadur, the black basalt stone and lime mortar seven metre tall fort covers around 18,000 square metres (five acres). The Kumbheshwar (Ganesh) temple is inside the fort. There are open wells inside the fort and a small pond outside it, though all of them have dried up. The Bidar district administration has proposed a plan to preserve and develop the fort, at a proposed cost of Rs.1.25 crores.

=== Bhalkeshwar Temple ===
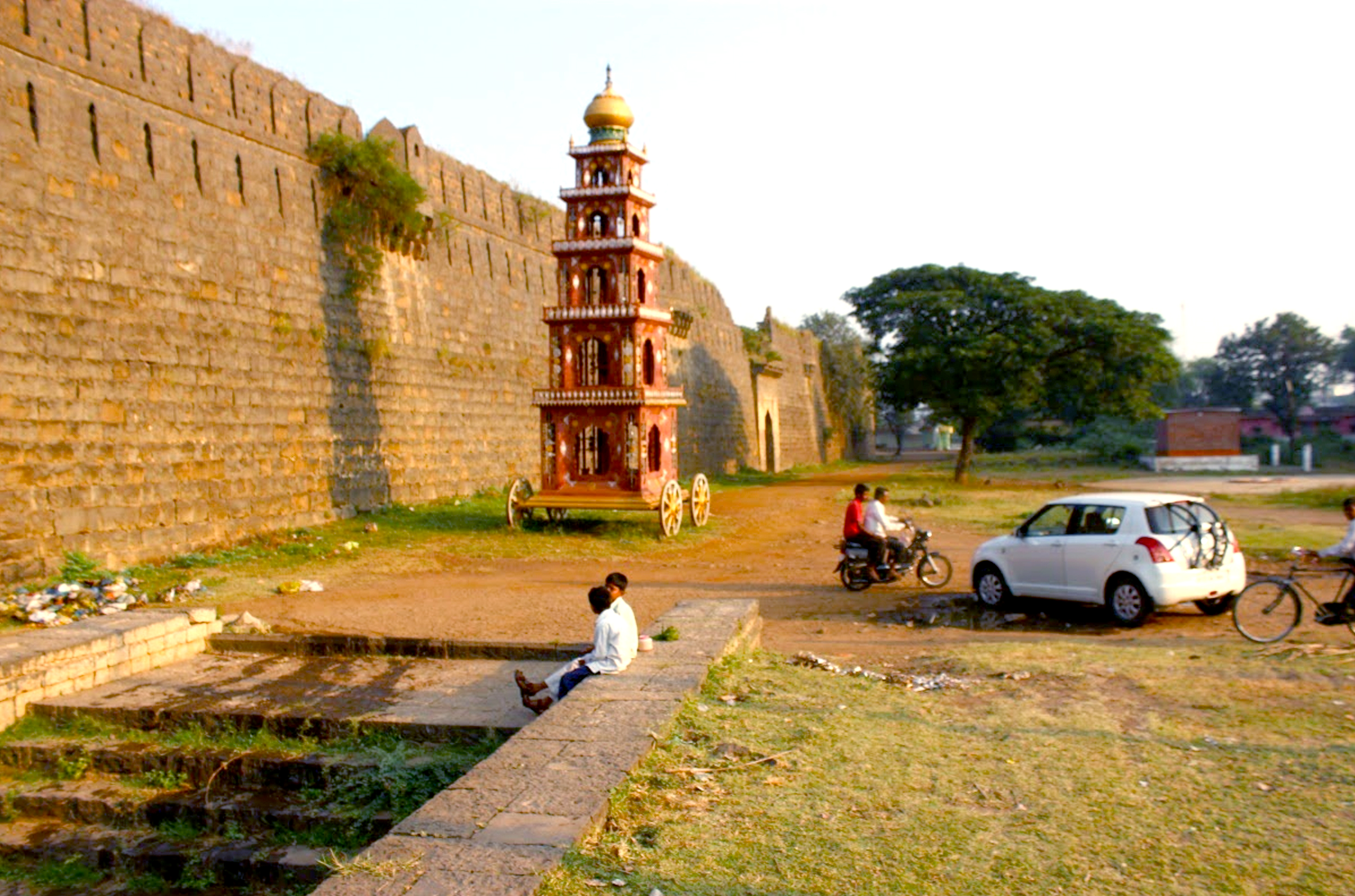
Bhalkeshwara Temple Slide

This temple is close to the fort, and dedicated to Shiva. There is also an adjoining stepped well, which is lined with locally abundant black basalt stones.

=== Ram Temple ===
Also known as Balaji temple, is in the Gunj area of the town. The temple was built in 1945 by the Sant Mahant Shri Premdas Baba and reconstructed under the guidance of the Marwadi Samaj in 1980.
Rameshwara Tekadee
Located on a hill (TekaDee - hill in Marathi) a couple of kilometres north-east of the new town centre, this is a historical fort-like structure offering a panoramic view of the surrounding plains. It also hosts a temple.

=== Old Town ===
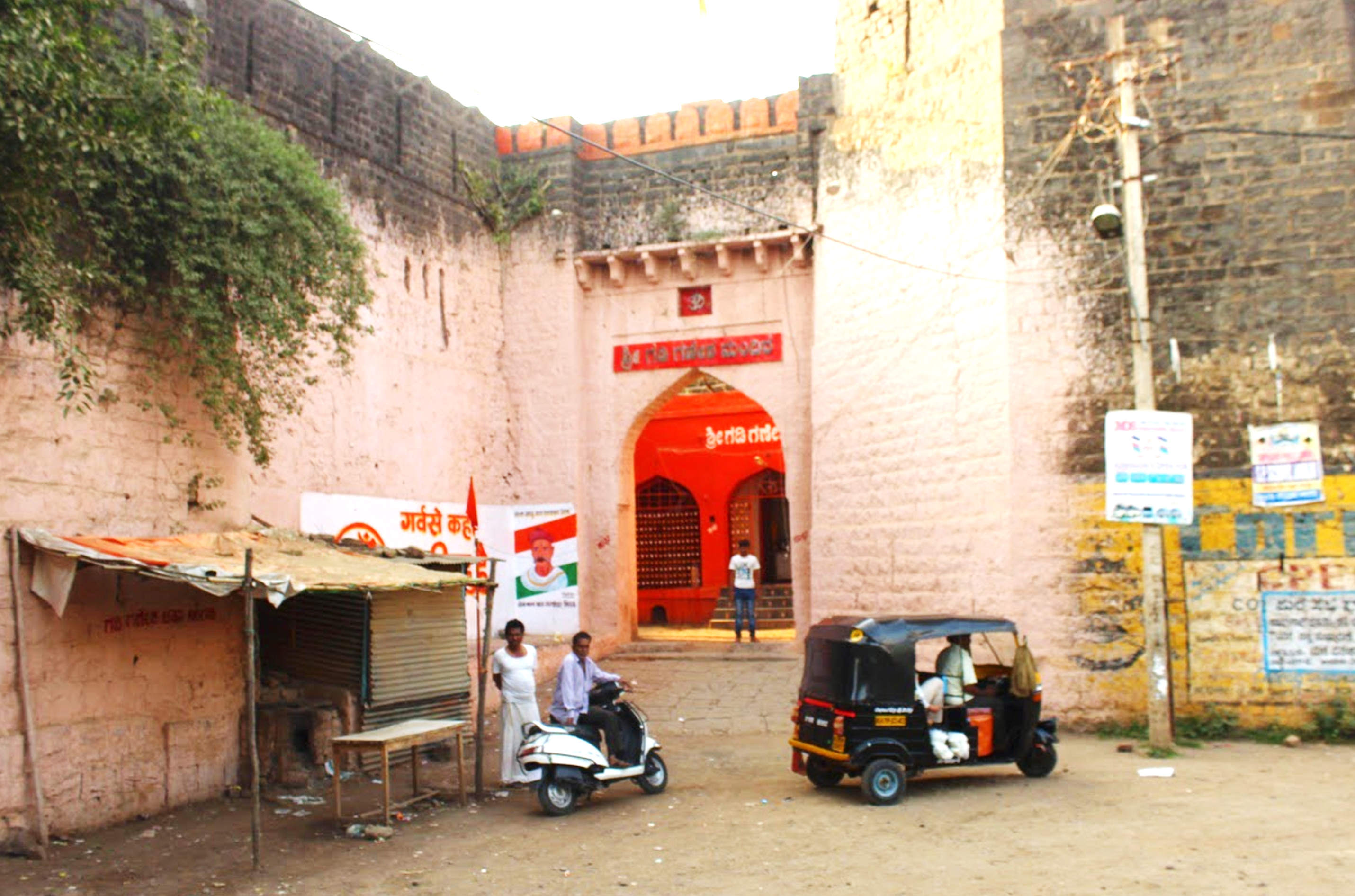
Bhalki Old Town Area

This is the historic Bhalki town protected by the fort. The old town is a typical example of a medieval Deccan fortified town, with old style residential houses, albeit now modified to suit modern needs. The historic Hiremath Samsthan, started by Sri Chennabasava Pattadevaru, is also located in the old town.

=== Bhalki Tank ===
An artificial lake created for rainwater harvesting, and a view point for some spectacular winter sunsets.
Bhatambra Fort

Bhatambra is famous for the 12th century fort located in the village. The fort is in good condition. Bhatambra is 12 km from Bhalki.

== Religious places ==
Sri Mailar Mallanna Temple is a Hindu temple dedicated to the god Khandoba (also known as Mailar Mallanna and a form of the god Shiva, in Mailar or Khanapur village). It is situated on the Bidar-Udgir Road, 15 km from Bidar.

== Notable people ==
- Bheemanna Khandre (former Minister & MLA)
- Eshwara Khandre (State Minister Karnataka 2023–present & MLA)
- Sagar Khandre (Bidar MP 2024–present)
- Vijaykumar Khandre (former MLA)
- Prakash Khandre (former MLA)

== See also ==
- Aurad
- Basavakalyan
- Bhatambra
- Bidar
- Humnabad
