= Vijaykumar Khandre =

Indian physician and politician (died 2019)

Member of the Karnataka Legislative Assembly
- In office 1989–1999
- Preceded by: Kalyanrao Sangappa Molakere
- Succeeded by: Prakash Khandre
- Constituency: Bhalki

Personal details
- Born: 1958 Bhalki
- Died: 29 April 2019 (aged 60–61) Hyderabad
- Party: Indian National Congress (1994–2019)
- Other political affiliations: Independent (1989–1994)
- Children: 2
- Parent: Bheemanna Khandre (father)

Vijaykumar Bheemanna Khandre was an Indian physician and politician belonging to Indian National Congress. He was elected as a member of Karnataka Legislative Assembly from Bhalki in 1989 and 1994. His father Bheemanna Khandre was a Minister of Karnataka Government and his younger brother Eshwara Khandre is serving as Working President of Karnataka Pradesh Congress Committee. He died of cardiac arrest on 29 April 2019 at the age of 60.
