= Bidar Lok Sabha constituency =

Lok Sabha Constituency in Karnataka, India

Coordinates: 17.91°N 77.50°E

Bidar
- Lok Sabha constituency
- Bidar Lok Sabha constituency map

Constituency details
- Country: India
- Region: South India
- State: Karnataka
- Assembly constituencies: Chincholi; Aland; Basavakalyan; Humnabad; Bidar South; Bidar; Bhalki; Aurad
- Established: 1952 (74 years ago)
- Total electors: 18,92,962 (as per 2024)
- Reservation: None

Member of Parliament
- 18th Lok Sabha
- Incumbent Sagar Khandre
- Party: Indian National Congress
- Elected year: 2024
- Preceded by: Bhagwanth Khuba

Bidar Lok Sabha constituency is one of the 28 Lok Sabha (parliamentary) constituencies in Karnataka state in India. This constituency came into existence in 1962. It was reserved for the candidates belonging to the Scheduled castes till 2008. It comprises the entire Bidar district and part of Kalaburagi district.

== List of Vidhan Sabha segments ==
Bidar Lok Sabha constituency presently comprises the following eight Legislative Assembly segments:

| No | Name | District | Member | Party | Party Leading (in 2024) |
|---|---|---|---|---|---|
| 42 | Chincholi (SC) | Kalaburagi | Avinash Umesh Jadhav | BJP | INC |
| 46 | Aland | Kalaburagi | B. R. Patil | INC | BJP |
| 47 | Basavakalyan | Bidar | Sharanu Salagar | BJP | INC |
| 48 | Humnabad | Bidar | Siddu Patil | BJP | INC |
| 49 | Bidar South | Bidar | Shailendra Beldale | BJP | INC |
| 50 | Bidar | Bidar | Rahim Khan | INC | INC |
| 51 | Bhalki | Bidar | Eshwara Khandre | INC | INC |
| 52 | Aurad (SC) | Bidar | Prabhu Chauhan | BJP | INC |

== Members of Lok Sabha ==
| Year | Member | Party |
|---|---|---|
| 1952 | Shaukatullah Shah Ansari | Indian National Congress |
1957 : Seat did not exist
| 1962 | Ramchandra Veerappa | Indian National Congress |
| 1967 | Ramchandra Veerappa | Indian National Congress |
| 1971 | Shanker Dev | Indian National Congress |
| 1977 | Shanker Dev | Indian National Congress |
| 1980 | Narsingrao Suryawanshi | Indian National Congress (I) |
| 1984 | Narsingrao Suryawanshi | Indian National Congress |
| 1989 | Narsingrao Suryawanshi | Indian National Congress |
| 1991 | Ramchandra Veerappa | Bharatiya Janata Party |
| 1996 | Ramchandra Veerappa | Bharatiya Janata Party |
| 1998 | Ramchandra Veerappa | Bharatiya Janata Party |
| 1999 | Ramchandra Veerappa | Bharatiya Janata Party |
| 2004 | Ramchandra Veerappa | Bharatiya Janata Party |
| 2004^ | Narsingrao Suryawanshi | Indian National Congress |
| 2009 | Dharam Singh | Indian National Congress |
| 2014 | Bhagwanth Khuba | Bharatiya Janata Party |
| 2019 | Bhagwanth Khuba | Bharatiya Janata Party |
| 2024 | Sagar Eshwar Khandre | Indian National Congress |

- ^ Bye-election

== Election results ==
=== General Election 2024 ===
2024 Indian general election: Bidar
| Party | Candidate | Votes | % | ±% |
|---|---|---|---|---|
| INC | Sagar Eshwar Khandre | 666,317 | 53.63 | |
| BJP | Bhagwanth Khuba | 5,37,442 | 43.26 | |
| NOTA | None of the above | 4,686 | 0.38 | |
| Majority | | 1,28,875 | 10.37 | |
| Turnout | | 12,43,057 | 65.62 | +2.62 |
| INC gain from BJP | | Swing | | |

=== 2019 ===
2019 Indian general elections: Bidar
| Party | Candidate | Votes | % | ±% |
|---|---|---|---|---|
| BJP | Bhagwanth Khuba | 585,471 | 52.41 | +4.54 |
| INC | Eshwara Khandre | 4,68,637 | 41.95 | +3.69 |
| BSP | Baba Bukhari | 15,188 | 1.36 | |
| IND. | Ravikant. K. Hugar Vakil | 5,748 | 0.51 | |
| Majority | | 1,16,834 | 10.46 | |
| Turnout | | 11,18,255 | 63.00 | +2.81 |
| BJP hold | | Swing | | |

=== 2014 Elections ===
2014 Indian general elections: Bidar
| Party | Candidate | Votes | % | ±% |
|---|---|---|---|---|
| BJP | Bhagwanth Khuba | 459,260 | 47.87 | |
| INC | N. Dharam Singh | 3,67,068 | 38.26 | |
| JD(S) | Bandeppa Khasempur | 58,728 | 6.12 | |
| BSP | Shankar Bhayya | 15,079 | 1.57 | |
| Majority | | 92,222 | 9.61 | |
| Turnout | | 9.63,206 | 60.16 | |
| BJP gain from INC | | Swing | | |

=== 2004 Lok Sabha Elections ===
- Ramchandra Veerappa (BJP) : 312,838 votes (Died in 2004)
- Narsingrao Hulla Suryawanshi (INC) : 289,217

==== 2004 bye-election ====
- Narsingrao Hulla Suryawanshi (INC) : 196,917 votes
- Basawraj Ramchandra Veerappa (BJP) : 183,447 (Son of Ramchandra Veerappa)

=== 1962 Elections ===
- Ramachander Veerappa (INC) 95,691 votes
- B. Shamsunder (PSP) 41,389 votes
