= Kamalpur =

Kamalpur may refer to:

== India ==
=== Assam ===
- Kamalpur, Assam, a town in Kamrup district, Assam
  - Kamalpur, Assam Assembly constituency, legislative constituency in Assam

=== Gujarat ===
- Kamalpur, Gujarat, a town and former princely state in Kathiawar Agency, Gujarat
- Kamalpur, Surendranagar, a village in Dasada tehsil of Surendranagar district

=== Punjab ===
- Kamalpur, Bhulath, a village in Bhulath Tehsil in Kapurthala district
- Kamalpur, Sultanpur Lodhi, a village in Sultanpur Lodhi in Kapurthala district
- Kamalpur, Jalandhar, a village in Shankot tehsil in Jalandhar district
- Kamalpur, Rupnagar, a village in Chamkaur Sahib tehsil in Rupnagar district

=== Tripura ===
- Kamalpur, Tripura, a town and a nagar panchayat in Dhalai district, Tripura
  - Kamalpur, Tripura Assembly constituency, the state assembly constituency centered around the town
  - Kamalpur Airport in the above town

=== Uttar Pradesh ===
- Kamalpur, Uttar Pradesh, in Mungra Badshahpur, Jaunpur district
- Kamalpur, Khiron, a village in Raebareli district
- Kamalpur, Rohaniya, a village in Raebareli district
- Kamalpur Baraila, a village in Raebareli district

=== West Bengal ===
- Garh Kamalpur, Purba Medinipur district

=== Madhya Pradesh ===
- Kamalpur, Kalapipal, a gram panchayat in Kalapipal Tehsil in Shajapur district

== Elsewhere ==
- Kamalpur, Nepal
- Kamalpur, Pakistan
- Kamalpur, in Baksiganj Upazila, Jamalpur District, Bangladesh
  - Battle of Kamalpur, Bangladesh Liberation War (1971)
  - Defence of Kamalpur, Bangladesh Liberation War (1971)
- Kamalpur, in Moulvibazar Sadar Upazila, Bangladesh

== See also ==
- Kamalpur Assembly constituency (disambiguation)
- Boria Kamalpur, a village in Rewari mandal of Jatusana Block, Haryana, India
- Kamalapur (disambiguation)
- Kamalpur Musa, a Pathan village in Hazro Tehsil, Attock District, Punjab, Pakistan
- Mohanpur Kamalpur, a village development committee in Siraha District in the Sagarmatha Zone of south-eastern Nepal
- Khowai-Ompi-Kamalpur Baptist Association (KOK), main baptist association of Khowai and Ompi subdivisions of West Tripura and Dhalai districts of Tripura
