= Kamalapura =

Kamalapura may refer to:

- Kamalapura, Vijayanagara, in Vijayanagara district (formerly Bellary district), Karnataka
- Kamalapura, Kalaburagi, Karnataka
  - Kamalapur, Karnataka Assembly constituency

== See also ==
- Kamalapur Assembly constituency (disambiguation)
