= Kamalapuram =

Kamalapur, Kamalapura, or Kamalapuram may refer to several places in India:

== Andhra Pradesh ==
- Kamalapuram, Kadapa district, a village in Kadapa district, Andhra Pradesh, India
- Kamalapuram mandal, a mandal in Kadapa district, Andhra Pradesh, India
- Kamalapuram, Mulugu district, a village in Mulugu district, Andhra Pradesh, India

== Karnataka ==
- Kamalapura, Vijayanagara (also Kamalapuram), a town in Bellary district, Karnataka, India

== Tamil Nadu ==
- Kamalapuram, Dindigul, a village in Dindigul district, Tamil Nadu, India

== Telangana ==
- Kamalapur, Hanamkonda district in Telangana, India
- Kamalapuram, Khammam district, a village in Khammam district, Telangana, India
- Kotha Kamalapuram, a village in Khammam district of Telangana state, India.
