= Kamalapur =

Kamalapur may refer to:

- Kamalapur, a neighbourhood in Dhaka
  - Kamalapur railway station, Dhaka, Bangladesh
  - Kamalapur metro station, a mass rapid transit station of MRT Line 6
  - Kamalapur Multimodal Transport Hub, a proposed infrastructure in Dhaka, Bangladesh
- Kamalapur, Hanumakonda district, Telangana
- Kamalapura, Vijayanagara, in Vijayanagara district (formerly Bellary district), Karnataka
- Kamalapura, Kalaburagi, Karnataka
  - Kamalapur, Karnataka Assembly constituency
- Kamalapur, a town in Comilla District, Bangladesh

== See also ==
- Kamalapur Assembly constituency (disambiguation)
- Kamalpur (disambiguation)
- Kamalapur, in Hooghly
- Kamalapur, Hooghly, in Hooghly district, West bengal
