= Ghatampur, Raebareli =

Ghatampur Ghātampur
- Village
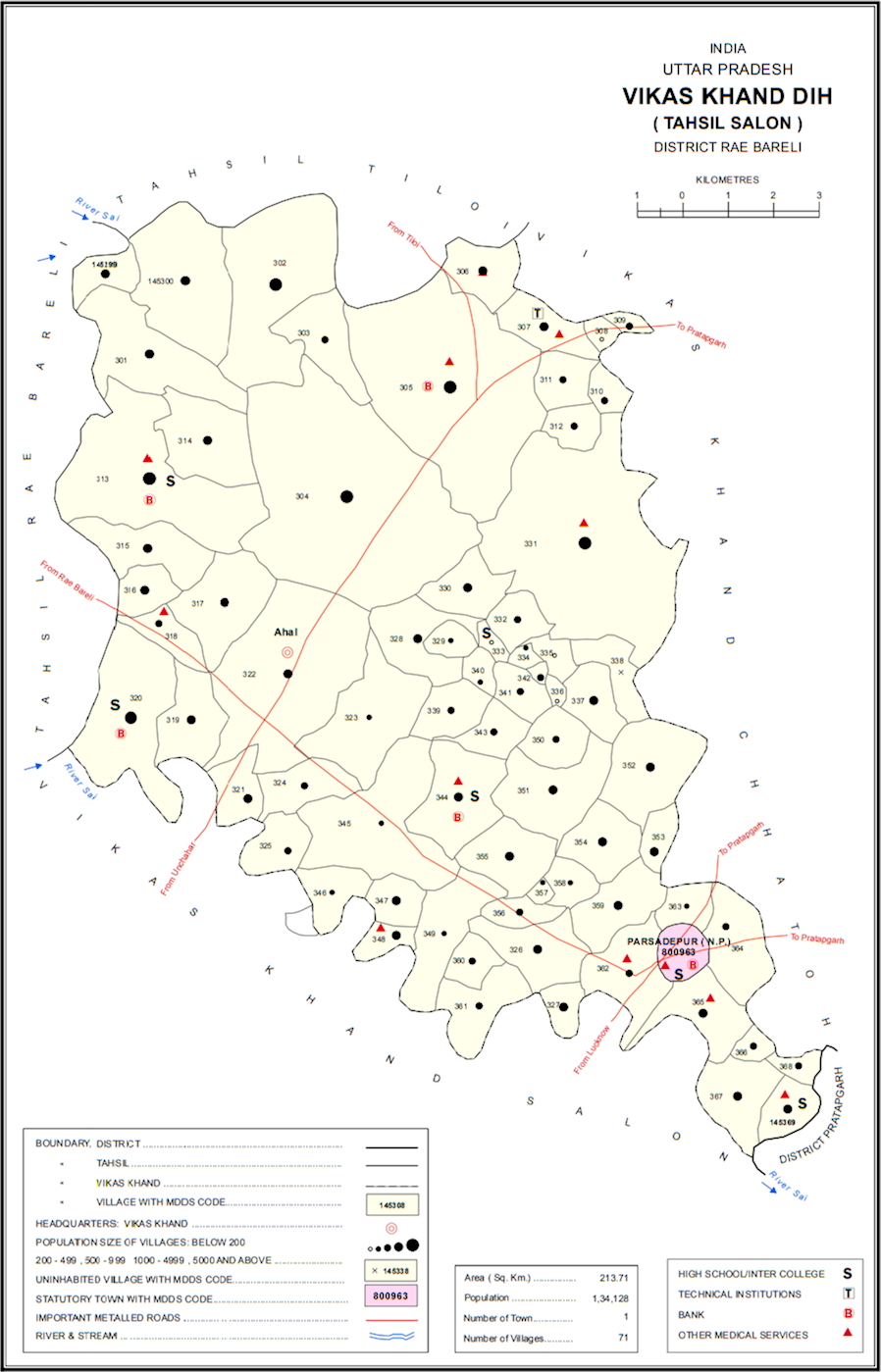
- Map showing Ghatampur (#337) in Dih CD block

- Location in Uttar Pradesh, India
- Coordinates: 26.13144°N 81.478416°E
- Country: India
- State: Uttar Pradesh
- District: Raebareli

Area
  - Total: 1.225 km^{2} (0.473 sq mi)

Population (2011)
  - Total: 1,059
  - Density: 864.5/km^{2} (2,239/sq mi)

Languages
  - Official: Hindi
- Time zone: UTC+5:30 (IST)
- Vehicle registration: UP-35

Ghatampur is a village in Dih block of Rae Bareli district, Uttar Pradesh, India. It is located 29 km from Raebareli, the district headquarters. As of 2011, it has a population of 1,059 people, in 177 households. It has one primary school and no healthcare facilities, and it does not host a permanent market or a weekly haat. It belongs to the nyaya panchayat of Birnawan.

The 1951 census recorded Ghatampur as comprising 1 hamlet, with a total population of 412 people (205 male and 207 female), in 93 households and 92 physical houses. The area of the village was given as 301 acres. 31 residents were literate, 28 male and 3 female. The village was listed as belonging to the pargana of Rokha and the thana of Nasirabad.

The 1961 census recorded Ghatampur as comprising 3 hamlets, with a total population of 482 people (235 male and 247 female), in 108 households and 108 physical houses. The area of the village was given as 301 acres.

The 1981 census recorded Ghatampur as having a population of 607 people, in 160 households, and having an area of 123.03 hectares. The main staple foods were listed as wheat and rice.

The 1991 census recorded Ghatampur as having a total population of 738 people (408 male and 330 female), in 146 households and 146 physical houses. The area of the village was listed as 123 hectares. Members of the 0-6 age group numbered 167, or 19% of the total; this group was 55% male (76) and 45% female (61). Members of scheduled castes made up 17% of the village's population, while no members of scheduled tribes were recorded. The literacy rate of the village was 26% (153 men and 37 women). 301 people were classified as main workers (239 men and 62 women), while 38 people were classified as marginal workers (all women); the remaining 399 residents were non-workers. The breakdown of main workers by employment category was as follows: 146 cultivators (i.e. people who owned or leased their own land); 150 agricultural labourers (i.e. people who worked someone else's land in return for payment); 0 workers in livestock, forestry, fishing, hunting, plantations, orchards, etc.; 0 in mining and quarrying; 2 household industry workers; 0 workers employed in other manufacturing, processing, service, and repair roles; 0 construction workers; 0 employed in trade and commerce; 0 employed in transport, storage, and communications; and 3 in other services.
