= Ahsan Malik =

Pakistan Army officer

Colonel Ahsan Malik SJ SI(M)
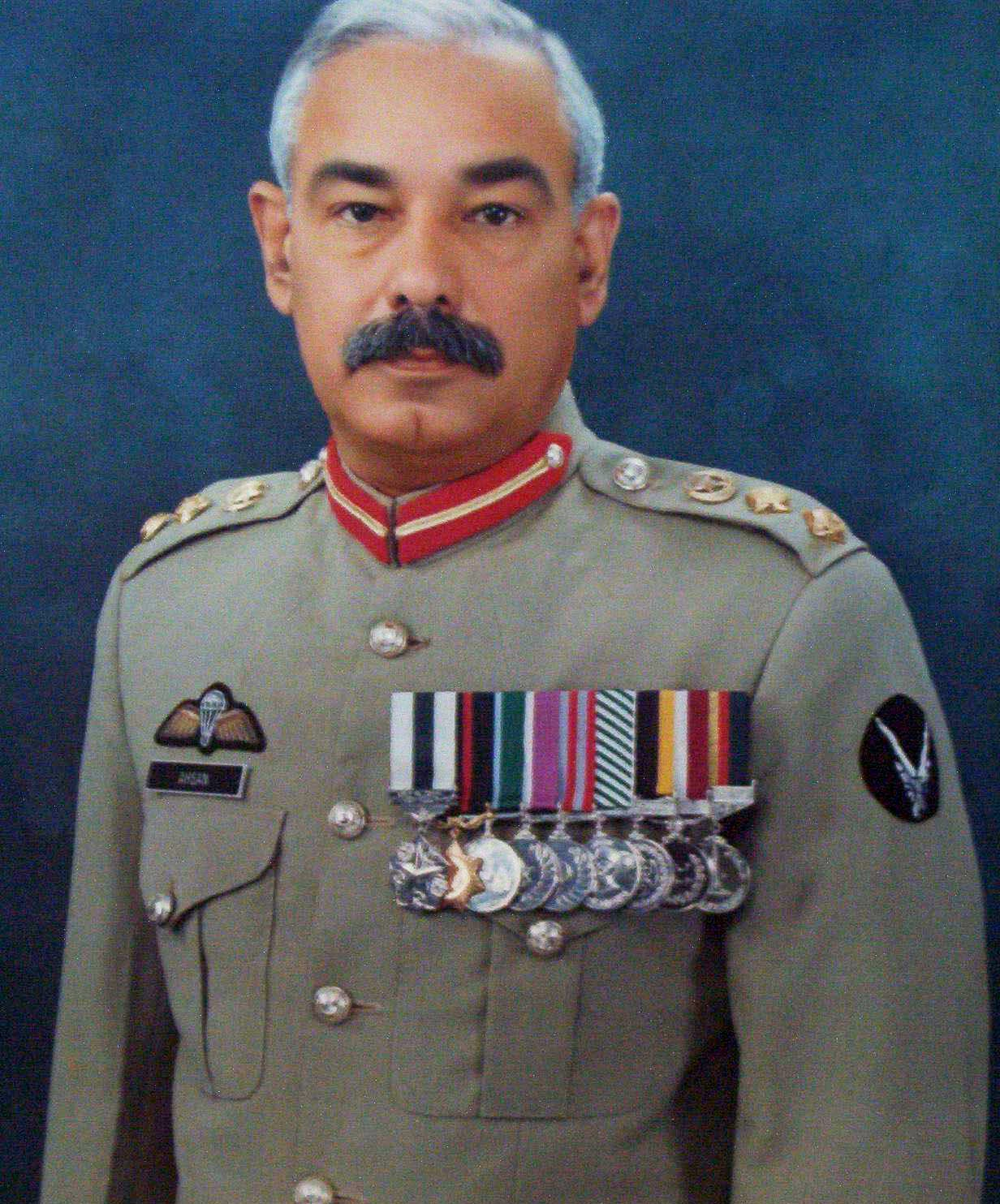
- Malik in 2010
- Born: Ahsan Siddique Malik; November 3, 1948 (age 77); Gujranwala, Punjab, Pakistan
- Allegiance: Pakistan
- Branch: Pakistan Army
- Conflicts: Indo-Pak War of 1971; Battle of Kamalpur
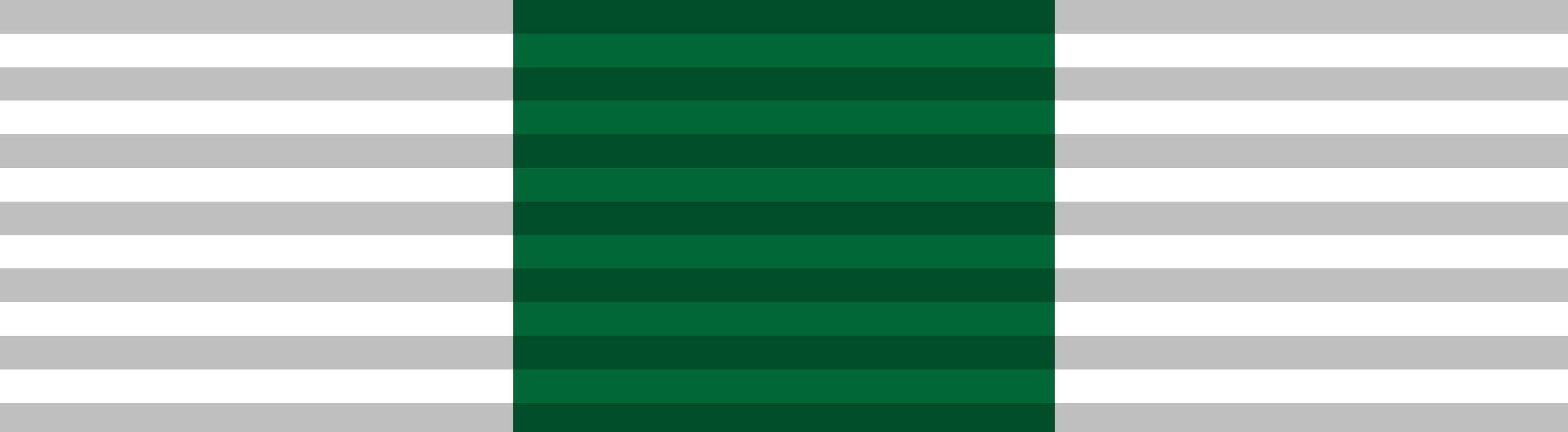
- Awards: Sitara-e-Jurat Sitara-e-Imtiaz (Military)
- Education: Pakistan Military Academy

Ahsan Siddique Malik SJ SI(M) (Born 3 November 1948) is a retired Pakistan Army officer who is best known defending Kamalpur in the Indo-Pakistani War of 1971, when he was a captain in the 31st Battalion, Baloch Regiment.

== Career ==
In late 1971, Malik commanded the border post at Kamalpur. The garrison was subjected to engagements by Mukti Bahini forces and the Indian Army's 13th Battalion, Brigade of the Guards. Following attacks on October 22 and November 14, the post was isolated from Pakistani supply lines. Subsequent attempts by the 31st Battalion to extract Malik's unit or resupply the garrison on November 29 were unsuccessful.

Indian forces, under the command of Brigadier Hardev Singh Kler, established a siege of the Kamalpur position. On December 4, 1971, the post was targeted by multiple sorties of Indian Air Force MiG-21 aircraft. Following written communications from Indian Major General Gurbux Singh and a subsequent directive via radio from Pakistani command, Malik surrendered the post at 19:00 hours on December 4. The engagement lasted approximately 21 days.

Following the war, the Chief of Army Staff of the Indian Army, Sam Manekshaw, acknowledged the defense of the Kamalpur garrison in correspondence with Pakistani military officials. Upon his return to Pakistan, Malik was awarded the Sitara-e-Jurat, the third-highest military decoration in the Pakistan Armed Forces.

== Awards and decorations ==
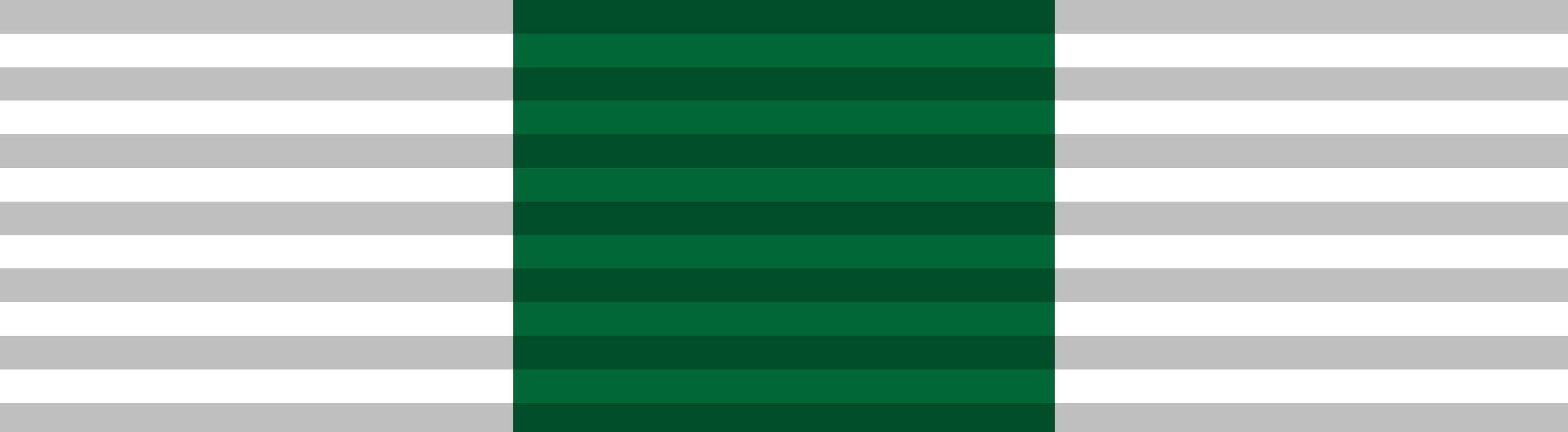

Sitara-e-Jurat (Star of Courage) 1971 War	Sitara-e-Imtiaz (Military) (Star of Excellence)		Sitara-e-Harb 1971 War (War Star 1971)
Tamgha-e-Jang 1971 War (War Medal 1971)	10 Years Service Medal	20 Years Service Medal	30 Years Service Medal
Tamgha-e-Sad Saala Jashan-e- Wiladat-e-Quaid-e-Azam (100th Birth Anniversary of Muhammad Ali Jinnah) 1976	Hijri Tamgha (Hijri Medal) 1979	Jamhuriat Tamgha (Democracy Medal) 1988	Qarardad-e-Pakistan Tamgha (Resolution Day Golden Jubilee Medal) 1990

== See also ==
- Last Stand
- Defence of Kamalpur
