= Bhusnoor =

Village in Karnataka, India

- village
- Country: India
- State: Karnataka
- District: Gulbarga
- Talukas: Aland

Population (2001)
  - Total: 5,305

Languages
  - Official: Kannada
- Time zone: UTC+5:30 (IST)

Bhusnoor is a village in the southern state of Karnataka, India. It is located in the Aland taluk of Kalaburagi district in Karnataka.

== Demographics ==
As of 2001 India census, Bhusnoor had a population of 5305 with 2768 males and 2537 females.

== See also ==
- Gulbarga
- Districts of Karnataka
