= Kamalapur Assembly constituency =

Kamalapur Assembly constituency may refer to:

- Kamalapur, Karnataka Assembly constituency, former constituency in Karnataka
- Kamalapur, Andhra Pradesh Assembly constituency, former constituency in Andhra Pradesh (area is now in Telangana)
- Kamalapuram Assembly constituency, Andhra Pradesh Assembly constituency

== See also ==
- Kamalapur (disambiguation)
- Kamalpur (disambiguation)
