= Sathya Sai Baba movement =

Movement inspired by Hindu guru Sathya Sai Baba

The Sathya Sai Baba movement is a new religious movement inspired by South Indian Neo-Hindu guru Sathya Sai Baba who taught the unity of all religions. Some of his followers have faith in his claim to be a purna Avatar (full divine incarnation) of Shiva and Shakti, who is believed to have been predicted in the Bhagavad Gita. This means that some of his followers see him as a God. Devotees engage in singing devotional songs called "bhajans" and selfless service (seva). Its official organization is the Sathya Sai Organization. However the Sathya Sai Baba movement extends beyond the organization. An important aspect of the faith of adherents is the miracles attributed to Sathya Sai Baba. The number of adherents is estimated between 6 and 100 million.

== Official life story of Sathya Sai Baba and history of the movement ==
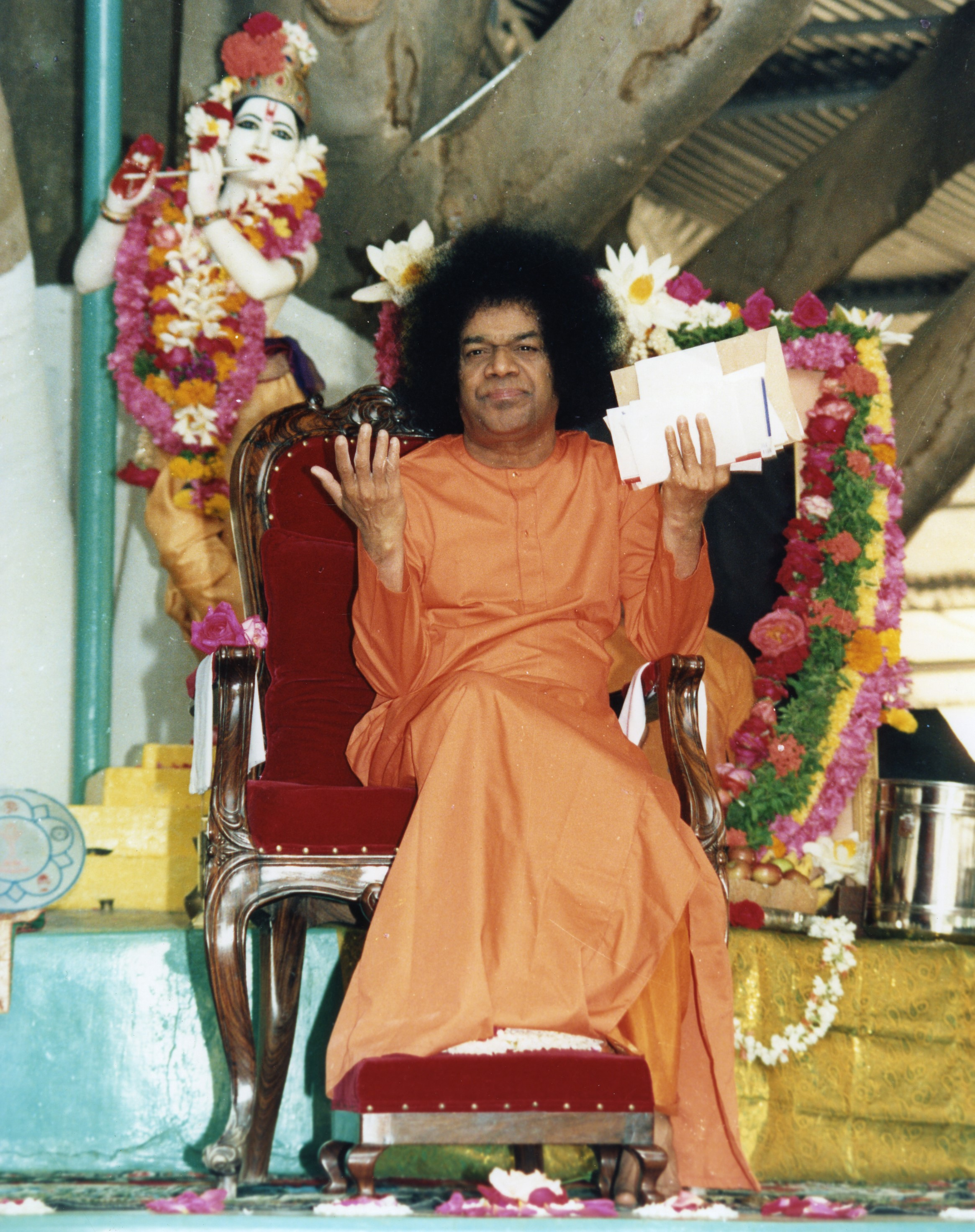
Sathya Sai Baba

The official biography of Sathya Sai Baba was written by Narayana Kasturi. Additional sources for the official life story are Sathya Sai Baba's discourses.

Sathya Sai Baba was born on 23 November 1926. His birth name was Sathyanarayana Raju. Sathya (as Sai Baba referred to himself in those days) "was known to be very lively", and composed many plays, poems and songs for school and friends. He also taught the local children and villagers how to read and write. He was called by his neighbors "Brahmajnani," meaning a "Realized Soul." In sixth standard, Sathya left Puttaparthi to live with his elder brother, Seshama and his wife in Kamalapuram. About a year later, "holidays came and Seshama Raju took Sathya to Hampi." A municipal chairman witnessed Sathya being both inside a Siva temple and outside (looking after his brothers luggage) simultaneously. Afterwards, he presented the boy with "a collar pin made of gold." During a discourse in 2000, Sathya Sai Baba related the events that transpired a few days after, "He (Sathya) left the house and went about ten feet when the collar pin fell and could not be found... The collar pin symbolised worldly attachment, and when it was lost, it was symbolic of the end of the 'Raju phase' and attachments implied by it. Declaring that He had no worldly relationship with anyone, he ran to the house of one Anjaneyulu... In front of his house there was a small rock. Swami (Sathya Sai Baba) went and sat on that stone."

Narayana Kasturi's biography states Sathya Sai Baba performed many miracles (healings, levitation, materialization of fruit, sweets, pencils, pictures etc. and clairvoyance). At approximately age 14, Sathya Sai Baba made a claim that he was the reincarnation of the fakir, Sai Baba of Shirdi. To validate his claim it is alleged that jasmine flowers were dropped onto the ground and that they miraculously arranged themselves into the words "Sai Baba" in Telugu. At that time, he began his spiritual mission.

The first volume of Sathya Sai Speaks covers discourses given during the years 1953 to 1960. In this volume can be read the many early claims of divinity made by Sathya Sai Baba, including those of omnipotence and omniscience.

During the month of June 1963, Sathya Sai Baba suffered a stroke and 4 heart attacks. His left side was paralysed, and the sight in his left eye and speech were badly affected. After sprinkling water on his left hand and leg, he made a full recovery and delivered a Guru Poornima discourse. During the discourse he said, "Shiva said that they (Shiva and Shakti) would take human form and be born in the Bharadwaja lineage, thrice: Shiva alone as Shirdi Sai Baba, Shiva and Shakthi together at Puttaparthi as Sathya Sai Baba, and Shakthi alone as Prema Sai, later."

In a 1976 interview, he repeated his claim to be a full divine Avatar, saying "I have come armed with the fullness of the power of formless God to correct mankind, raise human consciousness and put people back on the right path of truth, righteousness, peace and love to divinity."

Between 1988 and 2006, Sathya Sai Baba suffered three accidents, the second of which left him with a fractured hip and a broken femur. He later moved among devotees in his car or Porte Chair.

It is claimed that he performed a number of miracles including: levitation (both indoors and outdoors), bilocation, physical disappearances, changing granite into sugar candy, changing water into another drink, changing water into gasoline, producing objects on demand, changing the color of his gown while wearing it, multiplying food, healing acute and chronic diseases, appearing in visions and dreams, making different fruits appear on any tree hanging from actual stems, controlling the weather, physically transforming into various deities and physically emitting brilliant light. Sathya Sai Baba gained followers in India from the 1930s. Outside of India, he became popular from the 1960s and 1970s. During the period from 1970 to 1983, the number of Sathya Sai Baba centres in the United Kingdom grew from 2 to 51.

== Beliefs and practices of devotees ==
Sathya Sai Baba gave discourses on religious topics to devotees in his native language Telugu. Twice daily, some devotees engage in worship of Sathya Sai Baba by conducting rituals such as aarti and singing devotional songs in front of his picture. Sathya Sai Baba has said that his followers do not need to give up their original religion, saying "My objective is the establishment of Sanathana Dharma, which believes in one God as propitiated by the founders of all religions. So none has to give up his religion or deity ... I have come not to disturb or destroy any Faith, but to confirm each in his own Faith, so that the Christian becomes a better Christian, the Muslim a better Muslim and a Hindu a better Hindu." According to Ocean of Love, a book published by the Sri Sathya Sai Central Trust, "there is no new path that He is preaching, no new order that He has created. There is no new religion that He has come to add or a particular philosophy that He recommends ... His mission is unique and simple. His mission is that of love and compassion."

On 24 November 1926, Sri Aurobindo Ghosh came out of his trance and announced that Krishna ("overmind Godhead") "descended into the physical". On the day before this announcement, 23 November 1926, was the birth date of Sathya Sai Baba Many felt that Sri Aurobindo's announcement heralded the Sathya Sai Avatar.

Sathya Sai Baba devotees gather on Thursdays in the US and on weekends in other regions of the world for group devotional singing (bhajans), prayer, spiritual meditation, service to the community (Seva), and to participate in "Education in Human Values" (SSEHV), also known as Sai Spiritual Education (SSE) and (in India) Balvikas. (Sai Sunday School) The Australian Sai organization states, "we come together as spiritual seekers to sing our devotion to God, singing to many different names and forms that God is worshipped by." Sathya Sai baba himself says of bhajans, "I do not need songs glorifying God which like gramophone records, reproduce songs and strings of Gods names without any feeling or yearning while singing. Hours of shouting do not count, a moment of concentrated prayer from the heart is enough."

Devotees still receive Sai Baba's Divya Darshan at his Mahasamadhi shrine, a white marble edifice decorated with flowers, in Sai Kulwant Hall (Prasanthi Nilayam), where he was laid to rest.

Sevā (selfless service) activities, being "at the heart of Sathya Sai Baba's teachings", strives to take an active role to serve the needs of the community. Center Seva activities and projects include

- Arranging food bank drives and donations
- Visiting nursing homes
- Greening (tree planting and park cleanup)
- Medical camps
- Donating blood (giving liquid love)
- Serving food to the homeless
- Collecting old and used spectacle frames for distribution to disadvantaged people in various parts of the world

Other Sai Center activities include study of the teachings of Sathya Sai Baba and the sacred literature of all religions, Sai Spiritual Education (SSE), dynamic value parenting programs, and study circles (taking a point and each person discussing what it means to them).

Through center activities, the hope is to achieve the practical spirituality of incorporating the universal human values in all aspects of life and during every conscious moment.

Sathya Sai Baba advocates reverence, adoration and gratitude to the Mother (and parents) as being God, and the first (and foremost) teacher and guru. Sai Baba often cites well known figures (Abraham Lincoln, Gandhi, Ishwar Chandra Vidyasagar) who have attained their good character, humility and morality due to listening to the advice of their mother. Sai Baba has said, "There is nothing greater than mother's love. Mother's words are always sweet." Additionally, Sai Baba has repeatedly stated "Rama, Krishna, Shivaji and Gandhi became what they were because of their mothers. Same way, I am Sathya Sai today because of Easwaramma (his mother)!"

Sathya Sai Baba has written several articles on religious topics, later collected by the trust in the form of books, titled "Vahinis" (vehicles). There are fifteen vahinis, comprising sixteen books (the Ramakatha Rasavahini having two parts). Sathya Sai Baba's discourses are presented in the Sathya Sai Speaks series.

Sathya Sai Baba recommends meditation (dhyan) for acquiring one-pointed attention on the Lord. Having written a vahini on the subject of meditation (dhyan), Baba suggests four techniques: repetition of one's own favourite 'name of God' (Rama, Sai, Allah, Aum etc. ...), visualizing the form of God (i.e. Guru, Buddha, Jesus, Sai Baba, etc. ...), sitting in silence, and jyoti (Flame/Light meditation).

The Sai organization promotes and advocates five human values: Sathya (truth), Dharma (Sanskrit word translated as "right conduct"), Ahimsa (non-violence), Prema (love for God and all his creatures) and Shanti (peace).

Other teachings are:

- Non-dualism or Adwaitam which implies Oneness of existence.
- "Love all, Serve all", Love for all creatures and objects.
- Putting a ceiling on one's desires.
- "Help ever, Hurt never"
- Celibacy after the age of fifty.
- Vegetarianism, moderate and sattvic diet (pure with regard to ingredients, utensils, manner of preparation, and mental attitude).
- Abstinence from drinking alcohol, smoking cigarettes, and drug use.
- Importance of bhakti (devotion) to God.
- Developing "prashanti" (translates to "Highest Peace") and eschewing vices of character.
- Japa (ritual chanting of Baba's name), thinking of God always, and other sadhana (spiritual exercise) to foster devotion.
- Highly committed devotees use the phrase "Sai Ram" as a salutation.
- Conducting pooja or aarti (a form of ritual worship) twice daily in front of Baba photos.
- "Yagnas" (or ritual worship, involving ritual offerings of fruits, vegetables and ghee to a pyre) are frequently conducted at the ashram.
- The propagation of peace around the world and avoidance of conflict. Non-violence towards all sentient life and avoidance of elective abortion.
- Man seeks the Truth; he seeks to know the reality because his very nature is derived from God who is Truth. He seeks Love, to give it and share it, for his nature is God and God is Love.

== Practices in the ashrams and the person of Sathya Sai Baba ==
The popularity and the donations by followers enabled Sathya Sai Baba and his organizations to build an ever-increasing ashram called Prashanthi Nilayam near the once poor and isolated village of Puttaparthi.

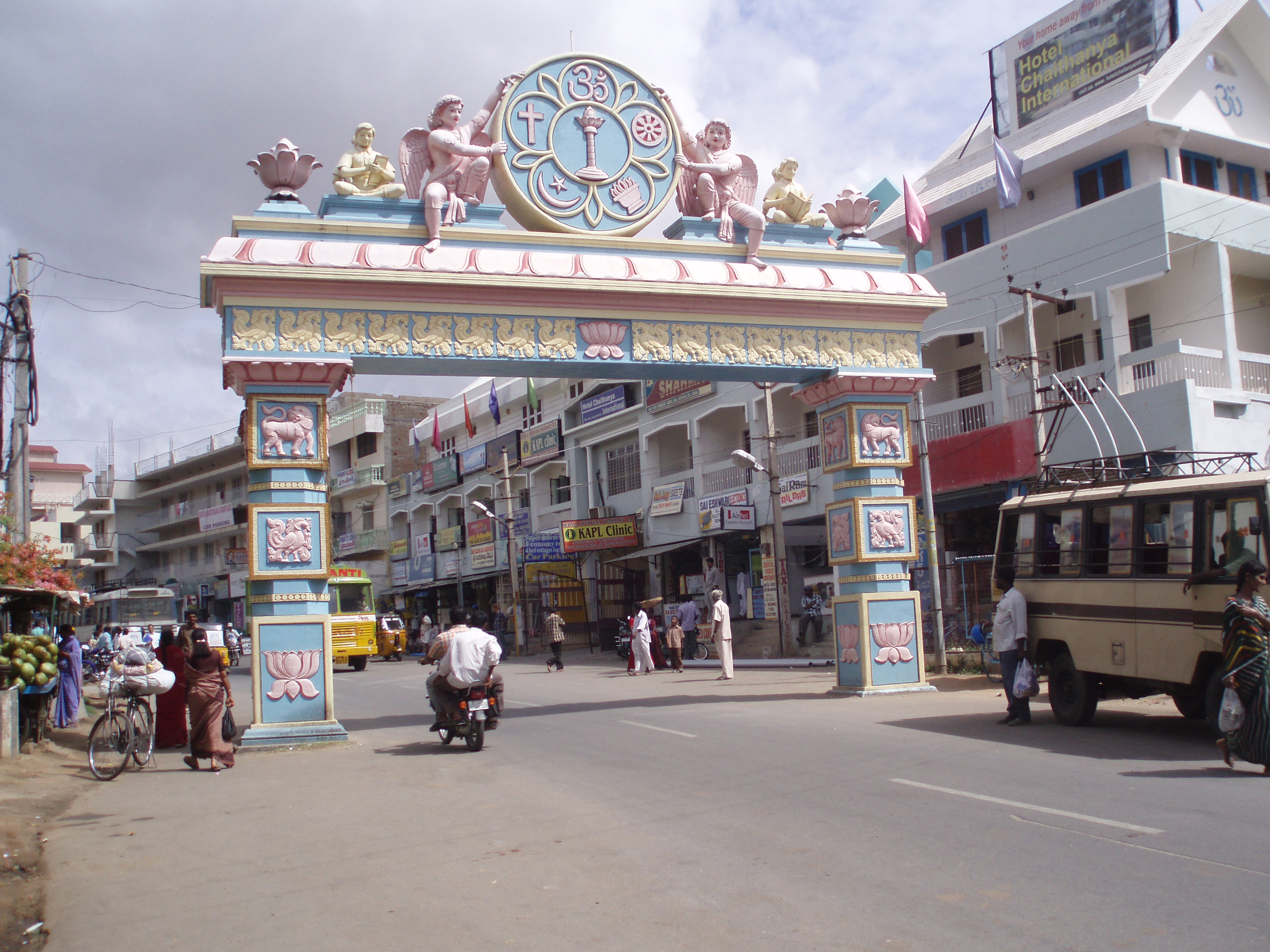
Entrance to Puttaparthi, with the old symbol of the Sathya Sai Organization above it

An important practice in his ashram in Puttaparthi was the darshan (spiritual sight) that Sathya Sai Baba gave. During darshan Sathya Sai Baba walked among his followers. He may have listened to a few chosen persons, accepted letters, or materialized and distributed vibhuti (sacred ash). He said that his darshan has spiritual benefits for those who attended it. Usually people waited hours to get a good place for darshan. Sathya Sai Baba sometimes invited people for a group interview with him in a room in the ashram's mandir (Hindu temple). Followers considered it a great privilege to get such an interview. Sometimes a person from this group was invited for a private interview.

Sathya Sai Baba's manifestations of vibuthi emphasized his claim to be a reincarnation of Shirdi Sai Baba who used to take ash, called udhi, from an ever-burning fire, called a dhuni. Vibuthi is an ancient Hindu symbol, among others associated with Shiva.

Sathya Sai Baba resided much of the time in his main ashram Prashanthi Nilayam ("Abode of Highest Peace") at Puttaparthi. During the hot summer the guru left for his other ashram called Brindavan in Whitefield, India (sometimes called Kadugodi), a town on the outskirts of Bangalore. He has left India only once for a visit to Eastern Africa in 1968.

He was a prolific orator in his native language of Telugu, and also spoke Tamil. He claimed to be the Kali Yuga purna Avatar (full divine incarnation of this era) of Lord Shiva and Shakti. He said that he is omniscient, omnipotent and omnipresent and could create matter from mere thought. He also stressed he was free from desires, and that this was the state that one should aim to attain, consistent with the Vedic teachings. He played down his claims about being an incarnation of God by saying that everybody is God but that only he realizes and experiences this fully. In correspondence with his perceived divinity, followers often capitalize references to him in their writings ("He", "Him", etc.).

Sathya Sai Baba prophesied that he would reincarnate again in the 21st century as Prema Sai Baba to finish the spiritual transformation of the world, starting with India, where his previous and current incarnations have begun. Sathya Sai Baba has stated that his three incarnations will help to usher in the Golden Age of mankind that will come soon.

He said he would die at the age of 96. After he died, some devotees suggested that he might have been referring to that many lunar years, rather than solar years, and using the Indian way of accounting for age, which counts the year to come as part of the person's life.

Sathya Sai Baba said he performed miracles to attract people and then to transform them spiritually, telling his followers not to focus on his miracles. He could be seen in person to perform these miracles in the form of materializations of small objects, for example jewelry such as bracelets, rings, watches and especially vibhuti (holy ash). He said in a 1976 interview that these trinkets have symbolic value, and offer the owners protection by reminding them of his protecting powers when in danger. Occasionally, at Maha Shivaratri, he publicly produced lingams that came out of his mouth that devotees claim materialized in his body. He said that he can heal the diseases of his devotees by either his spiritual power or by taking on the disease himself. There is anecdotal evidence that supports this claim.

Babb wrote in a 1983 article that "the miraculous are absolutely central to this religious movement" and that the plausibility of these miracles "seems to pull people into convictions ostensibly at odds with what their own subculture deems to be common sense and considered judgment". He wrote in that article that his observations are based on his contact with the local following of Sathya Sai Baba in Delhi that according to Babb included a sophisticated and cosmopolitan elite. Babb further wrote in that article that the energy of Sathya Sai Baba's "magic" can have "life-transforming effects on devotees."

Sathya Sai Baba has said that all of his acts have meaning and significance. So many followers interpret the acts and sayings of the guru as teachings, sometimes even as personal teachings. Some followers, especially in the ashram, attribute coincidences to Baba's will and try to find a sometimes hidden meaning in them. Babb wrote in a 1986 book that some devotees tend attribute every event to Sathya Sai Baba's will and tend to see the world as an enchanted garden. He says that when a person dreams about him then this is because of his will and this is a form of his communication with people. Followers report dreams that contain messages from the guru to them. Some people became devotees after having such a dream.

== Teachings ==
The Sathya Sai Baba movement advocates the unity of all religions. Sathya Sai Baba said that all religions lead to God and that followers should continue to follow their original religions. He said that those who follow his teachings would find themselves exampling their own original faith more fully, i.e. that will make Christians become better Christians and Hindus better Hindus, et cetera. The five basic human values that he advocates are: Truth (Satya), Right Conduct (Dharma), Peace (Shanti), Love for God and all creatures (Prema), and Non-violence (Ahimsa).

He taught a rather traditional but eclectic form of Hinduism that come from many sects and movements including advaita, occasionally drawing from other religions like Buddhism, Sikhism, and Christianity. He said that he has come to restore faith in, and the practice of, the Vedas. He said that a very important way a person can emancipate oneself is through self-less service to one's fellow man (seva).

Sathya Sai Baba repeatedly stressed the importance of sadhana (Hindu spiritual exercises) for example by meditation. He asserted that sadhana is important for achieving moksha or kaivalyam (liberation from ignorance and from the endless re-births due to karmic consequences). Sathya Sai Baba taught the importance of Bhakti yoga (Hindu devotion to God).

He preached a strict morality with regards to sensual desires (including food, sex, meat, alcohol). Some of his exhortations were to put a ceiling on desires. By this, he seemed to mean that followers should not waste time and money. He taught that the world is just maya , that only God is real and that the seeming diversity of all life is another illusion. All life is one, he said. The meaning of life is to experience this oneness with God and other living beings.

Followers attribute many miracles to him which they witness in his presence and in their own countries, like spontaneous vibhuti manifestations on the pictures of the guru in their homes, and bilocation, the appearance of Sai Baba in their own presence while he is also in another place. They also report that he has materialized out-of-season fruit several times. He said he performs these miracles to attract people and then to transform them spiritually.

Sathya Sai Baba said that he does not speak through other people in a discourse in 1962. In spite of this, the British author Lucas Ralli claimed that he received messages from Sathya Sai Baba and wrote in his books that his claim was endorsed by Sathya Sai Baba in an interview. His books with messages from Sathya Sai Baba are sold by the Sathya Sai Book Center of America.

The anthropologist Lawrence Babb wrote that he considered the teachings of secondary importance in the cult when compared to the emphasis on the miraculous. Babb further wrote about the Sai doctrine that "[...] there is little relatively to dwell upon, or at least nothing very distinctive. His philosophical views are simplistic, eclectic, and essentially unoriginal." The anthropologist Alexandra Kent notes that this lack of originality is in correspondence with Sathya Sai Baba's claim to revive old truths.

The main objective of the Sathya Sai Organization, as Sathya Sai Baba himself said, "is to help you recognize the divinity inherent in you. So, your duty is to emphasize the One, to experience the One in all you do or speak. Do not give importance to differences of religion, sect, status, or colour. Have the feeling of one-ness permeate all your acts. Only those who do so have a place in this Organization; the rest can withdraw."

== Activities in local Sathya Sai Baba groups ==
Globally, local Sathya Sai Baba groups assemble to sing bhajans (devotional songs). Baba says that concentration on the name of God with the help of bhajans will easily lead to concentration on God and to higher devotion. Bhajans are sung at nearly every meeting. Bhajans are simple verses. One line is sung by a lead singer and is then repeated by the rest of the group. In those bhajans the name of traditional Hindu deities have sometimes been replaced by the names of Sathya Sai Baba. In addition they study Sathya Sai Baba's teachings and the holy books of the various world religions. They also perform community service, which they call seva. The greeting Sai Ram is used by followers.

== Organizations ==
There are both independently founded Sai Study Groups worldwide, and also local Sai Samithis (Sathya Sai Baba groups) are part of a hierarchical structure called the Sri Sathya Sai International Organization. The current chairman of the Sri Sathya Sai International Organization (SSSIO) is Dr. Narendranath Reddy. He has been the chairman since 2011 and also serves as the chairman of the Prasanthi Council and the International Medical Committee. The logo of the Sathya Sai organization is a stylized lotus flower with the text of the five human values written in each petal. These are Love, Truth, Peace, Righteousness and Non-violence. This text version has replaced the old logo with the symbols of the main five or six world religions in the petals.

The charter of the Sai Organization says that every member should undertake sadhana (spiritual discipline) as an integral part of daily life and abide by the following nine-point code of conduct.

1. Daily meditation and prayer.
2. Devotional singing/prayer with family members once per week.
3. Participation in the educational programmes conducted by the Organization for children.
4. Attendance at least once per month at group devotional programmes conducted by the Organization.
5. Participation in community service and other programmes of the Organization.
6. Regular study of Sai literature.
7. Putting into practice the principles of "ceiling on desires", utilizing any savings thereby generated for the service of mankind.
8. Speaking softly and lovingly with everyone with whom one comes into contact.
9. Avoiding talking ill of others, especially in their absence.

Sathya Sai Baba is the figurehead to a number of free educational institutions, charitable organizations and service projects that are spread over 10,000 centres in 166 countries around the world.

The Sri Sathya Sai Institute of Higher Learning in Prashanti Nilayam is the only college in India to have received an "A++" rating by the National Assessment and Accreditation Council (an autonomous body established by the University Grants Commission). Besides this institute, there is also an Institute of Music and an Institute of Higher Learning in Anantapur, which is a women's college.

The Sri Sathya Sai Institute of Higher Medical Sciences in Puttaparthi (also known as the Super Specialty Hospital) is a 220-bed facility providing advanced surgical and medical care free of cost to the public. It is situated six kilometers from the guru's ashram and was inaugurated by the then Prime Minister Narasimha Rao on 22 November 1991 and was designed by the Prince of Wales's architectural adviser, Keith Critchlow The Sri Sathya Sai Institute of Higher Medical Sciences in Bangalore is a 333-bed facility with advanced operation theatres, ICUs and CCUs meant to benefit the poor. The hospital was inaugurated on 19 January 2001 by the then Prime Minister Atal Behari Vajpayee. Other eminent participants were Abdul Kalam, Michael Nobel (distant relative of Alfred Nobel), and Anji Reddy. The hospital has served 250,000 patients, free of cost, from January 2001 to April 2004.

The Sri Sathya Sai General Hospital was opened in Whitefield, Bangalore, in 1977 by Sathya Sai Baba to provide free care to poor local villagers. Since that time, the general hospital has grown to a 35,000 sq ft (3,300 m^{2}) building that provides complex surgeries, food and medicines free of cost. The hospital has, since its inception, treated over 2 million cases.

The Sri Sathya Sai Central Trust runs several general hospitals, two super specialty hospitals, dispensaries, eye hospitals and mobile dispensaries and conducts medical camps in rural and slum areas in India. It was in 2000–2001 the largest recipient of foreign donations. The Trust has also funded several major drinking water projects. The first drinking water project, completed in 1996, supplies water to 1.2 million people in 730-800 villages in the drought-prone Anantapur district in Andhra Pradesh. The second drinking water project, completed in 2004, supplies water to Chennai (formerly known as Madras) through a rebuilt waterway named "Sathya Sai Ganga Canal". The Chennai water drinking project was praised by Tamil Nadu Chief Minister, M Karunanidhi. Karunanidhi said that although he is an atheist, he differentiated between good spiritual leaders like Sathya Sai Baba and fake godmen. The third drinking water project, expected to be completed in April 2006, would supply water from the Godavari River to half a million people living in five hundred villages in East and West Godavari Districts. Other completed water projects include the Medak District Project benefiting 450,000 people in 179 villages and the Mahbubnagar District Project benefitting 350,000 people in 141 villages. In January 2007, the Sri Sathya Sai Central Trust revealed that it would undertake another drinking water project in Latur, Maharashtra.

His Educare (formerly called Education in Human Values) programme seeks to found schools in all countries with the explicit goal of educating children in the five human values and spirituality.

The Sri Sathya Sai Books and Publications Trust is the official publisher of the Sathya Sai Organization. It publishes the international monthly magazine called Sanathana Sarathi in English and Telugu. According to their website, they shelve over a thousand books and provide Sai-related literature in 40 languages. The book trust also supplies CDs, DVDs and audio tapes. In various nations, similar publication trusts are maintained in their own native language.

On 23 November 2001, the digital radio network "Radio Sai Global Harmony" was launched through the World Space Organization, USA. Dr. Michael Nobel (distant relative of Alfred Nobel, and one of the patrons for the radio network) said that the radio network would spread Sathya Sai Baba's message of global harmony and peace.

In 2020, Sri Satya Sai Central Trust was granted Special Consultative status by United Nations Economic and Social Council

== Celebrations and commemorations ==
The most important celebrations and commemorations are

- Maha Shivaratri the great night of Shiva, date is based on the Hindu calendar.
- Easwaramma day on 6 May Celebration and commemoration of Sathya Sai Baba's mother
- Sathya Sai Baba's Birthday 23 November
- Guru Purnima date is based on the Hindu calendar. Gratitude and devotion to the guru is shown.
- Janmastami
- Christmas

== Conversion and mission ==
John D. Kelly, as of 2006 a professor of anthropology at the University of Chicago, wrote in an article about Hindu mission in Fiji that the Sai Baba movement was missionary. In contrast, Dr. Kim Knott who worked as of 1997 at the department of theology and religious studies of the University of Leeds, untagged in a table the "Sathya Sai Baba Fellowship" as missionary. Sathya Sai Baba has discouraged publicity and proselytism for him in a public discourse (23 November 1968).

== Characterizations and classifications ==
Scholarly sources generally describe the Sathya Sai Baba movement as that of Hindu. Sai Baba's followers considered him to be the avatar of Shiva and Kalki, while he himself claimed to be a reincarnation of Sai Baba of Shirdhi. Charles S. J. White, of The American University at Washington D.C., said, "Apart from his name, there is no discernible Muslim influence in the Sathya Sai Baba cult." He said that Sai Baba's style is mostly similar to Medieval Hindu practice called nathpanthis. Lawrence A. Babb, of the Amherst College in Massachusetts, also labelled Sai Baba movement as a cult, which is "deeply and authentically Hindu." He states that the devotees "rarely dwell on matters of doctrine, which is not surprising, for in fact there is relatively little to dwell upon, or at least nothing very distinctive. His philosophical views are simplistic, eclectic, and essentially unorigin... The most striking feature of this cult, however, is the extremely strong emphasis given to the miraculous." Babb sees as its highly individualized focus on miracles instead of a focus on a world view. Deborah A. Swallow, of the University of Cambridge, also agreed to the cult description. She compared Sathya Sai Baba with his (alleged) predecessor Sai Baba of Shirdi, who was associated with both Hindu and Islam. She concluded that Sathya Sai Baba's connection to Islam was vague, and that his "ritual and theology, then, unlike Sai Baba [of Shirdi]'s, is distinctly Hindu in form and content." The wide range of devotees including Muslims, Sikhs, Parsees, Jews and Christians is "the composite symbol of his cult." According to Alexandra Kent, at the Gothenburg University in Sweden, Sai Baba movement "differs from the other movements in its concerted efforts to transcend ethnic and religious divisions" in order to promote universal religion. But at its core it teaches "the eternal Hindu truth." She called it the "Hindu Revitalization movement." This is essential for Indian people living in different countries to maintain their inherently Hindu culture.

Knott tagged in a table the "Sathya Sai Baba Fellowship" as devotional, charismatic authority, reformist, and including non-Asian membership. Untagged were revivalist, missionary, and caste-related.

Kelly wrote that the Sathya Sai Organizations reject the label Hindu although they were clearly Hindu mission. According to Kelly, they saw its founder as the "living synthesis of the world's religious traditions" and prefers to be classified as an interfaith movement. He noted that "They instruct their children to fill out methodically the prayer, school, and chore daily schedules that rival the ones devised by Benjamin Franklin, the ones that so impressed Max Webber." Kelly further wrote when comparing ISKCON with the Sai Baba mission (he does not write which Sai Baba mission he means) that the Sai Baba efforts in Fiji are ambiguous where ISKCON is dogmatic and structured, proliferating where ISKCON is planned and controlled, self-contradictory where ISKCON is clear, gentle where ISKCON is stern, and to put it most broadly, open where ISKCON is closed. Kelly further stated that the Sai organization in Fiji does not ask its members to undergo initiation or to commit themselves to obey particular leaders.

Former follower Nagel asserted that the atmosphere surrounding Sathya Sai Baba was clearly Hindu, in spite of Sathya Sai Baba's claim to foster and unite a number of different religions and that he dropped all Muslim elements that Shirdi Sai Baba practiced.

A secret report from the Central Intelligence Agency from the 1990s stated that a "worldwide mass religious movement" was emerging around Sathya Sai Baba, who many devotees viewed as a full incarnation of God. On a local scale, the report states that the extensive appeal of Sai Baba's doctrine "of a harmonious, multi-religious and multi-ethnic India has the potential to counterbalance the appeal of Hindu chauvinists and ethnic separatists" Globally, the report concluded that the Sai Baba movement is likely to “become another worldwide religion”, via its current wealth and assets, social contributions and activity in the political domain, thus allowing expansion even after Sai Baba's death. Adding scope to the movement, the report addresses the claim that Sai Baba is the Kalki Avatar (the tenth Avatar of Vishnu) who is to “create a new world of peace and justice”, which the CIA operative compares to the return of Jesus Christ. The CIA report concluded, “there is always the possibility, too, that the movement will collapse if Sai Baba is convincingly demonstrated to be a fraud.”

== Educational institutions, charitable organizations, hospitals and service projects ==
Sathya Sai Baba supports free schools and other charitable works in 166 countries. The Sri Sathya Sai Institute of Higher Learning in Prashanti Nilayam is the only college in India to have received an "A++" rating by the National Assessment and Accreditation Council (an autonomous body established by the University Grants Commission). His charity supports the Institute of Music and the Institute of Higher Learning in Anantapur, which is a women's college.

The Sri Sathya Sai Institute of Higher Medical Sciences in Puttaparthi is a 220-bed facility that provides free surgical and medical care and was inaugurated by the then Prime Minister Narasimha Rao on 22 November 1991. The Sri Sathya Sai Institute of Higher Medical Sciences in Bangalore is a 333-bed hospital meant to benefit the poor. The hospital was inaugurated on 19 January 2001 by the then Prime Minister Atal Behari Vajpayee. The hospital has provided free medical care to over 250,000 patients.

The Sri Sathya Sai General Hospital was opened in Whitefield, Bangalore, in 1977 and provides complex surgeries, food and medicines free of cost. The hospital has treated over 2 million patients.

The Sri Sathya Sai Central Trust runs several general hospitals, two specialty hospitals, eye hospitals and mobile dispensaries and conducts medical camps in rural and slum areas in India. The Trust has also funded several major drinking water projects. One project completed in 1996 supplies water to 1.2 million people in about 750 villages in the drought-prone Anantapur district in Andhra Pradesh. The second drinking water project, completed in 2004, supplies water to Chennai through a rebuilt waterway named "Sathya Sai Ganga Canal". Tamil Nadu Chief Minister M. Karunanidhi praised the Chennai water project and Sai Baba's involvement. Other completed water projects include the Medak District Project benefiting 450,000 people in 179 villages and the Mahbubnagar District Project benefitting 350,000 people in 141 villages. In January 2007, the Sri Sathya Sai Central Trust said it would start a drinking water project in Latur, Maharashtra.

Sai Baba's Educare program seeks to found schools throughout the world with the goal of educating children in the five human values. According to the Sai Educare site, schools have been founded in 33 countries. The Times of Zambia states, "The positive influence of Sathya Sai is unprecedented in the annals of education in Zambia. Sai Baba’s education ideals as embodied in his human values-based approach in education are an eye opener to educationists in Zambia."

On 23 November 2001, the digital radio network "Radio Sai Global Harmony" was launched through the World Space Organization, USA. Dr. Michael Oleinikof Nobel (distant relative to Alfred Nobel and one of the patrons for the radio network) said that the radio network would spread Sathya Sai Baba's message of global harmony and peace.

In January 2007, the Baba was given a big felicitation in Chennai Nehru stadium organised by the Chennai Citizens Conclave for thanking him for the 200 crore water project which brought water from the River Krishna in Andhra Pradesh to Chennai city. Four chief ministers attended the function. The notable news about this event was that Sai Baba was sharing the same dais with Karunanidhi (Chief Minister of Chennai) who is a very well known hardcore atheist against Hindu gurus / godman and that Karunanidhi was felicitating Sai Baba. This was covered in all newspapers.

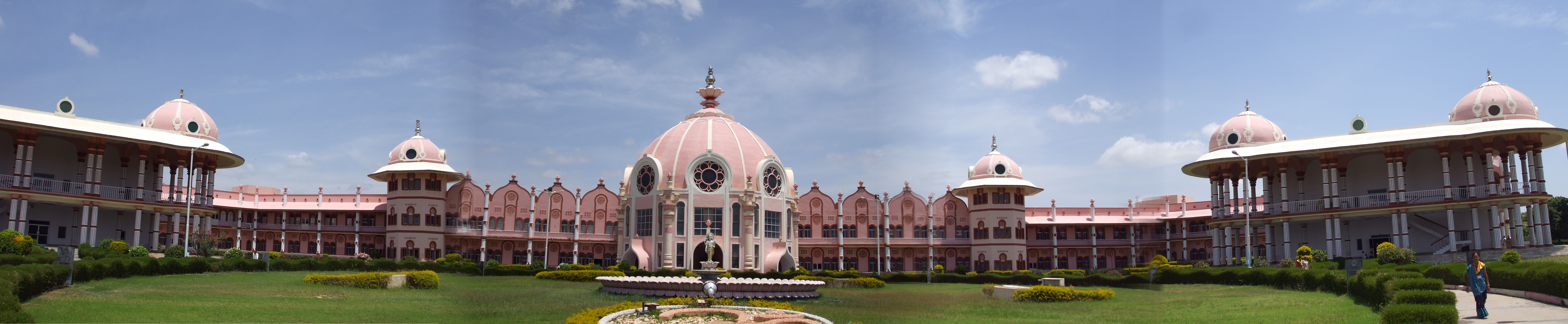
Sri Sathya Sai Super Speciality Hospital, Puttaparthi, A.P., India

== Demographics ==
According to the Sathya Sai Organization, there are an estimated 1,200 Sathya Sai Baba Centers in 130 countries worldwide. The number of adherents is estimated between 6 million and 100 million, predominantly people of Indian ethnic origin. Simon Weightmann who worked as of 1997 at the department for the study of religions at the University of London wrote that Sathya Sai Baba is one of the most popular gurus, both in India and in the Hindu diaspora and that as a consequence of his inclusivist stance he has a large following among the urban middle class. Professor Harold Coward who worked as of 1997 as a professor for the centre of religious studies at the University of Victoria wrote that Sathya Sai Baba, together with several other modern Indian gurus, has attracted more occidental than South Asian Canadians. A significant fraction of the movement in Malaysia is of Chinese extraction, though the majority there is of British East Indian Hindu origin.

In 2000, there were widespread defections in the West due to publications about sexual abuse by Sathya Sai Baba.

== Bibliography ==
- Brown, Mick The Spiritual Tourist (1998) ISBN 1-58234-034-X Bloomsbury Publishing
- Goldthwait, John "Purifying the Heart" (2002) ISBN 81-7208-339-4
- Guillemin, Madeleine "Who is in the Driving Seat?" (2000) ISBN 0-9583617-0-3
- Hislop, John My Baba and I ISBN 81-7208-050-6
- Kasturi, Narayana Sathyam Sivam Sundaran Part I, II, III & IV available online in Microsoft Word format
- Klass, Morton Singing with Sai Baba: The Politics of Revitalization in Trinidad, (1991), Boulder WestView Press
- Krystal, Phyllis "The Ultimate Experience" ISBN 81-7208-038-7
- Murphet, Howard Man of Miracles (1971) 0333-91770-7
- Sandweiss, Samuel H. The holy man ..... and the psychiatrist (1975) ISBN 0-9600958-1-0
- Padmanaban, R. Love is My Form Sai Towers (October 2000)
- Sharma, Arvind New Religious Movements in India in New Religious Movements and Rapid Social Change edited by James A. Beckford ISBN 0-8039-8591-6, pages 228–231, 233
- Sandweiss, Samuel H "Spirit and the Mind" (1985) ISBN 81-7208-056-5
- Thomas, Joy "Life is a Game – Play it" ISBN 81-7208-175-8
- Haraldsson, Erlendur PhD Miracles are my visiting cards – An investigative inquiry on Sathya Sai Baba, an Indian mystic with the gift of foresight believed to perform modern miracles (1997 revised and updated edition) ISBN 81-86822-32-1
- Sandweiss, Samuel H. The holy man ..... and the psychiatrist (1975)
- Sathya Sai Baba Many online books
- Sathya Sai Baba Gita vahini, online book
- Sathya Sai Baba Rama Katha Rasavahini, translated into English by Narayana Kasturi available online
- Sathya Sai Baba Sathya Sai Speaks, Volumes I-. Many of these public discourses have been published on the internet Adobe acrobat PDF files
- Schulman, Arnold Baba (1971) Viking Press, New York, (Out of print but available in some public libraries)
