= Chandrashekhar S. Patil =

Indian politician

Chandrasekhar S. Patil
- ಚಂದ್ರಶೇಖರ ಪಾಟೀಲ
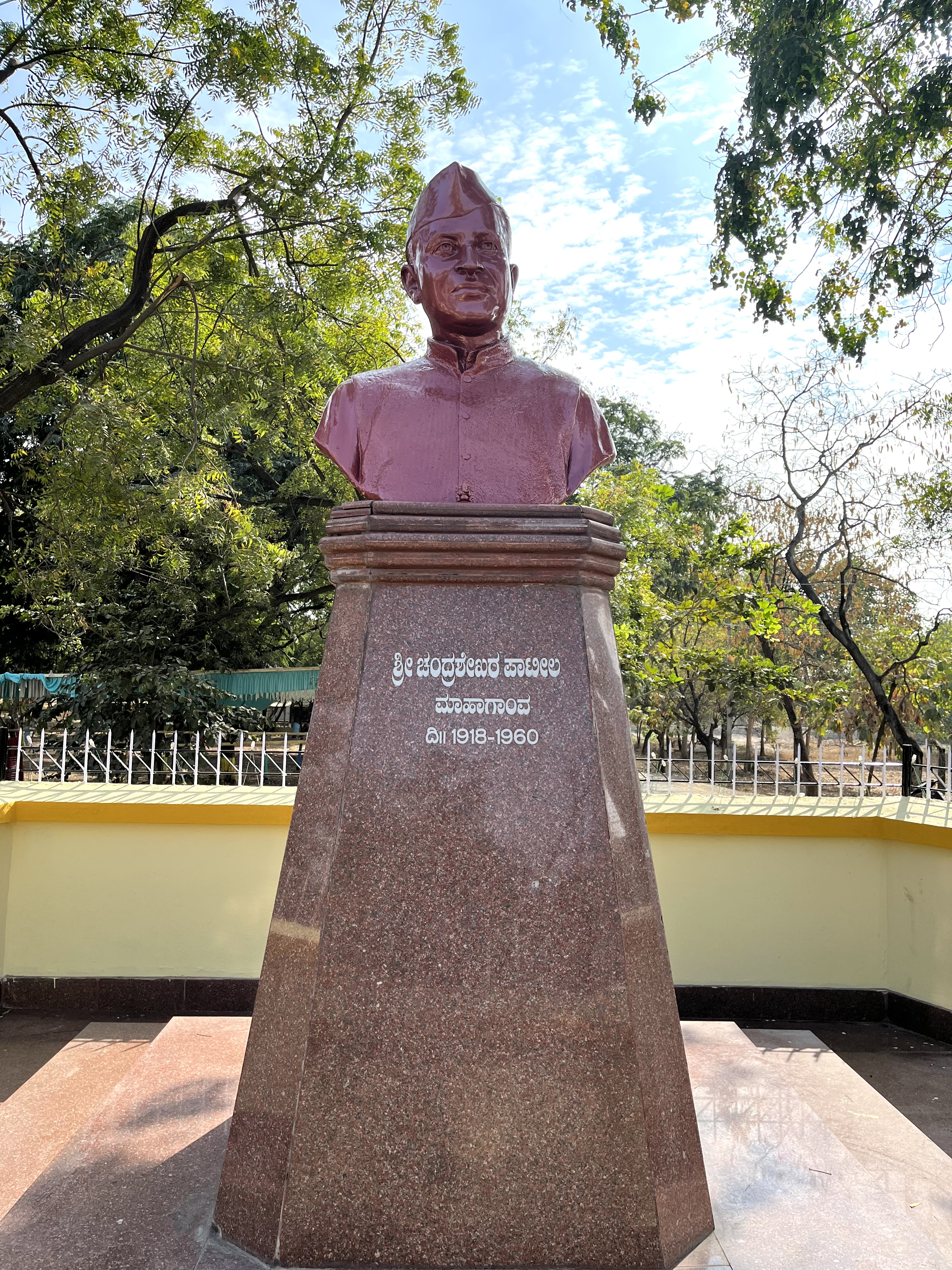

Member of the Legislative Assembly
- In office 1952–1957
- Constituency: Kamalapur, Gulbarga
- In office 1957–1960
- Constituency: Aland, Karnataka

Personal details
- Born: Chandrashekhar Sangashetty Patil; 25 January 1918 Mahagaon, Hyderabad State, British India
- Died: 22 December 1960 (aged 42) Victoria Hospital, Bengaluru, Karnataka, India
- Party: Indian National Congress
- Spouse: Lalitha Bai Patil
- Children: 6
- Occupation: Activist, politician

Chandrashekhar Sangashetty Patil (Kannada: ಚಂದ್ರಶೇಖರ ಸಂಗಶೆಟ್ಟಿ ಪಾಟೀಲ, pronounced [t͡ʃɐn̪d̪rɐˈʃeːkʰɐr sɐŋɡɐˈʃɛʈːi paːˈʈiːl]; 25 January 1918 – 22 December 1960) was an Indian freedom fighter and politician who served as Member of the Legislative Assembly who belonged to the Indian National Congress. Chandrashekhar Patil was born to Sangasetti Patil and Veeramma Patil in Mahagaon, Gulbarga on 25 January 1918. On 22 December 1960 he died in a motor vehicle accident. He was known for having participated in India's freedom struggle and the Liberation of Hyderabad Karnataka. Various books have been written on him, including Tiger of Hyderabad Karnataka Chandrashekhar Patil Mahagaon (published 2019) and ಪ್ರತಿಭಾವಂತ ಸಂಸದೀಯ ಪಟು ಪುಸ್ತಕ ಮೂಲಿಕೆ (published by the Government of Karnataka).

Chandrashekhar S. Patil belonged to the first Karnataka Legislative Assembly. He was elected for a second term in the second Karnataka Legislative assembly for the Aland constituency in 1957 but died before he could complete this term.

== Death ==
On December 20, 1960, while returning from a Khedda viewing program attended by Rajendra Prasad on a special bus with 23 other MLAs, Chandrashekhar S Patil was involved in a serious accident near Kengeri. The bus collided with a truck at the turn of a road, leaving him critically injured. Chandrashekhar S Patil was reported to by bleeding and was rushed to Victoria Hospital where he later succumbed to his injuries. His cremation was performed at Mahagaon with honor and adhering to Veerashaiva Lingayath rites in the presence of Gudleppa Hallikeri a freedom fighter from Hubli, Karnataka.
