= B. R. Patil =

Indian politician

Member of Karnataka Legislative Assembly
- Incumbent
- Assumed office 13 May 2023
- Preceded by: Subhash Guttedar
- Constituency: Aland
- In office 2013–2018
- Preceded by: Subhash Guttedar
- Succeeded by: Subhash Guttedar
- Constituency: Aland
- In office 2004–2008
- Preceded by: Subhash Guttedar
- Succeeded by: Subhash Guttedar
- Constituency: Aland
- In office 1983–1988
- Preceded by: Anna Rao Bhem Rao Patil Kotallia
- Succeeded by: Sharanabasappa Mali Patil Dhangapur
- Constituency: Aland
- In office 1978–1983
- Preceded by: J.Y. Venkappa
- Succeeded by: B. R. Yavagal
- Constituency: Nargund

Deputy Chairman of Karnataka Legislative Council
- In office 5 September 1991 – 7 July 1994
- Preceded by: S. Mallikarjunaiah
- Succeeded by: Rani Satish

Personal details
- Born: 15 November 1949 (age 76) Sarasamba
- Party: Indian National Congress
- Other political affiliations: Karnataka Janatha Paksha, Janata Dal (Secular), Janata Dal (United), Janata Dal, Janata Party
- Parents: Ramchandrappa M Patil (father); Gangabai R Patil (mother)
- Occupation: Politician
- Website: www.brpatilaland.in

Bhojaraj Ramchandrappa Patil (B. R. Patil) is an Indian politician from the state of Karnataka. He is a four-term member of the Karnataka Legislative Assembly who represented Aland Taluk in Kalaburgi District and was also a Member of Legislative Council and later went on to become deputy chairman of the upper house during the same tenure.

== Birth and early childhood ==
Born on 15 November 1949 at Sarsamba village in Aland taluka current state of Karnataka. He is the third son of the Ramchandrappa M Patil and Gangabai R Patil, his father a revolutionary freedom fighter was part of a struggle against the brutal razakar army of the ruling Nizam, had celebrated the nations independence on 15 August 1947 even though the ruling Nizam had not acceded to India and thus was targeted by the Nizams army and had to escape to Gogaon which was in Bombay State. Ramachandrappa died when Bhojaraj was only 2, after that Gangabai brought her children up with great struggle and responsibility. By working hard in taking care of the 3 patches of farm land located distance apart and making sure that her two sons got their education and never bothering them with the struggles she was going through. Gangabai was religious and even though not having a any formal schooling was an ardent reader of puranas and other religious texts. In the absence of his father she had a very big influence on his early childhood with her display of strength against odds, religious dedication, discipline, generosity in giving, values and honesty. Another big influence was Gangabai's brother and his uncle Sharannappa Patil of Keshegaon, Maharashtra. Sharanabappa was a revolutionary too and a follower of Ramachandra before independence and a politician post independence. He became a father figure who transitioned the leadership qualities which he learnt through his brother-in-law Ramachandra to nephew Bhojaraj, thus becoming the bridge between the absent father and the young child.

Known to have been very active and naughty during his childhood, and also being observant at the same time of the day to day struggle of the villagers he slowly bloomed into a leader who wanted to bring changes to solve the problems that the villagers were facing. One of the earliest known incidents of his display of leadership was during his high school when he organized a group of young people to go in search of bootleggers and destroying their setup to make spurious liquor that had negative influence on the villagers.

== Constituency ==
He represented the Aland constituency.

== Political party ==
He is from the Indian National Congress Party.
