= Subhash Guttedar =

Indian politician

Member of the Karnataka Legislative Assembly
- In office 2018–2023
- Preceded by: B. R. Patil
- Succeeded by: B. R. Patil
- Constituency: Aland
- In office 2008-2013
- Preceded by: B. R. Patil
- Succeeded by: B. R. Patil
- Constituency: Aland
- In office 1994-2004
- Preceded by: Sharanabasappa Mali Patil Dhangapur
- Succeeded by: B. R. Patil
- Constituency: Aland

Personal details
- Born: 29 May 1951 (age 74) Tadkal, Karnataka, India
- Party: Bharatiya Janata Party
- Other political affiliations: Janata Dal (Secular), Karnataka Congress Party

Subhash Rukmaiah Guttedar (Guttedar Subhash Rukmayya ) is an Indian politician and former Member of the Karnataka Legislative Assembly from Aland as a Bharatiya Janata Party member. He was elected to Karnataka Legislative Assembly (MLA) from Aland vidhana sabha constituency in the years 2008, 1999 and 1994 and in 2013 and 2004 Karnataka Legislative Assembly he lost from Aland vidhana sabha constituency. He has two sons, Santosh S Guttedar and Harshanand S Guttedar (Three times ZP Member) and one daughter.

== Political career ==
- 2018 - 2023 MLA Aland Vidhana Sabha constituency as BJP candidate.
- 2008 - 2013 MLA Aland Vidhana Sabha constituency as Janata Dal (Secular)
- 1999 - 2004 MLA Aland constituency as Janata Dal (Secular)
- 1994 - 1999 MLA Aland constituency as Karnataka Congress Party
- 2013 contested from Aland constituency to Karnataka Legislative Assembly as JD(S) candidate and lost.
- 2004 contested from Aland constituency to Karnataka Legislative Assembly as INC candidate and lost.
- 2023 contested from Aland constituency to Karnataka Legislative Assembly as BJP candidate and lost.
