= Kamalpur Baraila =

Kamalpur Baraila Kamālpur Barela
- Village
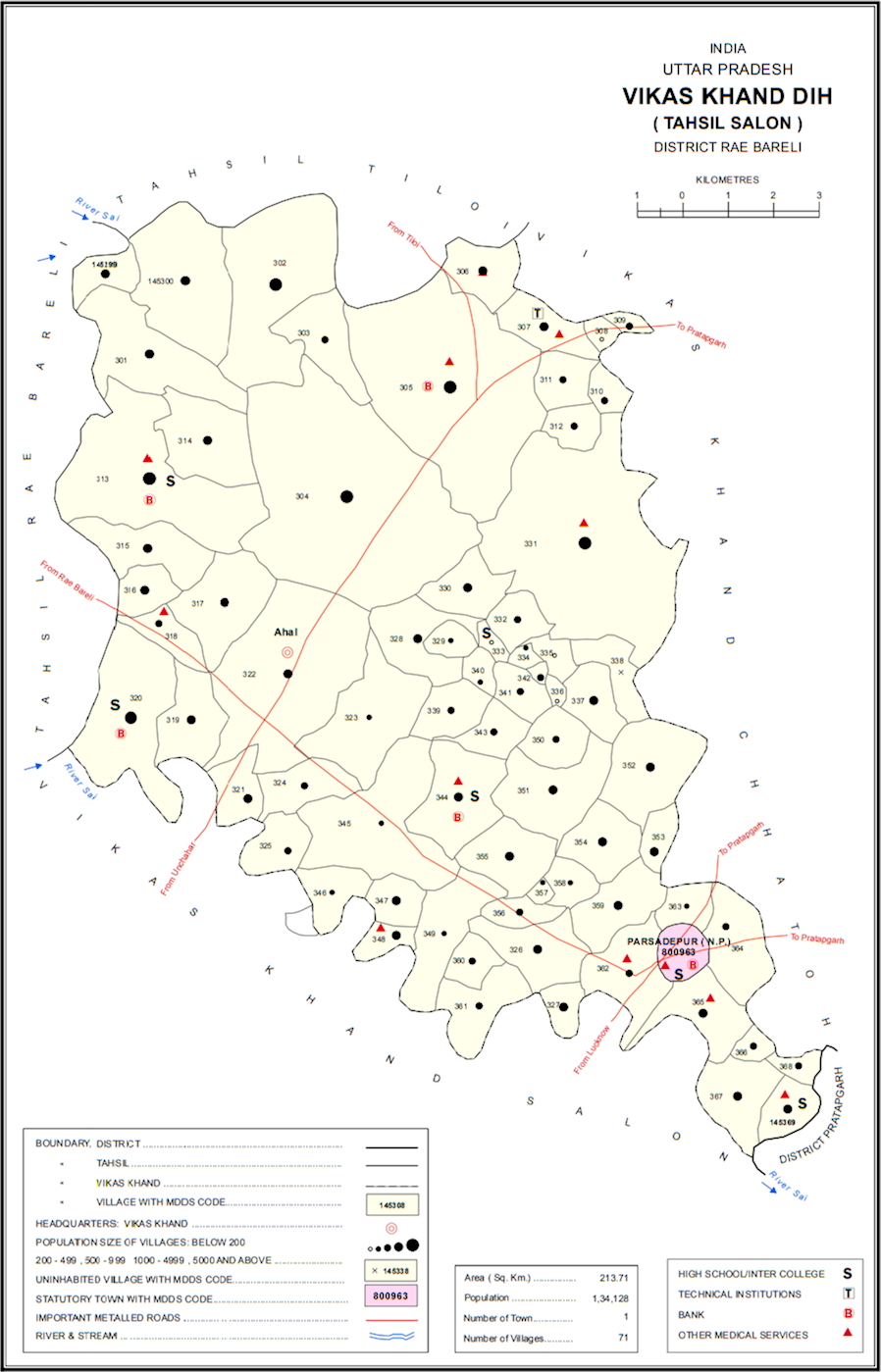
- Map showing Kamalpur Baraila (#330) in Dih CD block

- Location in Uttar Pradesh, India
- Coordinates: 26.158042°N 81.451164°E
- Country: India
- State: Uttar Pradesh
- District: Raebareli

Area
  - Total: 1.757 km^{2} (0.678 sq mi)

Population (2011)
  - Total: 1,174
  - Density: 668.2/km^{2} (1,731/sq mi)

Languages
  - Official: Hindi
- Time zone: UTC+5:30 (IST)
- Vehicle registration: UP-35

Kamalpur Baraila is a village in Dih block of Rae Bareli district, Uttar Pradesh, India. It is located 25 km from Raebareli, the district headquarters. As of 2011, it has a population of 1,174 people, in 197 households. It has one primary school and no healthcare facilities, and it does not host a permanent market or a weekly haat. It belongs to the nyaya panchayat of Birnawan.

The 1951 census recorded Kamalpur Baraila (as "Kamalpur Barela") as comprising 2 hamlets, with a total population of 398 people (191 male and 207 female), in 96 households and 93 physical houses. The area of the village was given as 412 acres. 13 residents were literate, all male. The village was listed as belonging to the pargana of Rokha and the thana of Nasirabad.

The 1961 census recorded Kamalpur Baraila as comprising 2 hamlets, with a total population of 503 people (258 male and 245 female), in 112 households and 112 physical houses. The area of the village was given as 412 acres.

The 1981 census recorded Kamalpur Baraila (as "Kamalpur Barela") as having a population of 625 people, in 153 households, and having an area of 166.73 hectares. The main staple foods were listed as wheat and rice.

The 1991 census recorded Kamalpur Baraila as having a total population of 803 people (418 male and 385 female), in 165 households and 165 physical houses. The area of the village was listed as 175 hectares. Members of the 0-6 age group numbered 167, or 21% of the total; this group was 50% male (84) and 50% female (83). Members of scheduled castes made up 33% of the village's population, while no members of scheduled tribes were recorded. The literacy rate of the village was 12.5% (90 men and 11 women). 290 people were classified as main workers (240 men and 50 women), while 9 people were classified as marginal workers (all women); the remaining 504 residents were non-workers. The breakdown of main workers by employment category was as follows: 155 cultivators (i.e. people who owned or leased their own land); 134 agricultural labourers (i.e. people who worked someone else's land in return for payment); 1 worker in livestock, forestry, fishing, hunting, plantations, orchards, etc.; 0 in mining and quarrying; 0 household industry workers; 0 workers employed in other manufacturing, processing, service, and repair roles; 0 construction workers; 0 employed in trade and commerce; 0 employed in transport, storage, and communications; and 0 in other services.
