= Kamalpur Assembly constituency =

Kamalpur Assembly constituency may refer to:

- Kamalpur, Assam Assembly constituency
- Kamalpur, Tripura Assembly constituency
- Kamalapur, Karnataka Assembly constituency, former constituency in Karnataka
- Kamalapur, Andhra Pradesh Assembly constituency, former constituency in Andhra Pradesh. Now in Telangana
- Kamalapuram Assembly constituency, Andhra Pradesh Assembly constituency
