= Kamalapuram, Mulugu district =

Kamalapuram
- village
- Location in Telangana State, India Kamalapuram (India)
- Coordinates: 18.2925°N 80.460833°E
- Country: India
- State: Telangana state
- District: Mulugu district

Government
  - Type: democracy

Population (2006)
  - Total: 16,000

Languages
  - Official: Telugu
- Time zone: UTC+5:30 (IST)
- PIN: 506172
- Telephone code: 91-08717
- Vehicle registration: TS-36
- Website: www.biltcsr.com/programms.asp?Locat=Kamalapuram

Kamalapuram is a panchayat in Mulugu district in the Indian state of Telangana.
