= Kamalapuram, Dindigul =

Coordinates: 10.233467°N 77.89783°E

Kamalapuram is a village in Dindigul district, Tamil Nadu, India. It was previously also called 'Adaikkala matha puram' (அடைக்கல மாதா புரம், the village of mary the refuge). It is located near Kodai Road (Kodaikanal road). This is an agricultural-based village which resides on foot of the Sirumalai hills (famous for sirmalai banana). This place is famous for grapes. The village is famous for its church and the annual car festival. People in and around nearby cities participate in the annual festive event which takes place for two days during the month of June. The grapes produced here are sent across India and also exported.
