= Mahagaon, Kalaburagi =

Mahagaon
- Village
- Location in Karnataka, India
- Coordinates: 17.52°N 76.91°E
- Country: India
- State: Karnataka
- District: Kalaburagi

Government
  - Type: Grampanchayat

Area
  - Total: 6 km^{2} (2.3 sq mi)

Population (2011)
  - Total: 8,731

Languages
  - Official: Kannada
- Time zone: UTC+5:30 (IST)
- PIN: 585 316
- 08472: 08472
- ISO 3166 code: IN-KA
- Vehicle registration: KA 32
- Website: karnataka.gov.in

Mahagaon is a village in the Kalaburagi district of the Indian state Karnataka. It is located about 25 km (16 miles) from Kalaburagi.

Mahagaon's early name was Mahaguna or Maha Gaon, meaning "big village".

During the Nizam of Hyderabad's rule, Mahagaon village was an administrative taluk of Hyderabad's north Kalaburagi district.

According to the 2011 census, Mahagaon has a total population of 8,731, of which 4,384 are men, and 4,347 are women.
