= Kamalpur, Gujarat =

Kamalpur
- village
- Country: India
- State: Gujarat
- District: Surendranagar

Population (2011)
  - Total: 914

Languages
  - Official: Gujarati
- Time zone: UTC+5:30 (IST)

Kamalpur is a village in Surendranagar district in the Indian state of Gujarat.
