= Kamalpur, Pakistan =

Kamalpur
- Village
- Chak Number 133 RB
- Location within Pakistan
- Coordinates: 30°53′05″N 72°26′25″E
- Country: Pakistan
- Province: Punjab
- District: Faisalabad
- Tehsil: Chak Jhumra
- Time zone: UTC+5 (PST)

Kamalpur is a village of Faisalabad District in the Punjab province of Pakistan, situated 9 kilometres (5.6 mi) from the Nankana-Shahkot road. This village is mainly populated by two major Jat sub-castes Cheema and Hunjra. Small pockets of the population are Lohar, Gujjar, Tarkhan, Mochi, Maachi, Chembay, and Christian communities.
