= Kamalpur Airport =

Airport of Tripura, India

Kamalpur Airport कमलपुर हवाई अड्डे
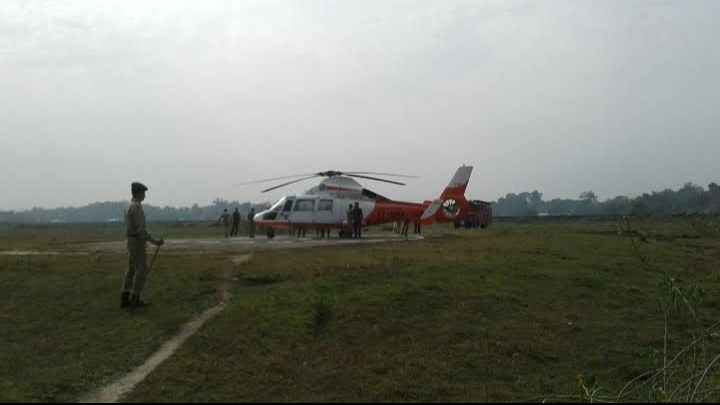
- IATA: IXQ; ICAO: VEKM

Summary
- Airport type: Public
- Operator: Airports Authority of India
- Serves: Kamalpur
- Location: Kamalpur, India
- Elevation AMSL: 40 m (130 ft)
- Coordinates: 24°07′54″N 091°48′51″E

Map
- Location of the airport in Tripura IXQ (India)

Runways
Direction	Length		Surface
Direction	m	ft	Surface
01/19	1,372	4,500	Asphalt

Kamalpur Airport is a small airport located in Kamalpur, Tripura, India. The airport is spread over an approximately 61 acre area. It is managed by the Airports Authority of India (AAI) and is non-operational. AAI plans to develop the airport for operation of ATR-42 and ATR-72 type of aircraft.

In the 1990s, Vayudoot used to fly its Dornier 228 aircraft from Agartala to Kamalpur.
