= Aland Assembly constituency =

Constituency of the Karnataka Legislative Assembly in India

Coordinates: 17.56°N 76.56°E

Aland
- Constituency No. 46 for the Karnataka Legislative Assembly

Constituency details
- Country: India
- Region: South India
- State: Karnataka
- District: Kalaburagi
- Lok Sabha constituency: Bidar
- Established: 1951
- Total electors: 241,750
- Reservation: None

Member of Legislative Assembly
- 16th Karnataka Legislative Assembly
- Incumbent B. R. Patil
- Party: Indian National Congress
- Elected year: 2023
- Preceded by: Subhash Guttedar

Aland Assembly constituency is one of the 224 Legislative Assembly constituencies of Karnataka state in India. It is in Kalaburagi district and is a part of Bidar Lok Sabha constituency.

== Members of the Legislative Assembly ==
Year	Member	Party
1952	Veerendra Patil	Indian National Congress
1957	Ramchandra Veerappa	Indian National Congress
1957	Chandrashekhar S. Patil	Indian National Congress
1961^ (Note: By-election was held due to death of Chandrashekhar S. Patil on 1961)	Lalitha Bai	Indian National Congress
1962	Devappa Shamanna	Indian National Congress
1967	D. R. B. Rao	Praja Socialist Party
1972	Anna Rao Veerbhadrappa	Indian National Congress
1978	Anna Rao Bhem Rao Patil Kotalli	Janata Party
1983	Bhojaraj Ramchandrappa Patil	Janata Party
1985	Sharnabassappa Mali Patil	Indian National Congress
1989	Sharnabassappa Mali Patil	Indian National Congress
1994	Subhash Guttedar	Karnataka Pradesh Congress Committee
1999	Subhash Guttedar	Janata Dal
2004	Bhojaraj Ramchandrappa Patil	Janata Dal
2008	Subhash Guttedar	Janata Dal
2013	Bhojaraj Ramchandrappa Patil	Karnataka Janata Paksha
2018	Subhash Guttedar	Bharatiya Janata Party
2023	Bhojaraj Ramchandrappa Patil	Indian National Congress

^ by-election

== Election results ==
=== Assembly Election 2023 ===
2023 Karnataka Legislative Assembly election : Aland
Party	Candidate	Votes	%	±%
INC	Bhojaraj Ramchandrappa Patil	89,508	51.27%	▲3.88
BJP	Subhash Guttedar	79,160	45.34%	▼2.49
JD(S)	Maheshwari	1,419	0.81%	▼0.05
NOTA	None of the above	1,316	0.75%	▼0.15
Margin of victory		10,348	5.93%	▲5.50
Turnout		175,715	72.68%	▲3.96
Total valid votes		174,588		
Registered electors		241,750		▲3.38
INC gain from BJP		Swing	▲3.44	

=== Assembly Election 2018 ===
2018 Karnataka Legislative Assembly election : Aland
Party	Candidate	Votes	%	±%
BJP	Subhash Guttedar	76,815	47.83%	▲46.13
INC	Bhojaraj Ramchandrappa Patil	76,118	47.39%	▲44.29
JD(U)	Arunkumar C. Patil Hallisalgar	2,213	1.38%	New
NOTA	None of the above	1,445	0.90%	New
JD(S)	Suryakant K. Koralli	1,387	0.86%	▼38.75
Margin of victory		697	0.43%	▼13.13
Turnout		160,689	68.72%	▼0.21
Total valid votes		160,609		
Registered electors		233,841		▲21.17
BJP gain from KJP		Swing	▼5.34	

=== Assembly Election 2013 ===
2013 Karnataka Legislative Assembly election : Aland
Party	Candidate	Votes	%	±%
KJP	Bhojaraj Ramchandrappa Patil	67,085	53.17%	New
JD(S)	Guttedar Subhash Rukmayya	49,971	39.61%	▲2.10
INC	Siddanna Master Shegaji	3,912	3.10%	▼29.25
Independent	Shankarrao. R. Patil	2,239	1.77%	New
BJP	Basavaraj. N. Pavadshetty	2,144	1.70%	▼7.18
Independent	Baburao Hanamant Nagure	1,865	1.48%	New
RSPS	D. K. Kokade	1,336	1.06%	New
BSRCP	Udayakumar. G. Biradar	835	0.66%	New
SP	K. M. Burle	812	0.64%	New
Margin of victory		17,114	13.56%	▲8.40
Turnout		133,039	68.93%	▲7.30
Total valid votes		126,172		
Registered electors		192,992		▲5.12
KJP gain from JD(S)		Swing	▲15.66	

=== Assembly Election 2008 ===
2008 Karnataka Legislative Assembly election : Aland
Party	Candidate	Votes	%	±%
JD(S)	Subhash Guttedar	42,425	37.51%	▼17.04
INC	Bhojaraj Ramchandrappa Patil	36,594	32.35%	▼6.28
BSP	Veeranna. S. Mangani	14,389	12.72%	▲10.45
BJP	Dr. B. G. Jawali	10,040	8.88%	New
Independent	Shivalingappa. E. Ashtagi	2,613	2.31%	New
CPI	Moula Mulla	2,140	1.89%	▼0.25
Independent	Shankarrao. R. Patil	1,361	1.20%	New
Independent	Shantala Swamirao Chanagund	827	0.73%	New
Margin of victory		5,831	5.16%	▼10.76
Turnout		113,146	61.63%	▲1.03
Total valid votes		113,107		
Registered electors		183,596		▲19.41
JD(S) hold		Swing	▼17.04	

=== Assembly Election 2004 ===
2004 Karnataka Legislative Assembly election : Aland
Party	Candidate	Votes	%	±%
JD(S)	Bhojaraj Ramchandrappa Patil	50,818	54.55%	▲15.66
INC	Guttedar Subhash Rukmayya	35,989	38.63%	▲22.76
BSP	Baslingappa Mallappa Gaikwad	2,113	2.27%	▲1.57
CPI	Moula Mulla	1,995	2.14%	▼0.79
Independent	Basavraj V. Diggavi	934	1.00%	New
JD(U)	Sidramappa B. Patil Dhangapur	755	0.81%	▼35.06
Independent	Apparao M. Patil Dargasiroor	563	0.60%	New
Margin of victory		14,829	15.92%	▲12.90
Turnout		93,167	60.60%	▼3.60
Total valid votes		93,167		
Registered electors		153,753		▲19.49
JD(S) hold		Swing	▲15.66	

=== Assembly Election 1999 ===
1999 Karnataka Legislative Assembly election : Aland
Party	Candidate	Votes	%	±%
JD(S)	Subhash Guttedar	29,762	38.89%	New
JD(U)	Bhojaraj Ramchandrappa Patil	27,451	35.87%	New
INC	Dr. Vijaya Digambar Rao Kalmankar	12,146	15.87%	▼1.74
Independent	Apparao Patil	4,083	5.33%	New
CPI	Moula Mulla	2,240	2.93%	New
BSP	Liyakat Ali	535	0.70%	New
Margin of victory		2,311	3.02%	▼21.44
Turnout		82,610	64.20%	▼0.51
Total valid votes		76,535		
Rejected ballots		6,033	7.30%	▲4.75
Registered electors		128,676		▲8.29
JD(S) gain from INC		Swing	▼8.56	

=== Assembly Election 1994 ===
1994 Karnataka Legislative Assembly election : Aland
Party	Candidate	Votes	%	±%
INC	Subhash Guttedar	35,549	47.45%	New
JD	Bhojaraj Ramchandrappa Patil	17,225	22.99%	▼7.47
INC	Mali Patil Sharan Basappa	13,191	17.61%	▼28.87
BJP	Gunde Rao Patil	8,565	11.43%	▲9.21
Margin of victory		18,324	24.46%	▲8.44
Turnout		76,890	64.71%	▲3.16
Total valid votes		74,918		
Rejected ballots		1,959	2.55%	▼4.27
Registered electors		118,822		▲11.64
INC gain from INC		Swing	▲0.97	

=== Assembly Election 1989 ===
1989 Karnataka Legislative Assembly election : Aland
Party	Candidate	Votes	%	±%
INC	Sharnabassappa Mali Patil	28,375	46.48%	▼2.94
JD	Basawaraj Malkajappa	18,596	30.46%	New
JP	Khiyatali	4,640	7.60%	New
Independent	Basanna Singe	4,022	6.59%	New
BJP	Jaga Devi	1,354	2.22%	▼0.11
Independent	Veeranna Kadgancchi	1,132	1.85%	New
Independent	M. Patil Hanmanthrao	1,036	1.70%	New
SS	Chandrakant	711	1.16%	New
Bharatiya Minorities Suraksha Mahasangh	Basana Ghorpade	702	1.15%	New
Margin of victory		9,779	16.02%	▲14.86
Turnout		65,516	61.55%	▼5.42
Total valid votes		61,048		
Rejected ballots		4,468	6.82%	▲4.32
Registered electors		106,436		▲22.27
INC hold		Swing	▼2.94	

=== Assembly Election 1985 ===
1985 Karnataka Legislative Assembly election : Aland
Party	Candidate	Votes	%	±%
INC	Sharnabassappa Mali Patil	28,085	49.42%	▲12.19
JP	Bhojaraj Ramchandrappa Patil	27,423	48.25%	▲3.32
BJP	Hatti Sharanappa Chandrasha	1,324	2.33%	▼2.44
Margin of victory		662	1.16%	▼6.54
Turnout		58,292	66.97%	▲7.89
Total valid votes		56,832		
Rejected ballots		1,460	2.50%	▼0.98
Registered electors		87,047		▲14.33
INC gain from JP		Swing	▲4.49	

=== Assembly Election 1983 ===
1983 Karnataka Legislative Assembly election : Aland
Party	Candidate	Votes	%	±%
JP	Bhojaraj Ramchandrappa Patil	19,507	44.93%	▼11.60
INC	B. B. Patil Okaly	16,163	37.23%	▲30.29
LKD	Jagadev. B. Nigudagi	3,143	7.24%	New
BJP	Chillal Dattatraya Ambadas	2,073	4.77%	New
Independent	Kambale Revappa Kallappa	1,519	3.50%	New
Independent	S. S. Dudhani	743	1.71%	New
Independent	Hanumantha Rao Sharanappa	270	0.62%	New
Margin of victory		3,344	7.70%	▼12.29
Turnout		44,982	59.08%	▼7.42
Total valid votes		43,418		
Rejected ballots		1,564	3.48%	▲0.10
Registered electors		76,139		▲5.41
JP hold		Swing	▼11.60	

=== Assembly Election 1978 ===
1978 Karnataka Legislative Assembly election : Aland
Party	Candidate	Votes	%	±%
JP	Anna Rao Bhem Rao Patil Kotalli	26,232	56.53%	New
INC(I)	Digamber Rao Balwant Rao Kalmanker	16,956	36.54%	New
INC	M. Patil Gurushantappa	3,219	6.94%	▼66.84
Margin of victory		9,276	19.99%	▼29.21
Turnout		48,031	66.50%	▼1.05
Total valid votes		46,407		
Rejected ballots		1,624	3.38%	▲3.38
Registered electors		72,229		▲8.16
JP gain from INC		Swing	▼17.25	

=== Assembly Election 1972 ===
1972 Mysore State Legislative Assembly election : Aland
Party	Candidate	Votes	%	±%
INC	Anna Rao Veerbhadrappa	32,181	73.78%	▲24.38
INC(O)	Anna Rao Bhim Rao	10,721	24.58%	New
ABJS	Shankar Rao Sidgeerappa	717	1.64%	New
Margin of victory		21,460	49.20%	▲47.99
Turnout		45,108	67.55%	▲6.26
Total valid votes		43,619		
Registered electors		66,779		▲21.60
INC gain from PSP		Swing	▲23.18	

=== Assembly Election 1967 ===
1967 Mysore State Legislative Assembly election : Aland
Party	Candidate	Votes	%	±%
PSP	D. R. B. Rao	15,916	50.60%	▲27.42
INC	A. R. B. Rao	15,536	49.40%	▼15.71
Margin of victory		380	1.21%	▼40.72
Turnout		33,658	61.29%	▲22.36
Total valid votes		31,452		
Registered electors		54,916		▲10.82
PSP gain from INC		Swing	▼14.51	

=== Assembly Election 1962 ===
1962 Mysore State Legislative Assembly election : Aland
Party	Candidate	Votes	%	±%
INC	Devappa Shamanna	11,631	65.11%	New
PSP	B. Shamsunder	4,141	23.18%	New
RPI	Shivaram Sambu	2,092	11.71%	New
Margin of victory		7,490	41.93%	
Turnout		19,289	38.93%	
Total valid votes		17,864		
Registered electors		49,554		
INC hold		Swing		

=== Assembly By-election 1961 ===
1961 Mysore State Legislative Assembly by-election : Aland
Party	Candidate	Votes	%	±%
INC	Lalitha Bai	Unopposed		
INC hold		Swing		

=== Assembly Election 1957 ===
1957 Mysore State Legislative Assembly election : Aland
Party	Candidate	Votes	%	±%
INC	Ramchandra Veerappa	18,920	29.18%	▼21.62
INC	Chandrashekhar S. Patil	16,393	25.28%	▼25.52
PSP	Shivaram Sambu	11,911	18.37%	New
PSP	Hanumantha Rao Sharanappa	8,872	13.68%	New
Independent	Bhimsha Mareppa	8,747	13.49%	New
Margin of victory		7,009	10.81%	▼2.07
Turnout		64,843	38.36%	▲7.82
Total valid votes		64,843		
Registered electors		84,528		▲76.80
INC hold		Swing	▼21.62	

=== Assembly Election 1952 ===
1952 Hyderabad State Legislative Assembly election : Aland
Party	Candidate	Votes	%	±%
INC	Veerendra Patil	7,417	50.80%	New
Independent	Anna Rao Veerbhadrappa	5,536	37.92%	New
Socialist Party (India)	Hanumantha Rao Sharanappa	1,648	11.29%	New
Margin of victory		1,881	12.88%	
Turnout		14,601	30.54%	
Total valid votes		14,601		
Registered electors		47,809		
INC win (new seat)				

== See also ==
- Kalaburagi district
- Alanda
- Kalaburagi district
- List of constituencies of Karnataka Legislative Assembly
