= Kotha Kamalapuram =

- Village
- Location in Telangana, India
- Coordinates: 17.45°N 80.21°E
- Country: India
- State: Telangana
- District: Khammam district

Government
  - Type: Panchayat

Population (2011)
  - Total: 1,621

Languages
  - Official: Telugu
- Time zone: UTC+5:30 (IST)
- PIN: 507122 and 507210
- Mandal (sub-division): Singareni
- Lok Sabha constituency: Khammam

Kotha Kamalapuram is a panchayat in the Singareni mandal of the Khammam district in the Indian state of Telangana.

== Geography ==
Kotha Kamalapuram is located 27 km North of district headquarters Khammam and 10 km from madal headquarters Singareni. The neighbouring villages of Kotha Kamalapuram are Pulluru of Dornakal mandal, Pocharam of Garla mandal and Gate karepalli and Patha Kamalapuram villages of Singareni mandal.
