= Kamalpur, Jalandhar =

Kamalpur
- Village
- Mothanwala
- Location in Punjab, India Kamalpur (India)
- Country: India
- State: Punjab
- District: Kapurthala

Government
  - Type: Panchayat raj
  - Body: Gram panchayat

Languages
  - Official: Punjabi
- Time zone: UTC+5:30 (IST)
- ISO 3166 code: IN-PB
- Vehicle registration: PB-09

Kamalpur is a village in Kapurthala district of Punjab State, India. (Village Kamalpur, Post Office Mothanwala, Tehsil Sultanpur Lodhi, District Kapurthala) The village is administered by the sarpanch S.Gurpreet Singh, who is an elected representative of the village as per Panchayati raj 2025.
