= Kamalpur, Tripura =

Kamalpur, India
- Town
- Location in Tripura, India Kamalpur, India (India)
- Coordinates: 24.19768°N 91.83487°E
- Country: India
- State: Tripura
- District: Dhalai

Government
  - Type: Nagar Panchayat
  - Body: Kamalpur Nagar Panchayat
  - Chairman: Prasanta Sinha (BJP)
- Elevation: 16 m (52 ft)

Population (2011)
  - Total: 10,904
- Demonym: Kamalpurbashi

Languages
  - Official: Bengali, Kokborok, English
- Time zone: UTC+5:30 (IST)
- Postal code: 799285 - 799286
- Telephone code: +03826
- Vehicle registration: TR 04
- Lok Sabha constituency: Tripura East
- Vidhan Sabha constituency: Kamalpur
- Precipitation: 2,081 mm (82 in)
- Avg. annual temperature: 24.5 °C (76 °F)
- Website: tripura.gov.in

Kamalpur is a town and a Nagar Panchayat in Dhalai District in the Indian state of Tripura around 93 km from the state capital Agartala. It is the largest Sub-divisional town in Dhalai District.

== Geography ==
Kamalpur is the oldest and biggest town of Dhalai District. It is situated on the bank of Dhalai river. It is mainly located between two hills: Atharamura Range & Longtorai Range at 24.19768°N 91.83487°E. & 16 meter above from the Mean Sea Level. The town share 53 km International border with neighbour country Bangladesh.

== Climate ==
This place has a tropical climate with hot and humid summers, a prolonged rainy season and warm winters. Rains are frequent in March and April. Maximum temperatures in summers and winters are 36 degree and 28 degree Celsius respectively. The minimum temperatures in summers and winters are 17 degree and 5.3 degree Celsius respectively.

== Demographics ==
As of 2011 India census, Kamalpur had a population of 10,872 of which 5,479 are males while 5,393 are females as per report released by Census India 2011. The population of children aged 0–6 is 988 which is 9.09% of total population of Kamalpur (NP). In Kamalpur Nagar Panchayat, the female sex ratio is 984 against state average of 960. Moreover, the child sex ratio in Kamalpur is around 900 compared to Tripura state average of 957. Kamalpur has an average literacy rate of 97.77 higher than the national average of 87.22% In Kamalpur, male literacy is around 98.61% while the female literacy rate is 96.93%.

== Politics ==
Kamalpur assembly constituency is part of Tripura East (Lok Sabha constituency). In Tripura assembly election it is part of Kamalpur (45) constituency. Kamalpur Nagar Panchayat constitutes 11 wards.

== Education ==
- There is only Two college present

1. Kamalpur Govt Degree College

2. District Institute for Education & Training

- There are many higher schools some school are

1. Kamalpur Class XII School, Kamalpur

2. Krishna Chandra Girls School, Kamalpur

3. Kamalpur Madrasha Class XII School, Kamalpur

4. Hararkola Class XII School, Herarkhola

5. Kalachari Class XII School, Kalachari No. 1

6. Harachandra Class XII School, Manikbhandar

7. Kamalpur Govt. English Medium School, Kamalpur

8. Fulchuri Class XII School, Fulchuri

Relation English Medium School, Rudreswar Das Memorial Institution of Manikbhandar are two very popular English medium school in Kamalpur sub-division

== Economy ==
Mainly agriculture based with several micro- and small-scale industrial units. There is one tea garden named Ramdurlabpur Tea Estate. Rubber plantation scattered in various areas. Major market area is Kamalpur town and other small market places are in Fulchari, college chowmuhani, Kalachari and Manikbhandar.

== Health care system ==
Only one sub-divisional hospital named Bimal Sinha Memorial Hospital.

== Transport ==
Road connectivity is present with Ambassa, Agartala, Khowai, Kumarghat. Nearest railway station is Ambassa railway station. Kamalpur Airport which serves Kamalpur is currently non-operational.

== Culture ==
There is majority of people are follow Hinduism. Majority of people are Bengali; but other religion's people like Muslim, Christian people are also live in this place. The main festival of the town is Durga puja being celebrate every year, others are Diwali, Holi, Laxmi Puja, Saraswati Puja etc. are also celebrate in Kamalpur. Kamleshwari Kali Mandir situated in Kamalpur, is also one of the oldest (more than 100 year) temple in Tripura.

== See also ==
- List of cities and towns in Tripura
