= Birnawan, Dih, Raebareli =

Birnawan
- Village
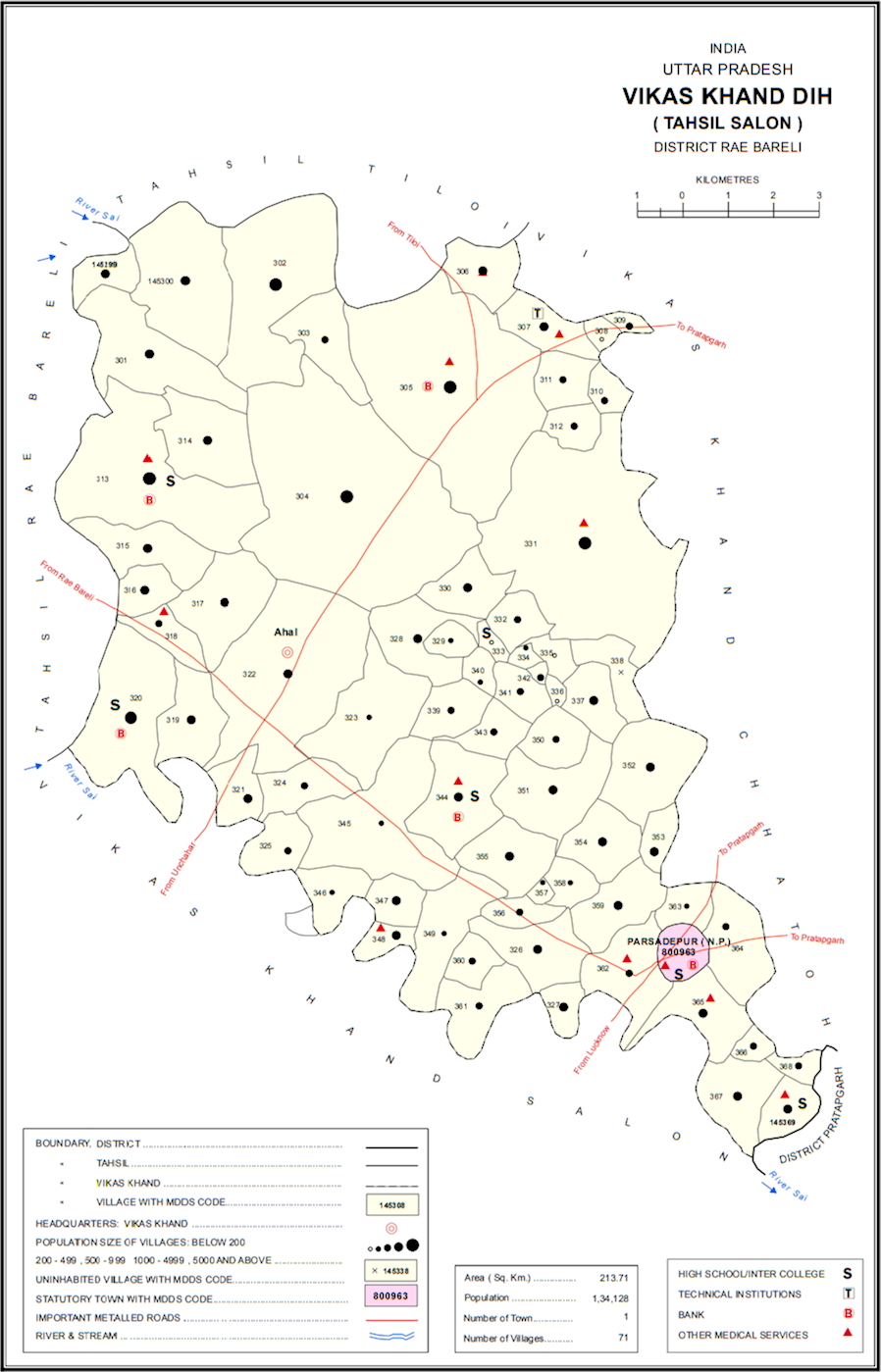
- Map showing Birnawan (#331) in Dih CD block

- Location in Uttar Pradesh, India
- Coordinates: 26.158408°N 81.482773°E
- Country India: India
- State: Uttar Pradesh
- District: Raebareli

Area
  - Total: 16.033 km^{2} (6.190 sq mi)

Population (2011)
  - Total: 10,295
  - Density: 642.11/km^{2} (1,663.1/sq mi)

Languages
  - Official: Hindi
- Time zone: UTC+5:30 (IST)
- Vehicle registration: UP-35

Birnawan is a village in Dih block of Rae Bareli district, Uttar Pradesh, India. It is located 25 km from Raebareli, the district headquarters. As of 2011, it has a population of 10,295 people, in 1,815 households. It has 5 primary schools and 1 primary health sub centre. It is the headquarters of a nyaya panchayat that also includes 10 other villages.

The 1951 census recorded Birnawan as comprising 49 hamlets, with a total population of 4,164 people (2,133 male and 2,031 female), in 973 households and 953 physical houses. The area of the village was given as 3,964 acres. 157 residents were literate, 149 male and 8 female. The village was listed as belonging to the pargana of Rokha and the thana of Nasirabad.

The 1961 census recorded Birnawan (as "Birnwan") as comprising 43 hamlets, with a total population of 4,885 people (2,517 male and 2,368 female), in 1,100 households and 1,078 physical houses. The area of the village was given as 4,954 acres.

The 1981 census recorded Birnawan as having a population of 6,284 people, in 1,700 households, and having an area of 1,604.18 hectares. The main staple foods were given as wheat and rice.

The 1991 census recorded Birnawan (as "Birnanan") as having a total population of 7,484 people (3,772 male and 3,712 female), in 1,492 households and 1,485 physical houses. The area of the village was listed as 1,554 hectares. Members of the 0-6 age group numbered 1,445, or 19% of the total; this group was 48% male (697) and 52% female (748). Members of scheduled castes made up 34% of the village's population, while no members of scheduled tribes were recorded. The literacy rate of the village was 16% (1,023 men and 203 women). 2,128 people were classified as main workers (1,963 men and 165 women), while 580 people were classified as marginal workers (54 men and 536 women); the remaining 4,766 residents were non-workers. The breakdown of main workers by employment category was as follows: 1,586 cultivators (i.e. people who owned or leased their own land); 273 agricultural labourers (i.e. people who worked someone else's land in return for payment); 3 workers in livestock, forestry, fishing, hunting, plantations, orchards, etc.; 0 in mining and quarrying; 21 household industry workers; 6 workers employed in other manufacturing, processing, service, and repair roles; 3 construction workers; 37 employed in trade and commerce; 5 employed in transport, storage, and communications; and 94 in other services.
