= Kamalapura, Vijayanagara =

Kamalapura
- town
- Location in Karnataka, India
- Coordinates: 15.306°N 76.477°E
- Country: India
- State: Karnataka
- District: Vijayanagara

Languages
  - Official: Kannada
- Time zone: UTC+5:30 (IST)
- PIN: 583221
- Telephone code: 08394
- Vehicle registration: KA35

Kamalapura (also Kamalapur and Kamalapuram) is a panchayat town in Vijayanagara district in Karnataka. It is located near the industrial city of Hosapete, and lies within the ruins of the old city of Vijayanagara, just outside the original 'Royal Centre'. Its main products which are rice, banana, and sugar cane. It has a small but significant archaeological museum, and lies within the environs of Kannada University. he village is about 4 km south of the larger Hampi temple complex and the Tungabhadra River. It is flanked by three reservoirs and a canal system; one large tank, Kamalapura Kere, lies to the south of the village.

The archeological and anthropological museum features numerous items from both the immediate ruins and the surrounding region. These include many images of Durga, and also the Lakshmi statue associated with the monolithic Narasimha of Vijayanagara. There is a scale model of the entire city centre of Vijayanagara within museum courtyard. Images and details of early and prehistoric man in the region are also featured.
