= Kamalapur, Karnataka Assembly constituency =

Former Assembly constituency in Karnataka, India

Coordinates: 17.582441°N 76.983282°E

Kamalapur
- Former constituency for the Karnataka Legislative Assembly

Constituency details
- Country: India
- Region: South India
- State: Karnataka
- Division: Gulbarga
- District: Gulbarga
- Lok Sabha constituency: Bidar
- Established: 1951
- Abolished: 2008
- Reservation: SC

Kamalapur Assembly constituency was one of the constituencies in Karnataka state assembly in India until 2008 when it was made defunct. It was part of Bidar Lok Sabha constituency.

== Members of the Legislative Assembly ==
Election	Member	Party
1952	Chandrashekhar S. Patil	Indian National Congress
1962	L. Chandrashekhar	Indian National Congress
1967	L. Chandrashekhar	Indian National Congress
1972	Subhash Shankershetty	Indian National Congress
1978	Govind. P. Vadeyraj	Janata Party
1983	Govind. P. Vadeyraj	Indian National Congress
1985	G. Ramkrishna	Indian National Congress
1989	G. Ramkrishna	Indian National Congress
1994	Revu Naik Belamgi	Bharatiya Janata Party
1999	Revu Naik Belamgi	Bharatiya Janata Party
2004	Revu Naik Belamgi	Bharatiya Janata Party

== Election results ==
=== Assembly Election 2004 ===
2004 Karnataka Legislative Assembly election : Kamalapur
Party	Candidate	Votes	%	±%
BJP	Revu Naik Belamgi	28,607	37.30%	▼2.36
INC	G. Ramkrishna	23,740	30.95%	▲3.60
CPI(M)	Maruti Manpade	15,296	19.94%	▼0.29
BSP	Bharati Kannur. S. G	4,557	5.94%	▲4.06
RPI	Kashappa Shantappa Gaure	1,220	1.59%	New
Kannada Nadu Party	Tapasuram Rathod	1,040	1.36%	New
Independent	Basavaraj Anvarkar	958	1.25%	New
JP	Lakshman Nayak	725	0.95%	New
Urs Samyuktha Paksha	Savita Heeramani Rathod	559	0.73%	New
Margin of victory		4,867	6.35%	▼5.97
Turnout		76,715	52.72%	▼5.74
Total valid votes		76,702		
Registered electors		145,502		▲16.53
BJP hold		Swing	▼2.36	

=== Assembly Election 1999 ===
1999 Karnataka Legislative Assembly election : Kamalapur
Party	Candidate	Votes	%	±%
BJP	Revu Naik Belamgi	27,531	39.66%	▲9.89
INC	G. Ramkrishna	18,981	27.35%	▲6.13
CPI(M)	Maruti Manpade	14,043	20.23%	▲0.76
JD(S)	Subhash V. Rathod	6,231	8.98%	New
BSP	Mahadevi H. Bhimapure	1,302	1.88%	▲1.00
SP	Tippanna Wadairaj	931	1.34%	New
Margin of victory		8,550	12.32%	▲3.77
Turnout		72,993	58.46%	▲2.47
Total valid votes		69,410		
Rejected ballots		3,583	4.91%	▲1.59
Registered electors		124,862		▲3.78
BJP hold		Swing	▲9.89	

=== Assembly Election 1994 ===
1994 Karnataka Legislative Assembly election : Kamalapur
Party	Candidate	Votes	%	±%
BJP	Revu Naik Belamgi	19,389	29.77%	▲28.25
INC	G. Ramakrishna	13,818	21.22%	▼16.06
JD	Vithal Doddamani	13,809	21.20%	New
CPI(M)	Maruti Manpade	12,681	19.47%	New
INC	Sunil Vallyapur	3,292	5.06%	New
BSP	Hata Gundi Arjun	574	0.88%	New
Margin of victory		5,571	8.55%	▼1.66
Turnout		67,359	55.99%	▲3.11
Total valid votes		65,123		
Rejected ballots		2,236	3.32%	▼6.64
Registered electors		120,316		▲9.54
BJP gain from INC		Swing	▼7.51	

=== Assembly Election 1989 ===
1989 Karnataka Legislative Assembly election : Kamalapur
Party	Candidate	Votes	%	±%
INC	G. Ramkrishna	19,496	37.28%	▲1.03
Independent	Vithal Doddamani	14,159	27.07%	New
JP	Ashok Lakhe	9,999	19.12%	New
Independent	Sagar. D. G	6,387	12.21%	New
Independent	K. Bheemrao	999	1.91%	New
BJP	Kupendra Singe	796	1.52%	▼0.50
Independent	Khem Singh	460	0.88%	New
Margin of victory		5,337	10.21%	▲4.74
Turnout		58,084	52.88%	▲5.44
Total valid votes		52,296		
Rejected ballots		5,788	9.96%	▲7.55
Registered electors		109,833		▲24.74
INC hold		Swing	▲1.03	

=== Assembly Election 1985 ===
1985 Karnataka Legislative Assembly election : Kamalapur
Party	Candidate	Votes	%	±%
INC	G. Ramkrishna	14,778	36.25%	▼12.48
JP	Vithal Doddamani	12,546	30.77%	▼4.72
Independent	T. N. Rathod	11,767	28.86%	New
Independent	Sujatha Parameshwar Jane	855	2.10%	New
BJP	Hanmanthrao Nagappa Vante	823	2.02%	New
Margin of victory		2,232	5.47%	▼7.77
Turnout		41,774	47.44%	▼3.03
Total valid votes		40,769		
Rejected ballots		1,005	2.41%	▼0.95
Registered electors		88,049		▲11.15
INC hold		Swing	▼12.48	

=== Assembly Election 1983 ===
1983 Karnataka Legislative Assembly election : Kamalapur
Party	Candidate	Votes	%	±%
INC	Govind. P. Vadeyraj	18,830	48.73%	▲45.56
JP	Shamarao Pyati	13,713	35.49%	▼16.10
LKD	Gundappa Chandappa	3,246	8.40%	New
Independent	Sadashiva Mapanna	947	2.45%	New
Independent	Rukkanna. R. Hatagundi	792	2.05%	New
Independent	Bhimasha Singe	756	1.96%	New
Independent	Dharamaraj Hanumanand	355	0.92%	New
Margin of victory		5,117	13.24%	▲0.27
Turnout		39,984	50.47%	▼11.66
Total valid votes		38,639		
Rejected ballots		1,345	3.36%	▼0.08
Registered electors		79,219		▲6.09
INC gain from JP		Swing	▼2.86	

=== Assembly Election 1978 ===
1978 Karnataka Legislative Assembly election : Kamalapur
Party	Candidate	Votes	%	±%
JP	Govind. P. Vadeyraj	23,110	51.59%	New
INC(I)	Narsing Rao Jadhav	17,301	38.62%	New
RPI(K)	Gundappa Revappa Kahmas	1,840	4.11%	New
INC	Gundappa Korwar	1,419	3.17%	▼67.14
Independent	Gundappa Chandappa Bablad	909	2.03%	New
Margin of victory		5,809	12.97%	▼27.64
Turnout		46,391	62.13%	▲12.75
Total valid votes		44,795		
Rejected ballots		1,596	3.44%	▲3.44
Registered electors		74,673		▲12.32
JP gain from INC		Swing	▼18.72	

=== Assembly Election 1972 ===
1972 Mysore State Legislative Assembly election : Kamalapur
Party	Candidate	Votes	%	±%
INC	Subhash Shankershetty	22,196	70.31%	▲23.96
SSP	Hanmanth Rao Sharnappa	9,375	29.69%	New
Margin of victory		12,821	40.61%	▲26.43
Turnout		32,827	49.38%	▼5.95
Total valid votes		31,571		
Registered electors		66,481		▲23.53
INC hold		Swing	▲23.96	

=== Assembly Election 1967 ===
1967 Mysore State Legislative Assembly election : Kamalapur
Party	Candidate	Votes	%	±%
INC	L. Chandrashekhar	12,682	46.35%	▼23.25
Independent	S. Shankershetty	8,801	32.17%	New
SSP	H. Sharnappa	5,879	21.49%	New
Margin of victory		3,881	14.18%	▼36.44
Turnout		29,779	55.33%	▲10.75
Total valid votes		27,362		
Registered electors		53,819		▲6.96
INC hold		Swing	▼23.25	

=== Assembly Election 1962 ===
1962 Mysore State Legislative Assembly election : Kamalapur
Party	Candidate	Votes	%	±%
INC	L. Chandrashekhar	14,484	69.60%	▼17.01
PSP	Hanmanth Rao Sharnappa	3,949	18.98%	New
RPI	Laxman Rao Lakkappa	2,377	11.42%	New
Margin of victory		10,535	50.62%	▼22.61
Turnout		22,430	44.58%	▲15.43
Total valid votes		20,810		
Registered electors		50,318		▼12.11
INC hold		Swing	▼17.01	

=== Assembly Election 1952 ===
1952 Hyderabad State Legislative Assembly election : Kamalapur
Party	Candidate	Votes	%	±%
INC	Chandrashekhar S. Patil	14,455	86.61%	New
Socialist Party (India)	Shivalingappa Bandak	2,234	13.39%	New
Margin of victory		12,221	73.23%	
Turnout		16,689	29.15%	
Total valid votes		16,689		
Registered electors		57,252		
INC win (new seat)				

== See also ==
- List of constituencies of the Karnataka Legislative Assembly
