= 2016 elections in India =

Elections in India
- 2016

The 2016 elections in India include the five state legislative assembly elections. The tenure of the state legislative assembly of Tamil Nadu, West Bengal, Kerala, Puducherry, and Assam expired during the year. More than 18,000 voter-verified paper audit trails (VVPATs) in 64 Assembly constituencies were used in these 5 elections. The dates of these elections were announced on 4 March 2016.

== Lok Sabha by-elections ==
Date	S.No	Constituency	State/UT	MP before election	Party before election	Elected MP	Party after election	Remarks
16 May 2016	1.	Tura	Meghalaya	P. A. Sangma	National People's Party	Conrad Sangma	National People's Party	Due To Demise of P. A. Sangma
19 November 2016	14.	Lakhimpur	Assam	Sarbananda Sonowal	Bharatiya Janata Party	Pradan Baruah	Bharatiya Janata Party	Due To Resignation of Sarbananda Sonowal
19 November 2016	12.	Shahdol	Madhya Pradesh	Dalpat Singh Paraste	Bharatiya Janata Party	Gyan Singh	Bharatiya Janata Party	Due To Demise of Dalpat Singh Paraste
19 November 2016	1.	Cooch Behar	West Bengal	Renuka Sinha	Trinamool Congress	Partha Pratim Roy	Trinamool Congress	Due To Demise of Renuka Sinha
19 November 2016	30.	Tamluk	West Bengal	Suvendu Adhikari	Trinamool Congress	Dibyendu Adhikari	Trinamool Congress	Due To Resignation of Suvendu Adhikari

== Legislative assembly elections ==
Start date	End date	State	Government before	Chief Minister before	Government after	Elected Chief Minister
4 April 2016	11 April 2016	Assam	Indian National Congress	Tarun Gogoi	Bharatiya Janata Party	Sarbananda Sonowal
4 April 2016	11 April 2016	Assam	Indian National Congress	Tarun Gogoi	Asom Gana Parishad	Sarbananda Sonowal
4 April 2016	11 April 2016	Assam	Indian National Congress	Tarun Gogoi	Bodoland People's Front	Sarbananda Sonowal
4 April 2016	5 May 2016	West Bengal	All India Trinamool Congress	Mamata Banerjee	All India Trinamool Congress	Mamata Banerjee
16 May 2016		Kerala	Indian National Congress	Oommen Chandy	Communist Party of India (Marxist)	Pinarayi Vijayan
16 May 2016		Puducherry	All India N. R. Congress	N. Rangaswamy	Indian National Congress	V. Narayanasamy
16 May 2016		Puducherry	All India N. R. Congress	N. Rangaswamy	Dravida Munnetra Kazhagam	V. Narayanasamy
16 May 2016		Tamil Nadu	All India Anna Dravida Munnetra Kazhagam	J. Jayalalithaa	All India Anna Dravida Munnetra Kazhagam	J. Jayalalithaa

=== Assam ===
The tenure of the Legislative Assembly of Assam expired on June 5, 2016. The polls for the incumbent assembly were held in two phases on April 4 and 11 2016 to elect members of the 126 constituencies in Assam. BJP won 60 seats and became biggest party in the election.

Alliance	Party	Popular vote			Seats		
Alliance	Party	Vote	%	±pp	Contested	Won	+/-
NDA	Bharatiya Janata Party	4,992,185	29.51	▲18.04	84	60	▲55
NDA	Asom Gana Parishad	1,377,482	8.14	▼8.15	24	14	▲4
NDA	Bodoland People's Front	666,057	3.94	▼2.19	16	12	Steady
NDA	Total	7,035,724	41.59	▲7.70	126	86	▲59
UPA	Indian National Congress	5,238,655	30.96	▼8.43	122	26	▼52
None	All India United Democratic Front	2,207,945	13.05	▲0.48	74	13	▼5
None	Independents	1,867,531	11.04	▲1.90	496	1	▼2
None	others	569,509	3.36			0	
Total		16,919,364	100	N/A		126	
Valid votes		16,919,364	99.95				
Invalid votes		7,597	0.05				
Votes cast / turnout		16,926,961	84.67				
Abstentions		3,063,794	15.33				
Registered voters		19,990,755					

=== West Bengal ===
The tenure of the Legislative Assembly of West Bengal expired on May 29, 2016. Like in 2011, the polls for the next assembly were held in six phases. The first phase, held in Naxal-affected areas, had two polling dates — April 4 and April 11. The other phases were held on April 17, 21, 25, 30 and May 5.

West Bengal election results were announced along with other four assemblies on 19 May 2016. All India Trinamool Congress under Mamata Banerjee won 211 seats, and thus was reelected with an enhanced majority.

Parties and coalitions	2016 West Bengal Bidhan Sabha Election			Seats		
Parties and coalitions	Votes	%	±pp	Contested	Won	+/−
All India Trinamool Congress (AITC)	24,564,523	44.91	▲	293	211	▲27
Communist Party of India (Marxist) (CPM)	10,802,058	19.75	▼	148	26	▼14
Indian National Congress (INC)	6,700,938	12.25	▲	92	44	▲2
Bharatiya Janata Party (BJP)	5,555,134	10.16	▲	291	3	▲3
All India Forward Bloc (AIFB)	1,543,764	2.82	▼1.98	25	2	▼9
Independents (IND)	1,184,047	2.16	▼0.97	371	1	▼1
Revolutionary Socialist Party (RSP)	911,004	1.67	▼1.33	19	3	▼4
Communist Party of India (CPI)	791,925	1.45	▼0.35	11	1	▼1
Socialist Unity Centre of India (SUCI)	365,996	0.67	▲0.23	182	0	▼1
Gorkha Janmukti Morcha (GOJAM)	254,626	0.47	▼0.25	5	3	Steady
Democratic Socialist Party (DSP)	167,576	0.31	▼0.04	2	0	▼1
Nationalist Congress Party (NCP)	69,898	0.13	▲0.10	1	0	Steady
Samajwadi Party (SP)	46,402	0.08	▼0.66	23	0	▼1
Rashtriya Janata Dal (RJD)	15,439	0.03	▼0.02	1	0	Steady
None of the Above (NOTA)	831,848	1.52	▲1.52			
Total	54,697,791	100.0		2255	294	±0
Valid votes	54,697,791	99.92				
Invalid votes	44,622	0.08				
Votes cast / turnout	54,742,413	83.02				
Abstentions	11,196,593	16.98				
Registered voters	65,939,006					

=== Kerala ===
The tenure of the Legislative Assembly of Kerala expired on May 31, 2016. The polls for the next assembly were held on 16 May 2016. The Left Democratic Front won a clear victory with 91 in 140 seats.

Parties and coalitions	Popular vote		Seats	
Parties and coalitions	Votes	%	Candidates	Won
Communist Party of India (Marxist)	5,365,472	26.7	84	59
Indian National Congress	4,794,793	23.8	87	21
Bharatiya Janata Party	2,129,726	10.6	98	1
Communist Party of India	1,643,878	8.2	25	19
Indian Union Muslim League	1,496,864	7.4	23	18
Kerala Congress (Mani)	807,718	4.0	15	5
Bharath Dharma Jana Sena	795,797	4.0	36	0
Independents (LDF)	487,510	2.4	8	4
Janata Dal (United)	296,585	1.5	7	0
Janata Dal (Secular)	293,274	1.5	5	3
Nationalist Congress Party	237,408	1.2	4	2
Independents (IND)	220,797	1.1	420	1
Revolutionary Socialist Party	216,071	1.1	5	0
Kerala Congress (Democratic)	157,584	0.78	4	0
National Secular Conference	130,843	0.65	2	1
Revolutionary Socialist Party (Leninist)	75,725	0.38	1	1
Kerala Congress (Balakrishna Pillai)	74,429	0.37	1	1
Kerala Congress (Jacob)	73,770	0.37	1	1
Communist Marxist Party (Aravindakshan)	64,666	0.32	1	1
Congress (Secular)	54,347	0.27	1	1
Total	20,232,718	100.00	1,203	140
Valid votes	20,232,718	99.97		
Invalid votes	6,107	0.03		
Votes cast / turnout	20,238,825	77.53		
Abstentions	5,866,244	22.47		
Registered voters	26,105,069			

=== Puducherry ===
The tenure of the Legislative Assembly of Puducherry expired on June 2, 2016. The polls for the next assembly were held on 16 May 2016 to elect members of the 30 constituencies in the non-contiguous territory. INC won 15 out of 30 seats.

Parties and Coalitions	Votes	Vote %	Vote swing	Contested	Won	Change
Indian National Congress	2,44,886	30.6	▲5.54	21	15	▲8
All India N.R. Congress	2,25,082	28.1	▼3.65	30	8	▼7
All India Anna Dravida Munnetra Kazhagam	134,597	16.8	▲3.05	30	4	▼1
Dravida Munnetra Kazhagam	70,836	8.9	▼1.78	9	2	Steady
Bharatiya Janata Party	19,303	2.4	▲1.08	30	0	Steady
Independents	62,884	7.9	–		1	Steady
None of the above	13,240	1.7	–	–	–	–
Total	8,00,343				30	
Valid votes	8,00,343	99.86				
Invalid votes	1,099	0.14				
Votes cast / turnout	8,01,442	85.08				
Abstentions	1,43,490	14.92				
Registered voters	9,41,935					
Source: International Business Times

=== Tamil Nadu ===
The tenure of the Legislative Assembly of Tamil Nadu expired on May 22, 2016. The polls for the next assembly were held on 16 May 2016 for the 234 seats of the Legislative Assembly in the state of Tamil Nadu in India. In the previous election in 2011, the AIADMK, under the leadership of Jayalalithaa, won a majority and formed the government. The results declared on 19 May 2016 and AIADMK was able to retain power with a comfortable majority of 133 seats out of 231.

Summary of the 2016 Tamil Nadu legislative election
Party/Alliance		Votes	%	Seats		
Party/Alliance		Votes	%	Contested	Won	+/-
All India Anna Dravida Munnetra Kazhagam (AIADMK)		17,806,490	40.88%	234	136	▼14
DPA	Dravida Munnetra Kazhagam (DMK)	13,670,511	31.39%	178	89	▲66
DPA	Indian National Congress	2,774,075	6.47%	41	8	▲3
DPA	Indian Union Muslim League	313,808	0.73%	5	1	▲1
DPA	Puthiya Tamilagam	219,830	0.51%	4	0	▼2
DPA	Manithaneya Makkal Katchi	197,150	0.46%	4	0	▼2
DPA	Total	17,175,374	39.40	234	98	▲66
Others		70,40,068	21.26%	234	0	Steady
Independents		617,907	1.44%	234	0	Steady
None of the above		5,65,077	1.31%	234	–	–
Total		4,35,56,184	100.00	-	234	-
Valid votes		4,35,56,184	99.93			
Invalid votes		29,507	0.07			
Votes cast / turnout		4,35,85,691	74.81			
Abstentions		1,46,74,574	25.19			
Registered voters		5,82,60,506				

Election to two assembly constituencies were cancelled by the Election Commission on confirmed reports of bribing voters in Aravakurichi and Thanjavur. Elections were held later there on 26 October 2016

== Legislative Assembly by-elections ==
=== Arunachal Pradesh ===
S.No	Date	Constituency	MLA before election	Party before election	Elected MLA	Party after election
1	19 November 2016	Hayuliang	Kalikho Pul	People's Party of Arunachal	Dasanglu Pul	Bharatiya Janata Party

=== Assam ===
S.No	Date	Constituency	MLA before election	Party before election	Elected MLA	Party after election
1	19 November 2016	Baithalangso	Mansing Rongpi	Indian National Congress	Mansing Rongpi	Bharatiya Janata Party

=== Bihar ===
S.No	Date	Constituency	MLA before election	Party before election	Elected MLA	Party after election
1	13 February 2016	Harlakhi	Basant Kushwaha	Rashtriya Lok Samata Party	Sudhanshu Shekhar	Rashtriya Lok Samata Party

=== Gujarat ===
S.No	Date	Constituency	MLA before election	Party before election	Elected MLA	Party after election
1	21 January 2016	Choryasi	Rajendrabhai Parmar	Bharatiya Janata Party	Zankhana Patel	Bharatiya Janata Party
2	16 May 2016	Talala	Jashubhai Barad	Indian National Congress	Govindbhai Parmar	Bharatiya Janata Party

=== Jammu and Kashmir ===
S.No	Date	Constituency	MLA before election	Party before election	Elected MLA	Party after election
1	22 June 2016	Anantnag	Mufti Mohammed Sayeed	Jammu and Kashmir People's Democratic Party	Mehbooba Mufti	Jammu and Kashmir People's Democratic Party

=== Jharkhand ===
S.No	Date	Constituency	MLA before election	Party before election	Elected MLA	Party after election
1	16 May 2016	Godda	Raghu Nandan Mandal	Bharatiya Janata Party	Amit Kumar Mandal	Bharatiya Janata Party
2	16 May 2016	Panki	Bidesh Singh	Indian National Congress	Devendra Kumar Singh	Indian National Congress

=== Karnataka ===
S.No	Date	Constituency	MLA before election	Party before election	Elected MLA	Party after election
1	13 February 2016	Bidar	Gurupadappa Nagamarapalli	Bharatiya Janata Party	Rahim Khan	Indian National Congress
2	13 February 2016	Devadurga	Venkatesh Nayak	Indian National Congress	K. Shivana Gowda Nayaka	Bharatiya Janata Party
3	13 February 2016	Hebbal	R Jagadeesh Kumar	Indian National Congress	Y.A. Narayana Swamy	Bharatiya Janata Party

=== Madhya Pradesh ===
S.No	Date	Constituency	MLA before election	Party before election	Elected MLA	Party after election
1	13 February 2016	Maihar	Narayan Prasad	Indian National Congress	Narayan Tripathi	Bharatiya Janata Party
2	30 May 2016	Ghoradongri	Sajjan Singh Uikey	Bharatiya Janata Party	Mangal Singh Dhruve	Bharatiya Janata Party
3	19 November 2016	Nepanagar	Rajendra Shyamlal Dadu	Bharatiya Janata Party	Manju Rajendra Dadu	Bharatiya Janata Party

=== Maharashtra ===
S.No	Date	Constituency	MLA before election	Party before election	Elected MLA	Party after election
1	13 February 2016	Palghar	Krushna Arjun Ghoda	Shiv Sena	Amit Krushna Ghoda	Shiv Sena

=== Puducherry ===
S.No	Date	Constituency	MLA before election	Party before election	Elected MLA	Party after election
1	19 November 2016	Nellithope	A. Johnkumar	Indian National Congress	V. Narayanasamy	Indian National Congress

=== Punjab ===
S.No	Date	Constituency	MLA before election	Party before election	Elected MLA	Party after election
1	13 February 2016	Khadoor Sahib	Ramanjit Singh Sikki	Indian National Congress	Ranjit Singh Brahampura	Shiromani Akali Dal

=== Tamil Nadu ===
S.No	Date	Constituency	MLA before election	Party before election	Elected MLA	Party after election
1	19 November 2016	Thiruparankundram	S. M. Seenivel	All India Anna Dravida Munnetra Kazhagam	A. K. Bose	All India Anna Dravida Munnetra Kazhagam

=== Telangana ===
S.No	Date	Constituency	MLA before election	Party before election	Elected MLA	Party after election
1	13 February 2016	Narayankhed	Patlolla Kishta Reddy	Indian National Congress	Mahareddy Bhupal Reddy	Bharat Rashtra Samithi
2	16 May 2016	Palair	Ramireddy Venkatareddy	Indian National Congress	Tummala Nageswara Rao	Bharat Rashtra Samithi

=== Tripura ===
S.No	Date	Constituency	MLA before election	Party before election	Elected MLA	Party after election
1	13 February 2016	Amarpur	Manoranjan Acharjee	Communist Party of India (Marxist)	Parimal Debnath	Communist Party of India (Marxist)
2	19 November 2016	Barjala	Jitendra Sarkar	Communist Party of India (Marxist)	Jhumu Sarkar	Communist Party of India (Marxist)
3	19 November 2016	Khowai	Samsir Debsarkar	Communist Party of India (Marxist)	Biswajit Dutta	Communist Party of India (Marxist)

=== Uttar Pradesh ===
S.No	Date	Constituency	MLA before election	Party before election	Elected MLA	Party after election
1	13 February 2016	Deoband	Rajendra Singh Rana	Samajwadi Party	Mavia Ali	Indian National Congress
2	13 February 2016	Muzaffarnagar	Chitranjan Swaroop	Samajwadi Party	Kapil Dev Aggarwal	Bharatiya Janata Party
3	13 February 2016	Bikapur	Mitrasen Yadav	Samajwadi Party	Anand Sen	Samajwadi Party
4	16 May 2016	Bilari	Mohd. Irfan	Samajwadi Party	Mohd. Faeem	Samajwadi Party
5	16 May 2016	Jangipur	Kailash	Samajwadi Party	Kismatiya	Samajwadi Party

=== West Bengal ===
S.No	Date	Constituency	MLA before election	Party before election	Elected MLA	Party after election
1	19 November 2016	Monteswar	Sajal Panja	All India Trinamool Congress	Saikat Panja	All India Trinamool Congress

== Local Body Elections ==
=== Chandigarh ===
Date	Municipal Bodies	Winner 2016
18 December 2016	Chandigarh Municipal Corporation	Bharatiya Janata Party
