= General House of Municipal Corporation Chandigarh =

General House of Chandigarh Municipal Corporation is the legislature for the Chandigarh Municipal Corporation.

Contesting the 2021 Chandigarh Municipal Corporation election for the first time, Aam Aadmi Party won 14 seats in the council of total 35 elected seats. However, the BJP managed to retain the power in the house, following defections and it later became the single largest party in the house. Sitting mayor Ravi Kant Sharma from BJP lost his seat to AAP candidate Damanpreet Singh.

Composition of Chandigarh Municipal Corporation (October 2025)
Party	Seats
Bharatiya Janata Party	18
Aam Aadmi Party	11
Indian National Congress	6
Nominated	9
Member of Parliament	1

== Current members ==
=== Elected councillors ===
Mayor: Saurabh Joshi
Senior Deputy Mayor: Jasmanpreet Singh Babbar
Deputy Mayor: Suman Sharma
Ward No.	Councillor	Party	Remarks
1	Jaswinder Kaur	AAP	
2	Maheshinder Singh Sidhu	BJP	
3	Dalip Sharma	BJP	
4	Suman Sharma	BJP	Elected as AAP candidate, later defected to BJP
5	Darshana	INC	
6	Sarabjit Kaur	BJP	
7	Manoj Sonkar	BJP	
8	Harjeet Singh	BJP	
9	Bimala Dubey	BJP	
10	Harpreet Kaur Babla	BJP	Elected as INC candidate, later defected to BJP.
11	Anup Gupta	BJP	
12	Saurabh Joshi	BJP	
13	Sachin Galav	INC	
14	Kuljeet Sandhu	BJP	
15	Ram Chander Yadav	AAP	
16	Poonam	BJP	Elected as AAP candidate, defected to BJP after election.
17	Damanpreet Singh	AAP	
18	Taruna Mehta	INC	Elected as AAP candidate, defected to INC after the election.
19	Neha Musawat	BJP	Elected as AAP candidate, defected to BJP after election.
20	Gurcharan Jeet Singh Kala	BJP	Elected as INC candidate, defected to BJP, then to AAP and then again to BJP after the election.
21	Jasbir Singh	AAP	
22	Anju Katyal	AAP	
23	Prem Lata	AAP	
24	Jasbir Singh Bunty	INC	
25	Yogesh Dhingra	AAP	
26	Kuldeep Kumar	AAP	
27	Gurbax Rawat	BJP	Elected as INC candidate, defected to BJP on 27 January 2025.
28	Nirmala Devi	INC	
29	Manaur	AAP	
30	Hardeep Singh	AAP	Elected as SAD candidate, defected to AAP after the election.
31	Lakhbir Singh Billu	BJP	Elected as AAP candidate, defected to BJP after the election.
32	Jasmanpreet Singh Babbar	BJP	
33	Kanwarjit Rana	BJP	
34	Gurpeet Singh	INC	
35	Rajinder Sharma	BJP	

=== Nominated councillors ===
Sr. No.	Councillor
1	Charanjiv Singh
2	Ajay Dutta
3	Sachin Kumar Lohtiya
4	Haji Mohd. Khurshid Ali
5	Dr Joytsna Wig
6	Shipra Bansal
7	Sat Parkash Aggarwal
8	Kamla Sharma
9	Maj. Gen. M. S. Kandal
