= 2001 Chandigarh Municipal Corporation election =

Local body election in India

2001 Chandigarh Municipal corporation election
- December 2001
- All 20 seats of the Chandigarh Municipal Corporation; 11 seats needed for a majority
Party	Leader	Vote %	Seats	+/–
INC			13	
BJP			3	
SAD			1	
Chandigarh Vikas Manch			3	
Independent			0	
This lists parties that won seats. See the complete results below.
Majority before	Majority after
Indian National Congress	Indian National Congress

The elections for the Chandigarh Municipal Corporation were held in December 2001. The candidates were in fray for the election to 20 seats (wards) of Chandigarh union territory.

== Results ==
Congress party won 13 seats out of total 20 and was the single largest party. BJP won 3 seats and its alliance partner Shiromani Akali Dal (SAD) won 1 seat. Chandigarh Vikas Manch won 3 seats.

Chandigarh Municipal Corporation
Party	Seats won	Seats +/−	Vote %
Indian National Congress	13		
Bharatiya Janata Party	3		
Shiromani Akali Dal	1		
Chandigarh Vikas Manch	3		
Independent	0		

== Aftermath ==
The Chandigarh Municipal Corporation council completed its tenure of 5 years. 2006 Chandigarh Municipal Corporation election were the next MC elections.
