= Amarpur Assembly constituency =

Amarpur could be one of the following assembly constituencies in India:

- Amarpur, Bihar Assembly constituency
- Amarpur, Tripura Assembly constituency
