= Ranjit Das =

Ranjit Das may refer to:

- Ranjit Das (footballer) (1932–2026), Bangladeshi football player and coach
- Ranjit Das (politician) (born 1964), Indian politician
