= Bidar South Assembly constituency =

Vidhana Sabha Seat

Coordinates: 17.86°N 77.47°E

Bidar South
- Constituency No. 49 for the Karnataka Legislative Assembly

Constituency details
- Country: India
- Region: South India
- State: Karnataka
- District: Bidar
- Lok Sabha constituency: Bidar
- Established: 2008
- Total electors: 205,201
- Reservation: None

Member of Legislative Assembly
- 16th Karnataka Legislative Assembly
- Incumbent Shailendra Beldale
- Party: Bharatiya Janata Party
- Elected year: 2023
- Preceded by: Bandeppa Kashempur

Bidar South Assembly constituency is one of the seats in Karnataka Legislative Assembly in India. It is a segment of Bidar Lok Sabha constituency and is a part of Bidar district.

Shailendra Beldale is the current MLA from Bidar South.

== Members of the Legislative Assembly ==
Election	Member	Party
2008	Bandeppa Kashempur	Janata Dal
2013	Ashok Kheny	Karnataka Makkala Paksha
2018	Bandeppa Kashempur	Janata Dal
2023	Dr. Shailendra Beldale	Bharatiya Janata Party

== Election results ==
=== Assembly Election 2023 ===
2023 Karnataka Legislative Assembly election : Bidar South
Party	Candidate	Votes	%	±%
BJP	Dr. Shailendra Beldale	49,872	32.51	▲2.01
INC	Ashok Kheny	48,609	31.69	▲6.40
JD(S)	Bandeppa Kashempur	31,374	20.45	▼19.23
Independent	Chandra Singh	14,837	9.67	New
AAP	M. Naseemuddin Patel	5,104	3.33	New
NOTA	None of the above	671	0.44	▼0.25
Margin of victory		1,263	0.82	▼8.35
Turnout		153,464	74.79	▲5.02
Total valid votes		153,384		
Registered electors		205,201		▲3.00
BJP gain from JD(S)		Swing	▼7.17	

=== Assembly Election 2018 ===
2018 Karnataka Legislative Assembly election : Bidar South
Party	Candidate	Votes	%	±%
JD(S)	Bandeppa Kashempur	55,107	39.68	▲11.38
BJP	Dr. Shailendra Beldale	42,365	30.50	▲29.35
INC	Ashok Kheny	35,131	25.29	▲20.77
WPOI	Nazeer Ahmed	968	0.70	New
NOTA	None of the above	957	0.69	New
Margin of victory		12,742	9.17	▼4.81
Turnout		138,989	69.77	▲0.80
Total valid votes		138,887		
Registered electors		199,222		▲10.00
JD(S) gain from Karnataka Makkala Paksha		Swing	▼2.60	

=== Assembly Election 2013 ===
2013 Karnataka Legislative Assembly election : Bidar South
Party	Candidate	Votes	%	±%
KMP	Ashok Kheny	47,763	42.28	New
JD(S)	Bandeppa Kashempur	31,975	28.30	▼4.63
BSP	Abdul Mannan	16,015	14.18	▼8.33
KJP	Dr. Shayalendra Kashinath Beldale	11,560	10.23	New
INC	Meenakshi Sangram	5,105	4.52	▲1.91
Independent	Amruthrao Chimkode	1,883	1.67	New
BJP	Dr. Baswaraj Patil	1,301	1.15	▼30.48
LSP	Dr. Abdul Kareem	1,156	1.02	New
National Development Party	Zameeruddin	1,002	0.89	▼0.01
Margin of victory		15,788	13.98	▲12.67
Turnout		124,908	68.97	▲10.43
Total valid votes		112,971		
Registered electors		181,115		▲8.85
Karnataka Makkala Paksha gain from JD(S)		Swing	▲9.35	

=== Assembly Election 2008 ===
2008 Karnataka Legislative Assembly election : Bidar South
Party	Candidate	Votes	%	±%
JD(S)	Bandeppa Kashempur	32,054	32.93	New
BJP	Sanjay Kheny	30,783	31.63	New
BSP	M. Nasimoddin N. Patel	21,907	22.51	New
Independent	Shivaraj Chandrashetty	2,877	2.96	New
INC	Abdul Samad Siddiqui Advocate	2,544	2.61	New
Independent	Somshekar Bhimrao	1,564	1.61	New
Independent	Sharanayya Mathapathi	1,512	1.55	New
Independent	Shanker Sir	1,029	1.06	New
National Development Party	Advocate Moulvi Zamiroddin	875	0.90	New
Margin of victory		1,271	1.31	
Turnout		97,408	58.54	
Total valid votes		97,331		
Registered electors		166,391		
JD(S) win (new seat)				

== See also ==
- List of constituencies of Karnataka Legislative Assembly
