= Bandeppa Kashempur =

Indian politician

Bandeppa Khashempur
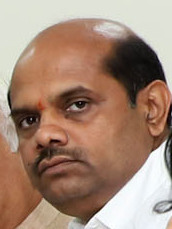
- Bandeppa Khashempur in 2018

Minister of Co-Operation of Karnataka
- In office 8 June 2018 – 23 July 2019
- Chief Minister: H. D. Kumaraswamy
- Preceded by: H. S. Mahadeva Prasad
- Succeeded by: Basavaraj Bommai
- Constituency: Bidar South

Minister of Agriculture of Karnataka
- In office 3 February 2006 – 9 October 2007
- Preceded by: V.S.Koujalgi
- Succeeded by: S. A. Ravindranath
- Constituency: Bidar South

Member of the Karnataka Legislative Assembly
- In office 12 May 2018 – 13 May 2023
- Preceded by: Ashok Kheny
- Succeeded by: Dr. Shailendra Beldale
- Constituency: Bidar South

Member of the Karnataka Legislative Assembly
- In office 2008–2013
- Preceded by: Position Established
- Succeeded by: Ashok Kheny
- Constituency: Bidar South

Member of the Karnataka Legislative Assembly
- In office 2004–2008
- Preceded by: Rameshkumar Pande
- Succeeded by: Gurupadappa Nagamarapalli
- Constituency: Bidar South

Personal details
- Born: 15 June 1964 (age 62) Khashempur
- Party: Janata Dal (Secular) (from 2006)
- Other political affiliations: Independent (2004-2006); Indian National Congress (till 2004)
- Spouse: Nalini Khashempur
- Children: Sharath Khashempur Kewal Khashempur
- Profession: Politician, Agriculturist

Bandeppa Manikappa Kashempur (born 15 June 1964) is an Indian politician who served as the Co-operation minister in the Second Kumaraswamy ministry (8 June 2018 – 23 July 2019). He was served as the Member of the Karnataka Legislative Assembly from the Bidar South constituency from 2004–2008, 2008–2013, 2018–2023. He also served as Minister for Agriculture from 3 February 2006 to 9 October 2007 in First Kumaraswamy ministry (JDS-BJP Coalition government headed by H. D. Kumaraswamy). He is a member of Janata Dal (Secular) Party and hails from Kuruba community.

== Positions held ==
- Agriculture Minister of Karnataka (3 February 2006 – 9 October 2007)
- Member of the Legislative Assembly for Bidar (2004–2007)
- Member of the Legislative Assembly for Bidar South (2008–2013, 2018–2023)
- Co-operation Minister of Karnataka (8 June 2018 – 23 July 2019)
