= 2026 Chandigarh Municipal Corporation election =

Upcoming Local Body election in Chandigarh

- 23 December 2026

All 35 wards for Chandigarh Municipal Corporation 18 seats needed for a majority
- Turnout: TBD

	First party	Second party	Third party
Leader	Jatinder Pal Singh Malhotra	Vijay Pal Singh	Harmohinder Singh Lucky
Party	BJP	AAP	INC
Alliance	NDA	None	INDIA
Last election	12 seats; 29.30% vote	14 seats; 27.08% vote	8 seats; 29.79% vote
Seats before	18	11	6
Mayor before election
Saurabh Joshi
BJP
Elected mayor
TBD

The 2026 Chandigarh Municipal Corporation election will be held on 23 December 2026 tentatively to elect 35 members of the Chandigarh Municipal Corporation (CMC) which governs the city of Chandigarh.

== Schedule ==
Poll event	Schedule
Last Date for filing nomination	3 December 2026
Scrutiny of nomination papers	4 December 2026
Last Date for withdrawal of nomination	7 December 2026
Date of poll	23 December 2026
Date of counting of votes	26 December 2026

== Parties and alliances ==
Party	Flag	Symbol	Leader	Seats contested
Bharatiya Janata Party			Jatinder Pal Singh Malhotra (Note: State President of BJP Chandigarh)	TBD
Aam Aadmi Party			Vijay Pal Singh (Note: State President of AAP Chandigarh)	9 (declared)
Indian National Congress			Harmohinder Singh Lucky (Note: State President of INC Chandigarh)	TBD
Shiromani Akali Dal			Charanjit Singh Villy (Note: State President of SAD Chandigarh)	TBD

== Candidates ==
List of candidates
Ward Details							
Ward Details		BJP		AAP		INC	
No.	Reservation	Party	Candidate	Party	Candidate	Party	Candidate
1	SC	BJP		AAP	Dildar Singh	INC	
2	UR-W	BJP		AAP		INC	
3	SC-W	BJP		AAP		INC	
4	SC	BJP		AAP		INC	
5	None	BJP		AAP		INC	
6	None	BJP		AAP		INC	
7	None	BJP		AAP		INC	
8	UR-W	BJP		AAP		INC	
9	SC	BJP		AAP		INC	
10	None	BJP		AAP		INC	
11	UR-W	BJP		AAP		INC	
12	None	BJP		AAP		INC	
13	UR-W	BJP		AAP		INC	
14	None	BJP		AAP		INC	
15	SC	BJP		AAP		INC	
16	None	BJP		AAP		INC	
17	UR-W	BJP		AAP		INC	
18	None	BJP		AAP		INC	
19	None	BJP		AAP		INC	
20	None	BJP		AAP		INC	
21	UR-W	BJP		AAP	Gurpreet Kaur Laddi	INC	
22	None	BJP		AAP	Anju Katyal	INC	
23	None	BJP		AAP	Omkar Singh Aulakh	INC	
24	None	BJP		AAP	Kuldeep Kumar	INC	
25	UR-W	BJP		AAP	Radhika Dhingra	INC	
26	UR-W	BJP		AAP		INC	
27	None	BJP		AAP	Ajit Singh Jind	INC	
28	None	BJP		AAP		INC	
29	SC-W	BJP		AAP		INC	
30	None	BJP		AAP	Satnam Kaur	INC	
31	None	BJP		AAP		INC	
32	SC-W	BJP		AAP	Arun Prabha Khurcha	INC	
33	None	BJP		AAP		INC	
34	None	BJP		AAP		INC	
35	None	BJP		AAP		INC	

== Turnout ==
Voter Demographics and Turnout
Gender	No. of Voters	No. of Voters who cast votes	Voters Turnout (%)
Male	2,34,516		
Female	2,25,671		
Third Gender	22		
Total		4,60,209	

== Result ==
=== Results by party ===
0	0	0
BJP	AAP	INC

Vote share by Party
1. BJP (0.00%)
2. AAP (0.00%)
3. INC (0.00%)
4. SAD (0.00%)
5. Others (0.00%)
6. IND (0.00%)
7. NOTA (0.00%)

Party	Popular vote			Seats		
Party	Votes	%	±pp	Contested	Won	+/-
Bharatiya Janata Party						
Aam Aadmi Party						
Indian National Congress						
Shiromani Akali Dal						
Independents						
None of the Above						
Total			—			—

=== Results by ward ===
Results
Ward Details		Winner			Runner Up			Margin
No.	Reservation	Party	Candidate	Votes	Party	Candidate	Votes	Margin
1	SC							
2	UR-W							
3	SC-W							
4	SC							
5	None							
6	None							
7	None							
8	UR-W							
9	SC							
10	None							
11	UR-W							
12	None							
13	UR-W							
14	None							
15	SC							
16	None							
17	UR-W							
18	None							
19	None							
20	None							
21	UR-W							
22	None							
23	None							
24	None							
25	UR-W							
26	UR-W							
27	None							
28	None							
29	SC-W							
30	None							
31	None							
32	SC-W							
33	None							
34	None							
35	None							

== See also ==
- Chandigarh Municipal Corporation
- 2021 Chandigarh Municipal Corporation election
- 2024 Indian general election in Chandigarh
- 2026 elections in India
