= 2006 Chandigarh Municipal Corporation election =

Local body election in India

2006 Chandigarh Municipal corporation election
- December 2006
- All 21 seats of the Chandigarh Municipal Corporation; 11 seats needed for a majority
Party	Leader	Vote %	Seats	+/–
INC			12	−1
BJP			6	+3
SAD			2	+1
BSP			1	+1
Independent			0	0
This lists parties that won seats. See the complete results below.
Majority before	Majority after
Indian National Congress	Indian National Congress

The elections for the Chandigarh Municipal Corporation were held in December 2006. The candidates were in fray for the election to 21 seats (wards) of Chandigarh union territory.

Congress had won 12 seats out of total 21. Congress was the largest party followed by BJP with 6 seats, SAD with 2 seats, BSP with 1 and 0 independent.

== Background ==
2001 Chandigarh Municipal Corporation election was the previous election in which Congress party won 13 seats out of total 20 and was the single largest party. BJP won 3 seats and its alliance partner Shiromani Akali Dal (SAD) won 1 seat. Chandigarh Vikas Manch won 3 seats.

== Results ==
Congress party won 12 seats out of total 21 and was the single largest party. BJP won 6 seats and its alliance partner Shiromani Akali Dal (SAD) won 2 seats. BSP won 3 seats.

Chandigarh Municipal Corporation
Party	Seats won	Seats +/−	Vote %
Indian National Congress	12	▼1	
Bharatiya Janata Party	6	▲3	
Shiromani Akali Dal	2	▲1	
Bahujan Samaj Party	1	▲1	
Independent	0		

== Aftermath ==
The Chandigarh Municipal Corporation council completed its tenure of 5 years. After the council's term had expired, 2011 Chandigarh Municipal Corporation election were held.
