= 2011 Chandigarh Municipal Corporation election =

Local body election in India

2011 Chandigarh Municipal corporation election
- December 2011
- All 25 seats of the Chandigarh Municipal Corporation; 13 seats needed for a majority
| Party | Leader | Vote % | Seats | +/– |
|---|---|---|---|---|
| INC | | | 11 | −1 |
| BJP | | | 10 | +4 |
| SAD | | | 2 | 0 |
| BSP | | | 1 | 0 |
| Independent | | | 1 | +1 |
This lists parties that won seats. See the complete results below.
| Majority before | Majority after |
|---|---|
| Indian National Congress | Indian National Congress |

The elections for the Chandigarh Municipal Corporation were held in December 2011. The candidates were in fray for the election to 25 seats (wards) of Chandigarh union territory.

Congress had won 11 seats out of total 25 and lost its majority. Congress was the largest party followed by BJP with 10 seats, SAD with 2 seats, BSP with 1 and 1 independent.

== Background ==
2006 Chandigarh Municipal Corporation election was the previous election in which Congress had won 12 seats out of total 21. Congress was the largest party followed by the BJP with 6 seats, SAD with 2 seats, BSP with 1 and 0 independent.

== Results ==
Congress had won 11 seats out of total 25. Congress was the largest party followed by BJP with 10 seats, SAD with 2 seats, BSP with 1 and 1 independent.

Chandigarh Municipal Corporation
| Party | Seats won | Seats +/− | Vote % |
|---|---|---|---|
| Indian National Congress | 11 | ▼1 | |
| Bharatiya Janata Party | 10 | ▲4 | |
| Shiromani Akali Dal | 2 | Steady | |
| Bahujan Samaj Party | 1 | Steady | |
| Independent | 1 | ▲1 | |

== Aftermath ==
The Chandigarh Municipal Corporation council completed its tenure of 5 years. After the council's term had expired, 2016 Chandigarh Municipal Corporation election were held.
