= Aurad Assembly constituency =

Constituency of the Karnataka legislative assembly in India

Coordinates: 18.25°N 77.42°E

Aurad
- Constituency No. 52 for the Karnataka Legislative Assembly
- Aurad assembly constituency (in red)

Constituency details
- Country: India
- Region: South India
- State: Karnataka
- Division: Kalaburagi
- District: Bidar
- Lok Sabha constituency: Bidar
- Established: 1951 (75 years ago)
- Total electors: 219,444
- Reservation: SC

Member of Legislative Assembly
- 16th Karnataka Legislative Assembly
- Incumbent Prabhu Chauhan
- Party: Bharatiya Janata Party
- Alliance: National Democratic Alliance
- Elected year: 2023
- Preceded by: Gurupadappa Nagamarapalli

Aurad Assembly constituency is one of the 224 legislative constituencies of Karnataka Legislative Assembly in Bidar district in the Indian state of Karnataka. It is part of Bidar Lok Sabha constituency. Since 2008, the seat has been reserved for Scheduled Castes candidates.

== Members of the Legislative Assembly ==
| Election | Member | Party |
|---|---|---|
| 1967 | M. R. S. Rao | Indian National Congress |
| 1972 | Bapurao Vithalrao Patil | Independent politician |
| 1978 | Manik Rao Patil | Indian National Congress |
| 1983 | Manik Rao Patil | Indian National Congress |
| 1985 | Gurupadappa Nagamarapalli | Janata Party |
| 1989 | Gurupadappa Nagamarapalli | Janata Dal |
| 1994 | Gurupadappa Nagamarapalli | Janata Dal |
| 1999 | Gundappa Vakil | Bharatiya Janata Party |
| 2004 | Gurupadappa Nagamarapalli | Indian National Congress |
| 2008 | Prabhu Chauhan | Bharatiya Janata Party |
| 2013 | Prabhu Chauhan | Bharatiya Janata Party |
| 2018 | Prabhu Chauhan | Bharatiya Janata Party |
| 2023 | Prabhu Chauhan | Bharatiya Janata Party |

== Election results ==
=== Assembly Election 2023 ===
2023 Karnataka Legislative Assembly election : Aurad
| Party | Candidate | Votes | % | ±% |
|---|---|---|---|---|
| BJP | Prabhu Chauhan | 81,382 | 51.31 | ▲0.39 |
| INC | Bhimsain Rao Shinde | 71,813 | 45.28 | ▲1.55 |
| JD(S) | Jaisinga S/o Dhanashing | 1,506 | 0.95 | ▼0.82 |
| NOTA | None of the above | 464 | 0.29 | ▼0.36 |
| Margin of victory | | 9,569 | 6.03 | ▼1.16 |
| Turnout | | 158,759 | 72.35 | ▲3.58 |
| Total valid votes | | 158,603 | | |
| Registered electors | | 219,444 | | ▲2.32 |
| BJP hold | | Swing | ▲0.39 | |

=== Assembly Election 2018 ===
2018 Karnataka Legislative Assembly election : Aurad
| Party | Candidate | Votes | % | ±% |
|---|---|---|---|---|
| BJP | Prabhu Chauhan | 75,061 | 50.92 | ▲5.03 |
| INC | Vijaykumar | 64,469 | 43.73 | ▲32.26 |
| JD(S) | Dhanaji | 2,605 | 1.77 | ▼1.86 |
| Bhartiya Bahujan Kranti Dal | Anand | 1,233 | 0.84 | New |
| AIMEP | Pramodkumar | 950 | 0.64 | New |
| NOTA | None of the above | 964 | 0.65 | New |
| Margin of victory | | 10,592 | 7.19 | ▼10.02 |
| Turnout | | 147,479 | 68.77 | ▲0.32 |
| Total valid votes | | 147,409 | | |
| Registered electors | | 214,461 | | ▲13.41 |
| BJP hold | | Swing | ▲5.03 | |

=== Assembly Election 2013 ===
2013 Karnataka Legislative Assembly election : Aurad
| Party | Candidate | Votes | % | ±% |
|---|---|---|---|---|
| BJP | Prabhu Chauhan | 61,826 | 45.89 | ▼9.72 |
| KJP | Dhanaji Bheema Jadhav | 38,635 | 28.67 | New |
| INC | Gaikawad Vijaykumar | 15,456 | 11.47 | ▼17.02 |
| JD(S) | G. M. Yatnoor | 4,892 | 3.63 | ▲0.82 |
| NCP | Roopchand Rathod | 1,225 | 0.91 | New |
| BSP | Devidas | 1,151 | 0.85 | ▼7.32 |
| Independent | Sulochana | 1,098 | 0.81 | |
| Karnataka Makkala Paksha | Raju Kadyal | 1,065 | 0.79 | New |
| Independent | Kasturbai | 904 | 0.67 | |
| Margin of victory | | 23,191 | 17.21 | ▼9.91 |
| Turnout | | 129,446 | 68.45 | ▲10.18 |
| Total valid votes | | 134,739 | | |
| Registered electors | | 189,108 | | ▲7.28 |
| BJP hold | | Swing | ▼9.72 | |

=== Assembly Election 2008 ===
2008 Karnataka Legislative Assembly election : Aurad
| Party | Candidate | Votes | % | ±% |
|---|---|---|---|---|
| BJP | Prabhu Chauhan | 56,964 | 55.61 | ▲34.13 |
| INC | Narsingrao Suryawanshi | 29,186 | 28.49 | ▼13.11 |
| BSP | Vaijanathrao Suryawanshi | 8,374 | 8.17 | New |
| JD(S) | Baburao Kadam | 2,876 | 2.81 | ▼28.46 |
| Independent | Shamanna Bavagi | 2,108 | 2.06 | |
| Independent | Dr. Shankarrao Sonalwadi | 1,412 | 1.38 | |
| SP | Dr. Mohanrao | 821 | 0.80 | New |
| Independent | Vishwanath Mahadu Sindhe | 701 | 0.68 | |
| Margin of victory | | 27,778 | 27.12 | ▲16.80 |
| Turnout | | 102,711 | 58.27 | ▼3.07 |
| Total valid votes | | 102,442 | | |
| Registered electors | | 176,277 | | ▼1.41 |
| BJP gain from INC | | Swing | ▲14.01 | |

=== Assembly Election 2004 ===
2004 Karnataka Legislative Assembly election : Aurad
| Party | Candidate | Votes | % | ±% |
|---|---|---|---|---|
| INC | Gurupadappa Nagamarapalli | 45,621 | 41.60 | ▲11.53 |
| JD(S) | Gundappa Vakil | 34,300 | 31.27 | ▲26.75 |
| BJP | Basawaraj Patil Koller | 23,562 | 21.48 | ▼11.47 |
| JP | Bab Shetty | 2,710 | 2.47 | New |
| Independent | Dr. Shankarrao Sonalwadi | 1,113 | 1.01 | |
| Independent | Machindar Hunaje | 1,057 | 0.96 | |
| Independent | Panchal Tukaram Vittal Rao | 691 | 0.63 | |
| Margin of victory | | 11,321 | 10.32 | ▲7.45 |
| Turnout | | 109,673 | 61.34 | ▼2.62 |
| Total valid votes | | 109,673 | | |
| Registered electors | | 178,807 | | ▲10.90 |
| INC gain from BJP | | Swing | ▲8.65 | |

=== Assembly Election 1999 ===
1999 Karnataka Legislative Assembly election : Aurad
| Party | Candidate | Votes | % | ±% |
|---|---|---|---|---|
| BJP | Gundappa Vakil | 31,967 | 32.95 | ▲25.79 |
| INC | Gurupadappa Nagamarapalli | 29,182 | 30.07 | ▲0.58 |
| Independent | Chandershekar Patil | 15,230 | 15.70 | |
| NCP | Arun Bapusaheb Patil | 13,389 | 13.80 | New |
| JD(S) | Raghunath Rao Jadhav | 4,388 | 4.52 | New |
| BSP | Dr. Bajirao Yadavrao Patil | 1,789 | 1.84 | ▼2.21 |
| Margin of victory | | 2,785 | 2.87 | ▲2.17 |
| Turnout | | 103,132 | 63.96 | ▼0.01 |
| Total valid votes | | 97,031 | | |
| Registered electors | | 161,232 | | ▲3.39 |
| BJP gain from JD | | Swing | ▲2.76 | |

=== Assembly Election 1994 ===
1994 Karnataka Legislative Assembly election : Aurad
| Party | Candidate | Votes | % | ±% |
|---|---|---|---|---|
| JD | Gurupadappa Nagamarapalli | 29,479 | 30.19 | ▼13.56 |
| INC | Shekhar Patil | 28,800 | 29.49 | ▲5.95 |
| Independent | Arun Bapusaheb Patil Ekambekar | 25,141 | 25.74 | |
| BJP | Candarpal Yeshwanthrao Patil | 6,997 | 7.16 | New |
| BSP | Shravan Kumar Sangappa Bhande | 3,959 | 4.05 | New |
| INC | Amruthrao Neelkathrao Watge | 2,279 | 2.33 | New |
| Independent | Maruth Reddy Vithal Reddy | 795 | 0.81 | |
| Margin of victory | | 679 | 0.70 | ▼17.18 |
| Turnout | | 99,752 | 63.97 | ▲1.02 |
| Total valid votes | | 97,658 | | |
| Registered electors | | 155,938 | | ▲13.20 |
| JD hold | | Swing | ▼13.56 | |

=== Assembly Election 1989 ===
1989 Karnataka Legislative Assembly election : Aurad
| Party | Candidate | Votes | % | ±% |
|---|---|---|---|---|
| JD | Gurupadappa Nagamarapalli | 35,508 | 43.75 | New |
| Independent | Bapurao Vithalrao Patil | 20,994 | 25.87 | |
| INC | Ganapath Rao Khuba | 19,106 | 23.54 | ▲7.37 |
| JP | Rasjshekhar Nagamurthy | 3,438 | 4.24 | New |
| Independent | Neelkhant Gurubasappa | 1,234 | 1.52 | |
| Margin of victory | | 14,514 | 17.88 | ▲11.83 |
| Turnout | | 86,712 | 62.95 | ▼4.02 |
| Total valid votes | | 81,166 | | |
| Registered electors | | 137,751 | | ▲22.90 |
| JD gain from JP | | Swing | ▲1.84 | |

=== Assembly Election 1985 ===
1985 Karnataka Legislative Assembly election : Aurad
| Party | Candidate | Votes | % | ±% |
|---|---|---|---|---|
| JP | Gurupadappa Nagamarapalli | 30,972 | 41.91 | ▲24.81 |
| Independent | Bapurao Vithalrao Patil | 26,504 | 35.86 | |
| INC | Manmath Nagshetty Bichkunde | 11,950 | 16.17 | ▼26.77 |
| LKD | Khaja Khamrulla | 1,966 | 2.66 | New |
| Independent | Baburao Kishanrao Patil | 1,203 | 1.63 | |
| IC(S) | Roopchand Rathod | 915 | 1.24 | New |
| Margin of victory | | 4,468 | 6.05 | ▼3.99 |
| Turnout | | 75,065 | 66.97 | ▼2.41 |
| Total valid votes | | 73,900 | | |
| Registered electors | | 112,080 | | ▲16.22 |
| JP gain from INC | | Swing | ▼1.03 | |

=== Assembly Election 1983 ===
1983 Karnataka Legislative Assembly election : Aurad
| Party | Candidate | Votes | % | ±% |
|---|---|---|---|---|
| INC | Manik Rao Patil | 28,218 | 42.94 | ▲38.99 |
| Independent | Bapurao Vithalrao Patil | 21,620 | 32.90 | |
| JP | Kashinath Rao Belure | 11,236 | 17.10 | ▲7.15 |
| Independent | Gulam | 2,683 | 4.08 | |
| Independent | Pandarinath Reddy | 1,464 | 2.23 | |
| Margin of victory | | 6,598 | 10.04 | ▼16.42 |
| Turnout | | 66,905 | 69.38 | ▼3.68 |
| Total valid votes | | 65,720 | | |
| Registered electors | | 96,436 | | ▲4.75 |
| INC gain from INC(I) | | Swing | ▼12.28 | |

=== Assembly Election 1978 ===
1978 Karnataka Legislative Assembly election : Aurad
| Party | Candidate | Votes | % | ±% |
|---|---|---|---|---|
| INC(I) | Manik Rao Patil | 36,381 | 55.22 | New |
| Independent | Bapurao Vithalrao Patil | 18,946 | 28.76 | |
| JP | Balwant Rao Dev Rao Khanapurker | 6,558 | 9.95 | New |
| INC | Manosh Andrish | 2,602 | 3.95 | ▼20.65 |
| Independent | Manik Rao Rachappa | 1,397 | 2.12 | |
| Margin of victory | | 17,435 | 26.46 | ▲19.36 |
| Turnout | | 67,260 | 73.06 | ▲7.04 |
| Total valid votes | | 65,884 | | |
| Rejected ballots | | 1,376 | 2.05 | ▲2.05 |
| Registered electors | | 92,066 | | ▲8.68 |
| INC(I) gain from Independent | | Swing | ▲13.97 | |

=== Assembly Election 1972 ===
1972 Mysore State Legislative Assembly election : Aurad
| Party | Candidate | Votes | % | ±% |
|---|---|---|---|---|
| Independent | Bapurao Vithalrao Patil | 22,431 | 41.25 | |
| INC(O) | Manik Rao Patil | 18,570 | 34.15 | New |
| INC | Ganapath Rao Khuba | 13,376 | 24.60 | ▼32.76 |
| Margin of victory | | 3,861 | 7.10 | ▼7.63 |
| Turnout | | 55,925 | 66.02 | ▼4.35 |
| Total valid votes | | 54,377 | | |
| Registered electors | | 84,712 | | ▲25.05 |
| Independent gain from INC | | Swing | ▼16.11 | |

=== Assembly Election 1967 ===
1967 Mysore State Legislative Assembly election : Aurad
| Party | Candidate | Votes | % | ±% |
|---|---|---|---|---|
| INC | M. R. S. Rao | 25,965 | 57.36 | New |
| Independent | P. G. R. Patil | 19,299 | 42.64 | |
| Margin of victory | | 6,666 | 14.73 | |
| Turnout | | 47,673 | 70.37 | |
| Total valid votes | | 45,264 | | |
| Registered electors | | 67,742 | | |
| INC gain from | | | | |

== See also ==
- Aurad
- Bidar district
- List of constituencies of Karnataka Legislative Assembly
