= Prabhu Chauhan =

Indian politician

Minister of Animal Husbandry Government of Karnataka
- In office 20 August 2019 – 13 May 2023
- Chief Minister: B. S. Yediyurappa; Basavaraj Bommai
- Preceded by: Venkatarao Nadagouda
- Succeeded by: K. Venkatesh

Minister of Haj & Wakf Government of Karnataka
- In office 27 September 2019 – 21 January 2021
- Chief Minister: B. S. Yediyurappa
- Succeeded by: Anand Singh

Minister of Minority Welfare Government of Karnataka
- In office 27 September 2019 – 10 February 2020
- Chief Minister: B. S. Yediyurappa
- Preceded by: B. Z. Zameer Ahmed Khan
- Succeeded by: Shrimant Patil

Member of the Karnataka Legislative Assembly
- Incumbent
- Assumed office 25 May 2008
- Preceded by: Gurupadappa Nagamarapalli
- Constituency: Aurad Assembly constituency

Minister in Charge of the Bidar and Yadagiri district
- In office 17 September 2019 – 28 July 2021

Minister incharge of the Yadagiri district
- In office 25 January 2022 – 13 May 2023

Personal details
- Born: Prabhu Bamala Chauhan; 6 July 1969 (age 56) Ghamsubai Thanda, Aurad taluka
- Party: Bharatiya Janata Party
- Spouse: Swati Prabhu Chauhan
- Children: Prateek Prabhu Chauhan (son); Priyanka Prabhu Chauhan (Daughter)
- Parent: Bhamala (father)
- Relatives: Amit Annarao Rathod (Son in Law)
- Education: Bachelor of Arts
- Occupation: Politician
- Profession: Agriculturist

Prabhu Bamala Chauhan (born 6 July 1969) is an Indian politician who has been the member of the Legislative Assembly from Aurad assembly constituency since from 2008. He was the Minister of State for Animal Husbandry Department of Karnataka from 20 August 2019 to 13 May 2023 in B.S.Yediyurappa cabinet and Later he has also sworn in as cabinet minister on 4 August 2020 for a second time in Basavaraj Bommai cabinet and the Animal Husbandry portfolio has been allotted. and he was the Minister in charge of the Bidar district. In Basavaraj Bommai Cabinet he was made Minister in charge of the Yadgiri district.

== Political career ==
He has been elected to Karnataka assembly from Aurad, a reserved constituency in 2008 by defeating incumbent MP of Bidar Mr. Narsingrao Suryawanshi. He won subsequent elections in 2013, 2018 and 2023 from same Constituency (Aurad). Gopinath Munde, former Deputy Chief minister of Maharashtra, was his mentor. Chauhan is the protégé of ex-MLA from Aurad, Gundappa Vakil.
