= Shailendra Beldale =

Indian politician (born 1973)

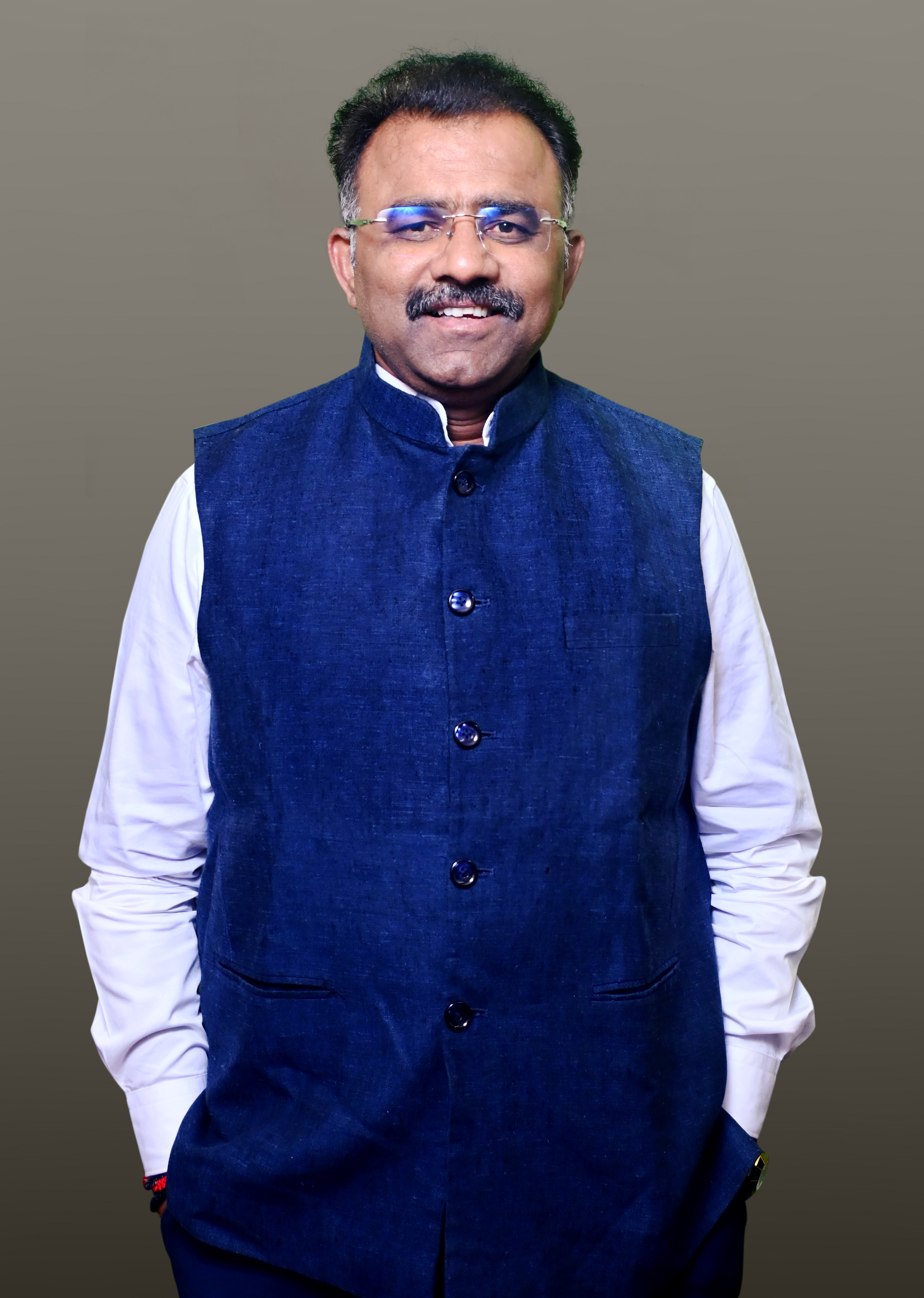

Personal details
- Born: 30 September 1974 (age 51)

Shailendra Beldale (born 1973) is an Indian politician from Karnataka. He is a member of the Karnataka Legislative Assembly from Bidar South Assembly constituency in Bidar district. He won the 2023 Karnataka Legislative Assembly election representing Bharatiya Janata Party.

== Early life and education ==
Beldale is from Bidar taluk, Bidar district, Karnataka. His father's name is Kashinath Beldale. He completed his Bachelor of Homeopathy Medical Science in 1996 at HKE Society's Homeopathy Medical College, which is affiliated with Gulbarga University, Gulbarga.

== Career ==
Beldale won from Bidar South Assembly constituency representing Bharatiya Janata Party in the 2023 Karnataka Legislative Assembly election. He polled 49,872 votes and defeated his nearest rival, Ashok Kheny of Indian National Congress, by a margin of 1,263 votes.

In March 2025, Beldale along with Manjula Limbavali, received relief from the High Court which struck down the proceedings against them in a private complaint, on charges of allegedly concealing their property details in the affidavit filed to the Election Commission of India before the last elections. The court further said that only the election commission has the right to file complaint on such matters. He previously served as Chairman of KSIIDC, where he worked on industrial and infrastructure development initiatives in Karnataka.
