= Bidar Assembly constituency =

Vidhan Sabha constituency in Karnataka

Coordinates: 17.91°N 77.50°E

Bidar
- Constituency No. 50 for the Karnataka Legislative Assembly

Constituency details
- Country: India
- Region: South India
- State: Karnataka
- District: Bidar
- Lok Sabha constituency: Bidar
- Established: 1951
- Total electors: 228,035
- Reservation: None

Member of Legislative Assembly
- 16th Karnataka Legislative Assembly
- Incumbent Rahim Khan
- Party: Indian National Congress
- Elected year: 2018
- Preceded by: Gurupadappa Nagamarapalli

Bidar Assembly constituency is one of the seats in Karnataka Legislative Assembly in India. It is a segment of Bidar Lok Sabha constituency.

== Members of the Legislative Assembly ==
Election	Member	Party
1952	Shafiuddin	Indian National Congress
1957	Maqsood Ali Khan	Indian National Congress
1962	Maqsood Ali Khan	Indian National Congress
1967	C. Gurupadappa	Bharatiya Jana Sangh
1972	Manikrao. R. Phuleker	Indian National Congress
1978	Veershetty Moglappa Kusnoor	Indian National Congress
1982 By-election (Note: Resigned on 08/04/1982)	M. Kamal	Indian National Congress
1983	Narayan Rao Manhalli	Bharatiya Janata Party
1985	Mohd Laiquddin Mohd. Burhanuddin	Indian National Congress
1989	Narayan Rao Manhalli	Bharatiya Janata Party
1994	Syed Zulfekar Hashmi	Bahujan Samaj Party
1999	Ramesh Kumar Pande	Bharatiya Janata Party
2004	Bandeppa Kashempur	Independent politician
2008	Dr. Gurupadappa Nagamarapalli	Indian National Congress
2009 By-election (Note: Resigned on 04/02/2009)	Rahim Khan	Indian National Congress
2013	Dr. Gurupadappa Nagamarapalli	Karnataka Janata Paksha
2016 By-election (Note: Died on 17/11/2015)	Rahim Khan	Indian National Congress
2018	Rahim Khan	Indian National Congress
2023	Rahim Khan	Indian National Congress

== Election results ==
=== Assembly Election 2023 ===
2023 Karnataka Legislative Assembly election : Bidar
Party	Candidate	Votes	%	±%
INC	Rahim Khan	69,165	46.03%	▼6.07
JD(S)	Suryakanth Nagamarpalli	58,385	38.85%	New
BJP	Ishwar Singh Thakur	17,779	11.83%	▼32.99
AAP	Gulam Ali	2,032	1.35%	New
NOTA	None of the above	543	0.36%	▼0.13
Margin of victory		10,780	7.17%	▼0.12
Turnout		150,421	65.96%	▲0.97
Total valid votes		150,277		
Registered electors		228,035		▲5.16
INC hold		Swing	▼6.07	

=== Assembly Election 2018 ===
2018 Karnataka Legislative Assembly election : Bidar
Party	Candidate	Votes	%	±%
INC	Rahim Khan	73,270	52.10%	▼3.95
BJP	Suryakanth Nagamarpalli	63,025	44.82%	▲6.93
BSP	M. Muniyappa	1,384	0.98%	▼0.23
NOTA	None of the above	690	0.49%	▲0.04
Margin of victory		10,245	7.29%	▼10.87
Turnout		140,934	64.99%	▲3.77
Total valid votes		140,623		
Registered electors		216,853		▲5.58
INC hold		Swing	▼3.95	

=== Assembly By-election 2016 ===
2016 Karnataka Legislative Assembly by-election : Bidar
Party	Candidate	Votes	%	±%
INC	Rahim Khan	70,138	56.05%	▲23.32
BJP	Prakash Khanore	47,417	37.89%	▲33.89
JD(S)	Md. Ayaz Khan	4,421	3.53%	▲1.88
BSP	Dr. Madna Vaijinath	1,519	1.21%	New
NOTA	None of the above	565	0.45%	New
Margin of victory		22,721	18.16%	▲16.41
Turnout		125,751	61.22%	▲1.75
Total valid votes		125,134		
Registered electors		205,392		▲7.95
INC gain from KJP		Swing	▲21.57	

=== Assembly Election 2013 ===
2013 Karnataka Legislative Assembly election : Bidar
Party	Candidate	Votes	%	±%
KJP	Dr. Gurupadappa Nagamarapalli	50,718	34.48%	New
INC	Rahim Khan	48,147	32.73%	▼7.29
BJP	Ramesh Kumar Pande	5,888	4.00%	▼25.09
JD(S)	Dr. Amar Avinash Yerolkar	2,420	1.65%	▼19.86
Pyramid Party of India	Pandari	1,485	1.01%	New
Margin of victory		2,571	1.75%	▼9.18
Turnout		113,144	59.47%	▲6.18
Total valid votes		147,091		
Registered electors		190,262		▲2.26
KJP gain from INC		Swing	▼5.54	

=== Assembly By-election 2009 ===
2009 Karnataka Legislative Assembly by-election : Bidar
Party	Candidate	Votes	%	±%
INC	Rahim Khan	39,595	40.02%	▲2.19
BJP	Suryakanth Nagamarpalli	28,781	29.09%	▲5.91
JD(S)	Maruti Khashpur	21,276	21.51%	▲20.29
BSP	Syed Julfikar Hashni	3,919	3.96%	▼30.57
NCP	Baburao Basav	920	0.93%	New
Independent	Sridhar Bangle	644	0.65%	New
Margin of victory		10,814	10.93%	▲7.63
Turnout		99,156	53.29%	▲5.31
Total valid votes		98,929		
Registered electors		186,058		▲0.45
INC hold		Swing	▲2.19	

=== Assembly Election 2008 ===
2008 Karnataka Legislative Assembly election : Bidar
Party	Candidate	Votes	%	±%
INC	Dr. Gurupadappa Nagamarapalli	33,557	37.83%	▲34.63
BSP	Rahim Khan	30,627	34.53%	New
BJP	Raghunathrao Malkapure	20,561	23.18%	▲14.92
Independent	Suresh Swamy Manhalli	1,097	1.24%	New
JD(S)	Rajshri Shirikanth Swamy	1,086	1.22%	▼3.52
Margin of victory		2,930	3.30%	▼16.76
Turnout		88,880	47.98%	▼13.72
Total valid votes		88,700		
Registered electors		185,232		▼15.91
INC gain from Independent		Swing	▼11.54	

=== Assembly Election 2004 ===
2004 Karnataka Legislative Assembly election : Bidar
Party	Candidate	Votes	%	±%
Independent	Bandeppa Kashempur	67,019	49.37%	New
Independent	Syed Zulfekar Hashmi	39,784	29.31%	New
BJP	Revansiddappa Jalade	11,212	8.26%	▼25.54
JD(S)	Amruth Rao Chimkod	6,440	4.74%	▲3.66
INC	Rafat Mateen	4,343	3.20%	▼29.00
Kannada Nadu Party	Shivraj Patil Atiwal	1,270	0.94%	New
JP	Ashok Kumar Gadgi	928	0.68%	New
Independent	Suresh Swamy Manhalli	829	0.61%	New
Margin of victory		27,235	20.06%	▲18.46
Turnout		135,922	61.70%	▼4.34
Total valid votes		135,741		
Registered electors		220,278		▲7.91
Independent gain from BJP		Swing	▲15.57	

=== Assembly Election 1999 ===
1999 Karnataka Legislative Assembly election : Bidar
Party	Candidate	Votes	%	±%
BJP	Ramesh Kumar Pande	44,270	33.80%	▲15.47
INC	Bandeppa Kashempur	42,180	32.20%	▲26.94
BSP	Syed Zulfekar Hashmi	41,699	31.84%	▲5.67
JD(S)	N. F. Shaheen Patel	1,415	1.08%	New
Margin of victory		2,090	1.60%	▼2.05
Turnout		134,818	66.04%	▲8.06
Total valid votes		130,979		
Rejected ballots		3,839	2.85%	▲0.87
Registered electors		204,135		▲19.34
BJP gain from BSP		Swing	▲7.63	

=== Assembly Election 1994 ===
1994 Karnataka Legislative Assembly election : Bidar
Party	Candidate	Votes	%	±%
BSP	Syed Zulfekar Hashmi	25,433	26.17%	New
JD	Amruth Rao Chimkod	21,881	22.51%	New
BJP	Narayan Rao Manhalli	17,818	18.33%	▼13.47
Independent	Shant Kumar Chanda	10,893	11.21%	New
Independent	Maichal Joseph	8,285	8.52%	New
INC	Mohd Laiquddin Mohd. Burhanuddin	5,114	5.26%	▼24.51
INC	Afsar Khan Gadgi	1,241	1.28%	New
SP	Mahfooz Ali	1,202	1.24%	New
Kranti Sabha	Malshetty Basappa	1,080	1.11%	New
Margin of victory		3,552	3.65%	▲1.62
Turnout		99,168	57.98%	▲1.94
Total valid votes		97,200		
Rejected ballots		1,968	1.98%	▼5.11
Registered electors		171,049		▲13.64
BSP gain from BJP		Swing	▼5.63	

=== Assembly Election 1989 ===
1989 Karnataka Legislative Assembly election : Bidar
Party	Candidate	Votes	%	±%
BJP	Narayan Rao	24,922	31.80%	▼7.78
INC	Mohd Laiquddin Mohd. Burhanuddin	23,330	29.77%	▼15.48
JP	Amruth Rao	8,464	10.80%	New
Independent	M. Babu	6,069	7.74%	New
Independent	Vaijinath Rao	4,480	5.72%	New
CPI(M)	Sangram	2,877	3.67%	New
Independent	Shambhuling	2,588	3.30%	New
Independent	Shivsharnappa	1,754	2.24%	New
Bharatiya Minorities Suraksha Mahasangh	A. Khayum	951	1.21%	New
Margin of victory		1,592	2.03%	▼3.64
Turnout		84,352	56.04%	▲7.56
Total valid votes		78,372		
Rejected ballots		5,980	7.09%	▲5.50
Registered electors		150,514		▲28.89
BJP gain from INC		Swing	▼13.45	

=== Assembly Election 1985 ===
1985 Karnataka Legislative Assembly election : Bidar
Party	Candidate	Votes	%	±%
INC	Mohd Laiquddin Mohd. Burhanuddin	25,206	45.25%	New
BJP	Narayan Rao Manhalli	22,049	39.58%	▼9.30
JP	M. A. Hafeez Chanda	7,580	13.61%	▲8.64
Independent	Maruti Sagar Saidappa	501	0.90%	New
Margin of victory		3,157	5.67%	▼5.17
Turnout		56,610	48.48%	▼12.90
Total valid votes		55,710		
Rejected ballots		900	1.59%	▼0.29
Registered electors		116,774		▲23.86
INC gain from BJP		Swing	▼3.63	

=== Assembly Election 1983 ===
1983 Karnataka Legislative Assembly election : Bidar
Party	Candidate	Votes	%	±%
BJP	Narayan Rao Manhalli	27,756	48.88%	▲15.39
Independent	Mohsin Kamal	21,602	38.05%	New
JP	B. Narayan Rao Narasappa	2,823	4.97%	▼3.86
Independent	Sharanappa Mallappa Allapur	1,654	2.91%	New
Independent	Maruti Sagar Saidappa	1,486	2.62%	New
Independent	Shaik Syed	1,383	2.44%	New
Margin of victory		6,154	10.84%	▼0.13
Turnout		57,869	61.38%	
Total valid votes		56,779		
Rejected ballots		1,090	1.88%	
Registered electors		94,277		
BJP gain from INC		Swing	▲4.41	

=== Assembly By-election 1982 ===
1982 Karnataka Legislative Assembly by-election : Bidar
Party	Candidate	Votes	%	±%
INC	M. Kamal	17,766	44.47%	▲32.70
BJP	N. R. Manhally	13,381	33.49%	New
JP	K. R. Belur	3,529	8.83%	▼17.13
Independent	M. Sagar	2,709	6.78%	New
Independent	G. Qureshi	1,836	4.60%	New
Independent	S. Rudrappa	456	1.14%	New
Margin of victory		4,385	10.97%	▼20.32
Total valid votes		39,955		
INC gain from INC(I)		Swing	▼12.78	

=== Assembly Election 1978 ===
1978 Karnataka Legislative Assembly election : Bidar
Party	Candidate	Votes	%	±%
INC(I)	Veershetty Moglappa Kusnoor	29,809	57.25%	New
JP	Kashinath Gurappa	13,515	25.96%	New
INC	Mohd Laiquddin Mohd. Burhanuddin	6,128	11.77%	▼29.31
Independent	Brijpal Singh Gajrajisingh	2,188	4.20%	New
Independent	Jayanandrao Ekambar Lalojee	430	0.83%	New
Margin of victory		16,294	31.29%	▲25.56
Turnout		53,360	64.71%	▲10.04
Total valid votes		52,070		
Rejected ballots		1,290	2.42%	▲2.42
Registered electors		82,466		▲9.09
INC(I) gain from INC		Swing	▲16.17	

=== Assembly Election 1972 ===
1972 Mysore State Legislative Assembly election : Bidar
Party	Candidate	Votes	%	±%
INC	Manikrao. R. Phuleker	16,562	41.08%	▼1.39
Independent	G. Madivalappa Kheny	14,253	35.35%	New
INC(O)	S. A. Nabi Syed Sameb	6,862	17.02%	New
Independent	H. B. David	1,184	2.94%	New
Independent	Zhareppa Tukkappa	799	1.98%	New
Independent	Z. K. Mazhar Ali Khan	439	1.09%	New
Margin of victory		2,309	5.73%	▼9.34
Turnout		41,325	54.67%	▼10.32
Total valid votes		40,319		
Registered electors		75,596		▲25.60
INC gain from ABJS		Swing	▼16.45	

=== Assembly Election 1967 ===
1967 Mysore State Legislative Assembly election : Bidar
Party	Candidate	Votes	%	±%
ABJS	C. Gurupadappa	21,514	57.53%	New
INC	M. A. Khan	15,880	42.47%	▼25.38
Margin of victory		5,634	15.07%	▼23.50
Turnout		39,115	64.99%	▲22.84
Total valid votes		37,394		
Registered electors		60,186		▲15.42
ABJS gain from INC		Swing	▼10.32	

=== Assembly Election 1962 ===
1962 Mysore State Legislative Assembly election : Bidar
Party	Candidate	Votes	%	±%
INC	Maqsood Ali Khan	14,277	67.85%	▲17.06
PSP	R. V. Bidap	6,161	29.28%	▲10.30
RPI	Shivram Marothi	605	2.88%	New
Margin of victory		8,116	38.57%	▲18.01
Turnout		21,981	42.15%	▲16.09
Total valid votes		21,043		
Registered electors		52,145		▲9.30
INC hold		Swing	▲17.06	

=== Assembly Election 1957 ===
1957 Mysore State Legislative Assembly election : Bidar
Party	Candidate	Votes	%	±%
INC	Maqsood Ali Khan	6,314	50.79%	▼12.04
Independent	Rangnath Rao	3,758	30.23%	New
PSP	Veerapakshappa	2,360	18.98%	New
Margin of victory		2,556	20.56%	▼22.25
Turnout		12,432	26.06%	▼5.92
Total valid votes		12,432		
Registered electors		47,709		▼5.95
INC hold		Swing	▼12.04	

=== Assembly Election 1952 ===
1952 Hyderabad State Legislative Assembly election : Bidar
Party	Candidate	Votes	%	±%
INC	Shafiuddin	10,192	62.83%	New
Socialist Party (India)	Veerashetti	3,248	20.02%	New
PDF	Rangnath Sheti	2,782	17.15%	New
Margin of victory		6,944	42.81%	
Turnout		16,222	31.98%	
Total valid votes		16,222		
Registered electors		50,725		
INC win (new seat)				

== See also ==
- List of constituencies of Karnataka Legislative Assembly
