= Ashok Kheny =

Indian film actor, politician, film director, film producer, businessman

- Born: Ashok Shankarappa Kheny; 5 October 1949 (age 76); Ranjolkheni, Bidar district, Mysore State (present–day Karnataka), India
- Education: Electrical engineer
- Alma mater: National Institute of Technology Karnataka; Worcester Polytechnic Institute
- Occupations: Politician; Managing Director of SAB, Philadelphia and Nandi Infrastructure Corridor Enterprise
- Employer: Bangalore-Mysore Infrastructure Corridor
- Known for: Bangalore - Mysore Infrastructure Corridor (BMIC)
- Board member of: Honorary Chairman, IIC
- Spouse: Rita Kheny (m. 1992)
- Children: 2
Ashok Kheny
Chairman of the Nandi Infrastructure Corridor Enterprises Limited
- Incumbent
- Assumed office 1995
Member of the Karnataka Legislative Assembly
- In office 9 May 2013 – 15 May 2018
- Preceded by: Bandeppa Kashempur
- Succeeded by: Bandeppa Kashempur
- Constituency: Bidar South
Personal details
- Party: Indian National Congress (since 5 March 2018)
- Other political affiliations: Karnataka Makkala Paksha (until 5 March 2018)
- Website: www.ashokkheny.in

Ashok Shankarappa Kheny is an Indian film producer, actor, director, businessman, politician, and owner of the Karnataka Bulldozers cricket team. He is a chairman of the Indian Institute of Cartoonists, and Managing Director of the Nandi Infrastructure Corridor Enterprises Limited based in Bengaluru. He was founder-president of the Karnataka Makkal Paksha until joining Indian National Congress party. He is the Director of IIIE Limited. He was Member of the Karnataka Legislative Assembly from Bidar South Assembly constituency from 9 May 2013 to 15 May 2018.

He is a graduate of Electrical Engineering from National Institute of Technology Karnataka.

Kheny has been in the news for his scuffles with the former Prime Minister of India H. D. Deve Gowda over the land acquisition for the BMIC project.

Kheny received the Outstanding Businessman of the Year from a Minority community award for 1987, conferred by the then President of the United States Ronald Reagan.

Kheny owns the cricket team Karnataka Bulldozers in the Celebrity Cricket League.

== Indian Institute of Cartoonists ==
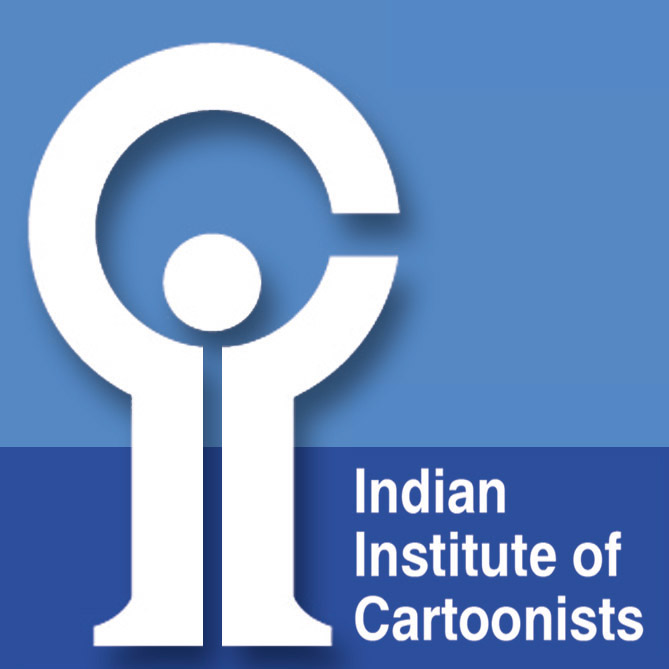
Logo of IIC

In 2004, Kheny, an ardent admirer of cartoons, became an Honorary Chairman of the Indian Institute of Cartoonists. He dedicated the institute 5000 square feet of premises in the heart of Bangalore to establish the Indian Cartoon Gallery, the first of its kind in India.
