= National Development Party =

National Development Party can refer to:

- National Development Party (Bahamas)
- National Development Party (Brunei)
- National Development Party (Burma)
- National Development Party (Kenya)
- National Development Party (Montserrat)
- National Development Party (Syria)
- National Development Party (Thailand)
- National Development Party (Trinidad and Tobago)
- National Development Party (Turkey)
- Rastriya Bikas Party (Nepal)
