= Gurupadappa Nagamarapalli =

Indian politician

Dr. Gurupadappa Nagamarapalli

Minister of Home Department excluding Intelligence Wing of Karnataka
- In office 15 April 1989 – 21 April 1989

Minister of Forest and Ecology of Karnataka
- In office 1996–1999

Member of Karnataka Legislative Assembly
- In office 2013 – 17 November 2015
- Preceded by: Rahim Khan
- Succeeded by: Rahim Khan
- Constituency: Bidar
- In office 2008–2009
- Preceded by: Bandeppa Kashempur
- Succeeded by: Rahim Khan
- Constituency: Bidar
- In office 2004–2008
- Preceded by: Gundappa Biradar (Vakil)
- Succeeded by: Prabhu Chauhan
- Constituency: Aurad
- In office 1985–1999
- Preceded by: Manik Rao Patil
- Succeeded by: Gundappa Biradar (Vakil)
- Constituency: Aurad

Minister of Forests and Ecology of Karnataka
- In office 2005–2006
- Preceded by: K. N. Gaddi
- Succeeded by: C. Chennigappa

Personal details
- Born: Gurupadappa Sanganabasappa Nagamarapalli; 11 November 1942 Nagmarpalli
- Died: 17 November 2015 (aged 74) Bangalore
- Cause of death: Heart attack
- Resting place: Chintaki
- Party: Bharatiya Janata Party
- Other political affiliations: Karnataka Janata Paksha; Indian National Congress; Janata Dal; Janata Party
- Children: 3, including: Suryakanth Nagamarapalli; Umakanth Nagamarapalli; Vijaykumar Nagamarapalli
- Parent: Sanganbasappa Gode (father)
- Education: SSLC
- Occupation: Politician

Dr. Gurupadappa Sanganabasappa Nagamarapalli (11 November 1942 – 17 November 2015) was an Indian veteran politician and businessman who served as the Minister of Home Affairs of Karnataka from 15 April 1989 to 21 April 1989. He was also Minister of Forest and Ecology of Karnataka from 1996 to 1999 and again from 2005 to 2006. He was the six term Member of the Karnataka Legislative Assembly (four terms from the Aurad constituency and two terms from the Bidar North Constituency).

== Early life and education ==
He was born on 11 November 1942 in Nagamarapalli village, Aurad taluka, Bidar district. He was the son of Sanganabasappa Gode. and completed his Secondary School Leaving Certificate (SSLC).

== Political career ==
Nagamarapalli began his political career through the Janata movement in Karnataka and was elected to the Karnataka Legislative Assembly from the Aurad constituency in 1985.

During his legislative career, he served in different political parties including the Janata Party, Janata Dal, Indian National Congress and Bharatiya Janata Party. He held ministerial positions in successive Karnataka governments and served as Minister of Home Affairs in 1989. He later served as Minister of Forests and Ecology during separate terms in office.

After the leaving the Janata Parivar, Nagamarapalli joined the Indian National Congress and later became associated with the Bharatiya Janata Party. He also contested state assembly elections.

== Co-operative ==
Dr. Gurupadappa Nagamarapalli has played a role in establishing the District Cooperative Central Bank Bidar. The Bidar DCCB rural lending model specifically has received recognition from Bankers, NGOs, and stakeholders from across India and other regions, including an honorary doctorate from Gulbarga University Kalburgi. His eldest son Sri. Umakanth Nagamarapalli also works in the field of Cooperative and Micro Credit Lending.
