= 2016 Chandigarh Municipal Corporation election =

Local body election in India

2016 Chandigarh Municipal corporation election
- 18 December 2016
- All 26 seats of the Chandigarh Municipal Corporation; 14 seats needed for a majority
Party	Leader	Vote %	Seats	+/–
BJP			20	+10
INC			4	−7
SAD			1	−1
Independent			1	0
This lists parties that won seats. See the complete results below.
Majority before	Majority after
?	Bharatiya Janata Party

The elections for the Chandigarh Municipal Corporation were held on 18 December 2016. The candidates were in fray for the election to 26 seats (wards) of Chandigarh union territory. The Bharatiya Janata Party won the election in a landslide, securing 20 of the 26 seats.

The BJP won 20 seats and became the single largest party in the council of total 26 elected seats. Congress won 4 seats, SAD won 1 and Independent candidate won 1 seat each.

After the election Ravi Kant Sharma served as Mayor of Chandigarh till 2021. upon succeeding Raj Bala Malik.

2021 Chandigarh Municipal Corporation election were held on 24 December 2021 after the term of the previous elected council had expired.

== Background ==
In the 2011 Chandigarh Municipal Corporation election Congress had won 11 seats out of total 25. Congress was the largest party followed by BJP with 10 seats, SAD with 2 seats, BSP with 1 and 1 independent.

== Results ==
Chandigarh Municipal Corporation
Party	Seats won	Seats +/−	Vote %
Bharatiya Janata Party	20	▲10	
Indian National Congress	4	▼7	
Shiromani Akali Dal	1	▼1	
Independent	1	Steady	

== Members ==
Municipal Corporation Chandigarh

Type
- Type: Municipal Corporation of Union Territory of Chandigarh

History
- Founded: May 24, 1994

Leadership
- Municipal Commissioner: Anindita Mitra, IAS since 2021
- Mayor: Ravi Kant Sharma, Bharatiya Janata Party since 8 January 2021
- Deputy Mayor: Farmila, Bharatiya Janata Party since 8 January 2021

Structure
- Seats: 35 (26 elected + 9 nominated)
- Political groups: Ruling (29): BJP (20); Nominated (9); Opposition (6): INC (4); SAD (1); IND (1)
- Length of term: 5 years

Elections
- Last election: December 2011
- Next election: 24 December 2021

Meeting place
- New Deluxe Building, Sector 17, Chandigarh

Website
- www.mcchandigarh.gov.in

Ravi Kant Sharma served as Mayor of Chandigarh.

=== Elected Councillors ===
Ward No.	Councillor	Party
1	Mahesh Inder Singh	Bharatiya Janata Party
2	Raj Bala Malik	Bharatiya Janata Party
3	Ravi Kant Sharma	Bharatiya Janata Party
4	Sunita Dhawan	Bharatiya Janata Party
5	Sheela Devi	Indian National Congress
6	Farmila	Bharatiya Janata Party
7	Rajesh Kumar	Bharatiya Janata Party
8	Arun Sood	Bharatiya Janata Party
9	Gurbax Rawat	Indian National Congress
10	Hardeep Singh	Shiromani Akali Dal
11	Satish Kumar	Bharatiya Janata Party
12	Chanderwati Shukla	Bharatiya Janata Party
13	Heera Negi	Bharatiya Janata Party
14	Kanwarjeet Singh	Bharatiya Janata Party
15	Ravinder Kaur	Indian National Congress
16	Rajesh Kumar Gupta	Bharatiya Janata Party
17	Asha Kumari Jaswal	Bharatiya Janata Party
18	Devinder Singh Babla	Indian National Congress
19	Dalip Sharma	Independent
20	Shakti Parkash Devshali	Bharatiya Janata Party
21	Gurpreet Singh	Bharatiya Janata Party
22	Davesh Moudgil	Bharatiya Janata Party
23	Bharat Kumar	Bharatiya Janata Party
24	Anil Kumar Dube	Bharatiya Janata Party
25	Jagtar Singh	Bharatiya Janata Party
26	Vinod Aggarwal	Bharatiya Janata Party

=== Nominated Councillors ===
Sr. No.	Councillor
1	Charanjiv Singh
2	Ajay Dutta
3	Sachin Kumar Lohtiya
4	Haji Mohd. Khurshid Ali
5	Dr. Joytsna Wig
6	Shipra Bansal
7	Sat Parkash Aggarwal
8	Kamla Sharma
9	Maj. Gen. M. S. Kandal

== Mayor ==
The mayor is the head of the Municipal Corporation. Ravi Kant Sharma was serving as the mayor of the city at the time of the next election.

List of mayors of Chandigarh from 2017 to 2021

Name	Term
Asha Kumari Jaswal	12 January 2017 – 8 January 2018
Davesh Moudgil	9 January 2018 – 18 January 2019
Rajesh Kumar Kalia	19 January 2019 – 9 January 2020
Raj Bala Malik (2nd term)	10 January 2020 – 7 January 2021
Ravi Kant Sharma	8 January 2021 – December 2021

== Aftermath ==
The Chandigarh Municipal Corporation council completed its tenure of 5 years. After the council's term had expired, 2021 Chandigarh Municipal Corporation election were held.
