= Amarpur, Tripura Assembly constituency =

Legislative Assembly constituency in Tripura state, India

Coordinates: 23.52°N 91.64°E

Amarpur
- Constituency No. 42 for the Tripura Legislative Assembly

Constituency details
- Country: India
- Region: Northeast India
- State: Tripura
- District: Gomati
- Lok Sabha constituency: Tripura East
- Established: 2008
- Total electors: 43,687
- Reservation: None

Member of Legislative Assembly
- 13th Tripura Legislative Assembly
- Incumbent Ranjit Das
- Party: BJP
- Elected year: 2023

Amarpur Legislative Assembly constituency is one of the 60 Legislative Assembly constituencies of Tripura state in India.

It is part of Gomati district. As of 2023, it is represented by Ranjit Das of the Bharatiya Janata Party.

== Members of the Legislative Assembly ==
Election	Member	Party
2013	Manoranjan Acharjee	Communist Party of India
2016 by-election	Parimal Debnath	Communist Party of India
2018	Ranjit Das	Bharatiya Janata Party
2023	Ranjit Das	Bharatiya Janata Party

== Election results ==
=== 2023 Assembly election ===
2023 Tripura Legislative Assembly election: Amarpur
Party	Candidate	Votes	%	±%
BJP	Ranjit Das	17,989	44.21%	▼4.66
CPI(M)	Parimal Debnath	13,395	32.92%	New
TMP	Ashiram Reang	8,116	19.94%	New
AITC	Biplab Kumar Saha	431	1.06%	▲0.40
NOTA	None of the Above	350	0.86%	▼0.02
RPI(A)	Amal Majumder	272	0.67%	New
Margin of victory		4,594	11.29%	▲8.67
Turnout		40,693	93.30%	▼2.38
Registered electors		43,687		▲7.51
BJP hold		Swing	▼4.66	

=== 2018 Assembly election ===
2018 Tripura Legislative Assembly election: Amarpur
Party	Candidate	Votes	%	±%
BJP	Ranjit Das	18,970	48.87%	▲19.72
CPI(M)	Parimal Debnath	17,954	46.25%	New
NOTA	None of the Above	340	0.88%	New
INC	Biplab Kumar Saha	312	0.80%	▼2.87
AITC	Subir Sen Ghosh	255	0.66%	New
Tipraland State Party	Pabitra Mohan Jamatia	212	0.55%	New
Margin of victory		1,016	2.62%	▼29.04
Turnout		38,818	94.05%	▲8.23
Registered electors		40,634		▲5.96
BJP gain from CPI(M)		Swing	▼11.93	

=== 2016 Assembly by-election ===
2016 Tripura Legislative Assembly by-election: Amarpur
Party	Candidate	Votes	%	±%
CPI(M)	Parimal Debnath	20,355	60.80%	▲6.08
BJP	Ranjit Das	9,758	29.15%	▲27.97
IPFT	Pabitra Mohan Jamatia	1,623	4.85%	New
INC	Chanchal Dey	1,231	3.68%	▼39.51
NOTA	None of the Above	264	0.79%	New
Independent	Ranajoy Jamatia	216	0.65%	New
Margin of victory		10,597	31.65%	▲20.12
Turnout		33,478	87.99%	▼7.97
Registered electors		38,348		
CPI(M) hold		Swing	▲6.08	

=== 2013 Assembly election ===
2013 Tripura Legislative Assembly election: Amarpur
Party	Candidate	Votes	%	±%
CPI(M)	Manoranjan Acharjee	19,075	54.72%	New
INC	Niranjan Barman	15,053	43.18%	New
BJP	Mahi Bhusan Chakraborty	410	1.18%	New
AMB	Bijoy Das	321	0.92%	New
Margin of victory		4,022	11.54%	
Turnout		34,859	95.70%	
Registered electors		36,588		
CPI(M) win (new seat)				

== See also ==
- List of constituencies of the Tripura Legislative Assembly
- Gomati district
