= Ranjit Das (politician) =

Indian politician (born 1964)

Ranjit Das (born 1964) is an Indian politician from Tripura. He is a member of the Tripura Legislative Assembly from the Amarpur, Tripura Assembly constituency in Gomati district. He won the 2023 Tripura Legislative Assembly election, representing the Bharatiya Janata Party.

== Early life and education ==
Das is from Amarpur, Gomati district, Tripura. He is the son of late Ramesh Das. He studied Class 12 at Amarpur High School and passed in 1998.

== Career ==
Das won the Amarpur Assembly constituency representing the Bharatiya Janata Party in the 2023 Tripura Legislative Assembly election. He polled 17,989 votes and defeated his nearest rival, Parimal Debnath of the Communist Party of India (Marxist), by a margin of 4,594 votes. He first became an MLA winning the 2018 Tripura Legislative Assembly election defeating the same opponent, by a margin of 1016 votes.
