= Rahim Khan (Indian politician) =

Indian politician (born 1964)

Cabinet Minister, Government of Karnataka
- In office 27 May 2023 – 29 May 2026
- Governor: Thawarchand Gehlot
- Cabinet: Second Siddaramaiah ministry
- Chief Minister: Siddaramaiah
- Ministry and Departments: Municipal Administration; Hajj

Member of Karnataka Legislative Assembly
- Incumbent
- Assumed office 2016
- Preceded by: Gurupadappa Nagamarapalli
- Constituency: Bidar
- In office 2009–2013
- Preceded by: Gurupadappa Nagamarapalli
- Succeeded by: Gurupadappa Nagamarapalli
- Constituency: Bidar

Minister of State for Youth Empowerment and Sports of Karnataka
- In office 22 December 2018 – 8 July 2019
- Preceded by: Pramod Madhwaraj
- Succeeded by: K. S. Eshwarappa

Personal details
- Born: 1 May 1966 (age 60) Bidar, Mysuru State (Present-day Karnataka), India
- Party: Indian National Congress
- Spouse(s): Ayesha Begum Seema Aiman (m. 1998)
- Education: PUC
- Occupation: Politician

Rahim Khan (born 1 May 1964) is an Indian politician from Karnataka. He is a three-time MLA and he served as a Cabinet Minister in the Government of Karnataka and as a Member of the Karnataka Legislative Assembly representing Bidar.

He was the Minister of State for Youth Empowerment and Sports of Karnataka from 22 December 2018 to 8 July 2019.

== Career ==
Khan is a three-time MLA from Bidar Constituency. He represents the Indian National Congress. He won the 2023 Karnataka Legislative Assembly Election defeating Suryakanth Nagamarpalli of Janata Dal (S) by a margin of 10,780 votes. He won the 2018 Karnataka Legislative Assembly Election as MLA from the Bidar seat for the second time representing Indian National Congress. In 2018, he defeated Surayakanth Nagmarpalli of BJP by a margin of 10,245 votes. In 2016 by-poll, Khan won the Bidar seat for the first time. Rahim Khan has been appointed as Chairman for Karnataka Warehousing Corporation in 2016.
