= 2021 Chandigarh Municipal Corporation election =

Local body election in India

- 24 December 2021
- All 35 seats of the Chandigarh Municipal Corporation; 18 seats needed for a majority
- Turnout: 60.7%
Party	Leader	Vote %	Seats	+/–
AAP		27.08%	14	+14
BJP		29.30%	12	−8
INC		29.79%	8	+4
SAD		2.78%	1	0
This lists parties that won seats. See the complete results below.
2021 Chandigarh Municipal Corporation election structure
Elected before	Elected after
BJP	Sarabjit Kaur; BJP

The elections for the Chandigarh Municipal Corporation were held on 24 December 2021. 203 candidates campaigned for 35 seats in the Chandigarh election. Election results were declared on 27 December 2021.

Contesting the Chandigarh Municipal Corporation elections for the first time, Aam Aadmi Party (AAP) won 14 seats and became the single largest party in the council of total 35 elected seats. BJP again formed the government and secured the mayor post due to defections and cross voting.

During the vote for mayor election, Congress and Shiromani Akali Dal did not vote. One Congress Councillor defected and joined BJP and one AAP vote was declared invalid. Bhartiya Janata Party's Sarabjit Kaur was elected as the new mayor of Chandigarh with 14 votes in support and 13 against. AAP had disputed the mayor election and appealed in the Punjab and Haryana High Court to quash the election of mayor, citing irregularities in the process though it was rejected.

== Background ==
2016 Chandigarh Municipal Corporation election was won by Bharatiya Janata Party (BJP) + Shiromani Akali Dal (SAD) alliance. In the 2019 Indian general election, Chandigarh (Lok Sabha constituency) was won by BJP.

In the 2021 Chandigarh Municipal Corporation election, SAD and BJP contested separately without an alliance. Aam Aadmi Party (AAP) contested this election for the first time.

The number of wards of the corporation were increased from 26 in 2016 to 35 in the 2021 election.

== Major issues of the electorate ==
Corporation increased the water tariff. This created a widespread discontent among the residents.

Garbage from the city was not disposed of properly. The lack of a proper process or mechanism led to the garbage piling up at Dadumajra.

Elections were also fought on corruption charges for which several senior AAP leaders were jailed and liquor scam.

== Campaign ==
=== AAP ===
AAP tried to reach out to voters by promising AAP parking, waste management, water supply and education. The candidates reached out to the voters and promised to bring a change if elected. The high pitched campaign in Punjab by AAP also contributed to their campaign in Chandigarh.

==== Star Campaigners ====
- Arvind Kejriwal
- Bhagwant Mann
- Raghav Chadha
- Sanjay Singh
- Jarnail Singh
- Harpal Singh Cheema

=== BJP ===
During the campaign, the BJP candidates were relying on the popularity of the BJP Prime Minister Narendra Modi. BJP tried to promote the work done under the Premiership of Narendra Modi.

==== Star Campaigners ====
- Amit Shah
- JP Nadda
- Anurag Thakur
- Pushkar Singh Dhami
- Jai Ram Thakur
- Yogi Adityanath

== Polling Process ==
Around 6.3 lakh voters were eligible to cast their votes. The wards were increased from 26 to 35. 694 polling booths were set up across Chandigarh. No VVPAT machines were used in this election. 60% votes were recorded in the election.

The Chandigarh administration declared 22, 23, 24 and 27 December as dry day and prohibited the sale and serving of liquor on these days, during the election and counting. Polls were counted on 27 December. Nine counting centers were set up for 35 wards.

== Results ==
Contesting the Chandigarh Municipal Corporation elections for the first time, the Aam Aadmi Party won 14 seats and whereas the Indian National Congress won a plurality of the vote. Sitting mayor Ravi Kant Sharma and former mayor Davesh Moudgil from BJP lost.

=== Overall results ===
Chandigarh Municipal Corporation
Party	Seats won	Seats +/−	Vote %
Aam Aadmi Party	14	▲14	27.08%
Bharatiya Janata Party	12	▼8	29.30%
Indian National Congress	8	▲4	29.79%
Shiromani Akali Dal	1	Steady	2.78%
Bahujan Samaj Party	0	Steady	2.14%
Samajwadi Party	0	Steady	1.02%
Independents	0	Steady	7.10%
NOTA	N/A		1.34

=== Ward Wise Results ===
Ward No.	Councillor	Party
1	Jaswinder Kaur	AAP
2	Maheshinder Singh Sidhu	BJP
3	Dalip Sharma	BJP
4	Suman Devi	AAP
5	Darshana	INC
6	Sarbajit Kaur	BJP
7	Manoj Kumar	BJP
8	Harjeet Singh	BJP
9	Bimala Dubey	BJP
10	Harpreet Kaur Babla	INC
11	Anup Gupta	BJP
12	Saurabh Joshi	BJP
13	Sachin Galav	INC
14	Kuljeet Sandhu	BJP
15	Ram Chander Yadav	AAP
16	Poonam	AAP
17	Damanpreet Singh	AAP
18	Taruna Mehta	AAP
19	Neha	AAP
20	Gurcharanjit Singh	INC
21	Jasbir Singh	AAP
22	Anju Katyal	AAP
23	Prem Lata	AAP
24	Jasbir Singh	INC
25	Yogesh Dhingra	AAP
26	Kuldeep Kumar	AAP
27	Gurbax Rawat	INC
28	Nirmala Devi	INC
29	Manaur	AAP
30	Hardeep Singh	SAD
31	Lakhbir Singh	AAP
32	Jasmanpreet Singh Babbar	BJP
33	Kanwarjit Rana	BJP
34	Gurpeet Singh	INC
35	Rajinder Kumar Sharma	BJP

== Aftermath ==
On 30 December 2021, Arvind Kejriwal took part in a road show to express gratitude towards Chandigarh people.

Ravi Kant Sharma was the sitting mayor at the time of election. He lost his seat to Damanpreet Singh, an AAP candidate. Of the five-year term of the MC House, the MCC mayor seat during the first and fourth years is reserved for the women. 2022 being the first year of the term, is reserved for women mayor.

=== Mayor election ===
3 January was the last date for submission of nominations for the post of the mayor, senior deputy mayor and deputy mayor of Chandigarh Municipal Corporation. New office holders for these posts will be elected on 8 January 2022, in the assembly hall of the Chandigarh municipal corporation (CMC). BJP councilor Maheshinder Singh Sidhu will be presiding the mayor election.

A party has to win 19 wards so that its councilor can be elected as the mayor. After the election no party held a clear majority and AAP remains the single largest party with 14 councilors. The contest for Mayor seat was between AAP with 14 seats and BJP with 12 seats. Congress with 8 seats was out of the Mayor race.

On 2 January, ward 10 councilor who won the election on Congress party ticket, joined BJP and increased BJP strength to 13. The Chandigarh MP also has a vote in the house. Kirron Kher is the BJP MP from the Chandigarh seat. Adding these two votes in support of BJP, the BJP's vote tally became 14 (same as AAP). 19 votes are needed to get elected as a Mayor.

To prevent the members from engaging in cross party votes or changing their party, AAP moved its newly elected councilors to Delhi and Congress shifted their councilors to Jaipur. AAP claimed that the Delhi visit of their councilors was planned in advance.

=== Voting ===
Congress and SAD abstained from voting in the mayor election. BJP and AAP took part in voting. Out of 28 total votes, BJP candidate got 14 votes and AAP candidate Anju Katyal got 13 votes. One vote of AAP party was declared invalid. BJP's Sarabjit Kaur was elected as new mayor of Chandigarh. There was ruckus in the council, AAP councilors protested against the nullification of one AAP vote and claimed that BJP was favoured in the counting process. AAP called the mayor election "shocking death of democracy", and accused the District Collector of illegally electing the mayor Candidate from BJP despite AAP winning more seats in the council.

=== Challenge in Supreme Court ===
AAP challenged the results of the mayor election in the Punjab and Haryana High Court. In their petition, AAP sought quashing of the 8 January polls and re-election of the mayor.

According to the mayoral election norms, only a nominated councilor can become the presiding officer overseeing the polling for the mayor. The plea alleged that the process to select this nominated councillor was delayed and BJP's Maheshinder Singh Sidhu was chosen as the presiding officer.

During the mayoral polls, according to AAP, a torn vote in support of the BJP was accepted as valid, but another vote that had a tick mark in favor of the AAP Candidate was declared invalid and not counted. AAP had questioned this in their petition to the High Court. However, the court rejected their application and termed the election fair.
