= Chandigarh Municipal Corporation =

Local civic body in Chandigarh, India

Municipal Corporation Chandigarh

Type
- Type: Municipal corporation of Union Territory of Chandigarh

History
- Founded: May 24, 1994

Leadership
- Mayor: Saurabh Joshi, BJP since 29 January 2026
- Senior Deputy Mayor: Jasmanpreet Singh Babbar, BJP since 29 January 2026
- Deputy Mayor: Suman Sharma, BJP since 29 January 2026
- Municipal Commissioner: Amit Kumar, IAS

Structure
- Seats: 45 (35 elected + 1 member of parliament + 9 nominated)
- Political groups: Government (18): BJP (18); Official Opposition (11): AAP (11); Other Opposition (7): INC (6 + 1 MP vote Manish Tewari); Nominated (9): NOM (9)
- Length of term: 5 years

Elections
- Last election: 24 December 2021
- Next election: 23 December 2026

Meeting place
- New Deluxe Building, Sector 17, Chandigarh

Website
- chandigarh.gov.in

The Municipal Corporation Chandigarh (MCC), also known as Chandigarh Municipal Corporation, is the civic body that governs the city of Chandigarh, the capital of Punjab and Haryana.

== History ==
The Municipal Corporation of Chandigarh, India was formed within the Union Territory of Chandigarh under the Punjab Municipal Corporation Act in 1976. The corporation was later extended to the union territory, Chandigarh, by the Punjab Municipal Corporation Law (Extension to Chandigarh) Act, 1994 (Act No.45 of 1994), which came into effect on 24 May 1994. Under a provision of Section 47 of the act, M.P. Tyagi was appointed as the first Commissioner of the Corporation w.e.f. on 19 June 1995. Tyagi continued to exercise mayoral powers until 23 December 1994, when the first meeting of the elected body of the Corporation was held. Tyagi was succeeded as Commissioner by S.K. Gathwal on 8 August 1996.

In the Municipal Corporation, BJP candidate Arun Sood defeated Congress' Mukesh Bassi by 21–15 votes for the post of Mayor, while BJP's Davesh Moudgil and SAD's Hardeep Singh defeated Congress' Darshan Garg and Gurbax Rawat for the posts of Sr. Deputy Mayor and Deputy Mayor, respectively, in the Municipal Corporation's mayoral polls in January 2016.

After the 2016 Chandigarh Municipal Corporation election in January 2017, BJP's Asha Kumari Jaswal was elected as the mayor, BJP's Rajesh Kumar Gupta and Anil Dubey were elected as senior deputy mayor and deputy mayor respectively. In January 2019, Mayor elections, BJP candidate Rajesh Kumar Kalia was elected as the Mayor by defeating the independent candidate Satish Kainth by securing 16 votes out of the total 27 votes.

Ravi Kant Sharma served as Mayor of Chandigarh till 2021 upon succeeding Raj Bala Malik.

2021 Chandigarh Municipal Corporation election was held on 24 December 2021. Sarbjit Kaur was elected as the Mayor of the civic body after the elections.

== List of mayors ==
The mayor is the head of the Municipal Corporation. Of the five-year term of the Municipal Corporation, Office of the Mayor, for the first and fourth years, is reserved for women.

S. No.	Name	Term	Party
1.	Kamla Sharma	23 December 1996 – 22 December 1997	
2.	Gian Chand Gupta	23 December 1997 – 22 December 1998	
3.	Kewal Krishan Addiwal	23 December 1998 – 22 December 1999	
4.	Shanta Hit Abhilashi	23 December 1999 – 22 December 2000	
5.	Raj Kumar Goyal	23 December 2000 – 21 July 2001	
6.	Gurcharan Dass (acting)	22 July 2001 – 17 August 2001	
7.	Harjinder Kaur	18 August 2001 – 22 December 2001	
8.	Lalit Joshi	1 January 2002 – 31 December 200	
9.	Subhash Chawla	1 January 2003 – 31 December 2003	
10.	Kamlesh	1 January 2004 – 31 December 2004	
11.	Anu Chatrath	1 January 2005 – 31 December 2005	
12.	Surinder Singh	1 January 2006 – 31 December 2006	
(7).	Harjinder Kaur	1 January 2007 – 31 December 2007	
13.	Pardeep Chhabra	1 January 2008 – 31 December 2008	
(10).	Kamlesh	1 January 2009 – 31 December 2009	
(11).	Anu Chatrath	1 January 2010 – 31 December 2010	
14.	Ravinder Pal Singh	1 January 2011 – 31 December 2011	
15.	Raj Bala Malik	1 January 2012 – 31 December 2012	
(9).	Subhash Chawla	1 January 2013 – 31 December 2013	
16.	Harphool Chander Kalyan	1 January 2014 – 5 January 2015	
17.	Poonam Sharma	6 January 2015 – 7 January 2016	
18.	Arun Sood	8 January 2016 – 31 December 2016	
19.	Asha Kumari Jaswal	12 January 2017 – 8 January 2018	
20.	Davesh Moudgil	9 January 2018 – 18 January 2019	
21.	Rajesh Kumar Kalia	19 January 2019 – 9 January 2020	
22.	Rajbala Malik	10 January 2020 – 7 January 2021	Bharatiya Janata Party
23.	Ravi Kant Sharma	8 January 2021 – 7 January 2022	Bharatiya Janata Party
24.	Sarabjit Kaur	8 January 2022 – 16 January 2023	Bharatiya Janata Party
25.	Anup Gupta	17 January 2023 – 30 January 2024	Bharatiya Janata Party
26.	Manoj Sonkar	30 January 2024 – 18 February 2024	Bharatiya Janata Party
27.	Kuldeep Kumar	20 February 2024 - 30 January 2025	Aam Aadmi Party
28.	Harpreet Kaur Babla	30 January 2025 – 29 January 2026	Bharatiya Janata Party
29.	Saurabh Joshi	29 January 2026 – Incumbent	Bharatiya Janata Party

== Composition ==
According to the Municipal Corporation Chandigarh's website, the Corporation is composed of the following members:

1	"Members to be directly elected, representing wards."	35
2	"Members with voting rights to be nominated by the Administrator, from amongst the people who are eminent of distinguished in public affairs or those who have special knowledge or practical experience in respect of municipal administration."	10
3	"The Member of the House of the people representing the constituency which comprises wholly or partly, the Municipal Area, with the right to vote. (Member of Parliament from Chandigarh)"	1

== Administration ==
The commissioner is the apex of the municipal administrative hierarchy that runs its administration. He is a senior government official (usually an I.A.S officer) and is appointed by the Central government. He is the chief executive officer who is responsible for the passing and implementation of the annual municipal corporation budget, its policies and programmes. All personnel of the municipal corporation work under the commissioner's supervision and control.

The current municipal commissioner of the Municipal Corporation Chandigarh is Amit Kumar.

Chandigarh being a city-state, and a Union Territory does not have a legislative assembly of its own, even though it hosts the legislative assemblies of two states Punjab & Haryana, being a common capital of both states. It has its own Municipal Corporation (MCC), which acts as the local governing authority of the City Beautiful (Chandigarh). The MCC is one of the most powerful local authorities in the Republic of India as it serves both as a regional and local authority.

== Departments ==
Accounts Branch	Engineering Branch	Parking Branch
Agenda Branch	Establishment Branch	Public Health Branch
Architecture Branch	Estate Branch	Public Relation Branch
B&R Branch	Fire & Rescue Services Branch	RTI Branch
Booking Branch	Horticulture & Electrical Branch	Rural Branch
Building Branch	IT Branch	Solid Waste Management (SWM)
Colony Branch	Legal Branch	Tax Branch
Complaint & Grievance Branch	Licensing Branch	Vendor Cell
Deendayal Antyodaya Yojana National Urban Livelihoods Mission (Day-NULM)	Medical Officer of Health (MOH)	
Enforcement Branch	Monitoring Branch	

== Composition of MCC House ==
Contesting the 2021 Chandigarh Municipal Corporation election for the first time, Aam Aadmi Party won 14 seats in the council of total 35 elected seats. However, the BJP managed to retain the power in the house, following defections and it later became the single largest party in the house. Sitting mayor Ravi Kant Sharma from BJP lost his seat to AAP candidate Damanpreet Singh.

Composition of Chandigarh Municipal Corporation (October 2025)
Party	Seats
Bharatiya Janata Party	18
Aam Aadmi Party	11
Indian National Congress	6
Nominated	9
Member of Parliament	1

== Current members ==
=== Elected councillors ===
Mayor: Saurabh Joshi
Senior Deputy Mayor: Jasmanpreet Singh Babbar
Deputy Mayor: Suman Sharma
Ward No.	Councillor	Party	Remarks
1	Jaswinder Kaur	AAP	
2	Maheshinder Singh Sidhu	BJP	
3	Dalip Sharma	BJP	
4	Suman Sharma	BJP	Elected as AAP candidate, later defected to BJP
5	Darshana	INC	
6	Sarabjit Kaur	BJP	
7	Manoj Sonkar	BJP	
8	Harjeet Singh	BJP	
9	Bimala Dubey	BJP	
10	Harpreet Kaur Babla	BJP	Elected as INC candidate, later defected to BJP.
11	Anup Gupta	BJP	
12	Saurabh Joshi	BJP	
13	Sachin Galav	INC	
14	Kuljeet Sandhu	BJP	
15	Ram Chander Yadav	AAP	
16	Poonam	BJP	Elected as AAP candidate, defected to BJP after election.
17	Damanpreet Singh	AAP	
18	Taruna Mehta	INC	Elected as AAP candidate, defected to INC after the election.
19	Neha Musawat	BJP	Elected as AAP candidate, defected to BJP after election.
20	Gurcharan Jeet Singh Kala	BJP	Elected as INC candidate, defected to BJP, then to AAP and then again to BJP after the election.
21	Jasbir Singh	AAP	
22	Anju Katyal	AAP	
23	Prem Lata	AAP	
24	Jasbir Singh Bunty	INC	
25	Yogesh Dhingra	AAP	
26	Kuldeep Kumar	AAP	
27	Gurbax Rawat	BJP	Elected as INC candidate, defected to BJP on 27 January 2025.
28	Nirmala Devi	INC	
29	Manaur	AAP	
30	Hardeep Singh	AAP	Elected as SAD candidate, defected to AAP after the election.
31	Lakhbir Singh Billu	BJP	Elected as AAP candidate, defected to BJP after the election.
32	Jasmanpreet Singh Babbar	BJP	
33	Kanwarjit Rana	BJP	
34	Gurpeet Singh	INC	
35	Rajinder Sharma	BJP	

=== Nominated councillors ===
Sr. No.	Councillor
1	Charanjiv Singh
2	Ajay Dutta
3	Sachin Kumar Lohtiya
4	Haji Mohd. Khurshid Ali
5	Dr Joytsna Wig
6	Shipra Bansal
7	Sat Parkash Aggarwal
8	Kamla Sharma
9	Maj. Gen. M. S. Kandal

== Civic utilities ==
The prime responsibilities of the civic body are to ensure cleanliness and sanitation in the city, illumination of street lights, maintenance of parks, and sewerage disposal.

=== Water Supply ===
The city has both brick and pipe sewers laid in four phases. In September 2020, the civic body announced that it would upgrade and renew the 50-year-old sewerage system. The pilot project for the 24x7 water supply is expected to begin in Chandigarh in May 2021, which was initially to start in September 2020 and end in March 2022. On 8 April 2021, Chandigarh Smart City Ltd (CSCL) opened the bid by the joint venture firm between SB Engineering and Tap Presstressed Pvt Ltd that quoted a value lower than the reserved price of ₹162 crores. The CSCL board is yet to take the final decision.
