= Narayanapur, Bidar =

Narayanapur Narayanapura
- village
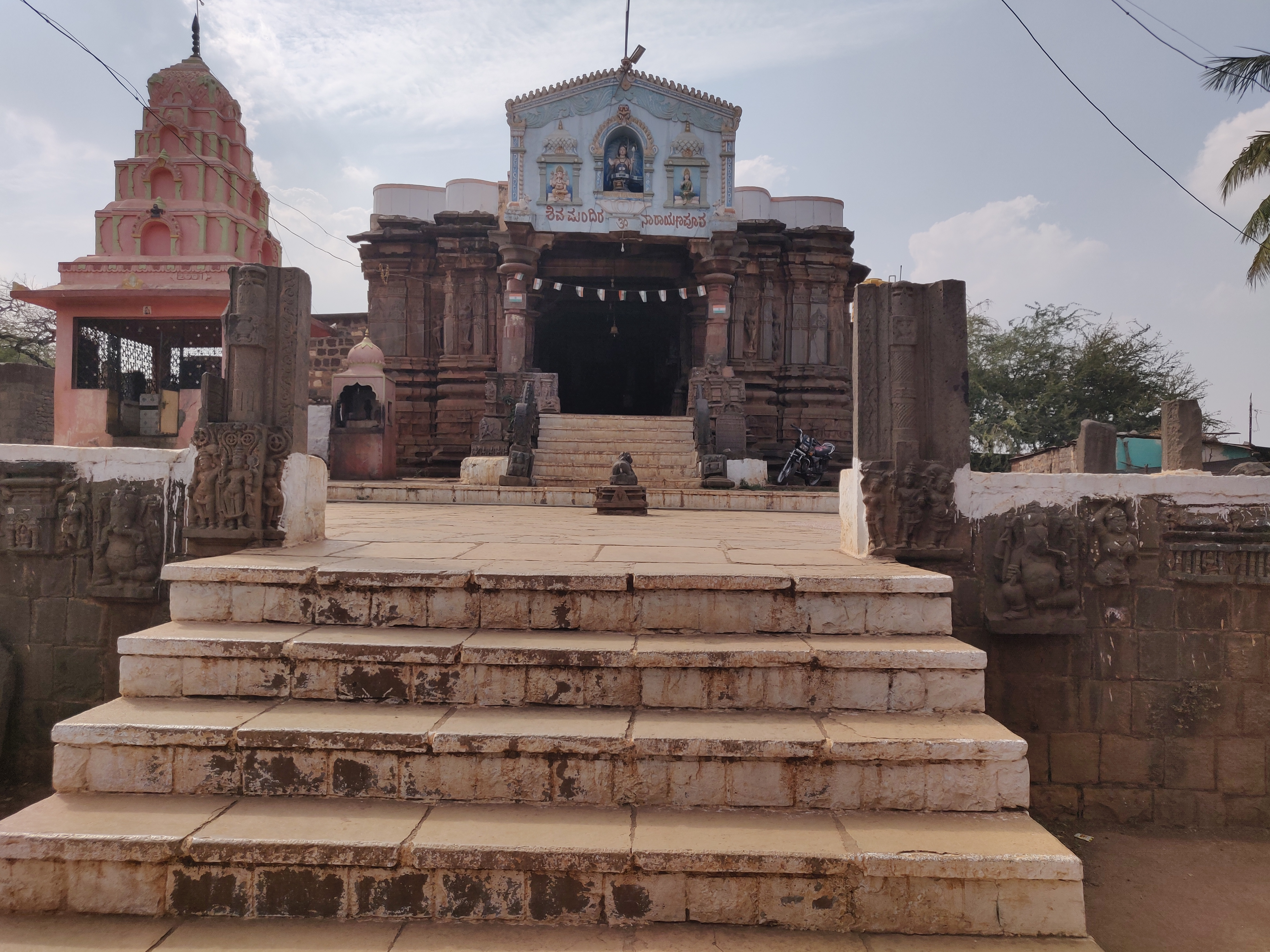
- Shiva temple, Narayanapur

- Location in Karnataka, India Narayanapur (India)
- Coordinates: 17°51′32″N 76°58′24″E
- Country: India
- State: Karnataka
- District: Bidar
- Taluk: Basavakalyan
- Lok Sabha Constituency: Bidar
- Founder: Chalukya Vikramaditya
- Nearest City: Basavakalyan

Government
  - Type: Gram
  - Body: Panchayat of Narayanapur

Area
  - Total: 35.91 km^{2} (13.86 sq mi)
  - Rank: 3rd (Basavakalyan Taluka)
- Elevation: 607 m (1,991 ft)

Population (2011)
  - Total: 9,152
  - Rank: 4th (Basavakalyan Taluka)
  - Density: 255/km^{2} (660/sq mi)
- Demonym(s): Narayanapuria, Narayanapuri, Narayanapurkar

Languages
  - Official: Kannada
- Time zone: UTC+5:30 (IST)
- Pin Code: 585327
- Vehicle registration: KA 56

Narayanapur is a village situated 3 kilometres away from Basavakalyan taluk of Bidar district in the Indian state of Karnataka.

== History ==
The village is mentioned as Tribhuvana Tilaka Shri Rama Narayanapura, Rayanarayanapura and Viranarayanapura.

== Shiva Temple ==
Narayanapur is renowned for the ancient 12th-century Shiva temple, built during the Chalukyan reign and located in the village. In addition, there are a few other temples like Bhagyavanti Temple, Lakshmi Temple, Bhavani Temple, and Hanuman Temples in Narayanpur.

== Schools in Narayanpur ==
- Jawahar Navodaya Vidyalaya (JNV) Bidar, is a government-operated senior secondary residential school located in Narayanpur, Bidar. Founded in 1988 and opened its classes in 2011, it is also part of the Navodaya Vidyalaya system administered by the Ministry of Education of the Indian Government.
- Govt Mps, Narayanpur
- Vidyaniketan P. S, Narayanpur

== Demographics ==
As of 2001 India census, Narayanapur had a population of 8677 with 4486 males and 4191 females.

== Transport ==
Narayanapur is 3 km from Taluka headquarter Basavakalyan. It is well connected by road to Basavakalyan. Nearest major railway station is in Bidar which is 83 kilo metres from village. Nearest Domestic airport is Bidar which is 83 kms, nearest international airport is Hyderabad, which is 180 kms from the village.

== See also ==
- Bhalki
- Aurad
- Humnabad
- Bidar
