= Shiva temple, Narayanapur =

Shiva temple
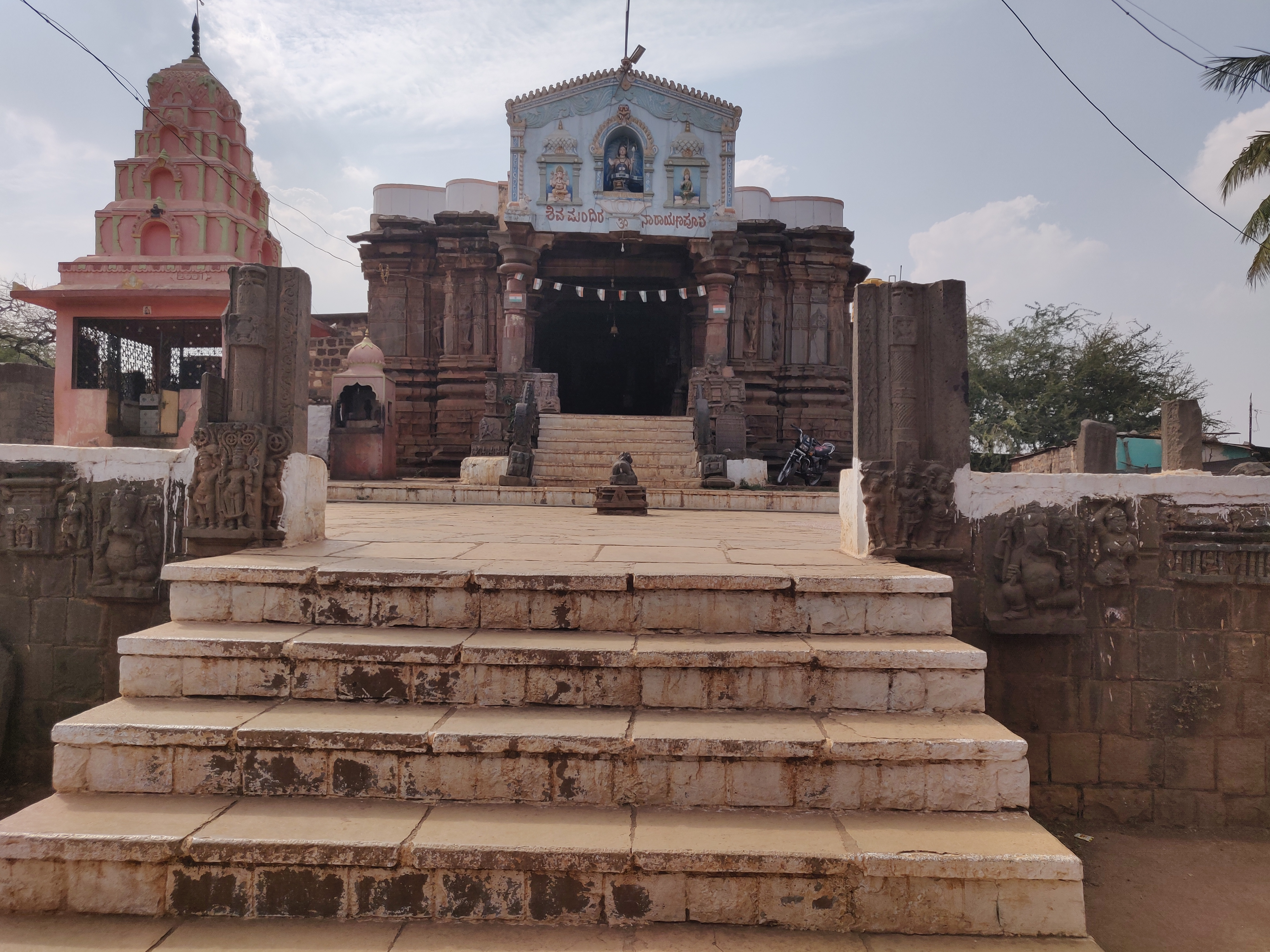
- View from the entrance

- Location in Karnataka, India

Religion
- Affiliation: Hinduism
- District: Bidar district
- Province: Karnataka
- Deity: Shiva

Location
- Location: Narayanapur, Bidar
- Country: India
- Interactive map of Shiva temple
- Coordinates: 17°51′30.05″N 76°58′28.5″E

Architecture
- Completed: 11th century

The Shiva temple in Narayanapur village in Bidar district. The temple is about 4 km from Basavakalyan town. The temple is a showcase of Kalyani Chalukyan architecture.

== Architecture ==
The temple is constructed as trikutachala i.e. containing three parts/rooms. The garbhagriha and two pillared mandapams. Many images of Narasimha slaying Hiranyakashipu, different forms of Vishnu and Lakshmi can be found in the temple. This may suggest that the temple might once been dedicated to Vishnu. The inner ceiling of the temple contains intricate floral designs. Two broken makara torana is kept on either side at the entrance of the temple. The outside wall of the temple has beautiful Salabhanjika statues around them. The inner ceilings of the temple have beautiful floral designs. Due to damaged ceiling water enters through roof of the temple. To prevent them a new roof with concrete has been constructed in recent times.

There is a well near the temple. Next to the well there is a second temple building in dilapidated condition.

== Celebrations ==
In the month of August every year there would be a grand celebration with processing of the deity around the village.

== Gallery ==
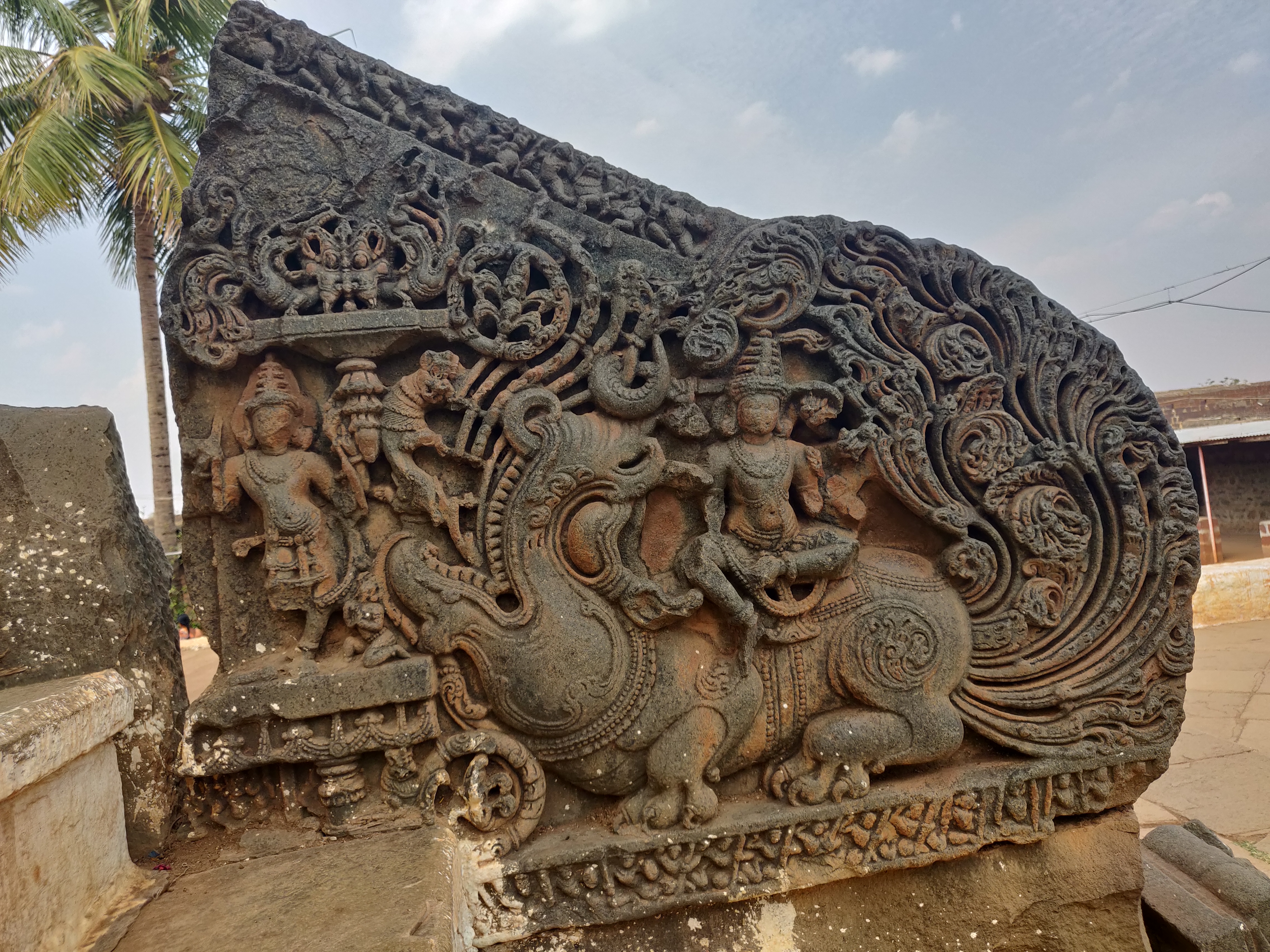
Broken Makara torana.

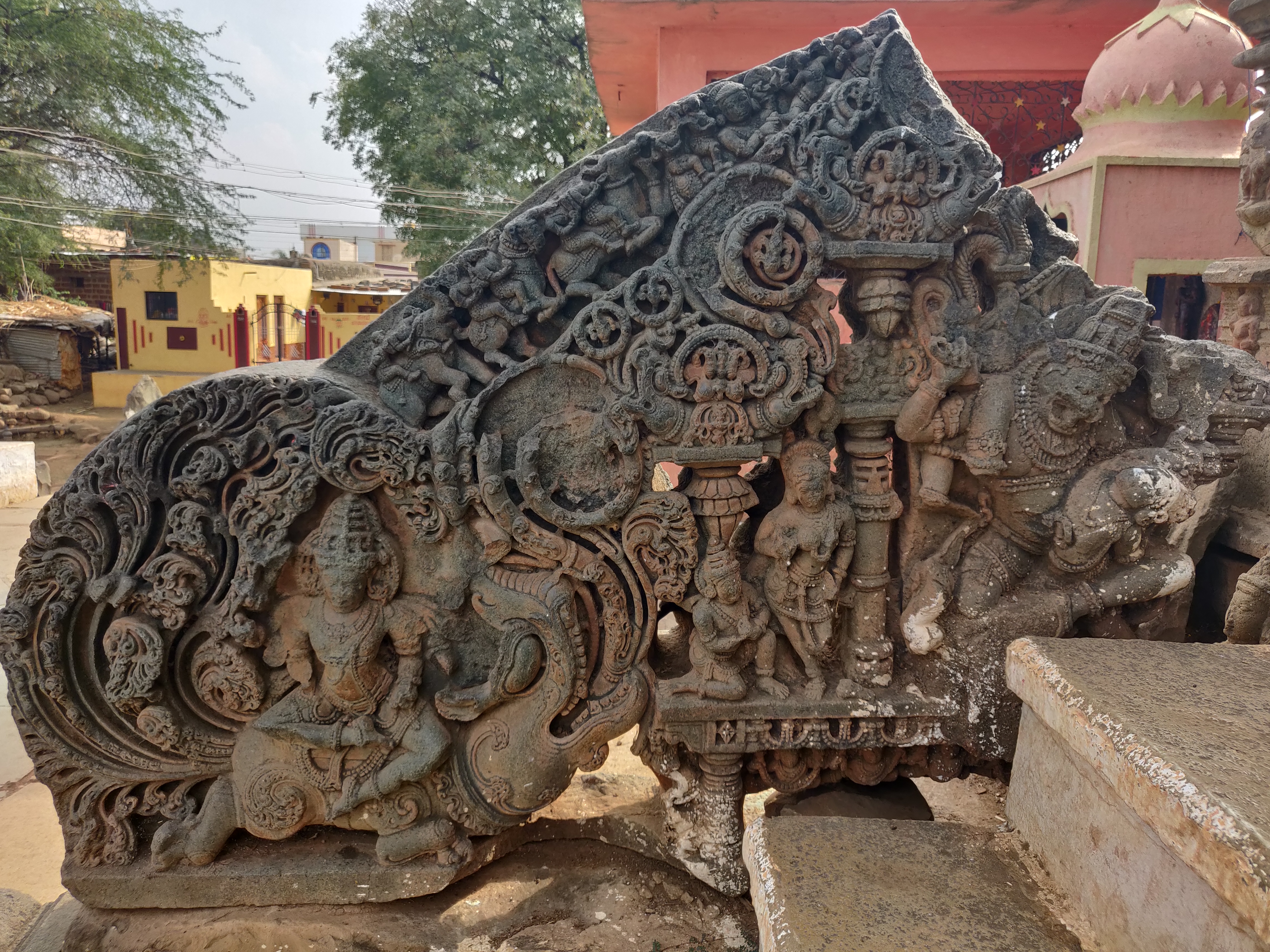
Broken Makara torana. On the right side Narasimha slays Hiranyakashipu.

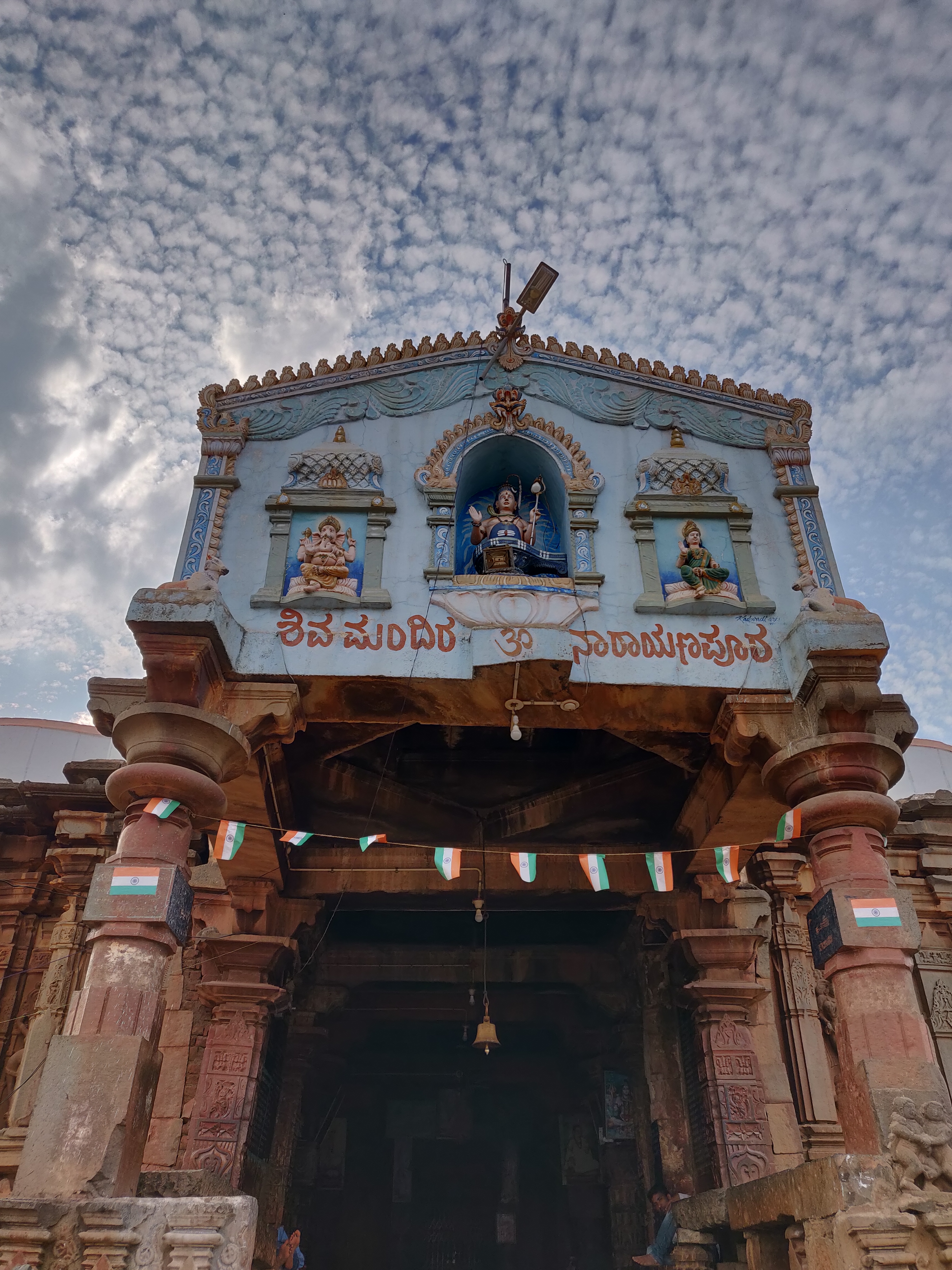
Entrance of the temple with new roof on the top.

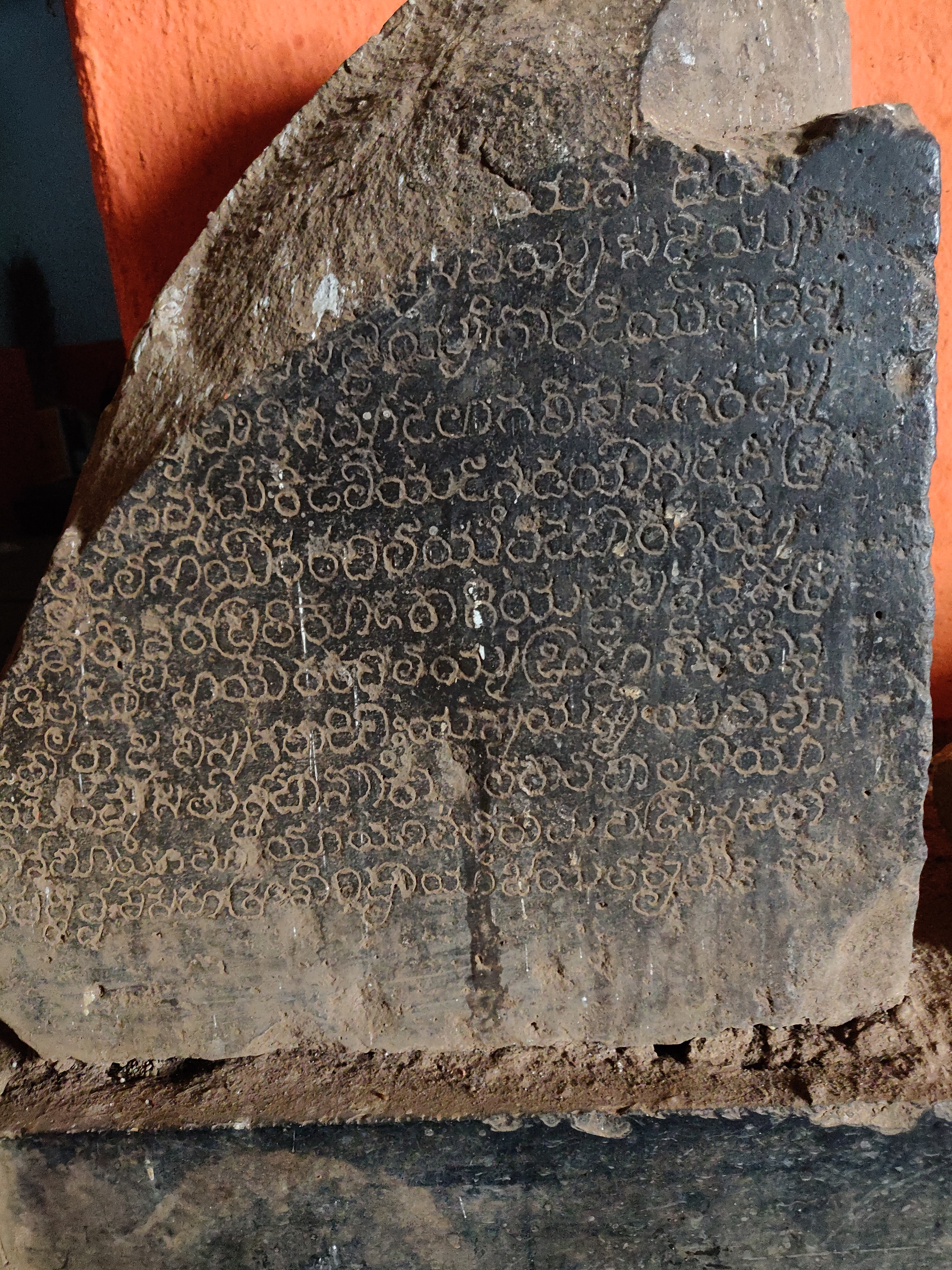
Inscriptions in the temple.

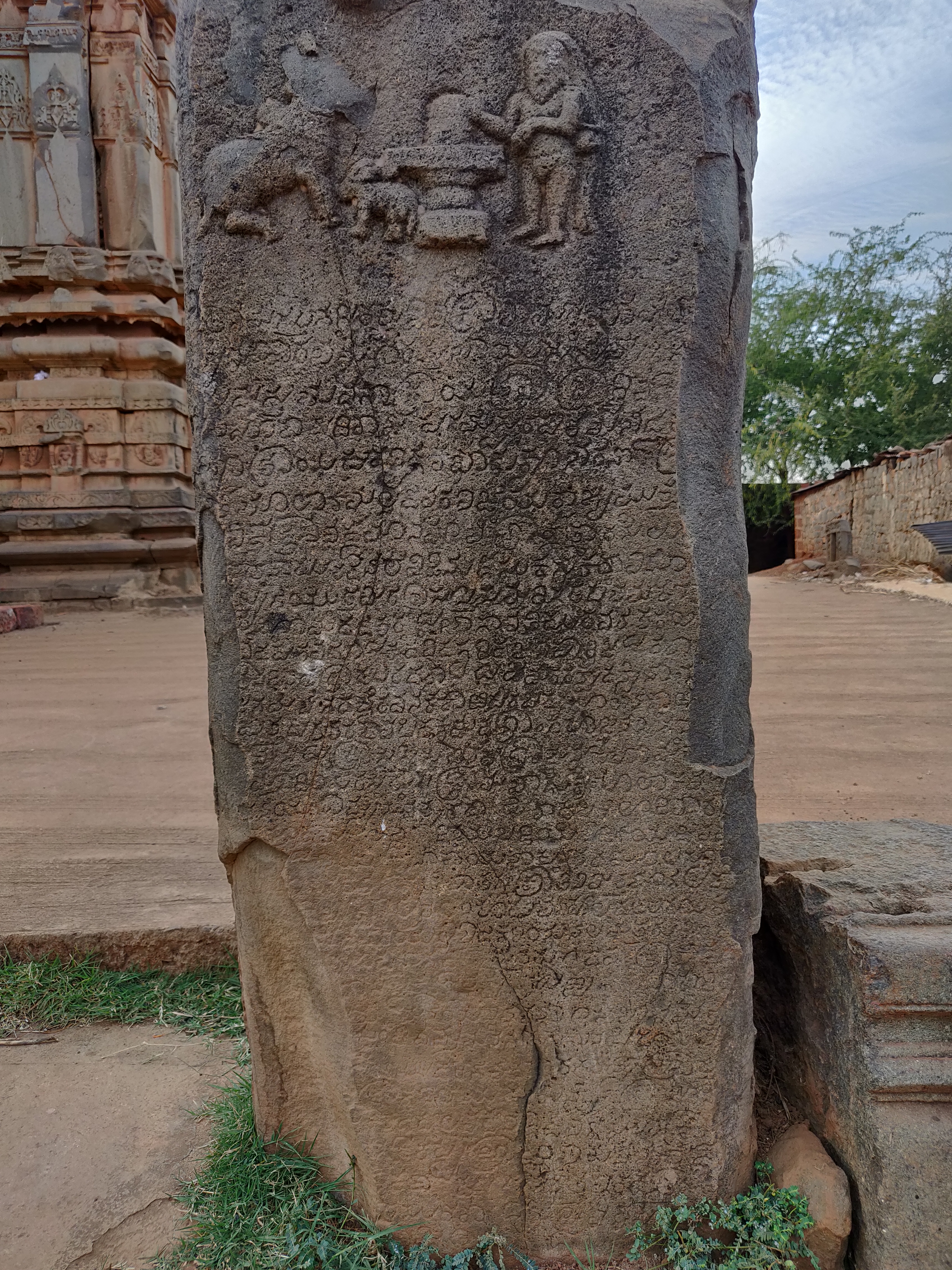
Inscription kept outside the temple.

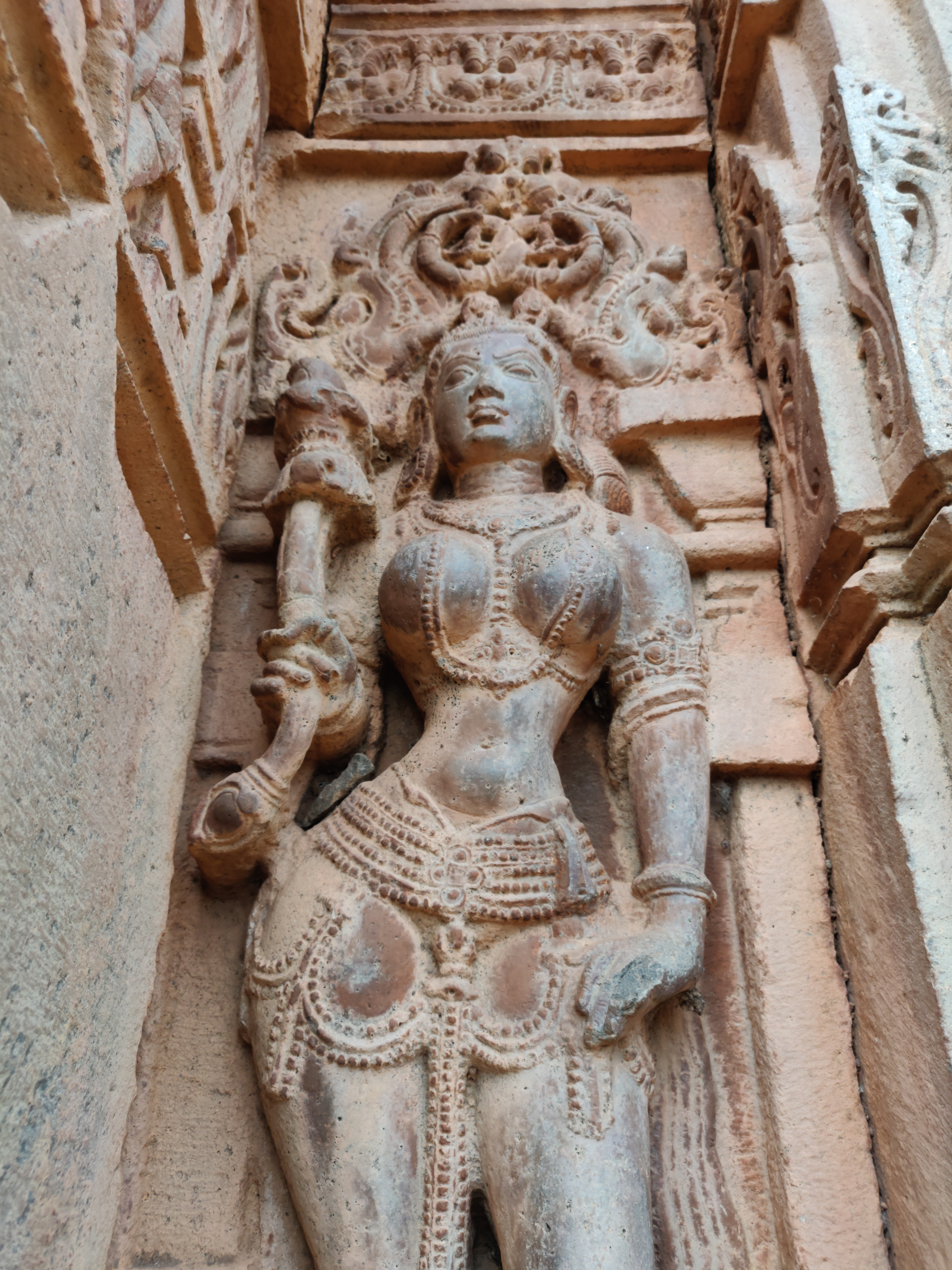
Salabhanjika style statues adoring the outside wall of the temple.

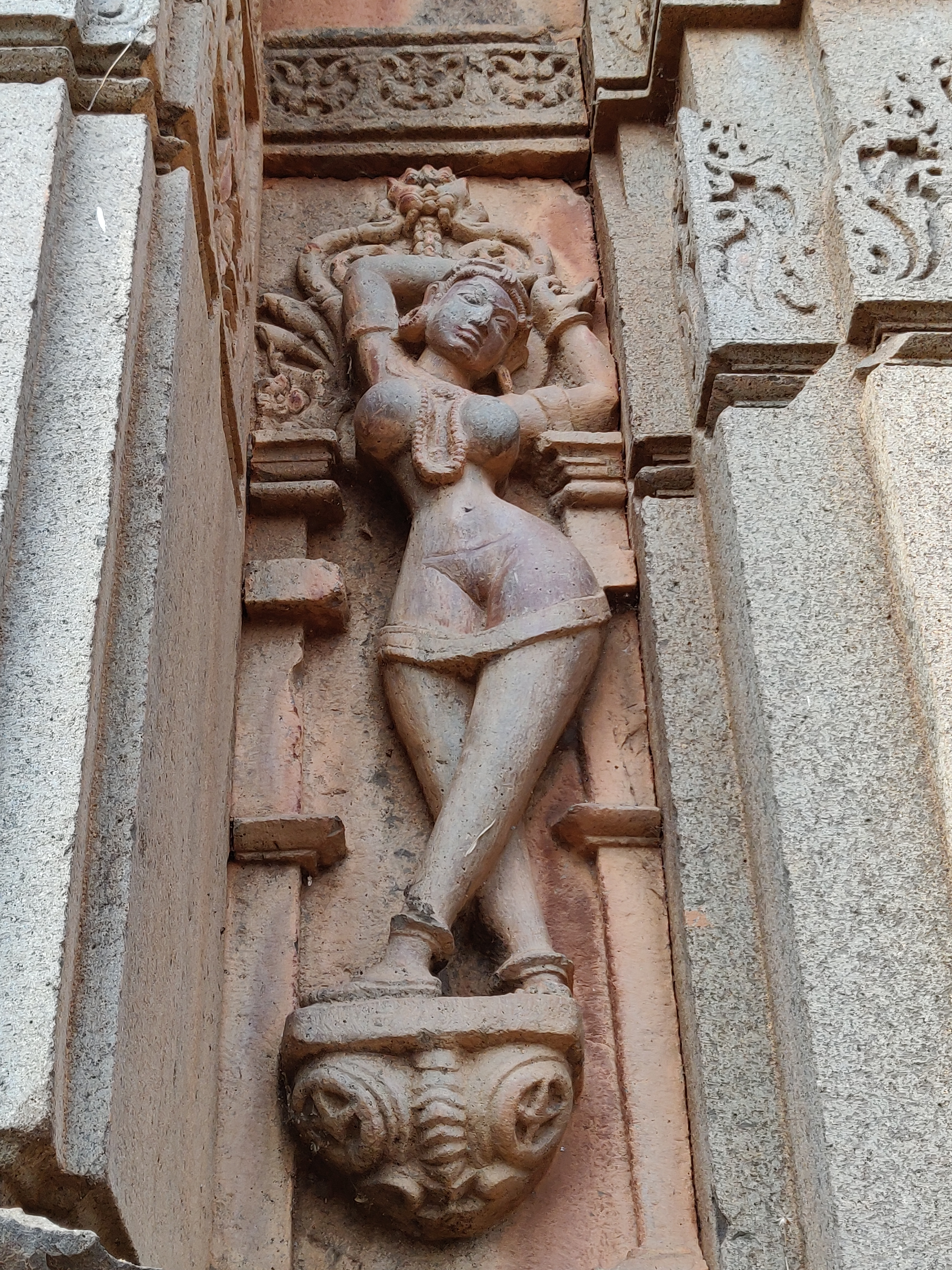
Salabhanjika style statues adoring the outside wall of the temple.

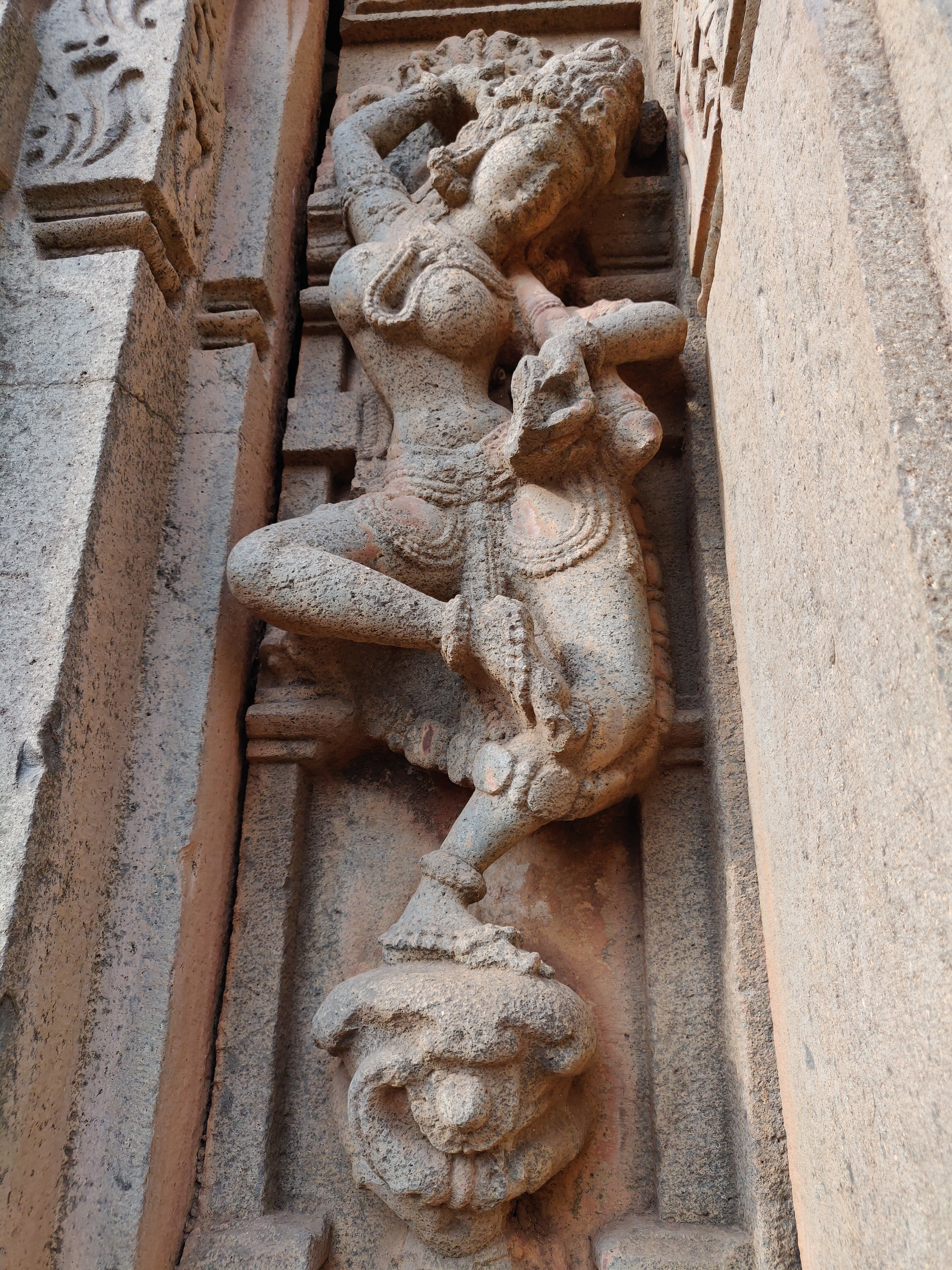
Salabhanjika style statues adoring the outside wall of the temple.

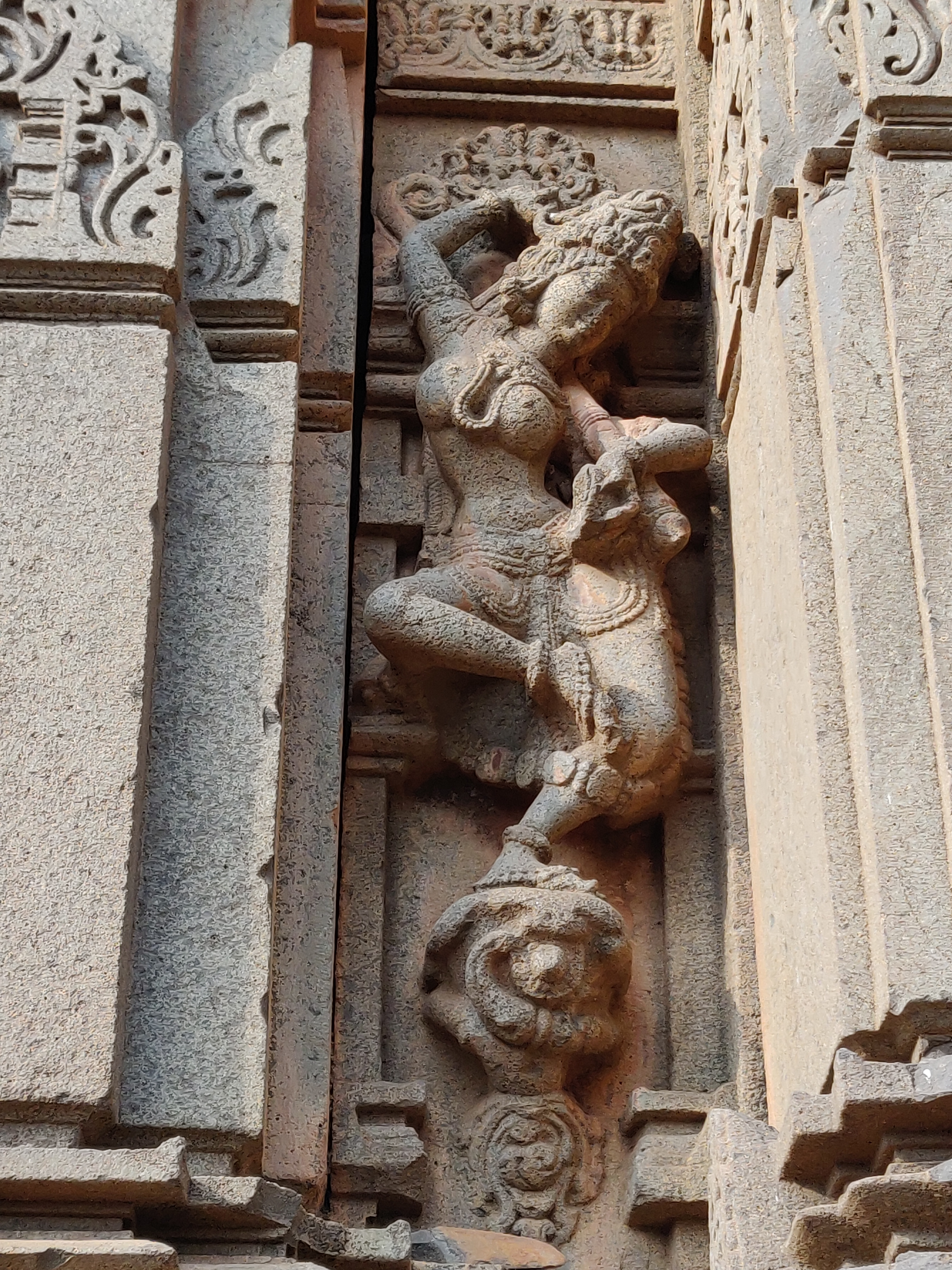
Salabhanjika style statues adoring the outside wall of the temple.

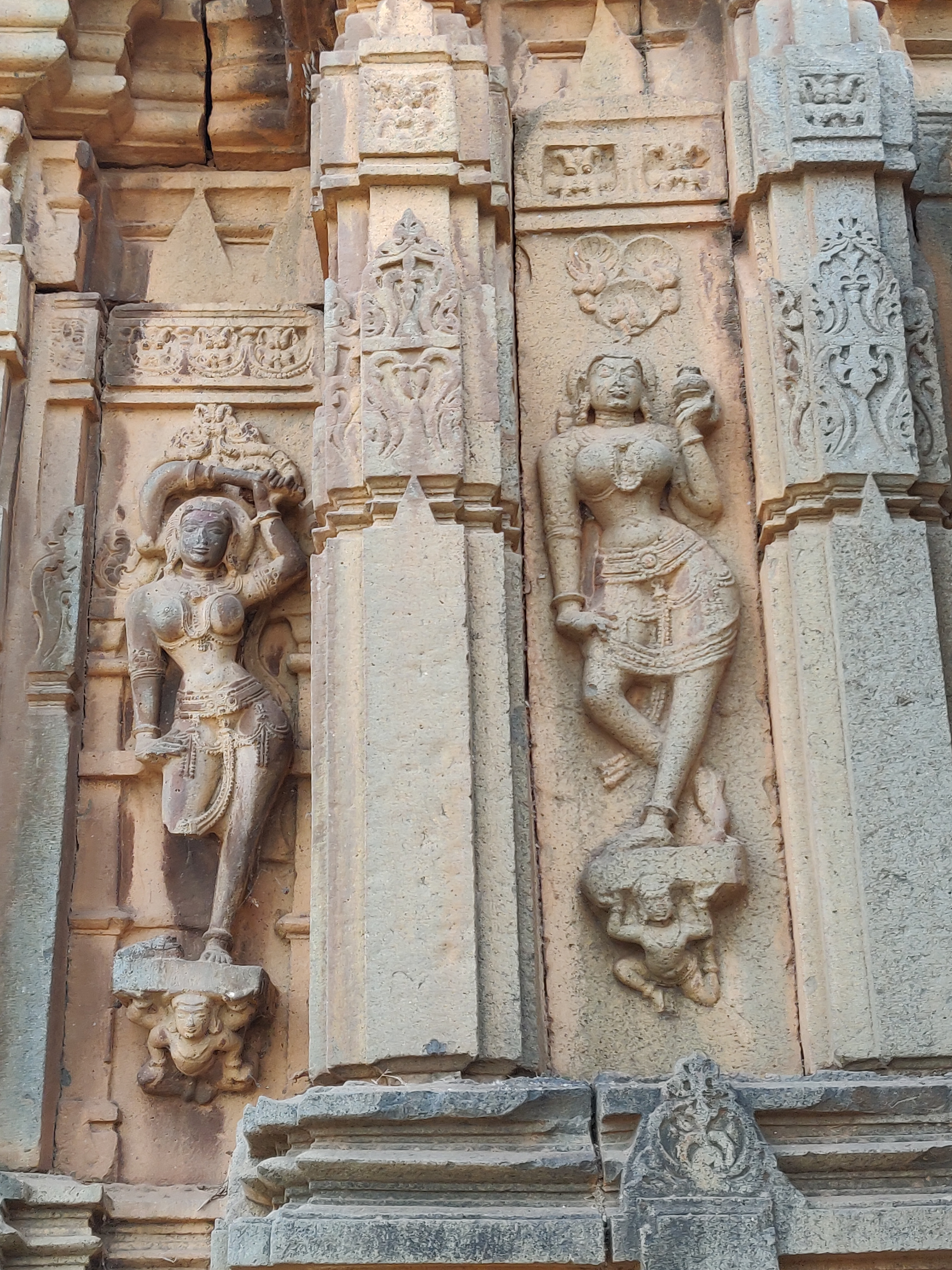
Salabhanjika style statues adoring the outside wall of the temple.

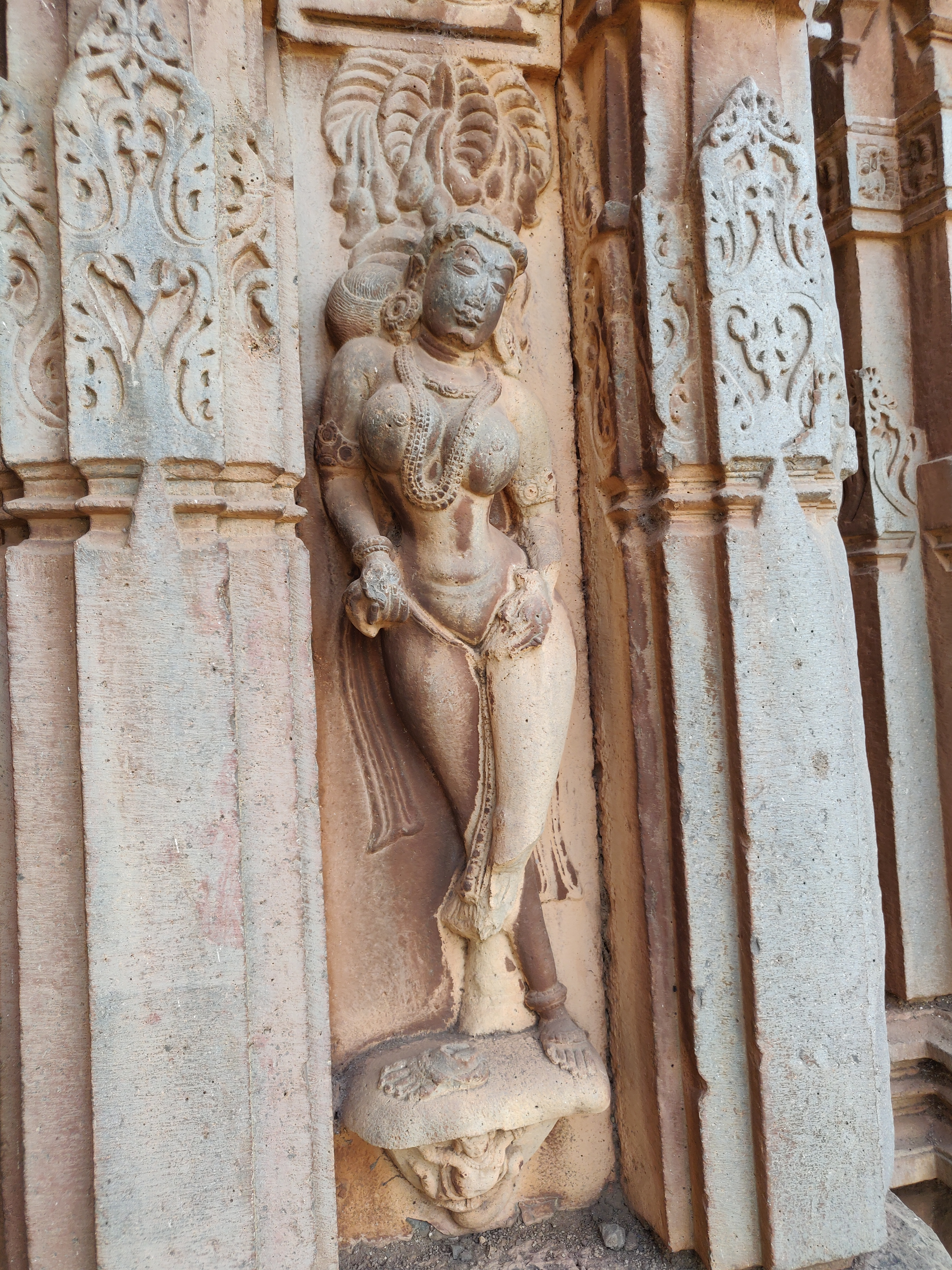
Salabhanjika style statues adoring the outside wall of the temple.
