= Saraswati Gangadhar =

16th-century Indian writer

Saraswati Gangadhar (16th century) wrote Shri GuruCharitra, a book on the life of Narasimha Saraswati who is considered to be the second avatar of Dattatreya. Nothing much is known about Gangadhar's life other than through the Shri GuruCharitra.

Guru-Charitra means "Guru's Life Story" or "Guru's Biography".

== Family background ==
Shri Gurucharitra indicates that Gangadhar belonged to the Deshastha Brahmin family of kaundinya gotra. It is not known how many children he had but he frequently mentioned his "poorvaj" (Ancestor) called Sayandev who was one of the four close disciples of Narasimha Saraswati. Gangadhar also mentions the four generations of his family that preceded him.

== Poetic work ==
Gangadhar was a gifted poet. Although his mother tongue was Kannada, the Shri Gurucharitra displays his mastery over the Marathi language. It is considered a "Ved" of Datta-Sampradaya, which is quite widespread in Maharashtra, Karnataka, Telangana and Andhra Pradesh. This Grantha is somewhat like Gita for Datta-Sampradaya adherents. Gangadhar wrote 52 chapters in which he describes the life and philosophy of Shripad ShriVallabha and Narasimha Saraswati. These are two avatars of Dattatreya. In spite of descriptions of Vedanta and other heady philosophical ideas, the Grantha is written with clarity. It is quite possible (according to experts such as R. C. Dhere) that he had the Sanskrit version of the Gurucharitra written by Narasimha Saraswati's disciple, Siddha, and he may have translated that into Prakrit language, i.e. Marathi.

== Life story ==
Little is known about Gangadhar's life and death. But it appears that he was born after Narasimha Saraswati, possibly living between 1378 - 1458. It is also not possible that he may have had contact with one of the disciples, such as Siddha. However, he may have had access to a Sanskrit Gurucharitr written by Siddha, although there is no extant copy of this original Sanskrit work. Later, in the 19th-20th century, Vasudevanand Saraswati, alias Tembe Swami, (1854-1914) wrote a Sanskrit version of Shri GuruCharitra.

He lived in the village of Kadaganchi, now located in Karnataka.
