= Kurupuram =

- Village
- Location within Karnataka Location within Telangana Location within India
- Coordinates: 16°21′30.4″N 77°32′30.6″E
- Country: India
- State: Karnataka
- State: Telangana
- State: Andhra Pradesh

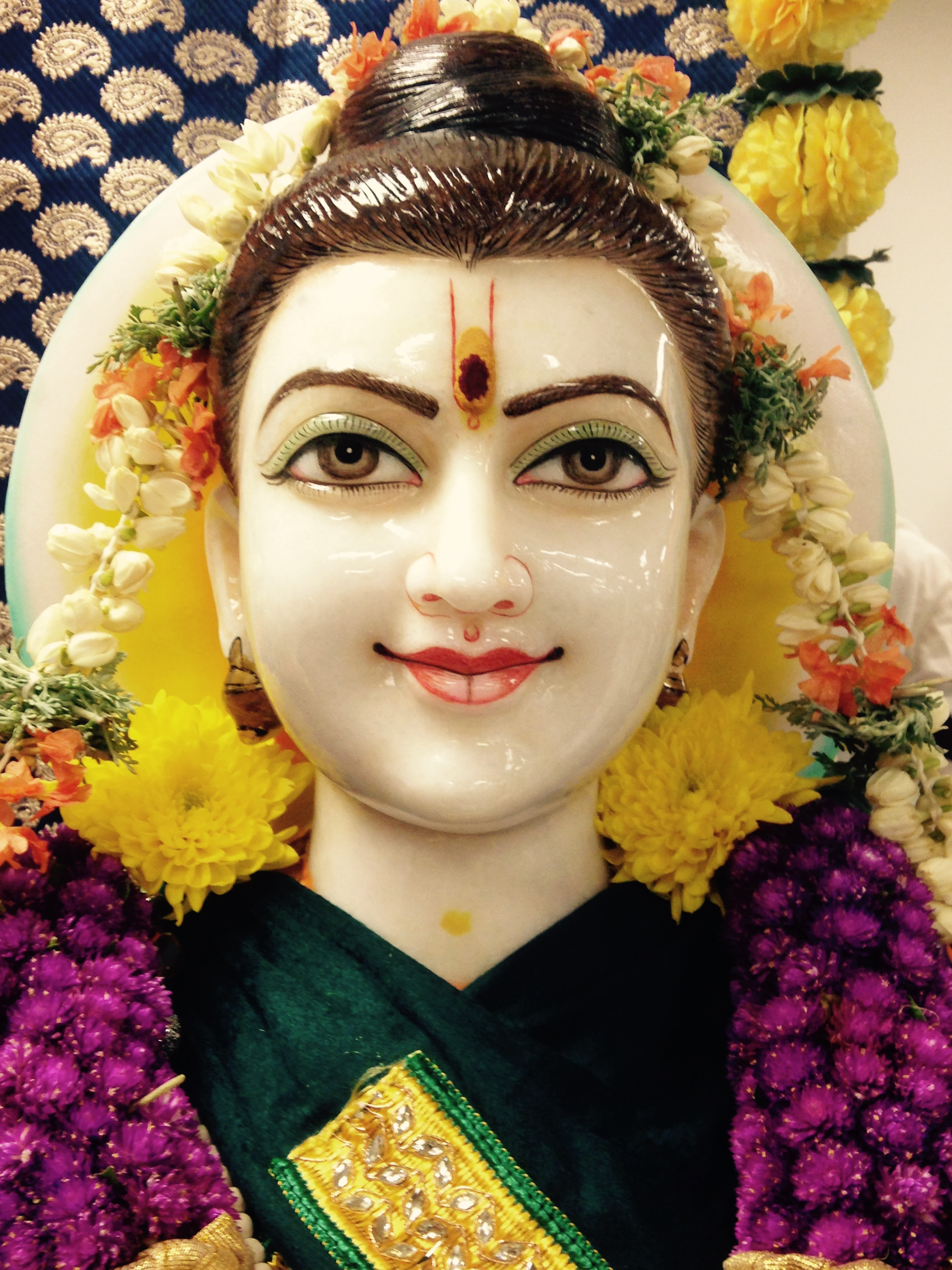
SriPada Sri Vallabha

Kurupuram, also known as Kuruvapur, Kurugadda, or Kurugaddi, is a holy place associated with Shripad Shri Vallabha who is considered as one of the first avatars (incarnations) of the deity Shri Dattatreya in Kali Yuga. This village is located on the banks of the Krishna River in border of Telangana and Karnataka states, India. On the opposite bank of the river is Vallabhapuram belonging to the state of Telangana, which is also sacred.

== Religious importance ==
Shripad Vallabha stayed here most of his life. The religious significance of Kurupuram is duly mentioned in the book Shri Guru Charitra and other holy books associated with Shri Dattatreya. Shripad Vallabha did many leelas here. According to Gurucharitra, the people who visit Kurupuram become free from all the problems and are blessed with a healthy and prosperous life.
