= Nana Maharaj Taranekar =

Hindu figure (1896–1993)

Nana Maharaj Taranekar (Chaitanyananda Saraswati)
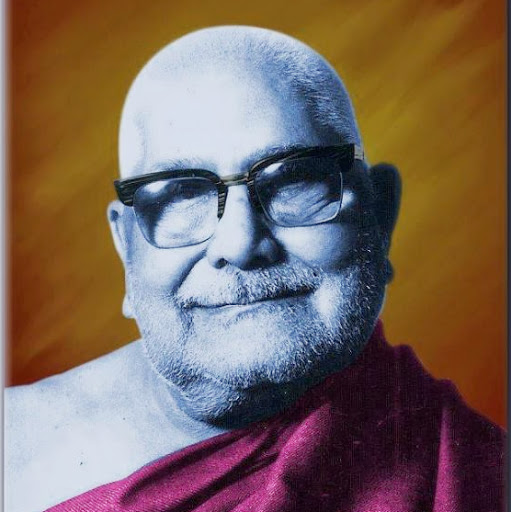
- Taranekar in 2014

Personal life
- Born: Martand Shankar Taranekar; 13 August 1896 Tarana, India
- Died: 16 April 1993 (aged 96) Nagpur, India

Religious life
- Religion: Hinduism
- Sect: Datta Sampradaya

Religious career
- Teacher: Vasudevanand Saraswati
- Disciples: Vahinisaheb Taranekar; Aagashe Kaka Maharaj; Baba Maharaj Taranekar; Janardan Swami Kher Maharaj; Dhanagare Maharaj; Aanandyogeshwar Nilkanth Maharaj

Shri Nana Maharaj Taranekar (born Martand Shankar Taranekar; 13 August 1896 – 16 April 1993) is considered to be a prominent saint within the Datta Sampradaya sect of Hinduism during the twentieth century (in the Gurucharita tradition of Dattatreya). He is regarded as the sixteenth incarnation of lord Dattatreya. Shri Nana was the direct disciple of Shri Vasudevanand Saraswati Swami Maharaj (also known as Tembe Swami).

== Early life ==
Shri Nana Maharaj was born on 13 August 1896 in the village of Tarana (District-Ujjain, Madhya Pradesh). His father was Shri Shankar Shastry and his mother Lakshmi Bai. He had an inclination towards devotion and Namasmaran (chanting of the holy name of God) since his childhood. Nana received a blessing from his Guru Shri Vasudevanand Saraswati Swami Maharaj at age 11. He served as a priest of Datta Mandir Tarana (District-Ujjain, Madhya Pradesh) and after his father's death, he became the Dharmadhikari (Hindu religious leader) for the town of Tarana. Nana conducted many Yajna rituals such as Vishnu Yag, Datta Yag, and Ganesh Yag. He spent his whole life preaching and extolling the importance of Namasmaran.

== Work ==
Nana Maharaj was well known as great saint in Maharashtra, Madhya Pradesh, and Gujarat. He guided his devotees in the advancement of their spiritual as well as material lives. He was the founder of Akhil Bhartiya Tripadi Parivar, which is seen as his group of followers.

== Sayings ==
- Be disciplined, train, and gain control over your six senses.
- To see and feel your Sadguru in everything is Yoga.
- Good things are acquired through seeing, reading, or listening; you should accept and learn from every source you can.
- Where I am remembered, there shall I be.

== Prominent places of residence ==
=== Indore, Madhya Pradesh ===
This is the karma bhoomi of Nana Maharaj. Devotees gather every year at Pa.Pu. Nana Maharaj Taranekar Sansthan, Indore, on the occasion of Nana Maharaj Punyatithi (Chaitra Krishna 10), Guru Poornima, Nana Maharaj Jayanti (Nagpanchami, Shravan Shukla 5), and Dattatreya Jayanti.

=== Nagpur, Maharashtra ===
Maharaj died at Chaitanya Peeth, Nagpur on 16 April 1993. This is the Mahanirvan place of Pa.Pu. Satguru Shri Nana Maharaj Taranekar.
