= Amarja =

Amarja River
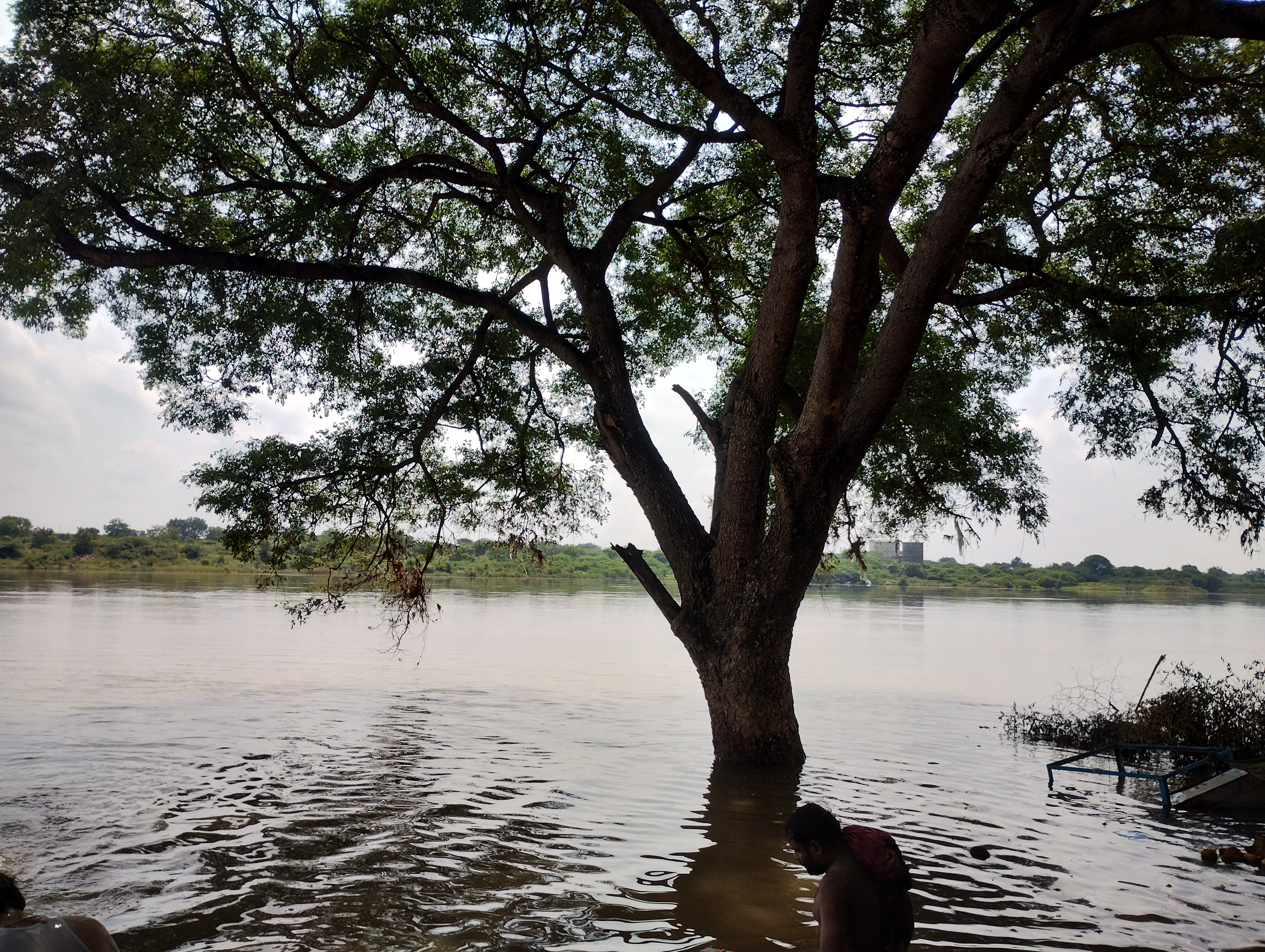

The Amarja is a river that flows in Kalaburagi District, Karnataka, India. It is born at Koralli and flows up to 50–60 kilometres and will merge into the Bhima River at Sangama Kshetra Ganagapura village in Gulbarga District. Sangam Kshetra is a meeting (Sangama) point of the Bhima and Amarja rivers. The water of these rivers, especially at their confluence, called Sangam, are considered extremely holy. Those who bathe in Sangam will be freed from their sins, and their wishes will be fulfilled. There is a temple in Sangam in which Shree Narasimha Saraswati Swamy (The second incarnation of Lord Dattatreya) regularly bathed.
