= Balekundri =

Balekundri may refer to:

- Balekundri (B.K.), a village in Karnataka, India
- Balekundri (K.H.), a village in Karnataka, India
- S. G. Balekundri (born 1922), irrigation expert from Karnataka
- Panth Maharaj of Balekundri, a Hindu yogi and saint from the village of Balekundri (1855-1905)
