= Vasudevanand Saraswati =

Hindu saint

Shrimad Vasudevanand Saraswati Tembe Swami Maharaj
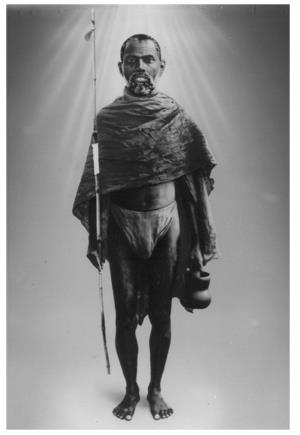

Personal life
- Born: Vasudev Ganesh Tembe; 13 August 1854 Mangaon, Sindhudurg, Maharashtra, India
- Died: 24 June 1914 Garudeshwar, Narmada, Gujarat, India
- Notable work(s): Dwisahastri Gurucharitra, Datta Puran, Datta Mahatmya, Saptashati Gurucharitra Saar

Religious life
- Religion: Hinduism
- Sect: Datta Sampradaya

Religious career
- Disciples: Rang Avadhoot, Ganda Maharaj (Yogananda Saraswati), Vamanrao Gulavani Maharaj, Dikshit Swami Maharaj, Nana Maharaj Taranekar (Chaitanyananda Saraswati), Sitaram Maharaj Tembe, Raghunath Kanade ie Dada maharaj Kanade staying at Khopoli

Vasudevanand Saraswati (1854 –1914), also known as Tembe Swami, is a Hindu saint who is regarded as an incarnation of Dattatreya.

== Early life ==
His parents were devotees of Dattatreya, his father Ganesh Bhatt Tembe spending years together in the remote Ganagapur temple of the Lord in Karnataka. His mother Ramabai also spent her time in religious pursuits like japa (recitation of mantras), pradakshina, path, atithisatkar (hospitality) etc. After a twelve-year stay in Ganagapur, Dattatreya appeared in a dream and instructed Ganesh Bhatt to return to Mangaon and lead the life of a householder, promising to incarnate as his son. It was after his return from Ganagapur that his eldest son Vasudev was born on Shravan Vadya 5, Shalivahan Shaka 1776, 26 ghatika after sunrise (4 - 4.30 a.m.) at Mangaon, near Sawantvadi, Maharashtra to this Karhade Brahmin family.

At the age of three years, Vasudev started attending the private school held in the Yakshini temple in the village. He had to learn writing with his fingers on a layer of dust, a very tiring and painful practice. Apart from the secular education in the school, Vasudev also received traditional oral education from his grandfather Hari Bhatt Tembe. With his sharp intellect and quick memory, Vasudev soon mastered the basics of Sanskrit grammar and poetry.

In 1875, at the age of 21 years, he was married to Bayo - later renamed Annapurnabai- the daughter of Babajipant Gode from Ranjangad.

He established Datta Mandir in Mangaon in 1883. The construction of the sanctum was carried out with his own hands. The Datta idol in the temple was given to him by a sculptor at Kagal, who said that Dattatreya had appeared in his dreams and ordered him to make the idol for Maharaj as per his specifications.

He was an expert Sanskrit scholar right from his childhood. He travelled across the country for 23 years, strictly following the harsh discipline of the Sanyas Ashram. All people had equal access to him. There was no discrimination in spite of his personal strict code of purity. People of all castes were the recipients of his grace and he was very sensitive and listened sympathetically to their sorrows and grievances and provided counsel which, if followed, would remove or relieve their sufferings.

He has authored around 19 books like Dwisahastri Gurucharitra (1889), Datta Puran (1892), Datta Mahatmya (1901), Saptashati Gurucharitra Saar (1904) and many more.

The holy book Shri GuruCharitra was not supposed to be read by women according to Maharaj. Hence, for women to gain knowledge of the book, he wrote The Saptashati Gurucharitra Saar, a short version of the Gurucharitra.

He took sanyas thirteen days after his wife's death in 1891, at the banks of the River Godavari, when a Sanyasi appeared from across the river and administered the vows of sanyas. Later, he was given the 'dand' (monastic sceptre) by Narayanand Saraswati at Ujjaini.

== Contact with other great saints ==
=== Gajanan Maharaj, Shegaon ===
In 1905, during his sojourn through Vidarbha, Swami Maharaj visited Shegaon. On the previous day, Shri. Gajanan Maharaj instructed his devotees: "My learned brother, a Karhada Brahmin is coming to visit. He is a strict puritan. Don’t let any bits of cloth strew his path!". When Swami Maharaj arrived, Gajanan Maharaj was snapping his fingers absent mindedly. On seeing Swami Maharaj, the snapping suddenly stopped and the two saints started staring at each other with joyous faces. There was hardly any verbal communication. They just seemed to enjoy each other's company. After some time, Swami Maharaj left the place. Gajanan Maharaj just said: "Very nice!".

After Maharaj left, the devotee and host of Gajanan Maharaj, Bala Bhau wondered how a strict Brahmin Sanyasi could be a brother to a personage with no restrictions like Gajanan Maharaj. Gajanan Maharaj told him that the differences are only apparent and in essence, they were one, having merged with the universal being beyond all names and forms.

=== Swami Samarth, Akkalkot ===
Swami Samarth, who is also regarded as an incarnation of Dattatreya, also interacted with Maharaj. In 1905, once on his way to Pandharpur from Narsobawadi, at a place called Kamalapur, a tall man with hands extending to the knees appeared to Swami Maharaj in his dream and asked him, "You travel all over and also compose poetry. How come you pay no attention to me?". On waking up, Swami Maharaj enquired with the Lord about the personage. The Lord answered, "He is the Swami of Akkalkot and he wants you to visit Akkalkot and write his life in verse." Swami Maharaj said, "This tongue is dedicated to the feet of Dattatreya. If you command and the (relevant) information is made available, it can be composed". The Lord instructed Maharaj to visit Akkalkot on the way to Pandharpur.

=== Sai Baba, Shirdi ===
Sai Baba of Shirdi was a contemporary saint, also considered an incarnation of Dattatreya by his devotees. A major disciple of Sai Baba, Pundalika Rao, who hailed from Nanded Maharashtra during the Nizam period went to meet Swami Maharaj. Swamiji at that time was residing at Rajamahendri in Andhra Pradesh. After offering a keertan (devotional song singing) service in the presence of Swami Maharaj, the Swami Maharaj asked Pundalika Rao about his plans. Pundalika Rao told Maharaj that he was on his way to Shirdi to see his guru Sai Baba. Swami Maharaj gave a coconut to Pundalika Rao saying, "Please give this to my brother". Pundalika Rao accepted the coconut and left for Shirdi, with his group of people.

On the way, one morning, the group halted at Kopargaon station, where Pundalika Rao went away to perform the daily religious services. His companions, feeling hungry, proceeded to eat some snacks they had packed. It turned out the snacks were rather too spicy and hot. Everyone was thirsting for water, which, on that hot summer day was not readily available. Some resourceful members decided to break the coconuts in the baggage to satiate their thirst. Among these coconuts, the one from Swami Maharaj was also broken and consumed. The snacks and the coconut were offered to Pundalika Rao too on his return. When they reached Shirdi, Pundalika Rao was dismayed by the cold reception he got from Sai Baba, who turned his back on the group and shouted abuses "thieves and scoundrels!" at them. This was markedly in contrast to the loving reception Pundalika Rao almost always got from Baba. He was stricken with remorse and threw himself at the feet of Baba begging forgiveness. Baba shouted at him, "Where is the coconut my brother gave me? Get me my coconut first!" Pundalika Rao, unaware of its disposal, asked his companions for it. It was only when they confessed to having eaten it that he realised the sacrilege. Having impressed upon Pundalika Rao and others of the esteem he had for his "brother's" coconut, Sai Baba gave up his feigned anger and rebuked them for the sacrilege.

Thus, though the two saints never met each other in person, they have, through this episode, made evident, their innate spiritual unity. Outwardly Swami Maharaj was a highly orthodox Brahmanical monk and Sai Baba was a most unorthodox mendicant refusing to conform to any religious tradition. But for this incident, most observers would feel that they represented two opposing doctrines. However a close examination of their life and teachings would reveal that their differences were more in form than in essence. Both these saints were motivated by an intense desire to mitigate the sufferings of all persons coming into their contact, irrespective of his caste, creed or persuasion.

Sringeri Shankaracharya

When Tembe Swami came to know that Shankaracharya of Sringeri Peetham, Shri Sachchidananda Shivabhinava Narasimha Bharati, stayed at Srirangam, he met him and composed hymns in praise of Sharadamba and Adi Sankaracharya. Shankaracharya of Shringeri Peetham told his disciples, "You people have not recognized the great master who has arrived today. He is Lord Dattatreya himself incarnate. His work of reviving Sanatana Dharma is comparable to that of Adi Sankaracharya."

Along with these widely popular figures, divine beings like the goddesses of River Narmada, River Nirmala(Mangaon), River Krishna, Nar and Narayan Muni (Badri Narayan), Ashvatthama (one of the seven immortals) have interacted with Maharaj. Other saints like Rajarajeshvar Swami, Gulabrao Maharaj(Vidarbha), Shantashram Swami(Varanasi), Deo Mamledar (Nasik) also held Maharaj in high regard. Tembe swami had a high regard for Sadasiva Brahmendra and visited his Samadhi in 1907 at Nerur. He kept a copy of Brahmendra's books - Brahma Sutra Vritti and Yoga Sutra Vritti with him always. He wrote a sloka on him.

== Final Message ==
In the morning of the day of his scheduled departure, after the daily discourse, Maharaj addressed the assembly as follows:

Today I wish to convey to you the essence of all that I have been preaching all my life through my discourses and writings. The primary objective of human life is to obtain liberation (from the recurring cycles of birth and death). To this end, one should carry out one's religious obligations as ordained by the scriptures, consistent with his Varna and Ashram. This will lead to the steadiness of mind so essential for the next step viz. study (Shravan), contemplation (Manan) and meditation (Nididhyasan) of Vedanta (conclusion of Vedas). Emphasis should be on the study i.e. the listening to discourses by detached and realized persons. This will diminish the temptation of mind. (The resultant) righteous (Sattvic) tendency is alone conductive to the spiritual ascent of man.

To cultivate Sattvic nature, diet has to be wholesome (Hit), measured (Mit) and pure (Medhya). The signs of Sattvic nature are:

- Firm faith in one's religion,
- Meticulous observance of religious conducts namely:

1. Snaan (bath)
2. Sandhya (prayer)
3. Dev Puja (worship)
4. Five major Yadnyas (sacrifices)
5. Atithti Satkar (honor to the guest)
6. Service to Gomata (Cow)
7. Sincere attendance of Katha, Keertan, Bhajans, Puran, etc.
8. Soft and kind speech
9. Refraining from harming anyone in any way
10. Service and obedience to parents (for men), and to husband, in-laws (for women) and other elders

One may pursue any means for livelihood viz. business, agriculture or service. However, one should never abandon the conduct ordained by Vedas and obedience to the Guru. Observance of one's religious duties only purifies mind. Only purified mind gets established in Upasana (progress towards God), which in turn is the only source of peace of mind. Only a peaceful mind is capable of self-knowledge which is the sole means of liberation.”

Maharaj further exemplified the seven grounds (levels) of knowledge and concluded that,
"This is a brief summary. One who follows this advice will finally attain complete happiness."

== Samadhi ==
Maharaj was originally scheduled to depart on the dark 8th of Jyeshtha month; however he did not prefer to go that day. Hence, noting the exact timing of the Tithi, Maharaj made someone sit him up and went into Samadhi for three hours. On waking up from Samadhi he said, "Today’s scheduled departure has been avoided." By the dark moon (Amavasya) of Jyeshtha, he was very weak in acute pain. He called Appa Shastri Jere from Narsoba Wadi and whispered in his ears, "I have been a subject of black magic in my householder days; however I have no desire to retaliate." Even on that last day, he tried to perform nityakarma(daily rituals), but he could not even hold water in his hand and gave up the effort saying, "God’s will".

"Once today’s Amavasya ends, this body has to be quit" he said. Accordingly, as soon as the Amavasya gave way to bright Pratipada of Ashadh, Maharaj sat up facing the Lord to the west, performed Tratak (steady gaze), controlled breath and quit the body with a loud chant of "Om". The day was Tuesday, Nakshatra Ardra, Ashadh Shuddha Pratipada.

His body was immersed into the Narmada River. His samadhi(tomb) has been built on the river bank at Garudeshwar, Gujarat. There is a famous Datta Mandir in the same place.

== Prominent places of stay ==
=== Mangaon ===
This is the birthplace of Maharaj. After his stay at Narsobawadi, Maharaj returned to Mangaon, on the instruction of the Lord, and stayed here for 7 years. He also built a Datta temple, laying the bricks with his own hands. The idol for the temple was given to him by a sculptor at Kagal, who said that he was instructed by Dattatreya in a dream to make an idol on the specifications that will be given by Maharaj. The idol was taken away by Maharaj when he left Mangaon. However, the Datta temple still exists, and is well maintained by Datta Mandir Mangaon Trust. In 1961, preserving the original elements, the temple was rebuilt (underwent a Jirnoddhar) by the Queen of Indore Indira Holkar, who was also a devotee of Maharaj. It has a 'Bhakta Nivas' (residence for devotees) where devotees can stay for a short period of time. Afternoon and night Mahaprasad meals are provided to all at a nominal cost. The house in which Maharaj was born has now been made into a Janmasthan (place of birth) where an idol of Maharaj in standing position has been placed. The village goddess Yakshini's temple is situated just besides the Janmasthan.

=== Narsobawadi ===
Maharaj stayed here for 12 years. It gets its name due to the presence of the second Purna (complete) avatar of Dattatreya, Narasimha Saraswati. The room where Maharaj stayed is situated close to the famous Datta temple which has the padukas of Dattatreya.

== See also ==
- Narsobawadi
