= Rang Avadhoot =

Indian saint and poet (1898–1968)

Personal life
- Born: Pandurang Vitthalapant Valame; 21 November 1898 Godhra, British India
- Died: 19 November 1968 (aged 69) Haridwar, India
- Notable work(s): Datta Bavani, Shree Gurulilamrut, Avadhooti Ananad Bhajan, Rang Hyadayam, Vashudevnamsudha, Dattnam Smaran, Dattnam Sankirtan, Girvanbhasha Pravesh

Religious life
- Religion: Hinduism
- Order: Gurucharita tradition
- Sect: Datta Sampradaya

Religious career
- Teacher: Vasudevanand Saraswati

Rang Avadhoot, born Pandurang Vitthalapant Valame, (21 November 1898 – 19 November 1968) was a mystic saint-poet belonging to Datta-panth (Gurucharita tradition of Dattatreya) of Hinduism. He was a social worker and independence activist before accepting asceticism. He is credited with the expansion of Datta-panth in Gujarat state of India. He has written more than 45 works, mostly concerning spirituality and devotion.

== Early life ==
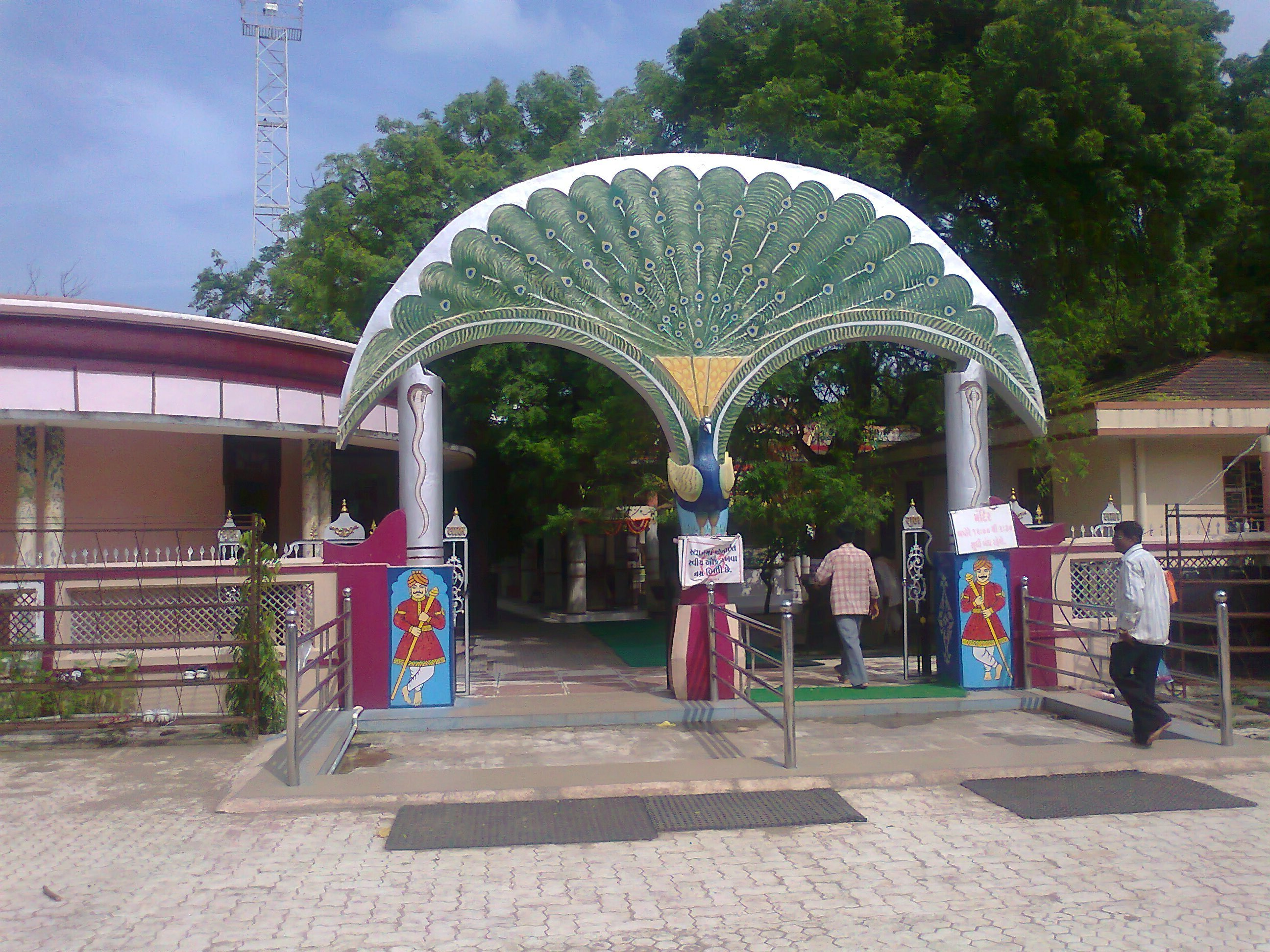
Rang Avadhoot Ashram, Nareshwar

Rang Avadhoot was born Pandurang Vitthalapant Valame on 21 November 1898 (Kartika Sud 9 according to Hindu calendar) in Godhra in a Marathi family of Vitthalpant Jairam Valame and Rukmini (née Kashi). His family belonged to Devle village (now in Sangameshwar taluka of Ratnagiri district in Maharashtra). His father moved to Godhra as a caretaker (pujari) of Viththal temple. His father died in a plague in 1902. He had a brother named Narayan. He met his spiritual teacher (guru) Vasudevanand Saraswati (Tembe Swami) in 1905.

He was religiously inclined since his childhood. He received his school education in Godhra and matriculated in 1917 from Telang Highschool, Godhra. For higher studies, he joined Gujarat College in Ahmedabad and completed his first year there. He moved to Baroda College in Baroda for the second year. Influenced by Mahatma Gandhi, he postponed his studies in order to participate in the non-cooperation movement in 1920. When Gujarat Vidyapith was founded, he joined and graduated among its first batch of students in 1921. He befriended Amritlal Modi and Ambalal Vyas there. In Panchmahal region, he participated in the independence movement activities with his friends and others. He briefly worked with Swami Anand at the Navjivan trust. He later joined the Rashtriya Adarsh Vinaymandir school in Ahmedabad as the teacher of Sanskrit in 1921. In 1922, he decided to never marry and became involved in social work and politics.

== Spiritual career ==
Due to his spiritual inclination, he left his job and accepted asceticism. After spending some time in Ranapur, in December 1925, he moved to Nareshwar on the bank of Narmada River. He recited Saraswati's Shri Dattapurana 108 times there. He completed the Narmada Prarikrama (religious circumvention of Narmada river) in 108 days on foot in 1927. He meditated and undertook tapa (austerities). He again completed the Parikrama in 1930. His residence Dattakutir was constructed and a trust was formed in 1931. In 1936, when his younger brother died, his mother moved to Nareshwar and lived there till her death in 1967. A hospital was also built there later.

He died on 19 November 1968 (Kartika Vad 30) at Haridwar (now in Uttarakhand, India) on the bank of the Ganga River. His body was brought to Nareshwar and cremated two days later on 21 November.

His followers worship him as an incarnation of Dattatreya. He played an important role in spreading Datta-panth (path of Dattatreya) in Gujarat, India. His ashram (hermitage) is located at Nareshwar, Gujarat.

== Works ==
Rang Avadhoot was fluent in Gujarati, Hindi, Marathi, English and Sanskrit.

Under the pen name of Ganjeri, he started writing columns on contemporary issues in dailies. Between 1918 and 1925, he wrote and translated several works. He translated Ernest Howard Crosby's Tolstoy as a Schoolmaster as Tolstoy Ane Shikshan (1924) in Gujarati. Upanishadni Vato (1924) and Vishnupuranni Varta (1924) are his works on the Upanishads and Vishnu Purana. Girvahbhasha Pravesh 1-2 (1924) is a work on Sanskrit grammar which he prepared for students when he taught Sanskrit in a school. Sadbodhshatakam-Balbodhini (1924) is a commentary on shlokas (verses) selected by Kaka Kalelkar from Bhartṛhari's Śatakatraya and dedicated to the students. He also co-translated Leo Tolstoy's What Shall We Do Then? (Note: What Is to Be Done? is the most common English translation title. What Shall We Do Then? is another title used.) as Tyare Karishu Shu? (1928) in Gujarati with Narhari Parikh. His other works during this period include Rentiyanu Rahasya, Swaraj-Kirtan, Ahinsa Etle Shu?, columns published under title of Bhangno Loto.

After accepting asceticism, he wrote about 45 works mostly focused on spirituality and devotion to Dattatreya. He wrote Bhajans (devotional songs) collected under the title Avadhooti Anand (1931). Ranghridayam (1932) has stotras (hymns) on knowledge and devotion. His Shri Guruleelamrit (1934–36) contains more than 19,005 dohras (couplets) divided in three volumes and 148 chapters. He composed Dattabavani (1935), a 52 stanza poem dedicated to Dattatreya which is popular in Gujarat. Patrageeta (1939) is a collection of 16 letters about spirituality addressed to his friend Amrutlal Modi. Rangtarang (1951) is a collection of Marathi Abhang Bhajans. Amar Adesh (1955) is a collection of his various lectures. Shrirang Patramanjusha 1-2 (1975, 1986) is a collection of letters addressed to friends and relatives. Sangeetgeeta is an original verse translation of the Bhagwad Geeta in Gujarati.

His other major works (some published posthumously) are Ranghridayam (1932), Nareshwar Mahatmya, Shri Vasudevnam-Sudha, Vasudev Saptashati (1970), Shri Saptashati Gurucharitra, Dattayag-paddhati (1973), Shri Gurumurti Charitra, Prashnottargeeta (1976), Datta Namsmaran.

== See also ==
- List of Gujarati-language writers
