= Shri Guru Charitra =

Biographical book

The Shri Guru Charitra is a book based on the life of Shri Nrusimha Saraswati (a.k.a. Narasimha Saraswati), written by the 15th-16th century poet Shri Saraswati Gangadhar.

The book is based on the life of Shri Narshimha Saraswati, his philosophy and related stories. The language used is the 14-15th century Marathi. The book is written as a conversation between Siddha (who is a disciple of Shri Narasimha Saraswati) and Naamdharak who is listening to Siddha.

Guru Charitra is divided into 3 parts: Dnyan kaand (Knowledge), Karma kaand (Work) and Bhakti Kaand (Devotion). It has 53 Chapters in which, the 53rd chapter is also called as ′Gurucharitra Avatarnika′ which is the summary of the book.

The book is assumed to be written in a village in Karnataka known as Kadaganchi. The writer was Saraswati Gangadhar who was a poet and an extreme vanshaj of Sayamdev Sakhare one of the disciples from four favorite disciples of Shri Narasimha Saraswati.

== Concept and narration ==
Shri Guru Charitra begins with the story of a character called Naamdharak, who is a personification of a common man, buried with mundane burdens. Naamdharak is troubled with the worldly pains and sets out in search of a Guru for some spiritual guidance. During his journey, he first sees a yogi in his dream. He is wonderstruck to see the same yogi in real when he wakes up. The yogi introduces himself as Siddha, a disciple of Sree Nrusiha saraswati. This is the point where Naamdharak asks Siddha to narrate him the holy Guru Chartira.

At the start of each chapter, Siddha and Naamdharak converse on a question, a thought or on an incident from the past chapter. This is how the chapters progress into either a story or an incident-miracle or biographical anecdotes from the life of a holy Datta incarnation.

== Structure ==
Shri Guru Charitra contains 53 chapters in total.

- 1 to 24 chapters are considered as ‘Gyana Kaand’
- 25 to 37 chapters are considered as ‘Karma Kaand’
- 38 to 53 chapters are considered as ‘Bhakti Kaand’

Chapter 4 celebrates the birth of Lord Dattatreya. From this chapter on the biography of Datta avatars start.

Chapter 5 to 10 has accounts of Sreepaad Sreevallabh, the first incarnation of Lord Dattatreya. These chapters describe Birth, travels and miracles performed by Sreepaad Sreevallabh. However, Sree Guru Charitra presents a brief account of Sreepaad Sreevallabh. A more comprehensive biography of Sreepaad Sreevallabh is presented in another 17th century text named ‘Sreepaad Sreevallabh Charitra Amrut’

From Chapter 11, Sree Nrusimha saraswati's life is described. Nrusimha Saraswati is born in Karanja in Washim district of Vidarbha in Maharashtra and at a very young, he adopted Sanyasi life style, travelling to holy places across India. At Kashi Nrusimha Saraswti accepted Krishna Saraswati as his guru and hence came to be known as Nrusimha Saraswati.

Since chapter 13, Guru Charitra chronicles the life journey of Sree Nrusimha Saraswati. He performed countless miracles, taught the righteous path of dharma and karma. Chapter 23 describes an important event – establishment of Mutt at Ganagapur .

In chapters 25, 26,27 the essence of Vedas is encapsulated very accurately.

Chapter 31, 32 and 36 elaborate about code of conduct of a Woman, Widow and a Brahmin respectively.

Stories connected to Rudraksh, Bhasma (holy ash), Ashvatt tree, Karma, sins and atonement Pryashchitta are also explained by Sree Guru himself.

Chapter 51 narrates the account of Sree Guru Nrusimha Saraswati ending his avatar.

Chapter 53 is a summary of all the chapters, known as ‘Guru Charitra Avatarnika’

== Chronology ==
The chronology introduced in the Shri Guru Charitra of Shri Guru Narasimha Saraswati is as follows:

The main events of Sri Narasimha Saraswati's life are given below. Possible years and dates are given according to descriptions of the lunar and stellar events calendar mentioned in the Shri GuruCharitra.

- Sha. 1300 (1378 CE): Birth
- Sha. 1307 (1385 CE): Upanayan
- Sha. 1308 (1386 CE): Left home
- Sha. 1310 (1388 CE): Took Sanyas
- Sha. 1338 (1416 CE): Arrived back home at Lad-Karanja
- Sha. 1340 (1418 CE): Travelled along the banks of the river Gautami
- Sha. 1342 (1420 CE): Stayed at Parali-Vaijanath
- Sha. 1343 (1421 CE): Stayed at Audumbar (near Bhilawadi)
- Sha. 1344-1356 (1422-1434 CE): Stayed at Narsobawadi (Narsobachi Wadi, Narasimhapur)
- Sha. 1357-1380 (1435-1458 CE): Stayed at Ganagapur (Gandharvapur)
- Sha. 1380 (14 January 1459 CE): Nijanandagaman at Shrishailasm Mountain

The extreme 24 characteristics of Shri Gurumurti Narsahimha saraswati swami maharaj.

The 24 teachers from mother nature

#	Guru	Observation	Dattatreya's learning
1.	Earth	Steadfastly productive, does its dharma, gets abused, heals and is steady in giving nourishment.	forebearance, remain undisturbed even if oppressed, keep healing even if others injure you
2.	Wind	Passes through everything and everyone, unchanged, unattached, like Truth; sometimes becomes a gale, disturbs and changes the world, like Truth.	be free like the wind, yet resolute true to your own force
3.	Sky	the highest has no boundaries, no limits, is unaffected even if clouds and thunderstorms come and go	the highest within oneself, the Atman (self, soul) has no limits, it is undifferentiated nondual no matter what, let the clouds of materiality pass, be one with your soul and the Universal Self
4.	Water	serves all without pride, discrimination; is transparent to everyone; purifies and gives life to everyone it touches	a saint discriminates against no one and is never arrogant, lets other give him impurity, yet he always remains pure and cleanses
5.	Fire	purifies and reforms everything it comes in contact with, its energy shapes things	the heat of knowledge reforms everything it comes in contact with, to shape oneself one needs the energy of learning
6.	Moon	waxes and wanes but its oneness doesn't change	birth, death, rebirth and the cycle of existence does not change the oneness of soul, like moon it is a continuous eternal reality
7.	Sun	source of light and gives its gift to all creatures as a sense of duty; in rain puddles it reflects and seems like distinct in each puddle, yet it is the same one Sun	the soul may appear different in different bodies, yet everyone is connected and the soul is same in all; like Sun, one must share one's gifts as a sense of duty
8.	Pigeons	they suffer losses in the hands of violent hunters, warn against obsessive attachments to anyone or to material things in this world	do not be obsessive, don't focus on transient things such as damage or personal loss, human life is a rare privilege to learn, discover one's soul and reach moksha
9.	Python	eats whatever comes its way, makes the most from what it consumes	be content with what you have, make the most from life's gifts
10.	Bumblebee	active, works hard to build and create its reserve by directly visiting the flowers, but is selective and uses discretion, harmonious with flowers and never kills or over consumes	be active, go directly to the sources of knowledge, seek wisdom from all sources but choose the nectar, be gentle, live harmoniously and leave others or other ideologies alone when you must
11.	Beekeeper	profits from honeybees	don't crave for material pleasures or in piling up treasures, neither the body nor material wealth ever lasts
12.	Hawk	picks up a large chunk of food, but other birds harass him, when it drops its food other birds leave him alone	take what you need, not more
13.	Ocean	lucid at the surface, but deep and undisturbed within; receives numerous rivers yet remains the same	let rivers of sensory input not bother who you are deep inside, know your depths, seek self-knowledge, be unperturbed by life, equipoise
14.	Moth	is deceived by its senses, it runs to the fire in misunderstanding which kills it	question your senses, question what others are telling you, question what you see, know senses can deceive, seek reason
15.	Elephant	is deceived by his lust, runs after the smell of a possible mate, and falls into a pit made by mahout's then fettered and used	don't lust after something or someone, don't fall into traps of others or of sensory gratification
16.	Deer	is deceived by his fear, by hunters who beat drums and scare him into a waiting net	fear not the noise, and do not succumb to pressure others design for you
17.	Fish	is deceived by bait and so lured to its death	greed not the crumbs someone places before you, there are plenty of healthy opportunities everywhere
18.	Courtesan	exchanges transient pleasure with body, but feels dejected with meaningless life, ultimately moves on	many prostitute their time, self-respect and principles for various reasons but feel dejected with their career and circumstances, seek meaning and spirituality in life, move on to doing things you love to do
19.	Child	lives a life of innocent bliss	be a child, curious, innocent, blissful
20.	Maiden	she is poor yet tries her best to feed her family and guest, as she cooks she avoids attracting attention to her kitchen and poverty, by breaking all her bangles except one on each wrist	don't seek attention, a yogi accomplishes and shares more through solitude
21.	Snake	lives in whatever hole that comes his way, willingly leaves bad skin and molts	a yogi can live in any place, must be ready to molt old ideas and body for rebirth of his spirit
22.	Arrowsmith	the best one was so lost in his work that he failed to notice the king's procession that passed his way	concentrate on what you love to do, intense concentration is the way to self-realization
23.	Spider	builds a beautiful web, destroys and abandons the web, then restarts again	don't get entangled by your own web, be ready to abandon it, go with yourAtman
24.	Caterpillar	starts out closed in a tiny nest but ultimately becomes a wasp	long journeys start small, a disciple starts out as insignificant but ultimately becomes a spiritual master

== Datta Sampradayas ==
With time, many learned saints and seers have formed different traditions based on Datta Bhakti. These Traditions or Sampradayas are commonly known as Datta Sampradayas.

=== Nath Sampradaya ===
The Nath yogis, that metamorphosed into a warrior ascetic group, consider Dattatreya as their theological founder. This group grew and became particularly prominent during the Islamic invasions and Hindu-Muslim wars in South Asia, from about the 14th to 18th century, although the Dattatreya roots of the peaceful Nath yogis go back to about the 10th century. The group was most active in Rajasthan, Gujarat, Maharashtra, Madhya Pradesh, Uttar Pradesh and Nepal. The tradition believes that the legendary Nath sampradaya yogi and Hatha Yoga innovator Gorakshanath was inspired and shaped by Dattatreya. Regional efforts and texts of the Nath tradition such as Yogi sampradaya vishkriti discussed Dattatreya.

=== Avadhuta Sampradaya ===
The nine Narayanas of the Avadhuta sampradaya are attributed to Dattatreya, an idea also found in the Natha sampradaya. A panth started by Pantmaharaj Balekundrikar of Balekundri near Belgavi is related to this.

=== Dasanami sampradaya and Shakti pithas ===
Dattatreya is revered in Dasanami and goddess-oriented Shaktism traditions.

=== Bhakti traditions ===
Dattatetreya's theology emphasizing simple life, kindness to all, questioning the status quo, self pursuit of knowledge and seeking spiritual meaning of life appealed to Bhakti sant-poets of Hinduism such as Tukaram and Eknath, during an era of political and social upheaval caused by Islamic invasion in the Deccan region of India. They reverentially mentioned Dattatreya in their poems. The use of his symbolism was one of the many syncretic themes of this period where the ideas of Vaishnavism and Shaivism holistically fused in popular imagination.

=== Mahanubhava Sampradaya ===
Along with Krishna, the Mahanubhavas consider Dattatreya as their divine inspiration. The Mahanubhava sampradaya, propagated by Sri Chakradhar Swami, has five Krishnas as the incarnations of god, of which Dattatreya is one. The followers of Mahanubhava philosophy revered him as their Adi Guru (the original Guru), as well as the early teachers in their tradition (Chakradhara, Gundama and Changadeva). They worship Dattatreya as single headed with two arms. He has a temple dedicated in Mahur by this tradition.

=== Shri Guru Charitra tradition ===
This tradition follows from Shripad Shrivallabha and Shri Narasimha Saraswati. Two major Datta traditions were started by Shri Swami Samarth of Akkalkot and Shri Vasudevananda Saraswati alias Tembe Swami.

=== Lal Padris ===
another Hindu yogi group from western India with roots in the 10th-century and with ideas similar to Nath and Kanphata sampradaya, traces Dattatreya as the basis of their spiritual ideas.

Around 1550 CE, Dattatreya Yogi taught the Dattatreya philosophy to his disciple Das Gosavi in Marathi. Das Gosavi then taught this philosophy to his two Telugu disciples Gopalbhatt and Sarvaved who studied and translated Das Gosavi's book of Vedantavyavaharsangraha into Telugu language. According to Prof. R. C. Dhere, Dattatreya Yogi and Das Gosavi are the original gurus in the Telugu Dattatreya tradition. Prof. Rao states that Dattatreya Shatakamu was written by Paramanandateertha who is equally important in his contributions to the Telugu tradition of Dattatreya. He was a proponent of Advaita philosophy and dedicated his two epics, Anubhavadarpanamu and Shivadnyanamanjari to Shri Dattatreya. His famous Vivekachintamani book was translated into Kannada by Nijashivagunayogi and Lingayat saint Shanatalingaswami translated this into Marathi.

== Places mentioned in Guru Charitra ==
Name Of the Place	Description
Gangapur	The primary abode of Sree Nrusiha Saraswati. This is where the Mutt established by him is still present, wherein, Sree Guru's Nirgun Padukas (Holy Sandles) are worshiped.
Pithapuram	Pithapuram is the birthplace of Sreepaad SreeVallabh.
Varanasi	A prominent holy place of Hinduism in India.
Badrinath	A prominent holy place of Hinduism in India.
Gokarna	Chapters 6 and 7 of Sree Guru Charitra mentions the importance of this place and its related stories.
Lanka	Refers to present Sri Lanka. References to the Lankan king Ravan from Ramayan is also mentioned here.
Kailasa	Mt Kailasa, which is considered to be the abode of Lord Shiva.
Srisailam	A prominent holy place of Hinduism in India. Sree Nrusiha Saraswati ended his divine avatar here in a place called Kardalivanam.
Nivrati Sangam	The Famous Confluence Point of River Krishna and Bhima
Kuruvapur	The tapobhumi-karmabhumi of Sreepaad Sreevallabh stayed here for 10 years and ended his holy avatar.
Bidar	Princely state during the time of Sree Nrusiha Saraswati, within which Ganagapur is situated.
Lad Karanja	The Birthplace of Sree Nrusiha Saraswati
Basar	
Prayag	A prominent holy place of Hinduism in India.
Gangasagar	
Triymbakeshwar	A prominent holy place of Hinduism in India.
manjirika	
Vaidhyanath	A prominent holy place of Hinduism in India.
Arogya Bhavani	A small temple in a village located near Parali Vaidyanath. The temple still has the basement where Sree Guru used to meditate.
Pushkar	A prominent holy place of Hinduism in India. It has the only temple dedicated to Lord Bramha.
Rameshvaram	A prominent holy place of Hinduism in India.
Naimesharanya	
Kanchi Koti	
Dwarka (Dwaraka)	
Kedar	A prominent holy place of Hinduism in India.
Kurukshtra	
Gaya	A prominent holy place of Hinduism in India.
Shambhalgram	
Pandharpur	
Kumbhakonam	
Kanyakumari	
Bhilwadi	
Kollhapur	A prominent holy place of Hinduism in India.
Kalleshwar	
Mahabaleshwar	A prominent holy place of Hinduism in India.
Amarpur	
Audumbar	
Shirol	
Kumasi	
Kashmir	
Nandigram	
Kardali Vanam	

== Further read ==
- Shri Guru Charitra Audio (Marathi & English)
- Shri Guru Charitra texts
- TransLiteral Foundation made available online transliterated Marathi version
- Shri Guru Charitra Android App
