= Narsobawadi =

Nrusinhwadi
- Village
- Nrusinhwadi
- Nickname: (narasobāchi wāḍī)
- Interactive map of Nrusinhwadi
- Coordinates: 16.69°N 74.60°E
- Country: India
- State: Maharashtra
- District: Sangli

Languages
  - Official: Marathi
- Time zone: UTC+5:30 (IST)
- PIN: 416104
- Nearest cities: Sangli is 19 km and Kolhapur is 48 km
- Nearest Railway Station: Sangli railway station is 20 km

Nrusinhawadi commonly known as Narsobawadi or Narsobachi Wadi is a small town in Shirol Tahasil in Kolhapur district, Maharashtra. Narsobawadi gets its name from the presence of 'Shri Nrusinha Saraswati', the Purna Avatar of Lord Dattatreya.

With much archaeological value, this became a major pilgrim spot for many Shri Dattatreya devotees. Also, there is a confluence of the two rivers Panchganga and Krishna.

== Description ==
Nrusinhawadi is famous for the Hindu temple of Shri Nrusinha Saraswati (Marathi: नृसिंह सरस्वती) (1378–1458) located on the banks of the river Krushna.

Shri Dattatreya in his Nrusinha Saraswati incarnation is believed to have lived here for as long as 12 years. (Ref. Shri Gurucharitra). The life story of Shri Nrusinha Saraswati, his philosophy and related stories are described in Shri Guru Charitra. There are no images or idols here which show his presence. But there are two padukas or slippers which immortalize his great avatar.

Temple's Daily Schedule:

05.00 Kakad Aarti and Paduka Puja
08.00 to 12.00 Rudrabhishek
12.30 to 13.30 Maha Puja, Aarti
15.00 to 16.00 Pavamana Sookta Parayan
19.30 Dhoop Aarti
20.00 Palkhi
22.00 Shej Aarti
(after the Shej Aarti the temple is closed for devotees)

Vasudevanand Saraswati Maharaj, also known as Tembe Swami, a saint of recent times who is regarded as an incarnation of Dattatreya stayed here for 12 years. The room where Maharaj stayed is near the famous Datta temple which has the padukas of Dattatreya.

== Festivals celebrated in Temple ==
1. Datta Jayanti
2. Narasimha Jayanti is celebrated in the Hindu calendar Pushya month
3. Gopal Kala Utsav is celebrated from Magha Poornima to Phalguna Panchami.
4. Sripada Srivallabha Jayanthi is celebrated in Badrapada Masa on Ganesha Chaturthi Day
5. Dakshin dwar Sohla in which Krishna river water flows from North gate to South gate through temple

== Location and transport ==
Narasimhawadi is a small town located at the banks of Krishna River. It is about 3 km from Shirol Taluka. Kurundawad is the nearest town and is about 2 km away. Medical City, Miraj is at a distance of 19 km. State transport bus depot is located close to the temple premises. Narasimhawadi may be reached by state transport buses that available from Jaysingpur and Kolhapur. Nearest railway station is Jaysingpur which is about 17 km from this place. There are state transport buses connecting nearby cities. There are share jeeps and private vehicles available too. The typical distances from major cities in Maharashtra are: Pune – Narsoba Wadi (254 km), Sangli – Narsoba Wadi (22 km), Miraj – Narsoba Wadi (19 km), Jaysingpur – Narsoba Wadi (16.7 km), Kolhapur – Narsoba Wadi (52 km), Audumbar – Narsoba Wadi (53 km), Nipanni – Narsoba Wadi (45 km), Mumbai – Narsoba Wadi (405 km via Mumbai Bangalore Express Highway). (Ref. Google Maps)

=== Railways ===
Central Railway's Sangli railway station is the closest Railway stations which is connected to almost all parts of India.

Nearest railway station Sangli is 22 km from Narsobawadi. Sangli station is the nearest major railway station, about 22 km (14 mi) away on the Mumbai–Bangalore main line. Sangli railway station is also connected to the city via bus services. From Sangli railway station, there are several trains to Delhi, Mumbai, Bengaluru, Pune, Goa, Mysuru, Hubli, Belgaum, Surat, Vadodara, Ahmedabad, Jodhpur, Udaipur, Bikaner, Ajmer, Agra, Gwalior, Jhansi, Puducherry, Tirunelveli(Kanyakumari), Guntakal, Tiruchirapali, Ratlam, Kota, Nagpur, Itarsi, Chitaurgarh, Abu Road, Gandhidham etc. Sangli station is convenient to reach from Narsobawadi.

Many Devotees from North Karnataka prefer Sangli railway station to visit Narsobawadi. Further Jaysingpur station is smaller, but closest to the destination. Jaysingpur falls in between the cities of Sangli and Kolhapur.

== Amenities ==
The town is known for its Basundi and Kandi pedhe. Kavathachi barfi is another local delicacy. There are many small food stalls around temple premises serving hot local preparations like amboli, kat-wada, mirchi bhajiyas and fresh sugarcane juice. Lodgings is available at local brahmin houses at reasonable rate. The hosts also serve simple homemade Brahmin meals.
