= Bhikshuka Upanishad =

One of the minor Upanishads of Hinduism

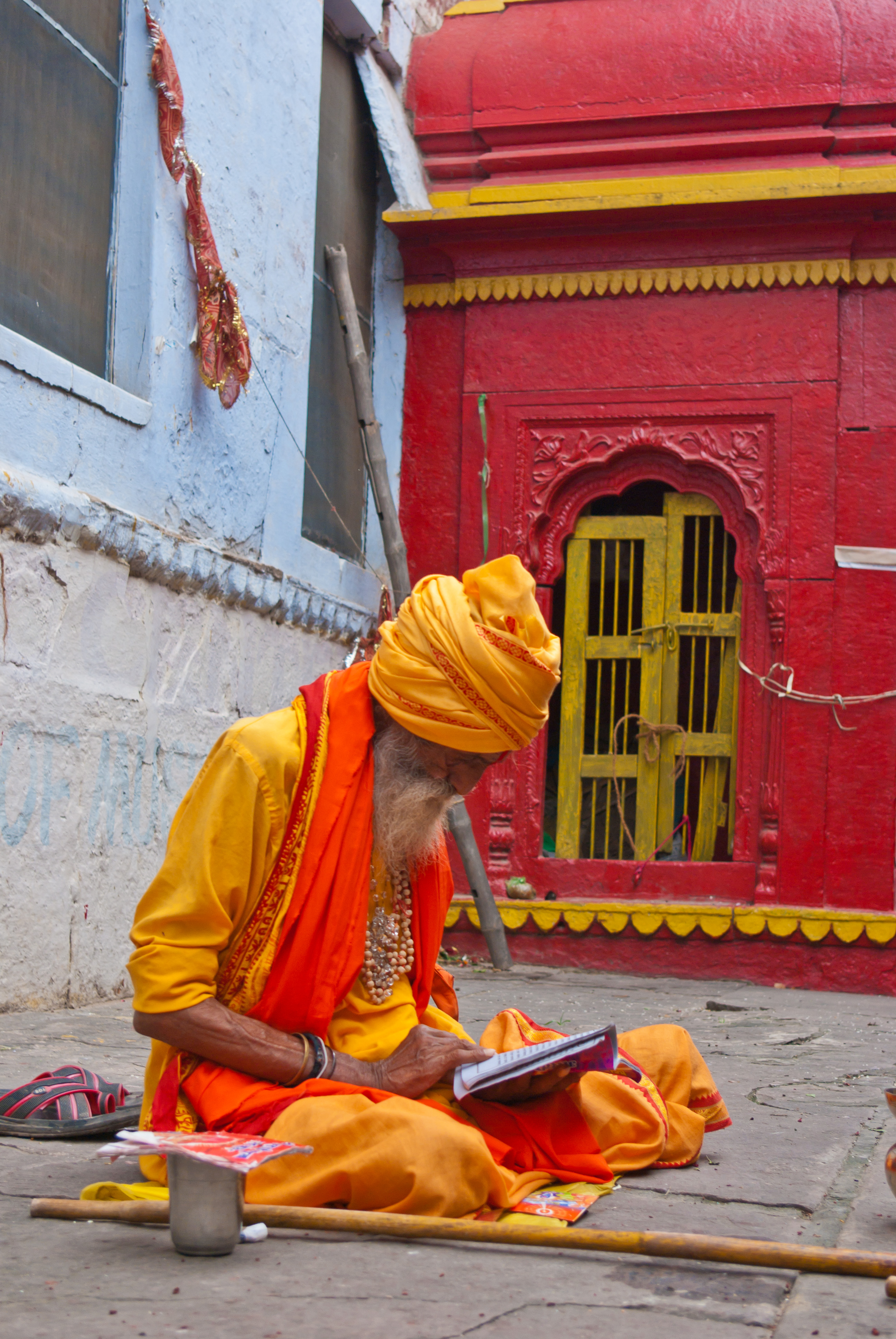
- The Bhikshuka Upanishad describes Hindu mendicants who seek spiritual liberation through the practise of yoga
- Devanagari: भिक्षुक
- IAST: Bhikṣuka
- Title means: Ascetic or Mendicant
- Type: Sannyasa
- Linked Veda: Shukla Yajurveda
- Chapters: 1
- Verses: 5
- Philosophy: Vedanta

The Bhikshuka Upanishad (Sanskrit: भिक्षुक उपनिषत्, IAST: Bhikṣuka Upaniṣad), also known as Bhikshukopanishad, is one of the minor Upanishads of Hinduism and is written in Sanskrit.

The Upanishad describes four kinds of sannyasins (Hindu monks), their eating habits and lifestyle. Yoga is the path of spiritual liberation for all four. Of these, the Paramahamsa monks are discussed in this text at greater length, and described as loners who are patient with everyone, free from dualism in their thoughts, and who meditate on their soul and the Brahman.

== Etymology ==
Bhikshuka means "mendicant" or "monk", and is derived from the root word Bhiksu meaning "one who subsists entirely on alms".

== History ==
The author of the Bhikshuka Upanishad is unknown, as is its date of composition. It was probably composed in the late medieval to modern era, most likely in the 14th or 15th century. The text has ancient roots, as its contents are identical in key details to chapter 4 of the Ashrama Upanishad, which is dated to about the 3rd century CE. Both texts mention four types of mendicants with nearly identical life styles. The two texts have a few minor differences. The much older Ashrama Upanishad, for example, mentions that each type aspires to know their self (Atman) for liberation, while the Bhikshuka specifies that they seek this liberation through a yogic path.

The Bhikshuka Upanishad is a minor Upanishad attached to the Shukla Yajurveda. It is classified as one of the Sannyasa (renunciation) Upanishads of Hinduism. The text is listed at number 60 in the serial order in the Muktika enumerated by Rama to Hanuman, in the modern era anthology of 108 Upanishads. Some surviving manuscripts of the text are titled Bhikshukopanishad (भिक्षुकोपनिषत्).

== Contents ==
Bhikshuka Upanishad consists of a single chapter of five verses. The first verse states that four types of mendicants seek liberation, and these are Kutichaka, Bahudaka, Hamsa and Paramahamsa. The text describes the frugal lifestyle of all four, and asserts that they all pursue their goal of attaining moksha only through yoga practice. The first three mendicant types are mentioned briefly, while the majority of the text describes the fourth type: Paramahamsa mendicants.

=== Kutichaka, Bahudaka and Hamsa monks ===
The Upanishad states that Kutichaka monks eat eight mouthfuls of food a day. Prominent ancient Rishis (sages) who illustrate the Kutichaka group are Gotama, Bharadwaja, Yajnavalkya, and Vasishta.

The Bahudaka mendicants carry a water pot and a triple staff walking stick. They wear a topknot hair style and ochre-coloured garments, and wear a sacrificial thread. The Bahudaka do not eat meat or honey, and beg for their eight mouthfuls of food a day.

The Hamsa mendicants are constantly on the move, staying in villages for just one night, in towns no more than five nights, and in sacred places for no more than seven nights. The ascetic practice of Hamsa monks includes daily consumption of the urine and dung of a cow. The Hamsa monks practice the Chandrayana cycle in their food eating habit, wherein they vary the amount of food they eat with the lunar cycle. They eat a single mouthful of food on the day after the dark new moon night, increase their food intake by an extra mouthful each day as the size of the moon increases, and reach the maximum fifteen mouthfuls of food for the day after full moon night. Thereafter, they decrease their food intake by a mouthful each day until they reach the new moon night and begin the cycle again with one mouthful the following day.

=== Paramahamsa monks ===
The Bhikshuka Upanishad illustrates the Paramahamsa (literally, "highest wandering birds") mendicants with a list of names. The list includes Samvartaka, Aruni, Svetaketu, Jadabharata, Dattatreya, Shuka, Vamadeva, and Haritaka. They eat only eight mouthfuls of food a day and prefer a life away from others. They live clothed, naked or in rags.

The Upanishad dedicates the rest of the verses to describing the beliefs of the Paramhamsa monks. For example,

न तेषां धर्माधर्मौ लाभालाभौ
शुद्धाशुद्धौ द्वैतवर्जिता समलोष्टाश्मकाञ्चनाः
सर्ववर्णेषु भैक्षाचरणं कृत्वा सर्वत्रात्मैवेति पश्यन्ति
अथ जातरूपधरा निर्द्वन्द्वा निष्परिग्रहाः
शुक्लध्यानपरायणा आत्मनिष्टाः प्राणसन्धारणार्थे

With them, there are no dvaita (dualities) as dharma and adharma, gain or loss,
purity and impurity. They look upon these with the same eye, and to gold, stone and clod of earth with indifference,
they put up with everything, they are patient with everyone, they seek and accept food from anyone,
they do not distinguish people by caste or looks, they are non-covetous and non-craving (aparigraha),
they are free from all duality, engaged in contemplation, meditate on Atman.

— Bhiksuka Upanishad 5

The Paramhamsa monks, who are loners, are to be found in deserted houses, in temples, straw huts, on ant hills, sitting under a tree, on sand beds near rivers, in mountain caves, near waterfalls, in hollows inside trees, or in wide open fields. The Upanishad states that these loners have advanced far in their path of reaching Brahman – they are pure in mind, they are the Paramahamsas.

== Influence ==
The classification of mendicants in the Bhikshuka Upanishad, their moderate eating habits and their simple lifestyles, is found in many Indian texts such as the Mahabharata sections 1.7.86–87 and 13.129.

Gananath Obeyesekere, an Emeritus Professor of Anthropology at the Princeton University, states that the beliefs championed and attributed in Bhikshuka Upanishad are traceable to Vedic literature such as Jaiminiya Brahmana. These views are also found in other Upanishads such as the Narada-parivrajakopanishad and Brhat-Sannyasa Upanishad. In all these texts, the renouncer is accepted to be one who, in pursuit of spirituality, was "no longer part of the social world and is indifferent to its mores".

A test or marker of this state of existence is where "right and wrong", socially popular "truths or untruths", everyday morality, and whatever is happening in the world makes no difference to the monk, where after abandoning the "truths and untruths, one abandons that by which one abandons". The individual is entirely driven by his soul, which he sees to be the Brahman.

== See also ==
- Asceticism
- Jabala Upanishad
- Paramahamsa Upanishad

== Bibliography ==
- Deussen, Paul; Bedekar, V.M. (tr.); Palsule, G.B. (tr.) (1997). Sixty Upanishads of the Veda. Motilal Banarsidass. ISBN 978-81-208-1467-7.
- Knapp, Stephen (2005). The Heart of Hinduism: The Eastern Path to Freedom, Empowerment, and Illumination. iUniverse. ISBN 978-0-595-35075-9.
- Olivelle, Patrick (1992). The Samnyasa Upanisads. Oxford University Press. ISBN 978-0-19-507045-3.
- Parmeshwaranand, Swami (2000). Encyclopaedic Dictionary of Upanisads. Sarup & Sons. ISBN 978-81-7625-148-8.
- Tinoco, Carlos Alberto (1997). Upanishads. IBRASA. ISBN 978-85-348-0040-2.
