= Sripada Sri Vallabha =

Medieval Hindu religious leader (born 1320)

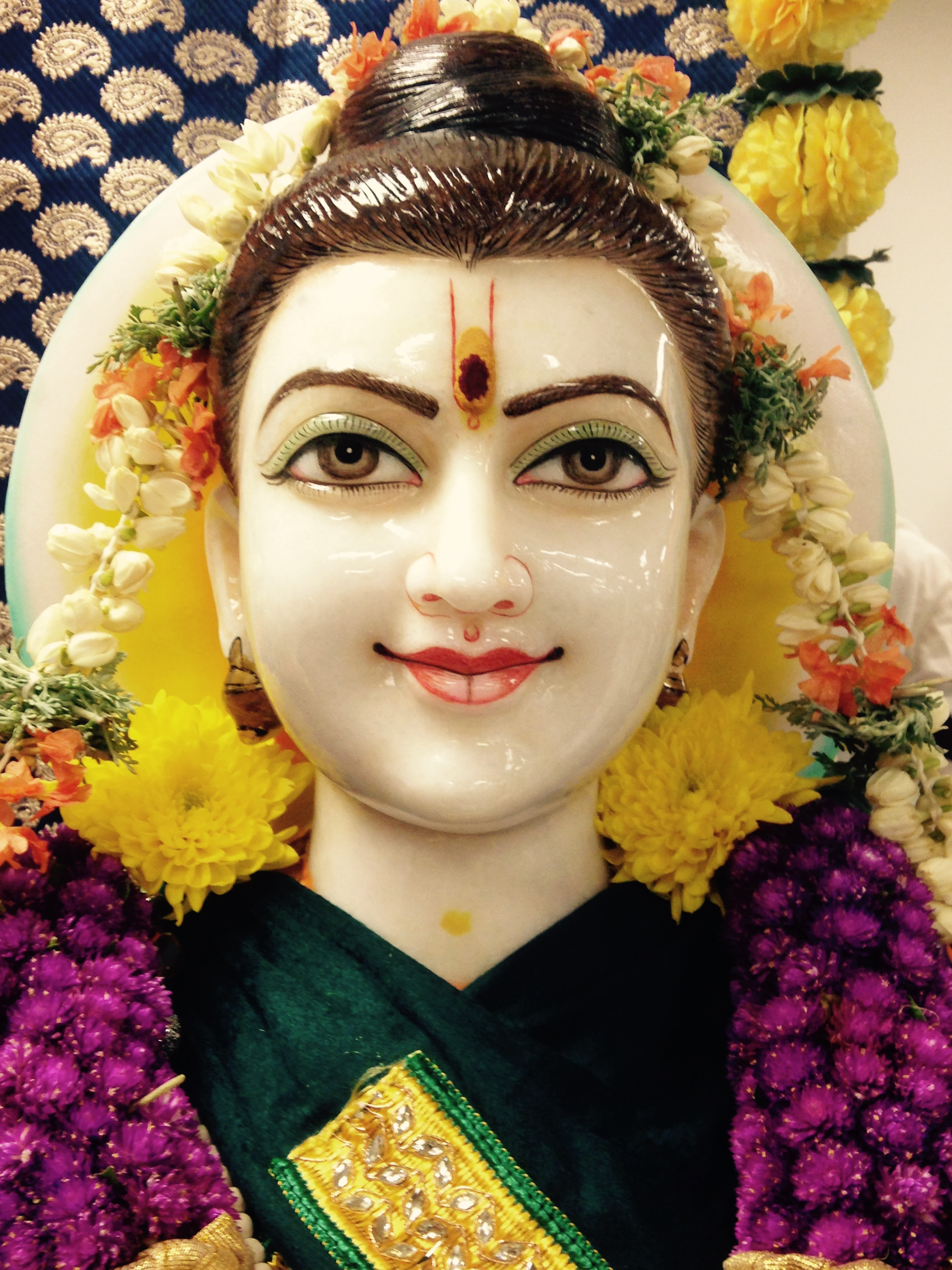
- Sripada Sri Vallabha

Personal life
- Born: 1320 Pithapuram
- Died: Unknown

Religious life
- Religion: Hinduism

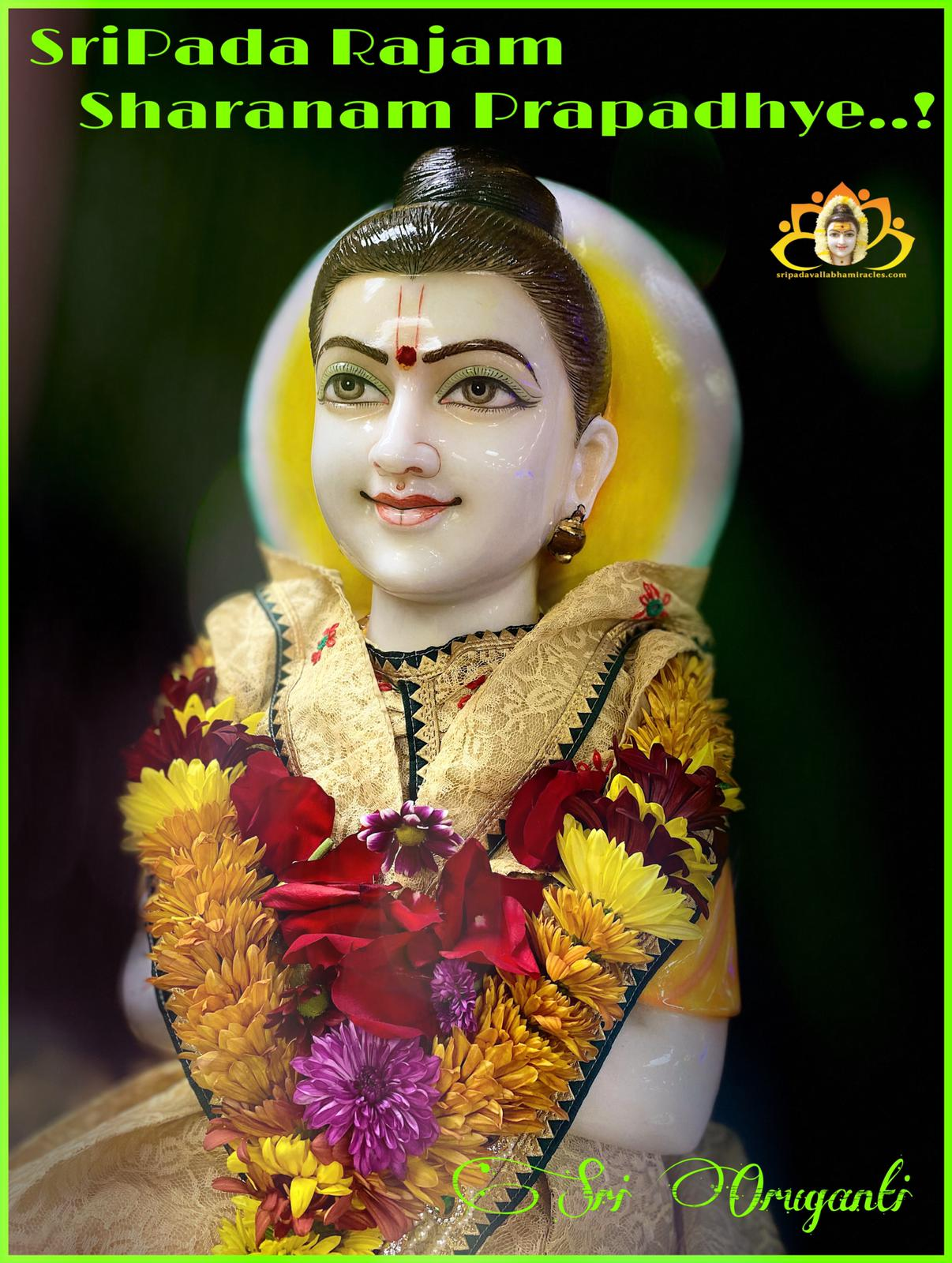

Sripada Sri Vallabha (Telugu: శ్రీపాద శ్రీవల్లభ) (born 1320) is an Indian guru who is an incarnation of Dattatreya. He is considered as one of the first complete avatars (incarnations) of the deity Dattatreya in Kali Yuga. Narasimha Saraswati, Manik Prabhu, Swami Samarthand Sai Baba of Shirdi are believed to be other incarnations of Dattatreya that followed Sripada Sri Vallabha.

Sripada Sri Vallabha was born and lived in Pithapuram, formerly known as Pitikapuram, a town in present-day Andhra Pradesh in India. The grandparents of Sripada Srivallabha belonged to the Malayadri village of Palnadu District of Andhra Pradesh state in India. Malladi Bapanna Avadhanulu of Harithasa gotra is the maternal grandfather of Sripada. His wife Rajamamba also belonged to a scholar's family. Her brother was Malladi Sridhara Avadhanlu. It is said that once the two scholars went to Ainavilli, a remote area in the Godavari district, and conducted a yajna during which they actually made Ganapati appear. The god declared that as a result he would be reborn as Sripada Sri Vallabha on Ganesh Chaturthi. Later, both went to Pithapuram village and settled there.

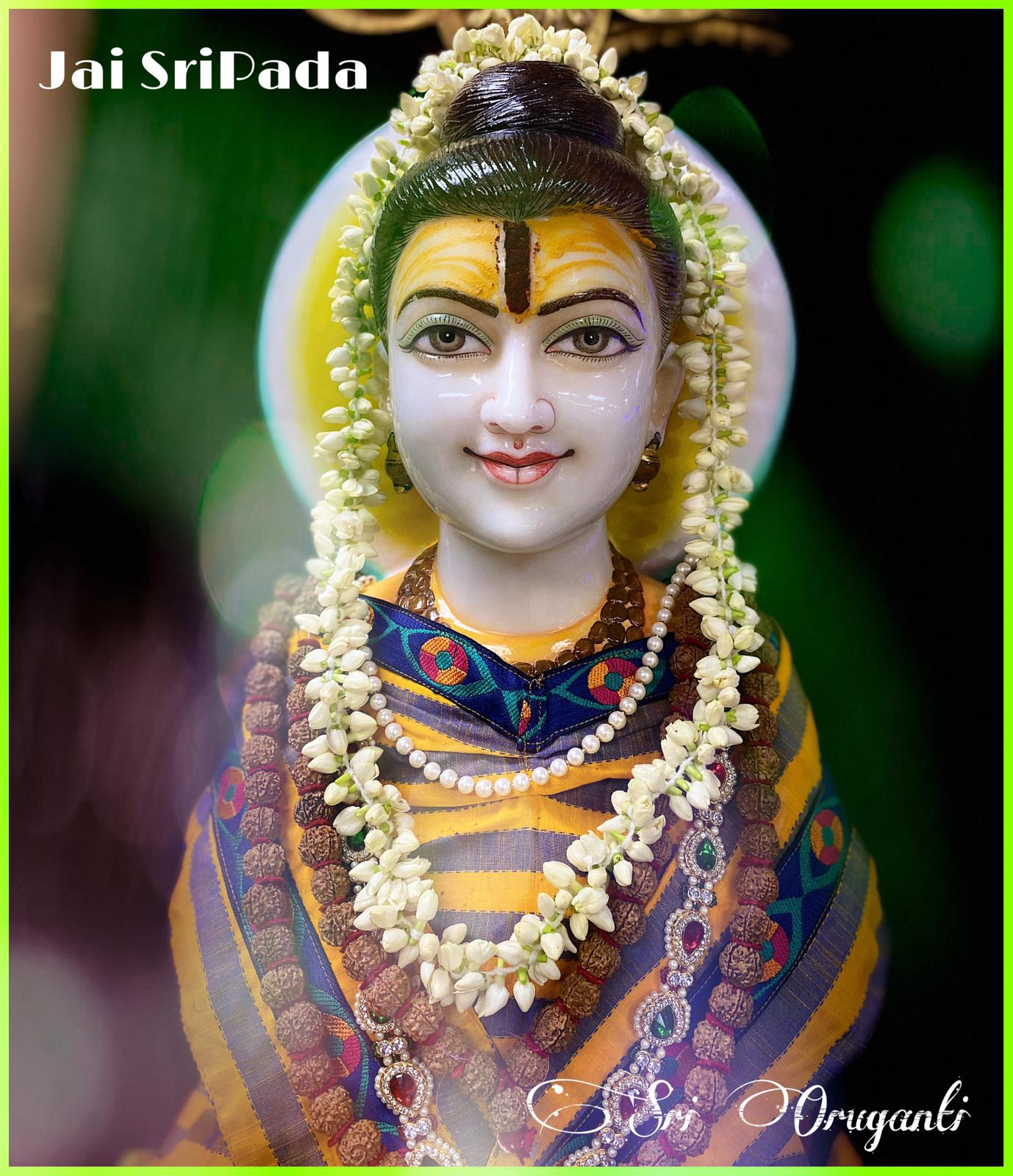

Sripada Sri Vallabha took sannyasa the age of 16 years and took jalasamadhi at the age of 30. Some of the noted holy places that Sripada Sri Vallabha visited during his lifetime include Kashi (Varanasi), Badarikashram, Gokarna, Srisailam and Kuravapura. Sripada Sri Vallabha stayed in Kurupuram much of his life. The religious significance of Kurupuram is mentioned in the book Shri Guru Charitra and other holy books associated with Dattatreya. It is believed that Sripada Sri Vallabha is chiranjeevi (immortal) and that he took jalsamadhi in Kuravapura or Kurugaddi, a river island on river Krishna near Raichur, Karnataka, where he resides in "tejorup" (pure energy form). On the opposite bank of the river is Vallabhapuram in Telangana, which is a sacred place too. It is believed that Sripada Sri Vallabha use to come from Kuruvapuram to Vallabhapuram by walking on the river.

== Legend of Vallabhesh and Hedgewar family ==
Sometime after Sripada Srivallabha disappeared, a Brahmin named Vallabhesh vowed to go to Kuravapur and feed 1,000 Brahmins if he earned more than his usual profit. Near Kuravapur, Vallabhesh encountered bandits in disguise who robbed and beheaded him. Sripada Srivallabha suddenly appeared from nowhere and killed the bandits with his Trishula; one, who appealed to the saint as Shiva, was spared. Being told, the person spared reattached Vallabhesh's severed head to his body to be brought back to life by the grace of Sripada Srivallabha.

Vallabhesh Brahmin is considered the mula-purush (founder) of the Hedgewar family. K. B. Hedgewar, founder of the Rashtriya Swayamsevak Sangh (RSS), was a ninth-generation descendant of Vallabhesh.

== Sources ==
- Shri Dattatreya Dnyankosh by P. N. Joshi (Shri Dattateya Dnyankosh Prakashan, Pune, 2000).
- Datta-Sampradyacha Itihas (History of Datta Sampradaya) by R. C. Dhere (Padmagnadha Prakashan, Pune).
- Sri Pada Charitra- Shankar Bhatt (Telugu version by Sri Malladi Diskhitulu)
- Sankshipta Sripada Srivallabha Charitramrutam Parayana grantham (abridged by Smt Prasanna Kumari—Telugu version)
- SriPada Sri Vallabha website - www.sripadavallabha.org
- SriPada Sri Vallabha charitamrutam website Sripada Srivallabha Charitamrutam wtt
- SriPada Vallabha Miracles - www.sripadavallabhamiracles.com
- SriPada Sri Vallabha Sansthan Pithapuram, E.G.District, A.P, India

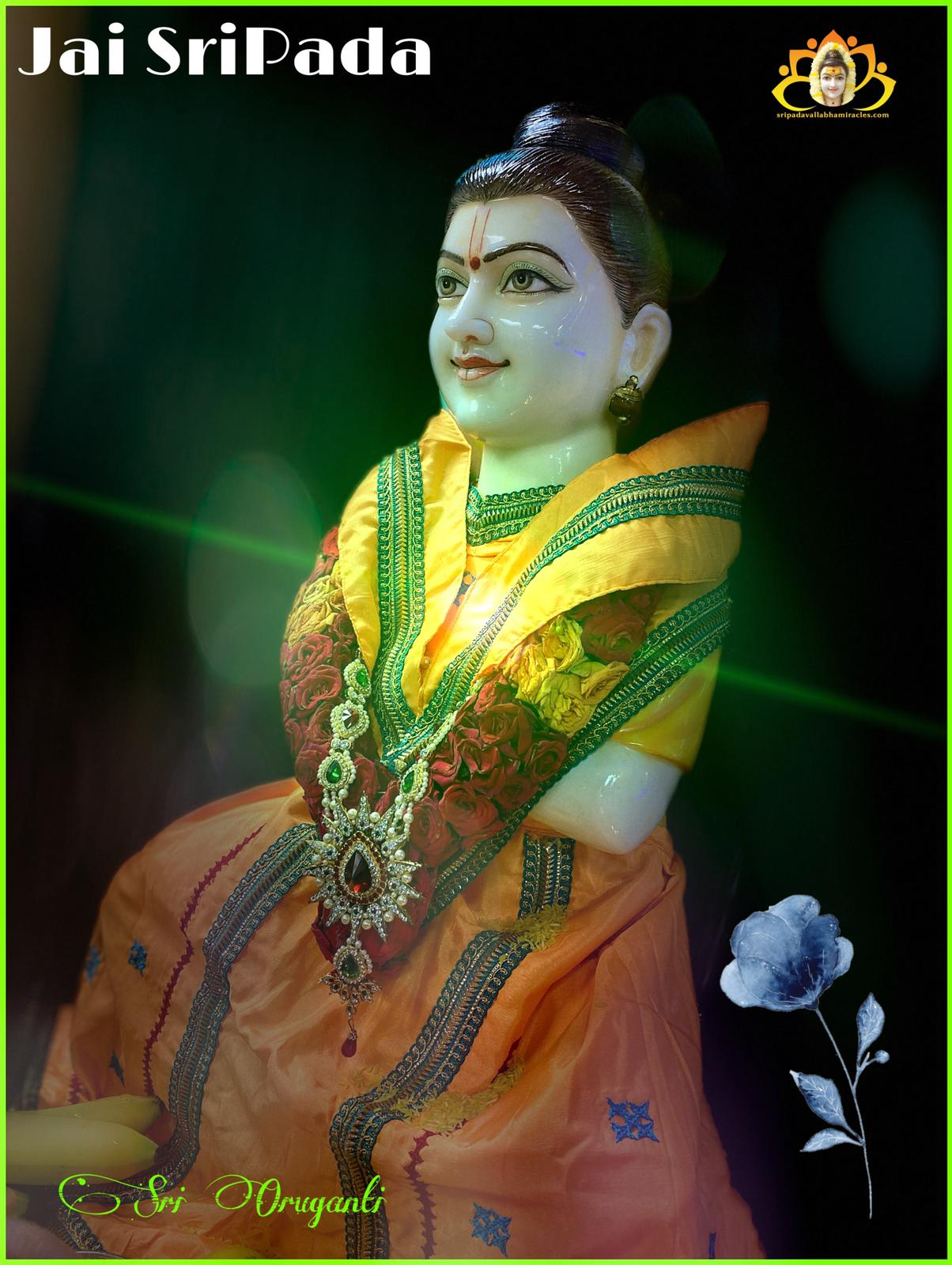

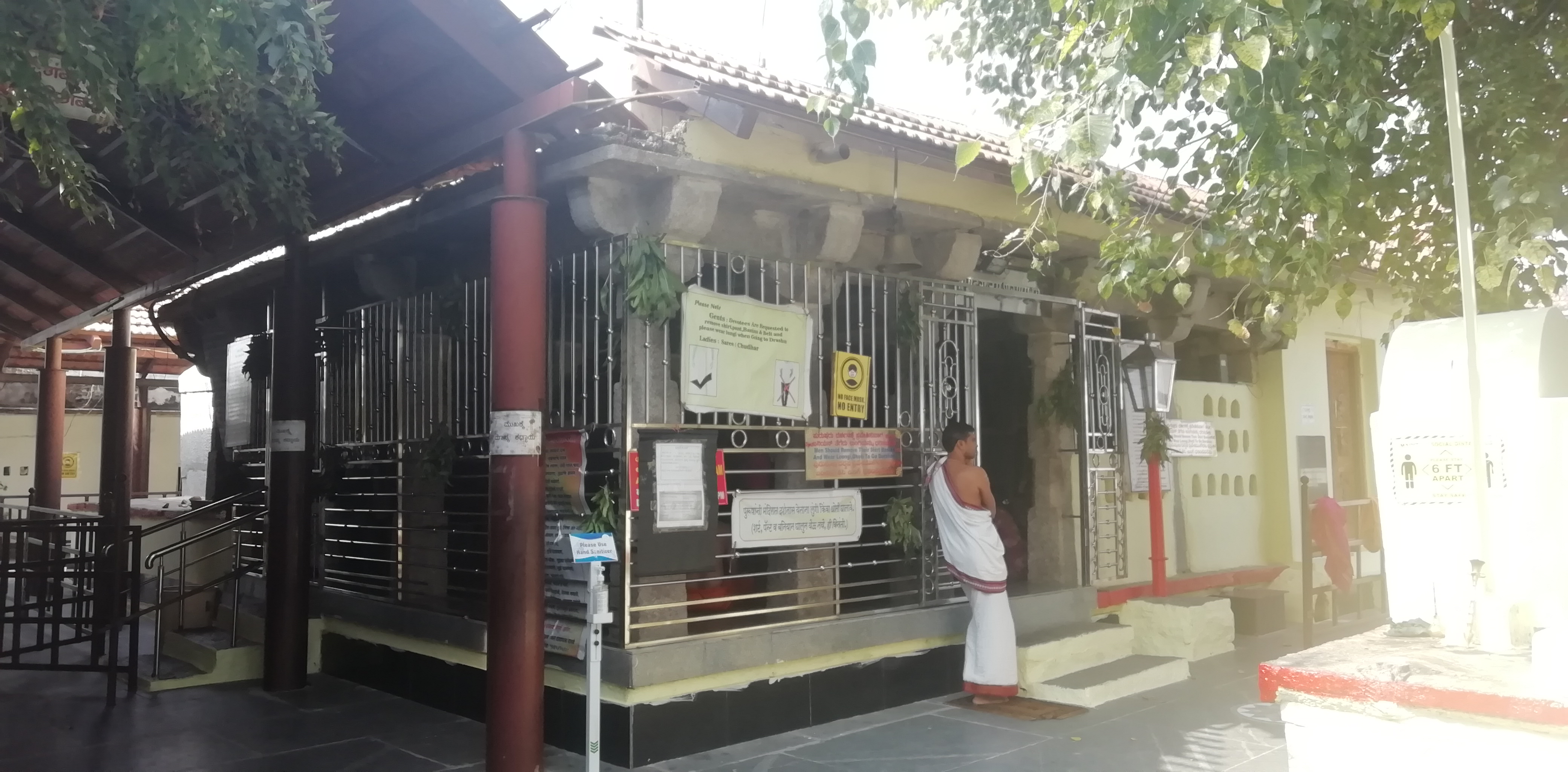
Sripada Srivallabha temple at Kuruvapuram island
