= Kadaganchi =

Kudugunchi
- village
- Location in Karnataka, India Kudugunchi (India)
- Coordinates: 17.4437°N 76.6595°E
- Country: India
- State: Karnataka
- District: Kalaburagi

Population (2011)
  - Total: 8,100

Languages
  - Official: Kannada
- Time zone: UTC+5:30 (IST)
- Telephone code: 08477

Kadaganchi

is a village in the Aland taluk of the Kalaburagi district of the Indian state of Karnataka.

== Travel ==
Kudugunchi is located 21 kilometres (13 miles) from Kalaburagi on the State Highway # 10 (SH-10) with frequent services of buses, trucks, etc. Autorickshaws and jeeps are used locally as well as to reach-out to neighboring villages.

== Education ==
It has a government primary school and Vidya Vardhaka Sangha High School. The Central University of Karnataka (CUK) is located in this village.

== Demographics ==
As of 2011 India census, Kudugunchi had a population of 8,100 with 4,186 males and 3,914 females.

== Geography ==
Kadaganchi is located at 17.26°N 76.39°E.

== Religion ==
Lingayats are the predominant community. Deepavali and Ugadi are the two major festivals celebrated by the people. "Shri Shantaligeshwara" is the main deity and "Jathra" is celebrated during summer, 7 days after Ugadi. People, irrespective of caste, participate in this 3 day celebration.

Shri Saraswati Gangadhar, the 15th-16th century poet who wrote Shri GuruCharitra श्री गुरूचरित्र is said to have lived in this village.

== Economy ==
Agriculture is the primary occupation in Kadaganchi.
