= Mount Gandhamadana (Rameswaram) =

Mountain on Pamban Island, Tamil Nadu, India

Mt. Gandhamadana (Sanskrit: गन्धमादन, Gandhamādana) is the highest point on Pamban Island near Rameswaram, which lies in the Palk Strait between mainland India and Sri Lanka.

== Location ==
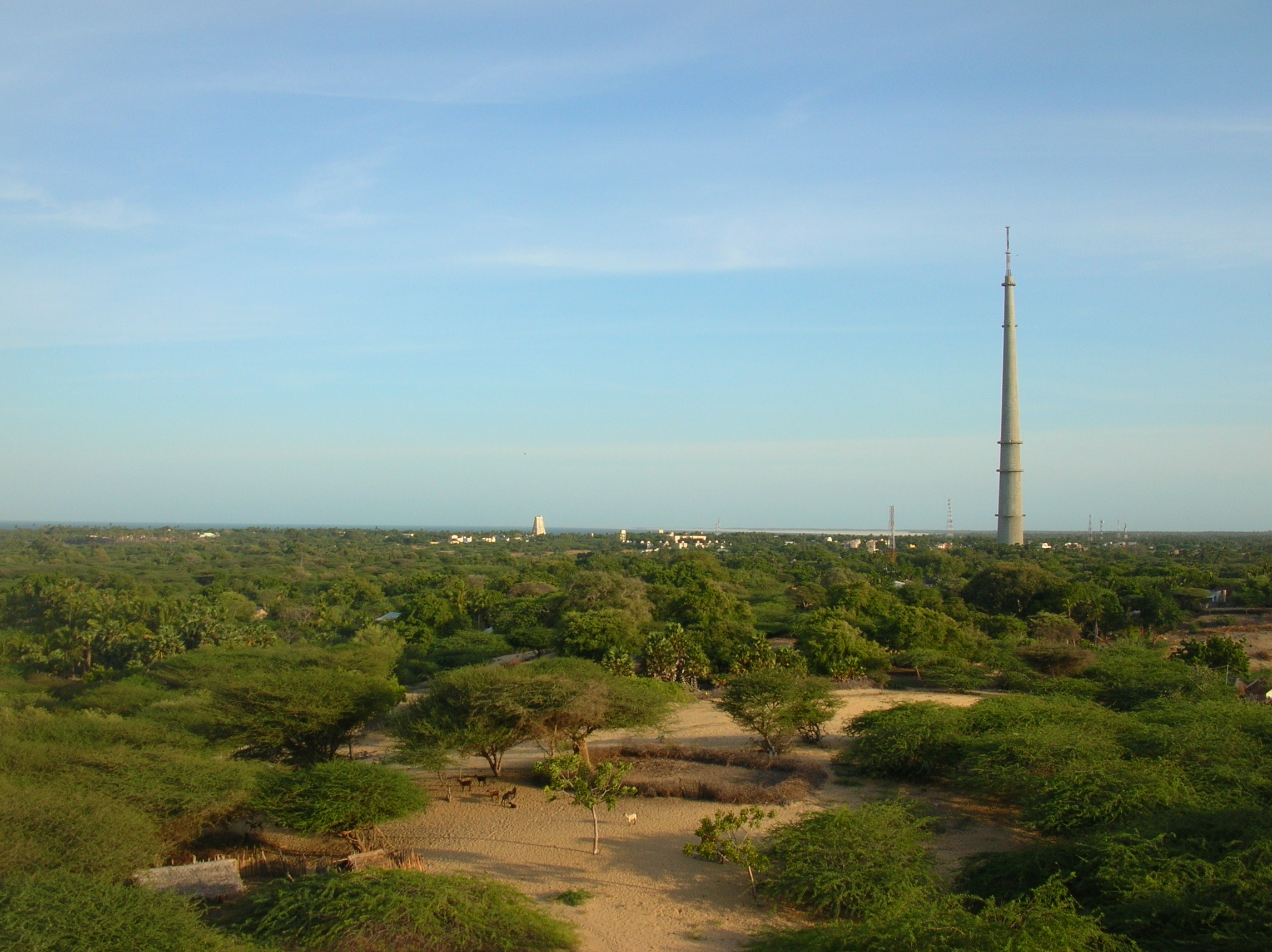
A view of the western part of Pamban Island from the summit of Mount Gandhamadana

Gandhamadana is located 3 kilometres from Rameswaram, almost midway between the western edge of the island and the ghost-town of Dhanushkodi at the corner of the eastern promontory. Lights of Talaimannar, Sri Lanka are visible from here on clear nights.

== Legends ==
Gandhamadana is believed to be the hillock from whose summit, the Lord Rama devotee Hanuman, commenced his flight to Ravana's Lanka. Kalidasa [Kumarasambhava, VI] refers to Gandhamadana, located in the vicinity of the mythical city of Osadhiprastha in the Himalayas, which is home to Santanaka trees. Gandhamadan Parvatam in Ramesvaram is also known as Ramar padam (Rama's Feet).
