= Narasimha Saraswati =

Hindu theologian (1378–1459)

Shree Nrusimha Saraswati नृसिंह सरस्वती
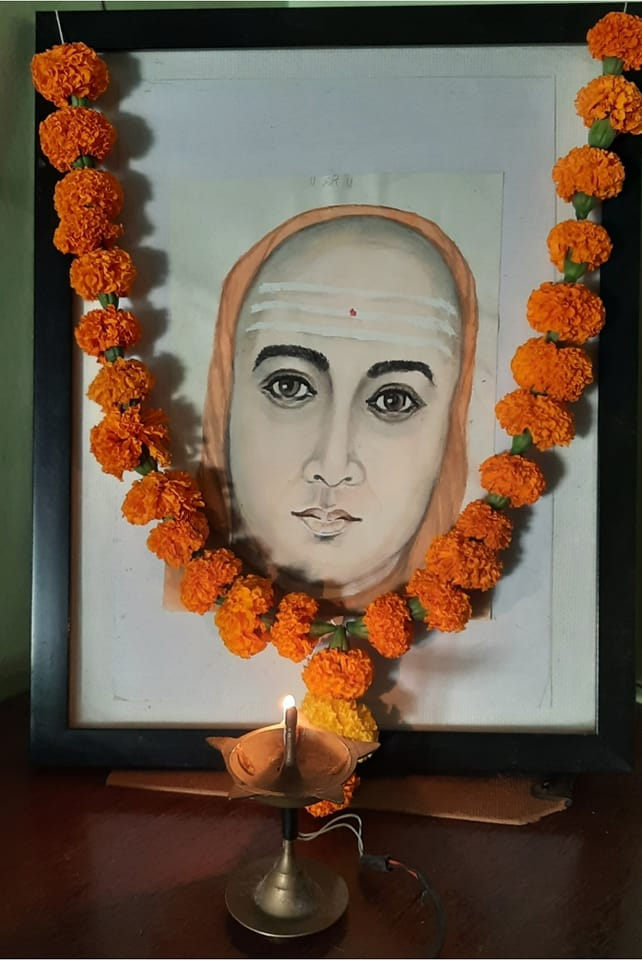

Personal life
- Born: Narahari; 1378 CE Karanja Lad, Bahmani Sultanate (present-day Maharashtra, India)
- Parents: Madhava (father); Ambabhavani (mother)

Religious life
- Religion: Hinduism
- Philosophy: Advaita, Shri Gurucharitra tradition

Military service
- Disappeared: 28 January 1459 (aged 80–81); Disappeared in Kardali Vana near Srisailam, Vijayanagara Kingdom (present-day Andhra Pradesh, India)
- Status: Nijanandagamana

Shree Narasimha Saraswati Swami or Shree Nrusimha Saraswati Swami (श्रीनृसिंह सरस्वती, 1378−1459) was an Indian guru of Dattatreya tradition(sampradaya). According to the Shri GuruCharitra, he is the second avatar of Dattatreya in Kali Yuga after Sripada Sri Vallabha.

== Life ==
Shri Narasimha Saraswati (birth name - Shaligramadeva or Narhari) lived from 1378 to 1459 (Shaka 1300 to Shaka 1380). Saraswati was born into a Deshastha Brahmin family in Karanjapura, modern-day Lad-Karanja (Karanja) in the Washim district, which is a part of Vidarbha region of Maharashtra, India. His father (Madhava) and his mother (Amba-Bhavani) initially named him Narahari or Shaligramadeva, with the surname Kale.

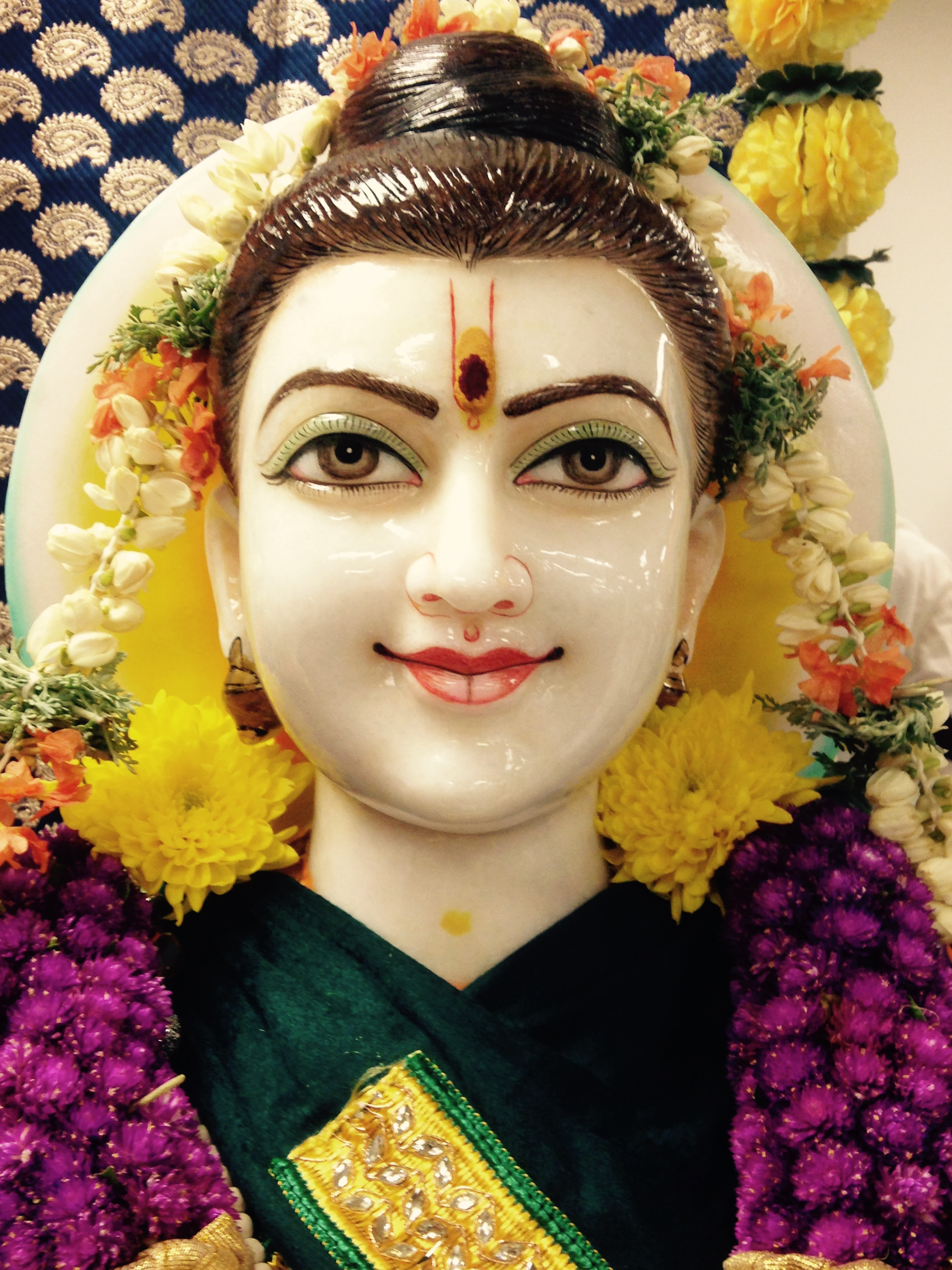
First Incarnation - Sripada Srivallabha

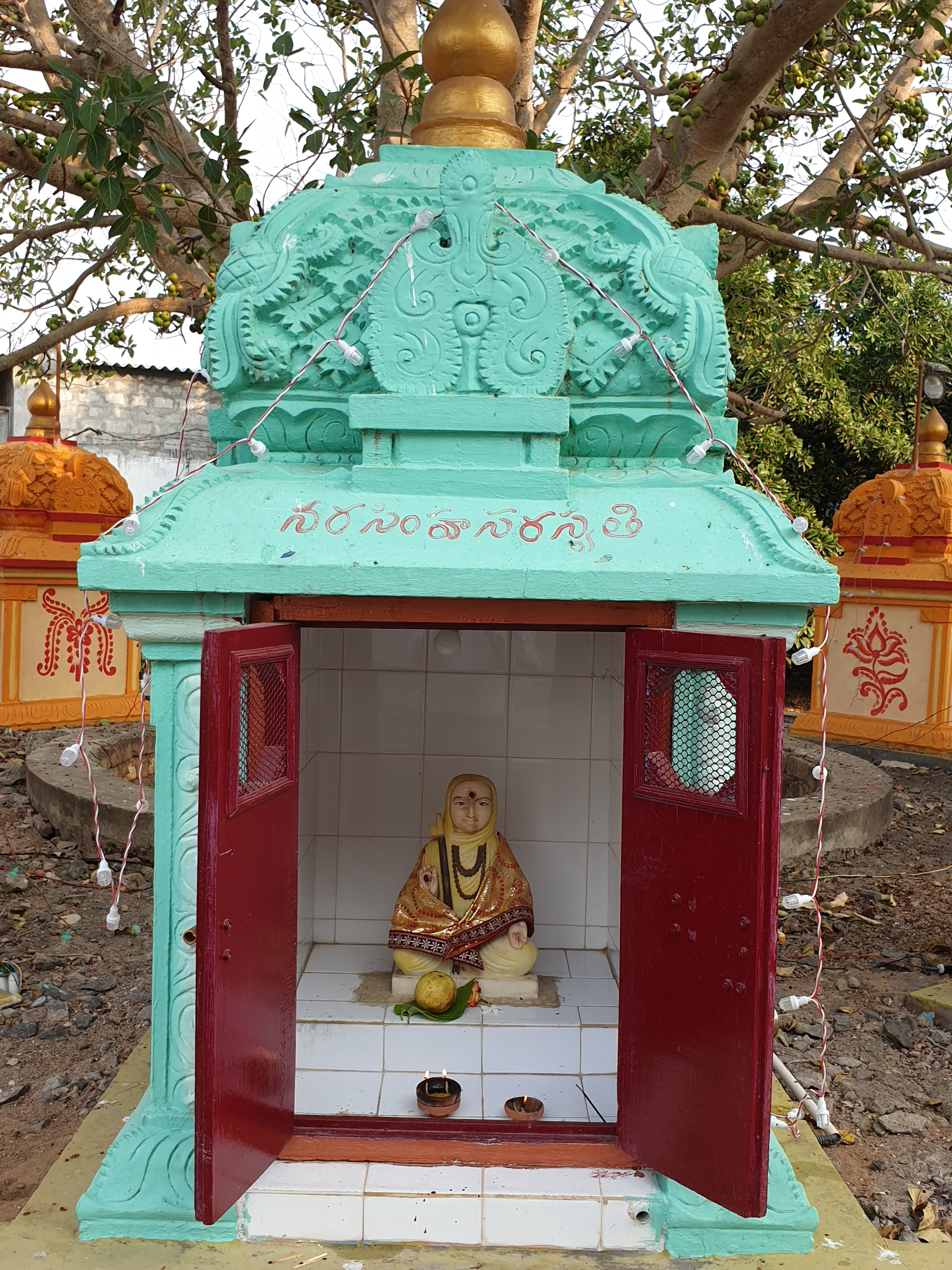

Shri Narasimha Sarswati is considered to be the second incarnation of Dattatreya, the first Incarnation was Sripada Srivallabha, as per his blessings to Amba Bhavani, in her previous birth, Sripada Srivallabha had blessed her & he advised her to perform shiva pooja. Later he also told that he would be born to her in her next life as Narasimha Saraswathi to uphold the Sanatha Dharma in Kali Yuga. This instance has been well narrated from chapter 5 to Chapter 12 in the holy book Guru Charithra

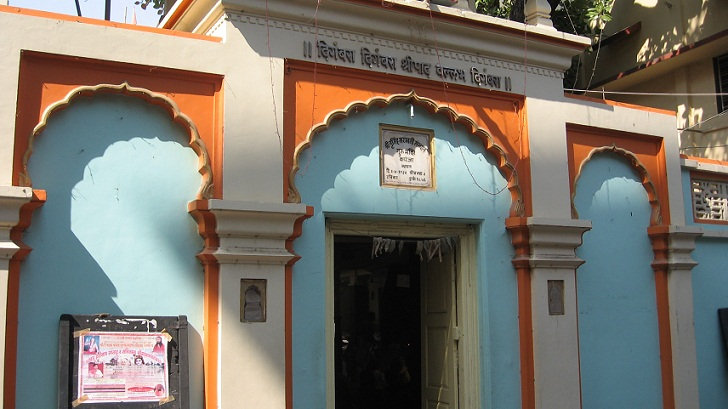
Guru Mandir Karanja-Birthplace

Shri Narasimha Saraswati/ Narhari was a quiet child, only speaks Aum (Om Hinduism sacred word) since their birth. This led his parents to worry about his speech ability; however, Narahari showed through hand gestures that after his upanayana or munji (sacred thread ceremony), he would be able to speak. He started reciting the Vedas after his munja, which so impressed the Brahmins in the village that it was talked about, with senior learned Brahmins coming to him for learning.

Shri Narasimha Saraswati left home in 1386 at the age of 7 all alone and went on a pilgrimage to Kashi on foot. He took Sanyasa at Kashi from Old Sage Shri Krishna Saraswati. The second part of his name came from this guru, who eventually named him Shri Narasimha Saraswati. (This is a Sanskrit name.)

After becoming a Sanyasi, Narasimha Saraswati visited several holy places (tirtha) before returning to Karanja at the age 30 to meet his parents. He visited various places and stayed before settling in Ganagapura (Ganagapur) (now in the state of Karnataka) for the last 20 years of his life.

Towards the end of his life, Shri Narasimha Saraswati met with the Muslim king (Sultan) of Bidar, possibly 'Ala-ud-Din Ahmed Shah' of the Bahmani Sultanate, who was ruling the area at that time.

Since his karma for that avatar had completed, thus he decided to take samadhi. He left for the forest of Kardali (Kardali vana near Srisailam). Saraswati took Nijanandagamana (निजानंदगमन) type of samadhi in 1459 for 300 years.

=== Chronology ===
The main events of Sri Narasimha Saraswati's life are given below. Possible years and dates are given according to descriptions of the lunar and stellar events calendar mentioned in the Shri GuruCharitra.

- Sha. 1300 (1378 CE): Birth Karanja, Washim district, Vidarbha region, Maharashtra
- Sha. 1307 (1385 CE): Upanayan
- Sha. 1308 (1386 CE): Left home
- Sha. 1310 (1388 CE): Took Sanyas
- Sha. 1338 (1416 CE): Arrived back home at Karanja
- Sha. 1340 (1418 CE): Travelled along the banks of the river Gautami
- Sha. 1342 (1420 CE): Stayed at Parali-Vaijanath, Beed district, Maharashtra
- Sha. 1343 (1421 CE): Stayed at Audumbar (near Bhilavadi), Sangli district, Maharashtra
- Sha. 1344-1356 (1422-1434 CE): Stayed at Narasoba Wadi (Narasimhapur), Kolhapur district, Maharashtra
- Sha. 1357-1380 (1435-1458 CE): Stayed for 23 years at Ganagapur, Kalaburagi district, Karnataka
- Sha. 1380 (28 January 1459 CE): Nijanandagamana in Kardali Vana at Srisailam, Nandyal district, Andhra Pradesh

=== Teachings ===
Shree Narshimha Saraswati taught that the life of saints was fully covered by the rules given in the old scriptures and the rules were to be strictly followed by the saints in their daily lives in order to achieve happiness and, ultimately, moksha. He insisted that his disciples follow these routines.

=== Biography ===
Many parts of Saraswati's life are told in the Shri GuruCharitra, written by Saraswati Gangadhar.

== Legacy ==
Saraswati's house where he was born is located in Karanja Lad. Although the house is no longer in the original shape, some parts remain and have been converted into a temple.
