= Vallabhapuram =

Vallabhapuram Guntur district, Andhra Pradesh, India. Village is located at the banks of Krishna river. Famous for the goddess perantallamma in neighbouring villages.
