= Balekundri (B.K.) =

- Village
- Country: India
- State: Karnataka
- District: Belagavi
- Talukas: Belagavi

Languages
  - Official: Kannada
- Time zone: UTC+5:30 (IST)

Balekundri (B.K.) is a village in Belagavi district in the state Karnataka, India.

== Notable people ==
- Panth Maharaj, Hindu yogi who lived in the village with a temple dedicated to him in the village.
