= Ganagapura =

- Village
- Ganagapur
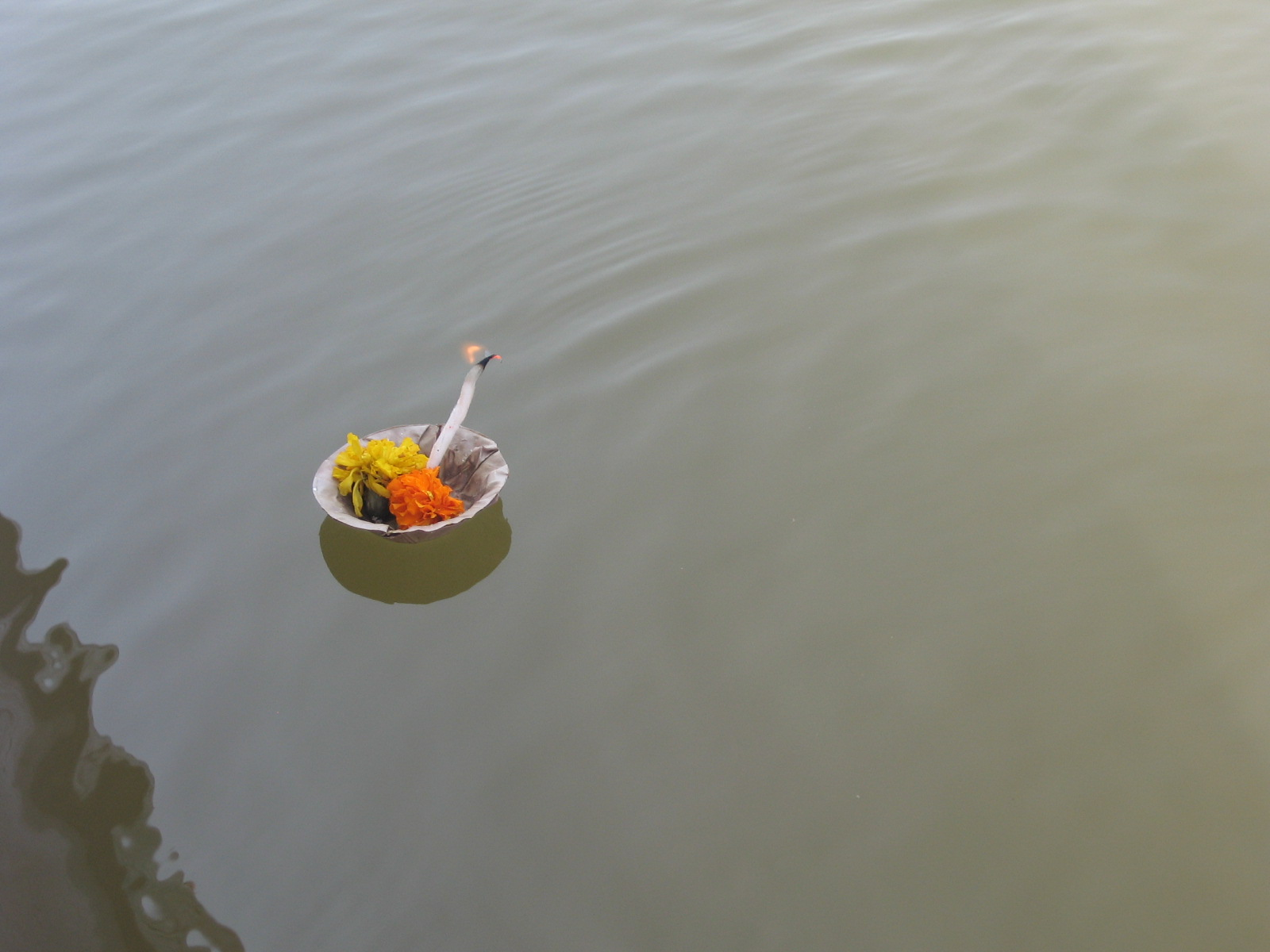
- The Holy confluence of Bhima & Amrja rivers in Ganagapur

- Location in Karnataka, India
- Coordinates: 17.1817700°N 76.534286°E
- Country: India
- State: Karnataka
- District: Gulbarga

Government
  - Body: Town Panchayat

Population (2020)
  - Total: 9,432
- Demonym: Ganagapurnivaru

Language
  - Official: Kannada
- Time zone: UTC+5:30 (IST)
- PIN: 585212
- Telephone code: 08470
- Vehicle registration: KA32
- Nearest city: Afzalpur, Gulbarga
- Lok Sabha constituency: Gulbarga
- Vidhan Sabha constituency: Afzalpura
- Civic agency: Town Panchayat
- Website: https://www.dattakshetraganagapur.com

Ganagapura (Deval Ganagapur) is a village in Karnataka, India, in the Afzalpur taluk of Kalaburagi district in Karnataka. It has a temple to Lord Dattatreya.

== Demographics ==
In India's 2001 census, Ganagapura had a population of 6491, with 3250 males and 3241 females.

== Places of interest ==
Significant places include Nirgun Math, Kalleshewar. The Nirguna Math is adorned with the Nirguna Padukas.

Sangam Kshetra – meeting point of Bhima and Amarja rivers, Audumbar Tree, Ash Hill etc. Below the Audumbar Tree Shree Narasimha Saraswati Swamy Maharaj, Incarnation of God Dattatrey swami has performed Anushtan.

== Transportation ==
There are state-run buses from Gulbarga to Ganagapur. The town is on the railway route. The nearest airport is at Kalaburgi located 52 kilometres from Ganagapur.
