= Dattatreya =

Hindu deity

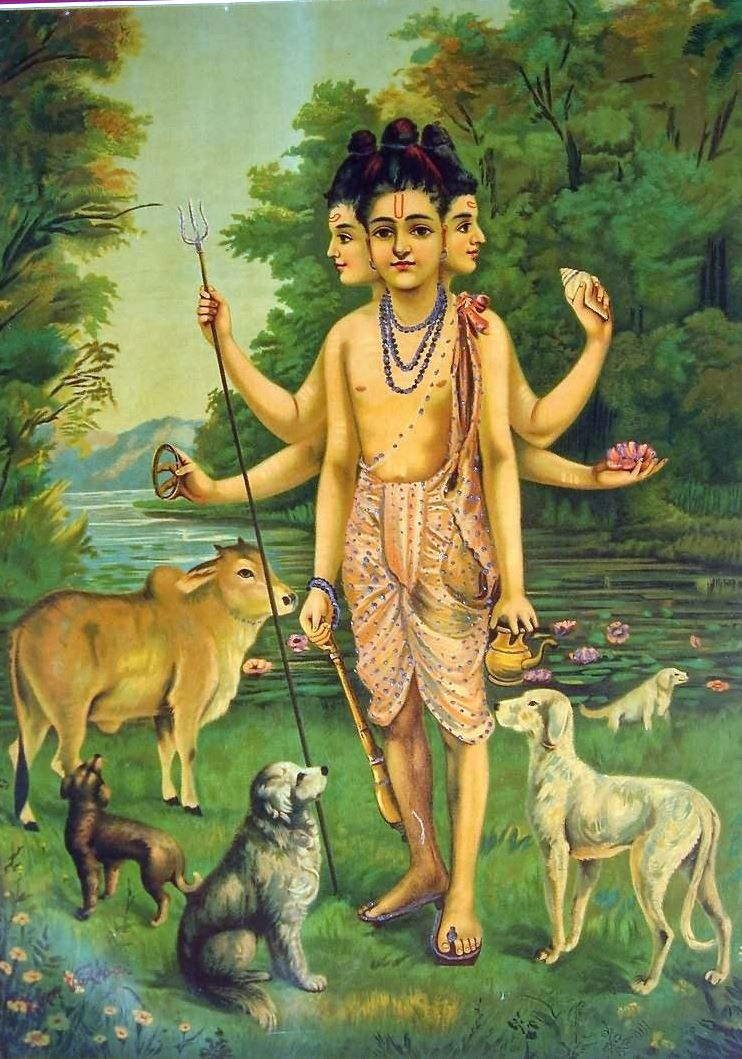
- Shri Dattatreya, Raja Ravi Varma painting (1890)
- Affiliation: Avatar and Combined form of the Trimurti, Manifestation of Parabrahma
- Abode: Varies per interpretation
- Mantra: Om Drāṃ Dattātreyāya Namah
- Symbols: Japamala, Kamandalu, Trishula, Damaru, Panchajanya, and Sudarshana Chakra
- Day: Thursday
- Festivals: Datta Jayanti

Genealogy
- Parents: Atri (father); Anasuya (mother)
- Siblings: Chandra, Durvasa
- Consort: Anagha

Dattatreya (Sanskrit: दत्तात्रेय, IAST: Dattātreya), Dattā or Dattaguru, is a paradigmatic Sannyasi (monk) and one of the lords of yoga, venerated as a Hindu god. He is considered to be an avatar and combined form of the three Hindu gods Brahma, Vishnu, and Shiva, who are also collectively known as the Trimurti, and as the manifestation of Parabrahma, the supreme being, in texts such as the Bhagavata Purana, the Markandeya Purana, and the Brahmanda Purana, though stories about his birth and origin vary from text to text. Several Upanishads are dedicated to him, as are texts of the Vedanta-Yoga tradition in Hinduism. One of the most important texts of Hinduism, namely Avadhuta Gita (literally, "song of the free soul") is attributed to Dattatreya. Over time, Dattatreya has inspired many monastic movements in Shaivism, Vaishnavism, and Shaktism, particularly in the Deccan region of India, Maharashtra, Gujarat, Madhya Pradesh, Rajasthan and Himalayan regions where Shaivism is prevalent. His pursuit of simple life, kindness to all, sharing of his knowledge and the meaning of life during his travels is reverentially mentioned in the poems by Tukaram, a saint-poet of the Bhakti movement.

According to Rigopoulos, in the Nath tradition of Shaivism, Dattatreya is revered as the Adi-Guru (First Teacher) of the Adinath Sampradaya of the Nathas, the first "Lord of Yoga" with mastery of Tantra (techniques), although most traditions and scholars consider Adi Nath to be an epithet of Shiva. According to Mallinson, Dattatreya is not the traditional guru of the Nath Sampradaya but instead was co-opted by the Nath tradition in about the 18th century as a guru, as a part of Vishnu-Shiva syncretism. This is evidenced by the Marathi text Navanathabhaktisara, states Mallinson, wherein there is syncretic fusion of the Nath Sampradaya with the Mahanubhava sect by identifying nine Naths with nine Narayanas.

An annual festival in the Hindu calendar month of Mārgaśīrṣa (November/December) reveres Dattatreya and is known as Datta Jayanti.

In Sikh Religion, Guru Gobind Singh has written life history of Dattatreya in his composition called Rudra Avtar including Birth, Spiritual journey includes 24 Gurus and Realization of Akal Purakh.

== Life ==
In the Puranas, he was born in an Indian hermitage to Anasuya and her husband, the Vedic sage, Atri who is traditionally credited with making the largest contribution to the Rigveda. It is said that they lived in Mahur, Nanded District, Maharashtra. Another states that his father lived in the western Deccan region. A third claims he was born in the jungles of Kashmir near the sacred Amarnath Temple. A fourth legend states he was born along with his brothers Durvasa and Chandra, to an unwed mother named Anusuya, In a fifth myth, sage Atri was very old when young Anusuya married him and they sought the help of the trimurti gods for a child. As the trinity were pleased with them for having brought light and knowledge to the world, instantly granted the boon, which led Dattatreya to be born with characteristics of all three.

While his origins are unclear, stories about his life are clearer. He is described in the Mahabharata as an exceptional Rishi (sage) with extraordinary insights and knowledge, who is adored and raised to a Guru and an Avatar of Vishnu in the Puranas. He is accompined by his consort Lakshmi in form of Anagha Devi. Dattatreya is stated in these texts to having renounced the world and leaving his home at an early age to lead a monastic life. One myth claims he meditated immersed in water for a long time, another has him wandering from childhood. and Dattatreya made a tapa for 12,000 years there. The Tripura-rahasya refers to the disciple Parasurama finding Dattatreya meditating on Gandhamadana mountain, near Rameswaram, Tamil Nadu.

Dattatreya is said to have his lunch daily by taking alms at a holy place Pithapuram, Andhra Pradesh, where he was born as Sripada Sri Vallabha (his first avatar).

=== Self-education: The 24 Gurus of Dattatreya ===
The young Dattatreya is famous in the Hindu texts as the one who started with nothing and without teachers, yet reached self-awareness by observing nature during his Sannyasi wanderings, and treating these natural observations as his twenty four teachers. This legend has been emblematic in the Hindu belief, particularly among artists and Yogis, that ideas, teachings and practices come from all sources, that self effort is a means to learning. The 24 teachers of Dattatreya are:

The 24 teachers from nature
| Serial Number | Guru | Observation | Dattatreya's Learning |
| 1. | Earth | Steadfastly productive, does its dharma, gets abused, heals and is steady in giving nourishment. | forbearance, remain undisturbed even if oppressed, keep healing even if others injure you |
| 2. | Wind | Passes through everything and everyone, unchanged, unattached, like Truth; sometimes becomes a gale, disturbs and changes the world, like Truth. | be free like the wind, yet resolute true to your own force |
| 3. | Sky | the highest has no boundaries, no limits, is unaffected even if clouds and thunderstorms come and go | the highest within oneself, the Atman (self, soul) has no limits, it is undifferentiated non-dual no matter what, let the clouds of materiality pass, be one with your soul and the Universal Self |
| 4. | Water | serves all without pride, discrimination; is transparent to everyone; purifies and gives life to everyone it touches | a saint discriminates against no one and is never arrogant, lets other give him impurity, yet he always remains pure and cleanses |
| 5. | Fire | purifies and reforms everything it comes in contact with, its energy shapes things | the heat of knowledge reforms everything it comes in contact with, to shape oneself one needs the energy of learning |
| 6. | Moon | waxes and wanes but its oneness doesn't change | birth, death, rebirth and the cycle of existence does not change the oneness of soul, like moon it is a continuous eternal reality |
| 7. | Sun | source of light and gives its gift to all creatures as a sense of duty; in rain puddles it reflects and seems like distinct in each puddle, yet it is the same one Sun | the soul may appear different in different bodies, yet everyone is connected and the soul is same in all; like Sun, one must share one's gifts as a sense of duty |
| 8. | Pigeons | they suffer losses in the hands of violent hunters, warn against obsessive attachments to anyone or to material things in this world | do not be obsessive, don't focus on transient things such as damage or personal loss, human life is a rare privilege to learn, discover one's soul and reach moksha |
| 9. | Python | eats whatever comes its way, makes the most from what it consumes | be content with what you have, make the most from life's gifts |
| 10. | Bumblebee | active, works hard to build and create its reserve by directly visiting the flowers, but is selective and uses discretion, harmonious with flowers and never kills or over consumes | be active, go directly to the sources of knowledge, seek wisdom from all sources but choose the nectar, be gentle, live harmoniously and leave others or other ideologies alone when you must |
| 11. | Beekeeper | profits from honeybees | don't crave for material pleasures or in piling up treasures, neither the body nor material wealth ever lasts |
| 12. | Hawk | picks up a large chunk of food, but other birds harass him, when it drops its food other birds leave him alone | take what you need, not more |
| 13. | Ocean | lucid at the surface, but deep and undisturbed within; receives numerous rivers yet remains the same | let rivers of sensory input not bother who you are deep inside, know your depths, seek self-knowledge, be unperturbed by life, equipoise |
| 14. | Moth | is deceived by its senses, it runs to the fire in misunderstanding which kills it | question your senses, question what others are telling you, question what you see, know senses can deceive, seek reason |
| 15. | Elephant | is deceived by his lust, runs after the smell of a possible mate, and falls into a pit made by mahouts then fettered and used | don't lust after something or someone, don't fall into traps of others or of sensory gratification |
| 16. | Deer | is deceived by his fear, by hunters who beat drums and scare him into a waiting net | fear not the noise, and do not succumb to pressure others design for you |
| 17. | Fish | is deceived by bait and so lured to its death | greed not the crumbs someone places before you, there are plenty of healthy opportunities everywhere |
| 18. | Courtesan | exchanges transient pleasure with body, but feels dejected with meaningless life, ultimately moves on | many prostitute their time, self-respect and principles for various reasons but feel dejected with their career and circumstances, seek meaning and spirituality in life, move on to doing things you love to do |
| 19. | Child | lives a life of innocent bliss | be a child, curious, innocent, blissful |
| 20. | Maiden | she is poor yet tries her best to feed her family and guest, as she cooks she avoids attracting attention to her kitchen and poverty, by breaking all her bangles except one on each wrist | don't seek attention, a yogi accomplishes and shares more through solitude |
| 21. | Snake | lives in whatever hole that comes his way, willingly leaves bad skin and molts | a yogi can live in any place, must be ready to molt old ideas and body for rebirth of his spirit |
| 22. | Arrowsmith | the best one was so lost in his work that he failed to notice the king's procession that passed his way | concentrate on what you love to do, intense concentration is the way to self-realization |
| 23. | Spider | builds a beautiful web, destroys and abandons the web, then restarts again | don't get entangled by your own web, be ready to abandon it, go with your Atman |
| 24. | Caterpillar | starts out closed in a tiny nest but ultimately becomes a butterfly | long journeys start small, a disciple starts out as insignificant but ultimately becomes a spiritual master |

== Iconography ==
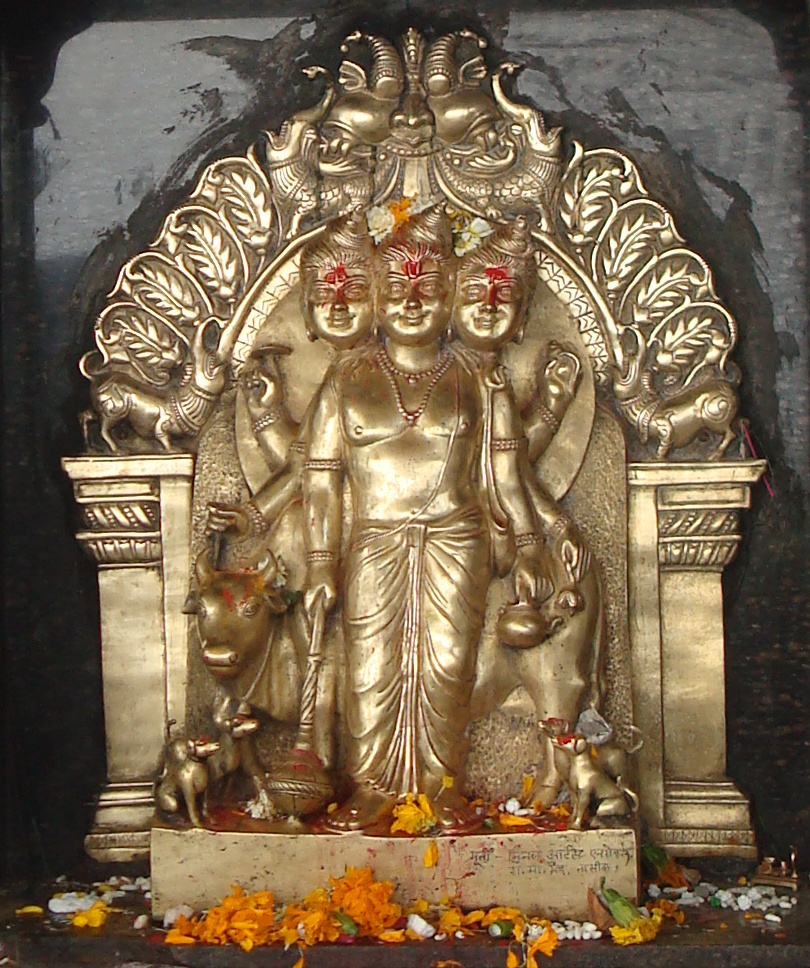
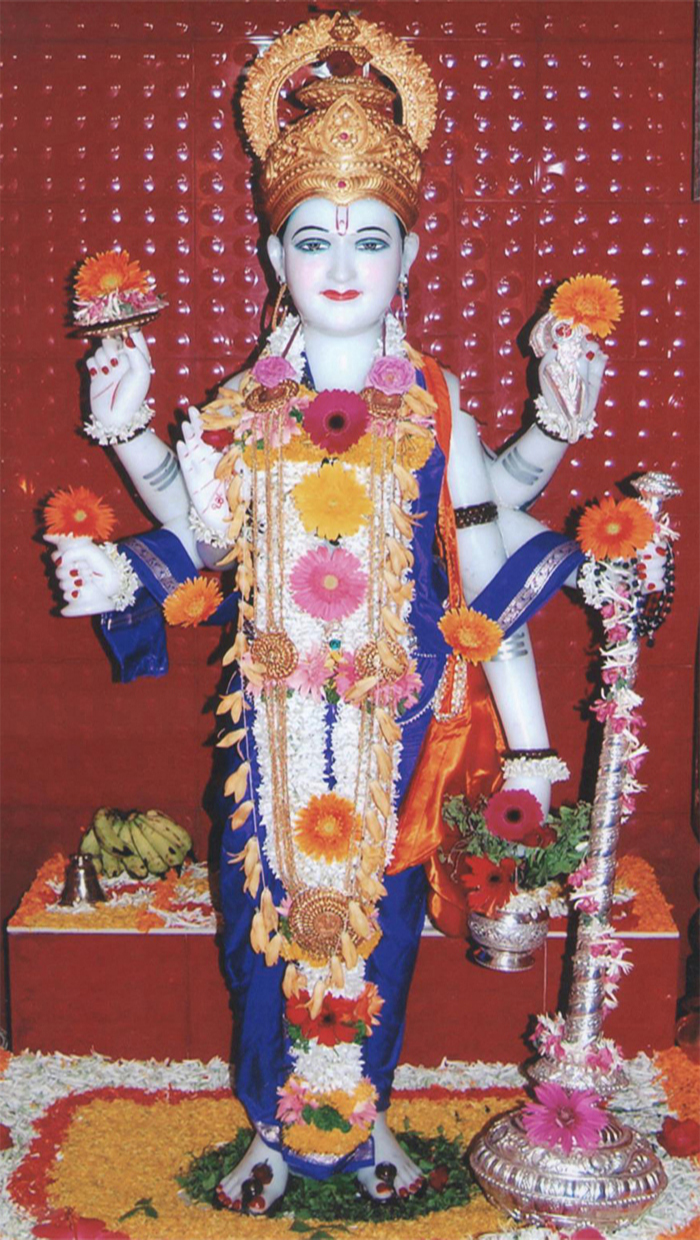
Dattatreya is typically shown with three heads and six hands, while very few show him with one head and four hands. Left: Icon with three heads; Right: with one head.

Dattatreya is typically shown with three heads and six hands, one head each for Brahma, Vishnu and Shiva who represent the Trimurti, the three main gods in Hinduism, and one pair of hands holding the symbolic items associated with each of these gods: Japamala and Kamandalu of Brahma, Shakha and Sudarshana Chakra of Vishnu, Trishula and Damaru of Shiva. He is typically dressed as a simple monk, situated in a forest or wilderness suggestive of his renunciation of worldly goods and pursuit of a meditative yogic lifestyle. In paintings and some large carvings, he is surrounded by four dogs and a cow, which symbolise the four Vedas and mother earth who nourishes all living beings.

In very few older medieval temples of Dattatreya show him with just one head, such as the one in Mahur, one at Narayanpur on Pune Satara Road, Near Pune, and another in Pandharpur, both in southern Maharashtra. Very few texts such as Agni Purana describe the architectural features for building murti, and for Dattatreya, it recommends him with one head and two hands. In Varanasi, Nepal, north Himalayan foothill states of India, 15th-century Nath temples of Dattatreya show him with just one face. In most parts of India and world, the syncretic six armed and three faced iconography is more common.

He is the motif of the '"honey bee" Yogin who has realized advaita knowledge. Dattatreya as the archetypal model of syncretism:

Furthermore, the unfolding of the Dattātreya icon illustrates the development of Yoga as a synthetic and inclusive body of ideologies and practices. Although fundamentally a jñāna-mūrti, Dattātreya is a "honey bee" Yogin: one whose character and teachings are developed by gathering varieties of Yoga's flowers. For all religious groups whose propensity it is to include ideas, practices, and teaching from the ocean of traditions, Dattātreya is truly a paradigm.

— Antonio Rigopoulos, Dattātreya: the immortal guru, yogin, and avatāra

Another distinctive aspect of Dattatreya iconography is that it includes four dogs and a cow. The four dogs represent the Vedas, as trustworthy all-weather friends, company and guardians, while the cow is a metaphor for mother earth who silently and always provides nourishment.

=== Alternate iconography ===
Dattatreya's sculptures with alternate iconography have been identified in 1st millennium CE cave temples and archaeological sites related to Hinduism. For example, in the Badami temple (Karnataka), Dattatreya is shown to be with single head and four hands like Vishnu, but seated in a serene Yoga posture (padmasana). Carved with him are the emblems (lañchana) of the Trimurti, namely the swan of Brahma, the Garuda of Vishnu and the Nandi of Shiva. The right earlobe jewelry and hair decoration in this art work of Dattatreya is of Shiva, but on his left the details are those of Vishnu. Rigopoulos dates this Badami sculpture to be from the 10th to 12th century.

A sculpture similar to Badami, but with some differences, has been discovered in Ajmer (Rajasthan). The Ajmer art work is a free statue where Dattatreya is standing, has one head and four hands. In his various hands, he carries a Trishula of Shiva, a Chakra of Vishnu, a Kamandalu of Brahma, and a rosary common to all three. Like the Badami relief work, the Ajmer iconography of Dattatreya shows the swan of Brahma, the Garuda of Vishnu and the Nandi of Shiva carved on the pedestal with him.

Some scholars such as James Harle and TA Gopinatha Rao consider iconography that presents Brahma-Vishnu-Shiva together as Hari Hara Pitamaha to be synonymous with or equivalent to Dattatreya. Antonio Rigopoulos questions this identification, and suggests that Harihara Pitamaha iconography may have been a prelude to and something that evolved into Dattatreya iconography.

=== Symbolism ===
Always be learning

The investigators of the true nature of the world are uplifted by their own efforts in this world. The self is the infallible guide of the self: through direct perception and through analogy one can work out one's salvation.

— Dattatreya, Bhagavata Purana XI.7
Translated by Klaus Klostermaier

The historic Indian literature has interpreted the representation of Dattatreya symbolically. His three heads are symbols of the Gunas (qualities in Samkhya school of Hinduism). The three Gunas are Sattva, Rajas and Tamas. The six hands have ethical symbolism, namely Yamas, Niyama, Sama, Dama, Daya and Shanti (axiology in Yoga and Vedanta school of Hinduism).

The Kamadhenu cow is symbolic Panchabutas, the four dogs are inner forces of a human being: Iccha, Vasana, Asha and Trishna. In these interpretations, Dattatreya is that yogi Guru (teacher) who has perfected all these, rules them rather than is ruled by them, and is thus the Guru Dattatreya is beyond them.

== Texts ==
The Dattatreya Upanishad (tantra-focussed), Darshana Upanishad (yoga-focussed) and particularly the Avadhuta Upanishad (advaita-focussed) present the philosophy of the Dattatreya tradition. Dattatreya is also mentioned in the classic text on Yoga, the Shandilya Upanishad.

Other Upanishads where Dattatreya's name appears in lists of ancient Hindu monks revered for their insights on renunciation are Jabala Upanishad, Naradaparivrajaka Upanishad, Bhikshuka Upanishad and Yajnavalkya Upanishad. Of these, his mention in the Jabala Upanishad is chronologically significant because this ancient text is dated to have been complete between the 3rd century BCE and 3rd century CE.

Tripura Rahasya is also an important ancient text attributed to Dattatreya.

Dattatreya is mentioned in the Mahabharata

Dattatreya is mentioned in the ancient chapter 9 of the Sattvata Samhita and chapter 5 of the Ahirbudhnya Samhita, both among the oldest layer of texts in the Vaishnava Agama tradition (Pancaratra). Schrader states these texts and the chronology of Dattatreya are older than the Mahabharata, but Rigopoulos disagrees with him on the chronology.

In the Hindu tradition, Dattatreya is the author of Avadhuta Gita, or the "Song of the free". The text's poetry is based on the principles of Advaita Vedanta, one of the subschools of Hindu philosophy.

The extant manuscripts have been dated to approximately the 9th or 10th century, but it may have existed earlier as part of an oral tradition. It consists of 289 shlokas (metered verses), divided into eight chapters.

P.P. Vasudevanand Saraswati Tembe Swami Maharaj has written an extensive literature on Lord Dattatreya and his incarnations including Sripada Srivallabha of Pithapur, Andhra Pradesh and Shri Nrusimhsaraswati Swami Maharaj of Ganagapur, Karnataka.

== Dattatreya traditions ==
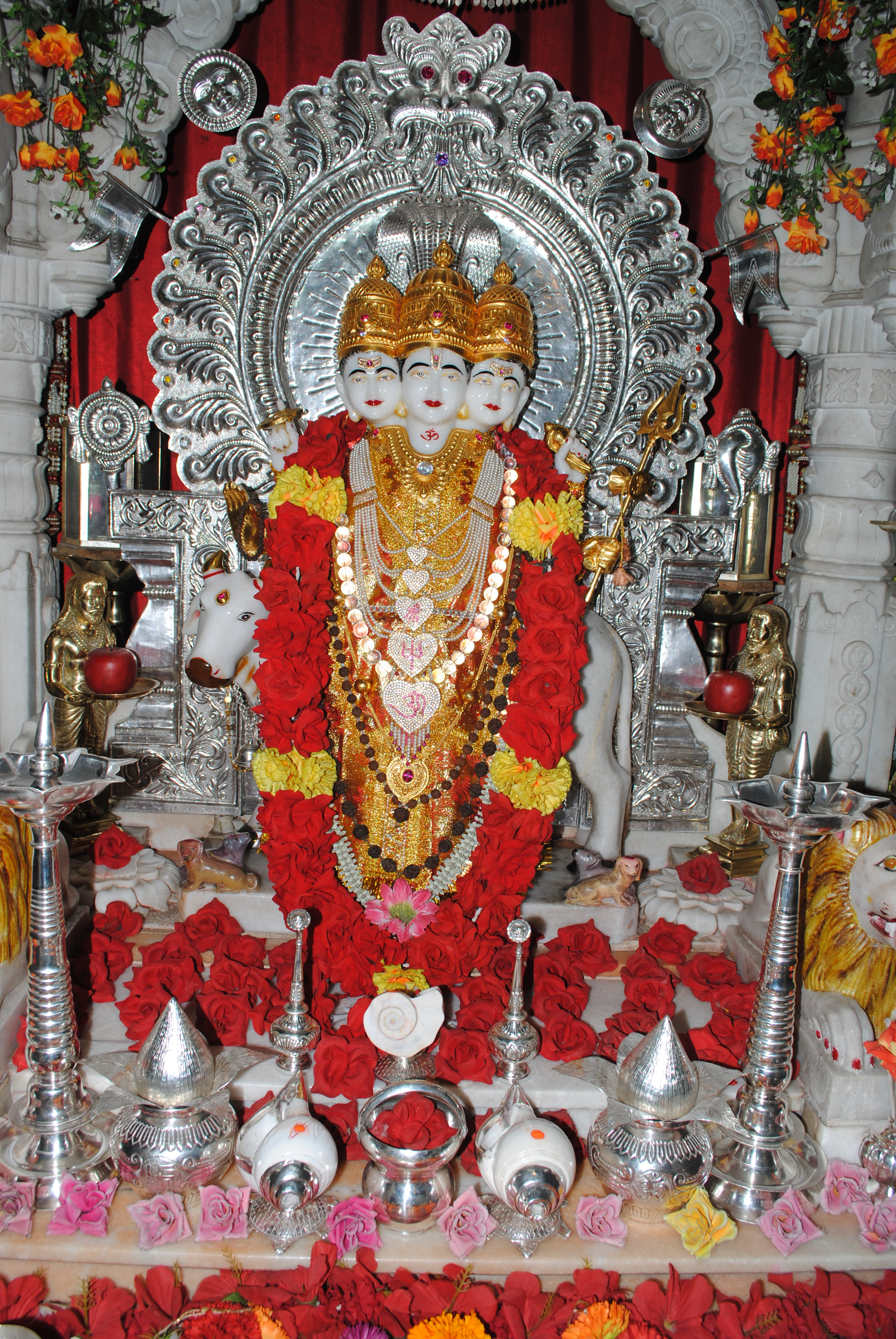
Lord Dattatreya Idol in Maharashtra

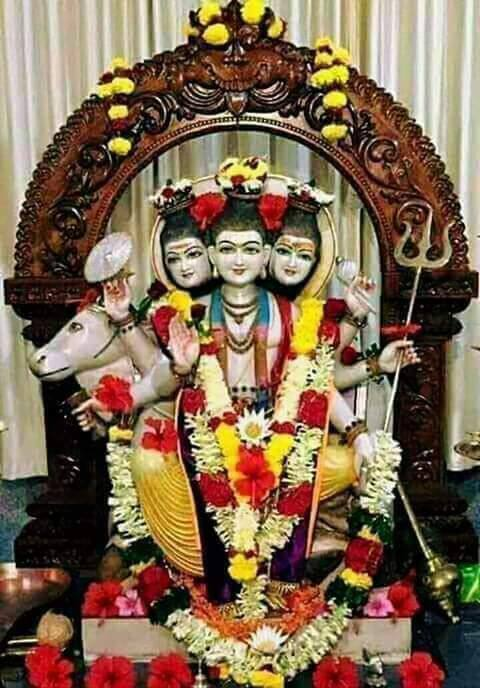
Murti of Dattatreya

Several Hindu monastic and yoga traditions are linked to Dattatreya:

- Nath sampradaya: The Nath yogis, that metamorphosed into a warrior ascetic group, consider Dattatreya as their theological founder. This group grew and became particularly prominent during the Islamic invasions and Hindu-Muslim wars in South Asia, from about the 14th to 18th century, although the Dattatreya roots of the peaceful Nath yogis go back to about the 10th century. The group was most active in Rajasthan, Gujarat, Maharashtra, Madhya Pradesh, Uttar Pradesh and Nepal. The tradition believes that the legendary Nath sampradaya yogi and Hatha Yoga innovator Gorakshanath was inspired and shaped by Dattatreya. Regional efforts and texts of the Nath tradition such as Yogi sampradaya vishkriti discussed Dattatreya.
- Avadhuta sampradaya: The nine Narayanas of the Avadhuta sampradaya are attributed to Dattatreya, an idea also found in the Natha sampradaya. A panth started by Pantmaharaj Balekundrikar of Balekundri near Belgavi is related to this. Also a saint named Shri Prabhakar Keshavrao motiwale follows the same path from years, and also Datt sampradaya is followed in his ashram located at Kanadia, Indore (Madhya Pradesh).
- Dasanami sampradaya and Shakti pithas: Dattatreya is revered in Dasanami and goddess-oriented Shaktism traditions.
- Bhakti traditions: Dattatetreya's theology emphasizing simple life, kindness to all, questioning the status quo, self pursuit of knowledge and seeking spiritual meaning of life appealed to Bhakti sant-poets of Hinduism such as Tukaram and Eknath, during an era of political and social upheaval caused by Islamic invasion in the Deccan region of India. They reverentially mentioned Dattatreya in their poems. The use of his symbolism was one of the many syncretic themes of this period where the ideas of Vaishnavism and Shaivism holistically fused in popular imagination.
- Mahanubhava tradition: Along with Krishna, the Mahanubhava tradition considers Dattatreya as their divine inspiration. The Mahanubhava Panth, propagated by Sri Chakradhar Swami, has five Krishnas, of which Dattatreya is one as their Adi Guru (the original Guru), as well as the early teachers in their tradition (Chakradhar, Gundam, Changdev). They worship Dattatreya as single headed with two arms. He has a temple dedicated in Mahur by this tradition.
- Gurucharitra tradition: This tradition is named after the Marathi text Gurucharitra consisting of 51 chapters, containing the life stories of 14th-century Datta Avatar Sripada Srivallabha and 15th-century Datta Avatar Narasimha Saraswati. The text was composed by Sarasvati Gangadhara, consists of three sections called Jnanakanda (chapters 1–24), Karmakanda (25–37) and Bhaktikanda (38–51), and is considered a sacred mantra-filled text in the Gurucharita tradition in parts of Maharashtra, north Karnataka and Gujarat. Ganagapur in kalaburagi north Karnataka is an important pilgrimage center in this tradition.
- Manik Prabhu (Sakalamata) Sampradaya: In this tradition, Dattatreya is worshipped with his Shakti, known as Madhumati. This tradition was started by the 19th century saint Shri Manik Prabhu, who is considered an Avatar of Dattatreya. Manik Nagar is the spiritual headquarters of this Sampradaya. Shri Manik Prabhu also established a Guru Parampara at Maniknagar for the spiritual guidance of devotees. Shri Manik Prabhu and his successors have written many abhangas and bhajans in Marathi and Kannada in praise of lord Dattatreya which are regularly sung at Manik Nagar.
- Lal Padris: another Hindu yogi group from western India with roots in the 10th-century and with ideas similar to Nath and Kanphata sampradaya, traces Dattatreya as the basis of their spiritual ideas.
- Around 1550 CE, Dattatreya Yogi taught the Dattatreya philosophy to his disciple Das Gosavi in Marathi. Das Gosavi then taught this philosophy to his two Telugu disciples Gopalbhatt and Sarvaved who studied and translated Das Gosavi's book of Vedantavyavaharsangraha into Telugu language. According to Prof. R. C. Dhere, Dattatreya Yogi and Das Gosavi are the original gurus in the Telugu Dattatreya tradition. Prof. Venkata Rao states that Dattatreya Shatakamu was written by Paramanandateertha who is equally important in his contributions to the Telugu tradition of Dattatreya. He was a proponent of Advaita philosophy and dedicated his two epics, Anubhavadarpanamu and Shivadnyanamanjari to Shri Dattatreya. His famous Vivekachintamani book was translated into Kannada by Nijashivagunayogi and Lingayat saint Shanatalingaswami translated this into Marathi.

== Incarnation of Dattatreya ==
- Shripad Vallabh
- Nrisimha Saraswati
- Swami Samarth
- Gagangiri Maharaj
- Manik Prabhu
- Gajanan Maharaj
- Sai Baba of Shirdi
- Shreedhar Swami
- Pant maharaj
- Sri Sri Sri Ganapathi Sachidananda Swamiji
- Sri Paramahamsa Sadguru SriSatUpasi

== See also ==
- Advaita Vedanta
- Bhedabheda
- Dattatreya Yoga Shastra
- Dvaita Vedanta
- Upanishads
- Triglav
- Chidambara Swamy of Srikshretra Sri chidambarashrama, gubbi, Karnataka
