= Manik Prabhu =

Indian Hindu saint, philosopher, poet and guru

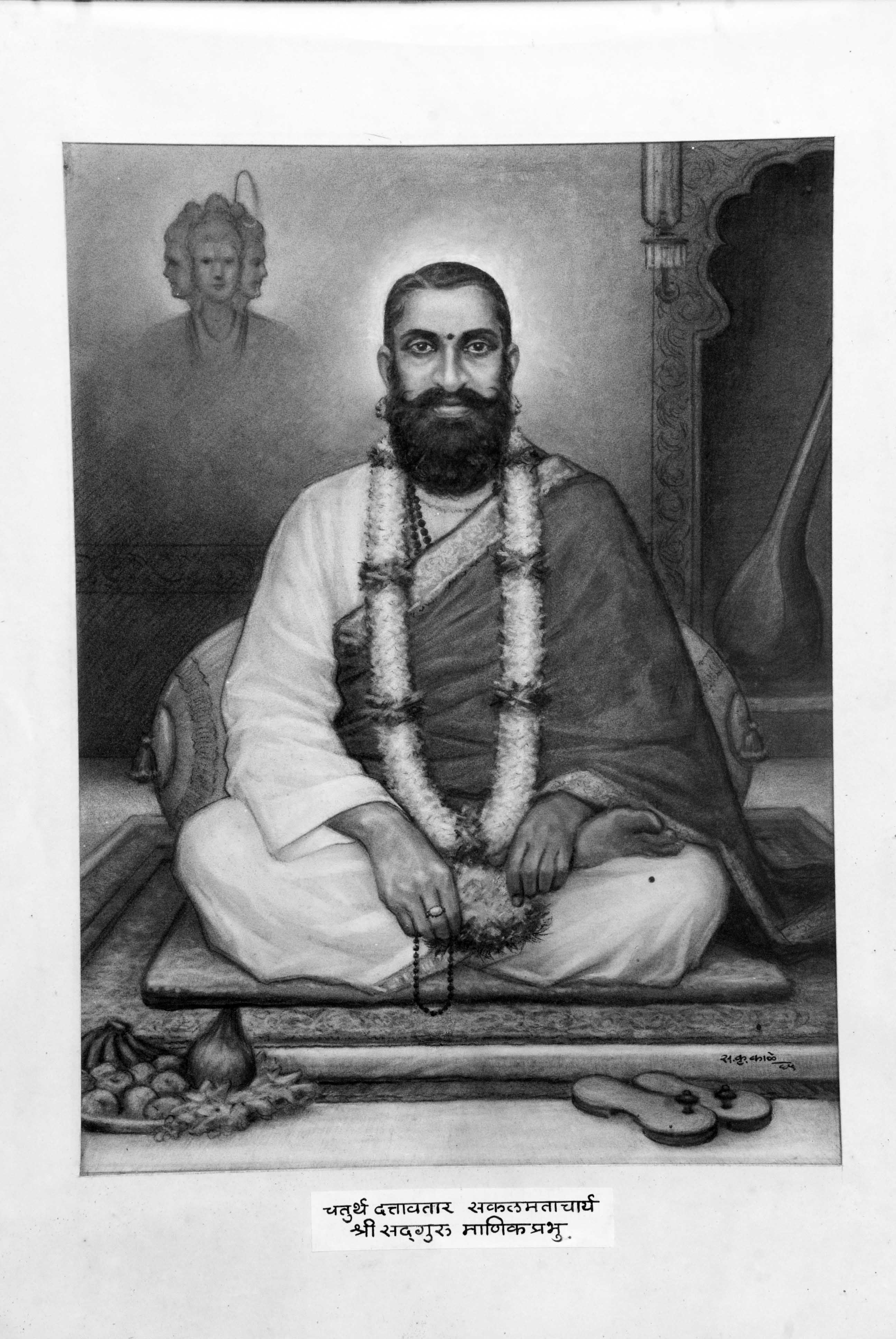
- A painting of Manik Prabhu

Personal life
- Born: Manik Prabhu; 22 December 1817 Ladwanti, Basavakalyan
- Died: 29 November 1865 (aged 47) Manik Nagar
- Resting place: Manik Nagar
- Parents: Manohar Naik (father); Baya Devi (mother)

Religious life
- Religion: Hinduism
- Founder of: Sakalamata Sampradaya
- Philosophy: Advaita Vedanta
- Sect: Sakalamata Sampradaya, Datta Sampradaya

Manik Prabhu Maharaj was an Indian Hindu saint, freedom fighter, philosopher, poet and guru. He is also regarded as an incarnation of Dattatreya by the people of Datta Sampraday. Prabhu's philosophy, the Sakala mata Siddhanta rests on the principles of Advaita Vedanta as propagated by Adi Sankara. Shri Prabhu strongly advocated the essential oneness of all religions. Prabhu's Muslim devotees revered him as an incarnation of Mehboob Subhani whereas his Lingayat devotees saw him as a form of Basavanna. Shri Prabhu composed numerous bhajans and padas in various languages such as Marathi, Kannada, Hindi, Urdu and Sanskrit. Shri Prabhu was also associated with the First War of Indian Independence in 1857. Shri Sai Baba of Shirdi, Shri Swami Samarth of Akkalkot, Shri Bramhachaitanya of Gondavale and many other contemporary saints are believed to have visited Maniknagar to interact with Prabhu on matters of deep spiritual wisdom. Biographers refer to Shri Prabhu as a saint of great spirituality and mysticism. Shri Prabhu's teachings emphasize the path of Bhakti. He also moralized on the vedantic truths concerning the spiritual unity of beings. Manik Nagar, Humnabad, Bidar District is the place where he took sanjeevani samadhi. Shri Prabhu's samadhi at Maniknagar is the nucleus of Manik Nagar and acts as the spiritual center of the activities of Shri Manik Prabhu Samsthan.

== Birth and early life ==
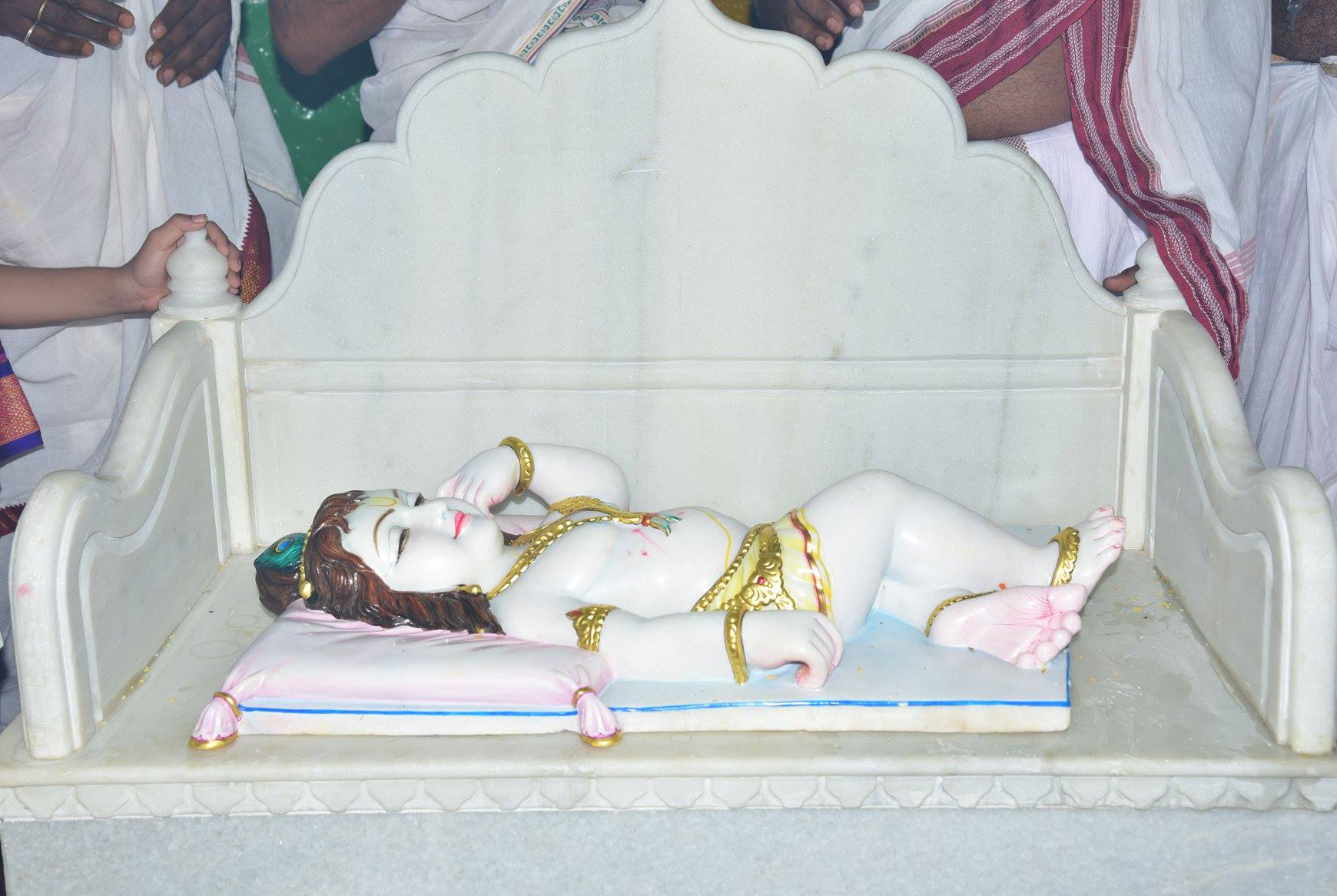
Manik Prabhu's Baala Roopa Murti at his birthplace Ladawanti. The Manika Prabhu Mandir at Ladawanti is located on the exact place where Shri Prabhu was born.

Manika Prabhu was born into Deshastha Rigvedi Bramhin family of Srivatsa gotra on 22 December 1817 (Margashirsha Pournima - Datta Jayanti, Shaka 1739 Eashwara naama Samvatsara) in his grandmother's native Ladwanti near Basavakalyana (now in the Bidar district of Karnataka). His father was named Manohara Naik and his mother Baya Devi. It is said that his parents, who celebrated Rama Navmi every year, had a divine vision of Lord Dattatreya on the Ram Navami of 1817 before Prabhu's birth. It is believed that Dattatreya assured Manohar and Baya that he himself would take birth as their child on Datta Jayanti. Prabhu had an elder brother called Dadasaheb, a younger brother called Tatya Saheb and a sister called Chimanabai. Prabhu lost his father at an early age and thus grew up under the guardianship of his maternal uncle Shri Balwantrao Apparao Kulkarni, who was employed with the Nawab of Basavakalyana.

While at Basavakalyana, he started collecting a group of his friends and roaming the hills and dales in the vicinity of the town. Young Manik behaved in such a carefree manner that the members of his family were concerned. He used to roam in the forests for days at a stretch and not return home, which led to the people of Basavakalyana calling him veda bhau (mad child). He never went to school and did not receive any formal education despite attempts by his family members. His childhood friends claimed that he performed many miracles in the jungles while they were playing together. On one occasion, his friend Govinda did not turn up for play. When he reached Govinda's house, he saw that Govinda had died due to snake bite and all his family members were mourning. Prabhu is believed to have miraculously brought Govinda back to life by his devotees. On another occasion, he is said to have given Darshan to Kalambhatta in the divine form of Lord Shiva. From early in his childhood, Prabhu's fame as an Avatari Purusha quickly spread in the erstwhile Hyderabad state and beyond. His devotees have documented many such stories in which Prabhu solved the problems of his devotees, fulfilled people's wishes and helped common people in distress. He stayed with Bhalachandra Dikshit of Hallikhed (a Vedic Pundit) for a few months to learn some Vedic rites and rituals.

As he grew older, his uncle tried to formally educate him, thinking that education would make him a breadwinner for the family, but in vain. On a hot summer afternoon, when Prabhu was taking a royal siesta on his uncle's bed, he got a strong reprimand from his uncle. This was reason enough for Prabhu to renounce all worldly ties and leave his hometown for his chosen mission. He composed his first pada or bhajan 'प्रभूविण कोण कुणाचा वाली' after leaving home.

== Travel and Pilgrimage ==
After leaving home, Prabhu stayed and performed penance at Amrutkund - a holy place in the jungles near Manthal for six months. Devotees believe that Bhagawan Dattatreya, disguised as a Bairagi once visited Prabhu at Amritkund and gave him Danda, Deeksha and Jholi, mandating his future journey as a wandering yogi and an itinerant messenger of truth. From here, he started travelling and visiting places of religious importance in the region. According to a legend, he once arrived at Chalakapur, a small village near Bidar during his wanderings. The sun had already set and he had no place to stay at night. On the outskirts of the village, he saw a temple dedicated to Hanuman. The people of this village did not visit this temple after nightfall due to the fear of dacoits, thieves and wild animals. Prabhu arrived at this temple and planned to stay there for the night. He packed his clothes and other belongings in a cloth and safely deposited them on Shri Hanuman's Moorthi before sleeping in a corner of the temple. Next morning, the poojari (priest) arrived and was enraged to see that a young person had kept his belongings on the holy idol's shoulders. He woke Shri Prabhu up and asked him why he had done so. Prabhu said "He who takes care of the whole world can easily take care of my belongings in this desolate place, therefore I kept it with the lord". The poojari's anger knew no bounds and he started beating Shri Prabhu with a stick. It is believed that blood started oozing out of the Hanuman idol when the poojari beat Prabhu. Seeing wounds appearing on Hanuman's idol, the poojari thought that Prabhu must be none other than Hanuman in human form and begged for his forgiveness. Prabhu forgave him and asked him never to be harsh with devotees. He stayed at Chalakapur for a few months and people started flocking to him for his darshan. He arrived at Mailar near Bidar after leaving Chalakapur. It his here that he met Devi Venkamma or Madhumati Shyamala, his disciple (a yogini revered as a devi by Shri Manik Prabhu's devotees), for the first time. Prabhu stayed at Mailar for a few months and like Chalakapur, thousands of people started gathering to catch a glimpse of Shri Prabhu. After leaving Mailar, Prabhu proceeded to Bhalki. Prabhu is said to have performed penance in the jungles near Bhalki. Some accounts suggest that Prabhu taught Devi Venkamma samadhi and yoga in the jungles there. He then visited Chitguppa where he is said to have given darshan to his devotees in the divine form of Lord Basaveshwara.

Prabhu sent all his followers and shishyas to Kalyan and then set out for his spiritual journey across the country. Prabhu travelled on foot as a wandering yogi across the length and breadth of the country covering places of religious importance such as Varanasi, Haridwar, Mathura, Badri, Puri, Dwarka, Girnar, Tirupati and Rameshwaram. Some of his Muslim devotees believe that he visited the shrine of Mehboob Subhani in Baghdad (Iraq) during his travels in North India. Prabhu also visited Pandharpur, Tuljapur, Ganagapur, Kolhapur and other major temples of the Deccan region. According to Ganesh Raghunath Kulkarni (Prabhu's official biographer), the river Chandrabhaga was flooded when he visited Pandharpur. Prabhu's devotees believe that Panduranga himself came in the form of a boatman and took Prabhu to the other side of the river and then disappeared. When he visited the Vitthala Temple, he had worn dirty and torn clothes. The pundits thought that he was a beggar and denied him entry to the temple. When he tried to forcefully enter the temple, the pundits beat him. It is believed that a floral garland came from Panduranga's idol and fell on Shri Prabhu. The pundits realised that Prabhu was a divine being and begged him for forgiveness. Prabhu took Lord Vitthala's darshan and stayed at Pandharpur for many days. While describing his Pandharpur visit, Prabhu himself says in an abhanga (poem), 'कडकडोनि माणिकदास विट्ठलासी भेटले'. During his countrywide travel, he composed numerous bhajans in praise of various deities in Marathi, Kannada, Hindi, Urdu and Sanskrit. These bhajans and abhangas are compiled in a book called Padyamala. Prabhu also visited the Gottamgotti forest, Ketaki Sangam and Nyalkal among other places when he came back to his native land. The devotees of Bidar invited Prabhu to visit Bidar. On the way there, it is said that a yogi came in the form of a snake and led Prabhu to Jharani Narasimha cave. Prabhu's ancestors had performed penance at Jharani Narasimha. People of the Bidar region started to flock to Jharni for Prabhu's darshan. Devotees of Bidar invited Prabhu to visit their homes. Prabhu assured everyone that he would visit their house at 12 noon the following day. According to Ganesh Raghunath Kulkarni, Prabhu is believed to have visited every devotee's home at the same time in a miraculous example of multilocation. According to the same account, when Muslim residents of Bidar tried to test him by giving him meat and wine for lunch, Prabhu is believed to have converted them into fruits and milk. Prabhu's devotees ascribe many such miracles to him.

== Maniknagar ==
=== Establishment of Maniknagar ===
After completing his spiritual journey across the country, Prabhu finally decided to settle on the banks of the rivulets Viraja and Guruganga in the year 1845 which later came to be known as Maniknagar (a place near Humnabad in Bidar District of Karnataka). He was on his way back to Kalyan when his palkhi or palanquin got stuck in the jungle near Humnabad. Prabhu liked the area and decided to make it his permanent abode and also a center for the propagation of his philosophy of sakalamata siddhanta. Prabhu stayed in a simple hut and ate only the madhukari bhiksha (alms) which his disciples would bring from the nearby villages. Usually, he dressed in very simple clothes and occasionally he even dressed in royal attire. Manik Prabhu established the gaadi (spiritual seat) of Lord Dattatreya in the very hut where he used to reside. This gaadi is a symbol of Nirguna Bramha. He did not place any idol or spiritual icon on the gaadi and instead kept it empty. The idea behind it was that his devotees could visualise the parabrahma (supreme reality) in whatever form they liked and worship him accordingly. Initially When Prabhu made Maniknagar his abode, only his disciples and some bramhacharis stayed in small huts. Later on, Prabhu allowed people from all walks of life to stay at Maniknagar and the population started increasing steadily. Prabhu's mother Baya Devi and his brothers Tatya Saheb and Dada Saheb also came and settled in Maniknagar with their family.

=== Prabhu Darbar ===
The name and fame of Manik Prabhu spread quickly and people of all religions, sects and communities started flocking to Maniknagar. Prabhu used to hold a gathering everyday called darbar where thousands of people visited him and sought his blessings. Prabhu guided his devotees in spiritual matters and helped them overcome their material difficulties. Prabhu gave khairaat or alms to the needy and the poor. Hundreds of Vedic scholars, Fakeers, jangams and other mendicants came to Maniknagar to receive blessings and khairaat from Prabhu. It is said that leading musicians and artists of the time came to Maniknagar to perform seva, selfless service, in Prabhu's darbar. He was equally revered by all communities; while his Muslim followers thought him to be an incarnation of Mehboob Subhani (the Sufi saint of Baghdad), his Lingayat devotees would worship him as Lord Basaveshwara and his Sikh followers saw him as in the form of Guru Nanak. It is said that the fifth Nizam of Hyderabad, Mir Afzaluddaula sent his courtier Yashwantrao Arab to seek Shri Prabhu's blessings. Prabhu declined the jagir or lands offered by the king and said, "The whole earth belongs to my lord, Datta Prabhu". He sent Prasada to the Nizam Afzaluddaula. Some devotees believe that the Nizam's son Mehboob Ali (the sixth Nizam) was named by Shri Manik Prabhu. Prabhu conducted a mahayajna (Vedic sacrifice) called sarvatomukha at Maniknagar. Leading scholars of the time are said to have attended this yajna and sought Shri Prabhu's blessings. Prabhu celebrated Datta Jaynti Utsav every year at Maniknagar in a grand manner.

Stories of his miracles and eyewitness accounts, which bear testimony to the manner in which he brought succor to the distressed and the sorrowing, to the afflicted and the wronged, who, ardently and with deep faith and devotion sought his spiritual intervention are available. He never claimed credit for any such incident and always said that it is "Datta Prabhu's leela". He is also believed to have given darshan to a devotee in the divine form of Goddess Tulaja Bhavani and accepted the devotee's offerings. Many such stories are compiled in the official biography of Shri Manik Prabhu by Ganesh Raghunath Kulkarni.

=== Visits of spiritual personalities ===
Shri Swami Samarth is also believed to have visited Prabhu before settling at Akkalkot. According to Shri Manik Prabhu Charitra, Swami Maharaj stayed at Maniknagar for six months. Shri Manik Prabhu and Shri Swami Samarth used to sit under the holy audumbar tree and interact on matters of deep spiritual wisdom. Eyewitness accounts suggest that Shri Swami Samarth used to regard Shri Manik Prabhu as his brother.

According to Shri Achyut Yashwant Dhond, Shri Sai Baba of Shirdi visited Prabhu as a young Fakeer. According to the tale, Prabhu was sitting in his darbar when Sai Baba arrived. Sai asked Prabhu to fill his lota. Prabhu instructed Tatya Saheb, his brother who was sitting beside him, to fill the lota. Tatya was busy with some academic discussions on Vedanta and tried to fill the lota while speaking to someone else. Even after putting hundreds of coins in it, the lota would not fill. Tatya was astonished and gave it to Prabhu. Prabhu put 5 khariks (dry dates) and some flowers in it. The lota filled immediately. Sai Baba took the dates and flowers and said that this was enough for him. He poured back the coins which were many times more than the original coins put in the lota by Tatya Saheb.

Shri Bramha Chaitanya Maharaj of Gondavale also visited Prabhu at Maniknagar. The Shankaracharya of Sringeri at the time, Jagadguru Ugra Narasimha Bharati Swamiji paid a visit to Maniknagar during Prabhu's time. Prabhu welcomed the Shankaracharya with due honours and the Shankaracharya appreciated Prabhu's noble work.

=== Prabhu and the revolt of 1857 ===
According to Ganesh Raghunath Kulkarni, Nanasaheb Peshwa of Bithur sent a letter to Prabhu seeking his blessings, guidance and support in 1857. A person called Rangrao carried Nanasaheb's letter to Prabhu. Prabhu gave prasada (dry dates) and some money to Rangrao for the national movement. Prabhu reportedly said to Rangrao, "Tell Nanasaheb that he has my support and blessings. There is a lot of time for the fulfillment of the goal (independence), but don't stop the efforts. Datta Prabhu will definitely bless you all". Prabhu gave yoga dandas or divine sticks to his followers and said that "these sticks will protect you from the dangers of the war". After the uprising, Prabhu took all the yoga dandas back and they are stored in a room at Maniknagar today.

== Sanjivani Mahasamadhi ==
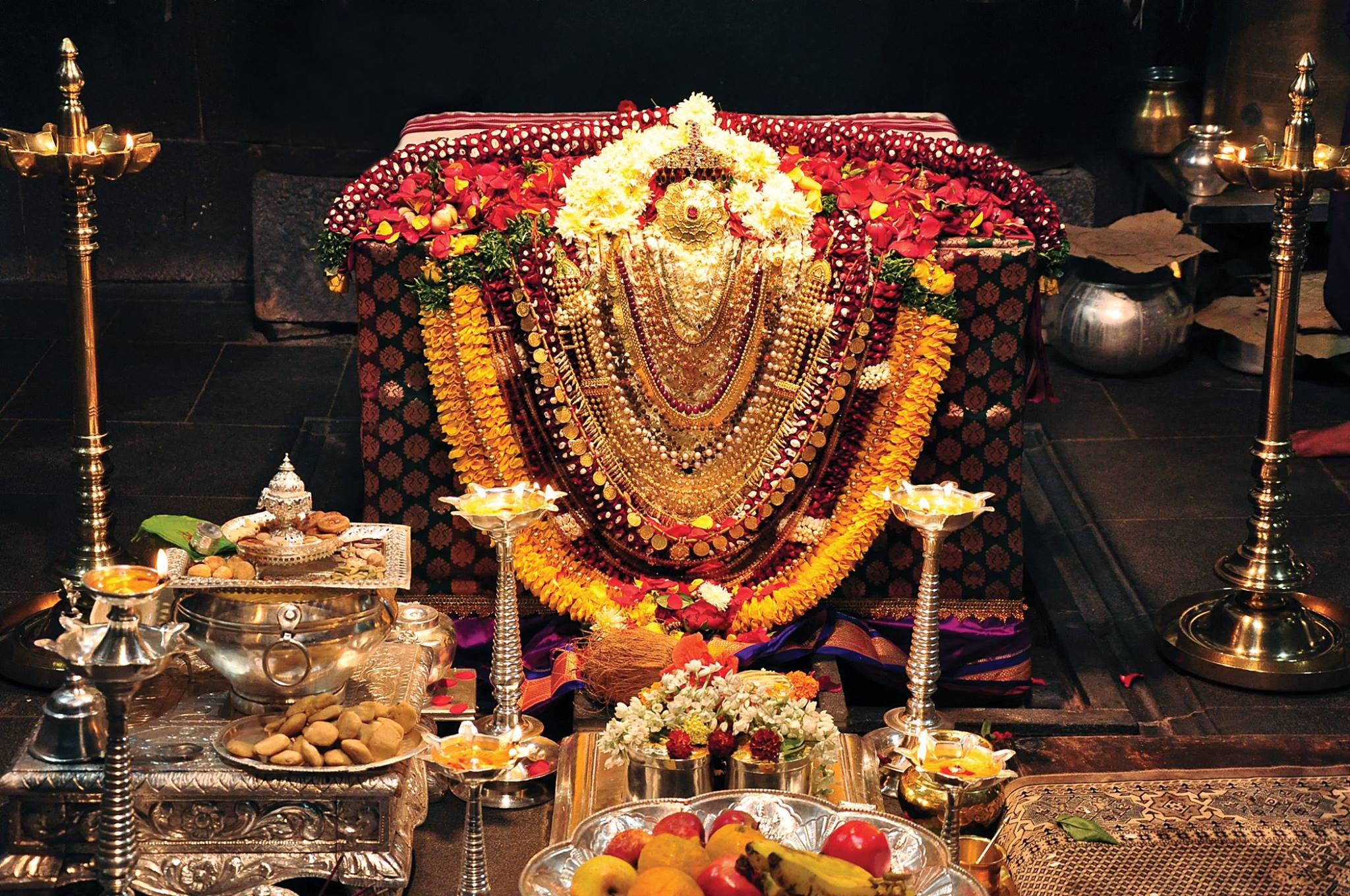
Shri Manik Prabhu's Sanjivani Mahasamadhi at Maniknagar.

In 1865, Prabhu felt that it was time for him to take mahasamadhi. Both of his brothers, Dadasaheb and Tatyasaheb, and his mother Baya Devi had died before Prabhu's mahasamadhi. Devi Venkamma too attained samadhi a couple of years before Shri Prabhu. Prabhu decided the holy day Mokshada Ekadashi (Geeta Jayanti - Margashirsha Shuddha Ekadashi, Shaka 1787), Tuesday 29 November 1865 would be the ideal date for mahasamadhi. He instructed his close aides to construct a walled pit in his hut but under total secrecy. His plan was known only to 4 or 5 of his close disciples. The annual Datta Jayanti Utsav had already begun. On the night of Dashami (28 Nov 1865), Prabhu distributed khairaat (alms) to Fakeers and the poor as coincidentally it was the day of Gyarahvi Shareef (anniversary of the death of Mehboob Subhani, famous Sufi saint of Baghdad).

On the early morning of Ekadashi, Prabhu retired to his hut and took sanyasa deeksha according to the scriptures under total secrecy. He called both of his nephews, Manohara and Martanda to the hut and accepted their pooja. Prabhu gave the mantra deeksha and kharik prasada / Karjura or Uttatti to his elder nephew Manohara Prabhu and appointed him as the successor to his holy peetha. Then he sat in the pit of the samadhi and asked his aides to close the pit from all sides. Prabhu attained Sanjivani samadhi, a state of meditative blissful consciousness. Eyewitness accounts suggest that Prabhu left his physical body by the yogic way of Samadhi on the evening of Ekadashi around 5 PM. Prabhu's devotees believe that he is sitting in the SANJEEVAN SAMAADHI and answering their prayers even to this day. Other examples of saints who took Sanjeevan Samadhi are Santa Dnyaneshwar of Alandi and Shri Raghavendra Swami of Mantralaya. The news of Prabhu's Samadhi was broken to the public on the day of Datta Jayanti (4 days later) after the Mahapooja and Jayanti celebrations.

== Guru Parampara ==
Maniknagar is a Datta-Peetha where a Guru-Parampara exists for the spiritual guidance of the devotees. Shri Prabhu's mission was ably carried forward by his successors who contributed in their own ways in spreading the message of Shri Prabhu and enriching and enhancing the glory of the institution established by him.

- Shri Manohar Manik Prabhu (birth: 1858, Peetharohan: 1865, Mahasamadhi: 1877), Shri Manik Prabhu's nephew, was the immediate successor to him. He became the Peethadhipati at the age of 7 years. He acquired mastery over the Sanskrit language and the scriptures and went on to lay down the Upasana Paddhati (principles of worship) of the Sakalamata Sampradaya. Like his Guru, he too composed numerous Vedantic compositions in various languages and Stotras in Sanskrit. Within a very short stint as the Peethadhipati of the Samsthan he completed the important task of construction of the Samadhi Mandir (main temple) of Shri Manik Prabhu. Like his Guru Shri Manik Prabhu, he too attained Sanjeevani Mahasamadhi.
- Shri Martand Manik Prabhu (birth: 1860, Peetharohan: 1877, Mahasamadhi:1936), younger brother of Shri Manohar Prabhu and Nephew of Shri Manik Prabhu, was the third Peethadhipati of the Samsthan. During his 60 year long stint as the head of the Samsthan, He developed the institution into an important spiritual centre. He spread Prabhu's message far and wide and a great many people came to be associated with the Samsthan, becoming his ardent disciples and continuing their devotion for generations to come. He is credited for opening the doors of Vedanta to the common man through his simple yet impactful writing, elucidating the most difficult Vedantic principles in the language of the masses. He was a prolific composer in Marathi, Urdu, Hindi, Sanskrit and Kannada. The Pundits and Scholars of Varanasi conferred on him the title of 'Abhinava Shankaracharya' for his bold and independent views on Advaita Philosophy in his magnum opus 'Gnyan Martanda'. He was also a musicologist who worked on the scientific relation of music with spirituality. Musical Stalwarts of his time such as Pandit Vishnu Digambar Paluskar and Balgandharva sought his guidance and blessings. The erstwhile Nizam of Hyderabad Mir Osman Ali Khan and the Prime Minister of Hyderabad State Maharaja Kishan Pershad Bahadur were among his followers. He toured extensively throughout the erstwhile Hyderabad, Bombay and Madras states to propagate the message of Sakalamata. He attained Mahasamadhi in the year 1936.
- Shri Shankar Manik Prabhu (birth: 1895, Peetharohan: 1936, Mahasamadhi: 1945), nephew of Shri Martand Prabhu, was the fourth Peethadhipati of the Samsthan. Before ascending the holy seat of Shri Prabhu, he served as the Secretary of the Samsthan for several years under the guidance of his Guru and maternal uncle Shri Martand Prabhu. His modern education (he was a law graduate from the Osmania University) helped him in systematizing the administrative setup of the Samsthan and giving it a modern social outlook. He started the first educational institution of Maniknagar called Manik Vidyalaya in the year 1940. His essays on Advaita Vedanta were published in some of the leading spiritual journals of his time which are today compiled in the book Dnyana Shankari. He attained Mahasamadhi in the year 1945.
- Shri Siddharaj Manik Prabhu, (birth: 1939, Peetharohan: 1945, Mahasamadhi: 2009) was the only son of Shri Shankar Manik Prabhu and the fifth successor of the Peetha. The responsibility of carrying forward Shri Prabhu's spiritual mission fell upon Shri Siddharaj Manik Prabhu at the age of 6 years. He was sent to the famous Scindia School of Gwalior for his formal education. He took over the affairs of the Samsthan after completing his school education in the year 1956. Shri Siddharaj Manik Prabhu is credited for transforming a tiny hamlet called Maniknagar into a throbbing centre of spiritual and Social activities. He toured all over the country to propagate the message of Sakalamata as propounded by Shri Prabhu. He founded a number of educational and charitable institutions at Maniknagar for the benefit of public at large. He was also a sports enthusiast who strongly believed in making games and sports an integral part of an individual's growth and development. He took special interest in Indian Classical music. Musical stalwarts such as Bharatratna Bheemsen Joshi, Bharatratna Lata Mangeshkar, Ustad Zakir Hussain and Pandit Mallikarjun Mansur among many others visited Maniknagar to seek his blessings. He composed a number of Bhajans and Abhangas in Hindi, Marathi and Kannada, which are very popular among his followers. He attained Mahasamadhi in the year 2009.
- Shri Dnyanraj Manik Prabhu (birth: 1958, Peetharohan: 2009), elder son of Shri Siddharaj Prabhu, is the present Peethadhipati of Shri Manik Prabhu Samsthan. Like his father and Guru Shri Siddharaj Prabhu, he too was sent to the Scindia School - Gwalior for his formal education. While at school, he secured the All India 1st rank for Economics in the CBSE examinations of 1975 and was awarded the 'President of India's gold medal for the Best Scindian - 1974-75' by the School. After returning from School, he took charge as the Secretary of Shri Manik Prabhu Samsthan in 1975. During his 34 year long stint as Secretary of the Samsthan, he assisted his Father in the all-round development of the Samsthan. He introduced modern technology in the administration of the Samsthan and renovated many old structures in Maniknagar. He ascended the holy Peetha of Shri Prabhu after the Mahasamadhi of his father and Guru Shri Siddharaj Prabhu in the year 2009. He is a prolific writer in Hindi, Urdu and Marathi and has composed numerous Bhajans, Kavitas, Abhangas etc. in these languages. He has studied the Upanishadas, Bhagawatgeeta and other Vedantic texts and has written a number of books on these subjects. Shri Dnyanraj Prabhu is known for his discourses on Advaita Vedanta all over the country and abroad. Many of his discourses have been aired on leading spiritual TV channels of India. He is credited for taking Shri Prabhu's message beyond the shores of India. He has been awarded the honorary D.Litt. (doctorate) by the Gulbarga University. He has also been awarded with 'Sadhana Shankar' and 'Adi Shankaracharya' awards by leading spiritual institutions of the country. He is credited for successfully organising many Mahotsavas like Shri Manik Dwishatabdi Mahotsava at Maniknagar.

== Sakalamata Sampradaya ==
The sampradaya is called sakalamata as it involves and assimilates all sects and creeds. It is not at all antagonistic to them but only means to supplement them. Shri Prabhu was considered to be a 'Raja Yogi' by his followers. This sampradaya has three types of upasanas (ways of worship). The first is 'Adhyatmic Upasana', in which Chaitanya Dev (Bramhan) is the main deity. The second is 'Adhidaivik Upasana' in which Manik Prabhu is worshiped as the fourth incarnation of lord Dattatreya. The third is 'Adhibhautik Upasana' in which Manik Prabhu is worshiped in the Sadguru roopa. The philosophy of this tradition is that there is no resistance to any kind of religious faiths in the world. All faiths are believed to give the ultimate godliness to its followers. This tradition was started by Shri Manik Prabhu of Maniknagar. There is no distinction made on the basis of caste, creed, religion or gender. The Sampradaya is firmly based on Adi Sankara's adwaita philosophy.

== Datta Jayanti ==
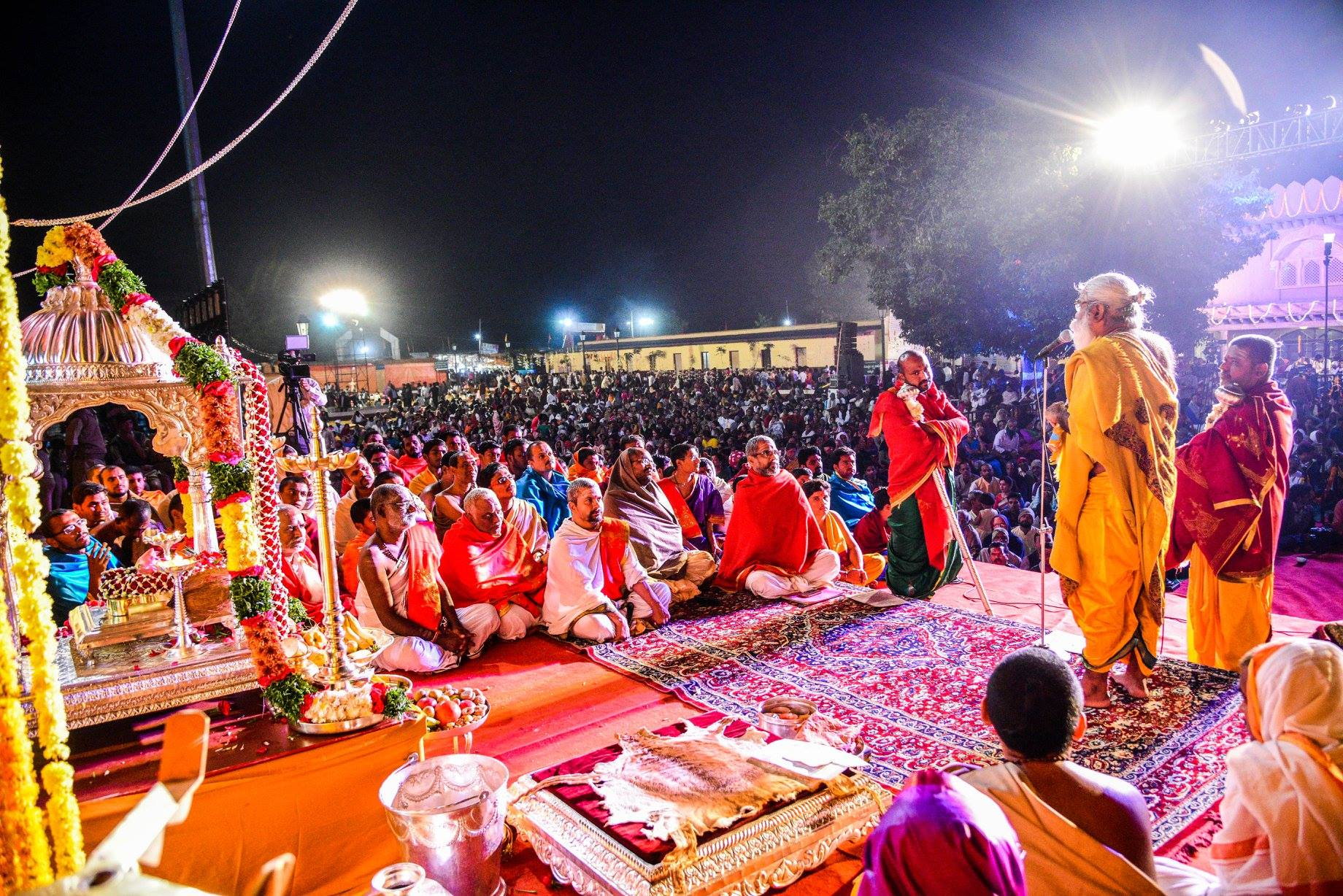
Shri Manik Prabhu Jayanti - Rajopachar Mahapooja

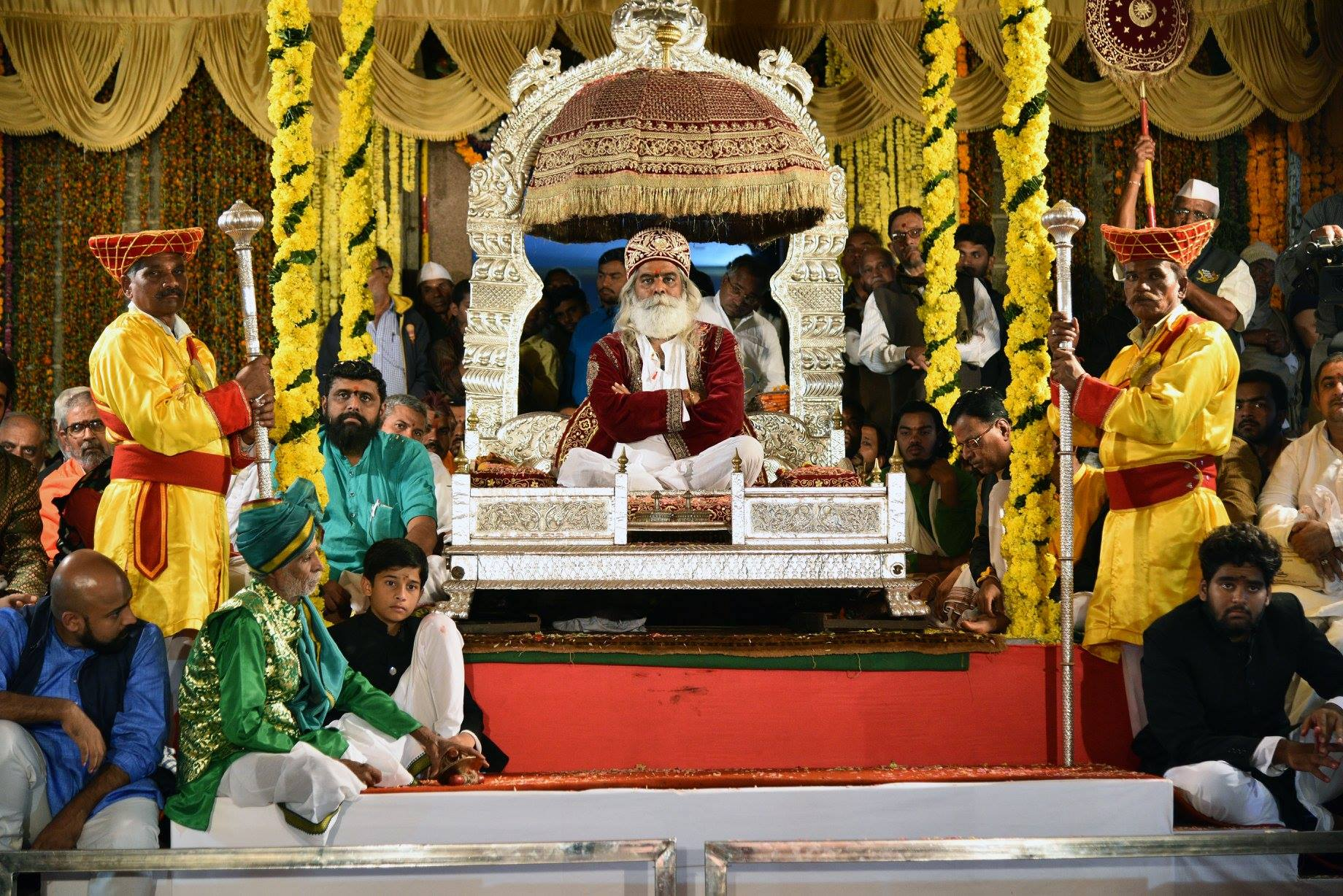
Shri Dnyanraj Manik Prabhu seated on the holy SIMHASANA of Shri Manik Prabhu on the occasion of Prabhu Darbar on the Last day of Datta Jaynti 2017.

Manik Prabhu is a saint in Datta Sampradaya who was born on Datta Jayanti (Margashirsha Pournima, Tuesday 22 December 1817). Prabhu's birth anniversary is celebrated in Manik nagar as an annual 7-day Mahotsava called Datta Jayanti mahotsava. It is a religious and cultural extravaganza in which hundreds of vedic Pundits, Musicians, Folk artists along with thousands of devotees assemble in Maniknagar to pay their tributes to the Samadhi of Manik Prabhu.

- Shri Prabhu Punyatithi: The Utsava starts with the Punyatithi of Shri Prabhu on Margasheersha Ekadashi or Gita Jayanti. Rajopachar Mahapooja and Aradhana of Shri Prabhu is performed on this day.
- Shri Prabhu Dwadashi: Viraja-Guruganga Sangam Snaan and Rajopaxhar Mahapooja to Shri Prabhu's Samadhi are performed on this day
- Dakshina Darbar or Trayodashi: Dakshina or Khairaat is given to the needy and the poor on this day.
- Guru Poojan or Chaturdashi: The Sampradayik Shishyas perform Guru Poojan to their Guru, the Peethadhipati (successor) of Shri Manik Prabhu on this day.
- Prabhu Jayanti, Datta Jayanti or Pournima: This is the main day of the Utsava. Rajopachar Mahapooja is performed to the holy Samadhi of Shri Prabhu on this day. Lakhs of devotees congregate on this day to take the Darshan of Shri Prabhu Samadhi and partake the Mahaprasada.
- Prabhu Darbar: The Utsava concludes with The Jayanti Darbar or Prabhu Darbar. This is a nightlong event. On this day, the Peethadhipati sits on the holy simhasana of Shri Manik Prabhu and gives Darshan and Prasad to the devotees while musicians and artists perform their Seva in front of the Simhasana. The Janma of Shri Prabhu is celebrated after the aarati. Thousands of devotees take Darshan and Prasada in the Darbar. A Shobhayatra is held on the next day on conclusion of the Darbar and the Utsava.

== See also ==
- Shri Manik Prabhu Devasthanam
