= Putrada Ekadashi =

Putrada Ekadashi may mean:

- Shravana Putrada Ekadashi
- Pausha Putrada Ekadashi
