= Datta Jayanti =

Hindu observance

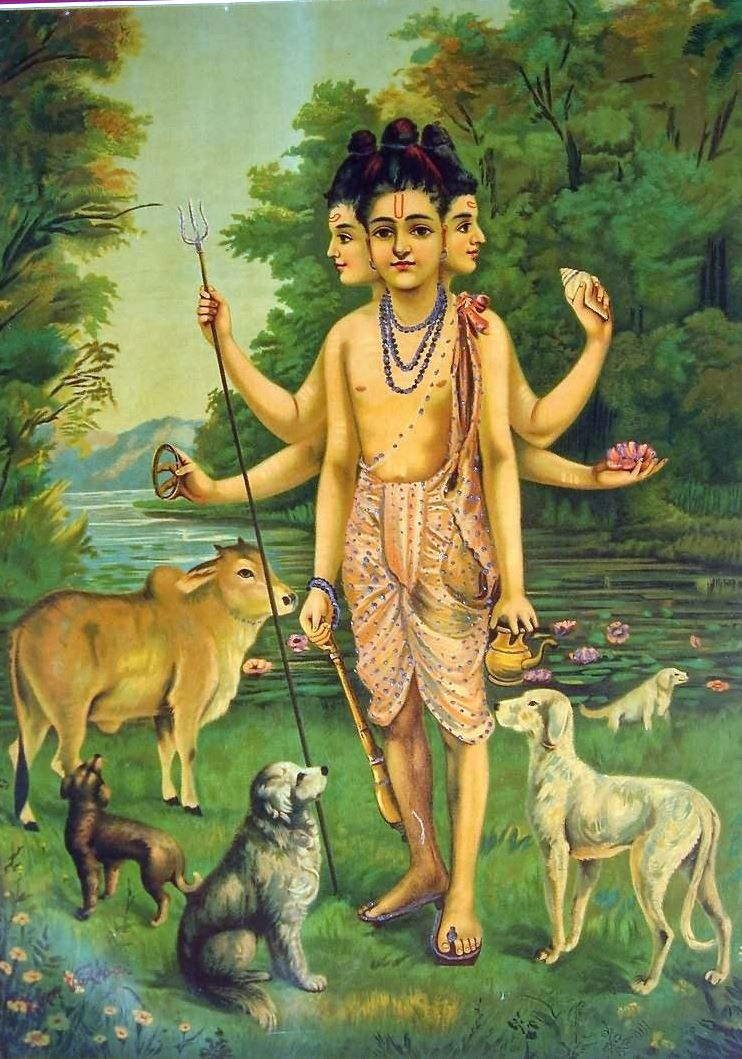
- Painting of Dattatreya, Raja Ravi Varma
- Also called: Dattatreya Jayanti
- Observed by: Prayers and religious rituals, including puja to Dattatreya
- Type: Hindu
- Significance: marks the birth anniversary of Lord Dattatreya
- Celebrations: Fasting, meditation and prayers day

Datta Jayanti, also known as Dattatreya Jayanti (Sanskrit: दत्तात्रेयजयंती, romanized: Dattātreyajayantī), is a Hindu festival, commemorating the birth of the Hindu deity Dattatreya (Datta), a combined form of the Hindu male divine trinity of Brahma, Vishnu, and Shiva.

It is celebrated on the full moon day of the Margashirsha (Agrahayana) month according to the Hindu calendar (December/January) throughout the country, and in particular in Maharashtra.

== Legend ==
Dattatreya was the son of the sage Atri and his wife Anasuya. Anasuya, an archetypal chaste and virtuous wife, did severe tapas (austerities) to beget a son equal in merits as Brahma, Vishnu, and Shiva, the Hindu male trinity (Trimurti). Saraswati, Lakshmi, and Parvati, the goddess trinity (Tridevi) and consorts of the male trinity, became jealous. They deputed their husbands to test her virtuousness.

The three gods appeared before Anasuya in the disguise of sanyasis (ascetics) and asked her to give them alms naked. Anasuya was perplexed for a while, but soon regained composure. She uttered a mantra and sprinkled water on the three mendicants, turning them into babies. She then breastfed them with her milk naked, as they wished. As the triad of gods did not return, their wives got worried and rushed to Anasuya. The goddesses begged her forgiveness and requested her to return their husbands. Anasuya accepted their request. The Trimurti then appeared in their true form, before Atri and Anasuya, and blessed them with a son named Dattatreya.

Though Dattatreya is considered a form of all the three deities, he is especially considered an avatar of Vishnu, while his siblings the moon-god Chandra and the sage Durvasa are regarded forms of Brahma and Shiva respectively.

According to another account, Anasuya persuaded a woman named Shilavati to restore the sunrise, after her husband had been cursed to die the following day. When the Trimurti offered her a boon, she requested that they be born as her son, and so Dattatreya was born.

== Worship ==
On Datta Jayanti, people take bath early in the morning in holy rivers or streams, and observe fasting. A puja of Dattatreya is performed with flowers, incense, lamps, and camphor. Devotees meditate on his image and pray to Dattatreya with a vow to follow in his footsteps. They remember Dattatreya's work and read the sacred books Avadhuta Gita and Jivanmukta Gita, which contain the god's discourse. Other sacred texts like the Datta Prabodh (1860) by Kavadi Baba and the Datta Mahatmya by Param Pujya Vasudevananda Saraswati (Tembe Swami Maharaj), both of which are based on Dattatreya's life, as well as the Guru-charita based on the life of Narasimha Saraswati (1378−1458), considered an avatar of Dattatreya, are read by devotees. Bhajans (devotional songs) are also sung on this day.

Datta Jayanti is celebrated with much fanfare in the god's temples. The temples dedicated to Dattatreya are located throughout India, the most important places of his worship are in Karnataka, Maharashtra, Andhra Pradesh and Gujarat like Ganagapur in Karnataka near Gulbarga, Srikshetra Dodderi in Karnataka near Chitradurga, Narasimha Wadi in the Kolhapur district, Pithapuram in Andhra Pradesh near Kakinada, Audumbar in Sangli district, Ruibhar in Osmanabad district and Girnar in Saurashtra.

Some temples like Manik Prabhu Temple, Manik Nagar host an annual 7-day festival in honour of the deity in this period. In this temple, Datta Jayanti is celebrated for 5 days from the occasions of ekadashi to purnima. People from Maharashtra, Karnataka, and Telangana come here to have darshan of the deity. The saint Manik Prabhu, who is also regarded as an incarnation of Dattatreya by the people of Datta Sampradaya, was born on Datta Jayanti.

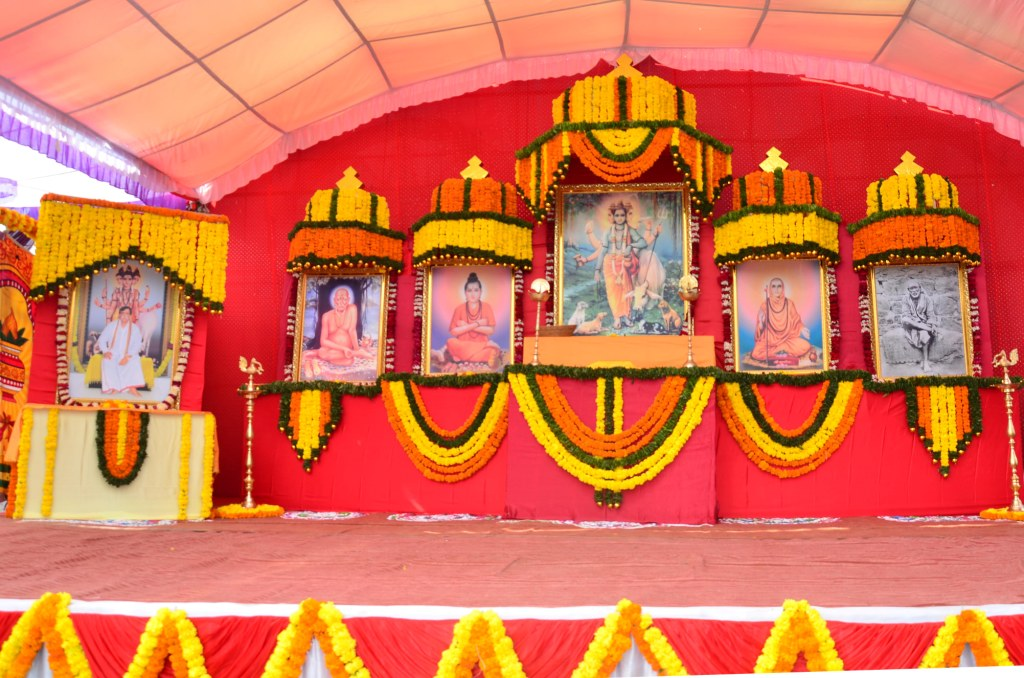
Datta Jayanti Celebrations, Alamner
