= Abaya Hastha Swayambu Sri Lakshmi Narasimha Swamy Temple, Agaram Village, Hosur =

Abaya Hastha Swayambu Sri Lakshmi Narasimha Swamy

- Location in Tamil Nadu

Religion
- Affiliation: Hinduism
- District: Krishnagiri
- Deity: Sri Lakshmi Narasimha Swamy, Goddess Lakshmi
- Festival: Narasimha Jayanthi

Location
- Location: Agaram Agraharam
- State: Tamil Nadu
- Country: India
- Interactive map of Abaya Hastha Swayambu Sri Lakshmi Narasimha Swamy
- Coordinates: 12.60°N 77.94°E

Architecture
- Type: Under Construction
- Completed: 2011

Specifications
- Direction of façade: East
- Temple: one

Abaya Hastha Swayambu Sri Lakshmi Narasimha Swamy Temple is a holy Hindu religious site in the village of Agaram Agraharam in Hosur taluk of Krishnagiri district in the Indian state of Tamil Nadu. It is located 15 km from Hosur on Rayakotta Road and 65 km from Bangalore.

Hosur is a rapidly growing industrial hub as well as a famous pilgrimage centre, and is also known as Dakshina Kashi ("Southern Kashi"), since the town is surrounded by the three hills of Shiva, Vishnu and Brahma, which are not seen anywhere else in India.

== Legend ==
Narasimha slaying Hiranyakasipu

As per Hindu legend, a demon king named Hiranyakasipu was troubling the Devas (celestial deities). He obtained limitless powers from Brahma, that no human could kill him, nor could he be killed in morning, noon or night, nor in air, water or ground. Contrastingly, his son Prahlada was an ardent devotee of Vishnu, whom his father hated. Hiranyakasipu tried to kill Prahalada numerous times, just for him to be saved by the divine grace of Vishnu.

During the last heated argument between the father and the son, Hiranyakasipu asked if Vishnu was present everywhere and went on to break a pillar with his weapon seeking to see Vishnu in it. Vishnu, pleased by the devotion of Prahalada, took the avatar of Narasimha and came out of the opening in the pillar. Narasimha's avatar was a lion-faced human and slayed Hiranyakasipu on an evening time in a doorway, which was neither land nor air. Ages passed by, when the sages were praying Narasimha to seek his blessings. They were guided by the pretext of Vishwamitra gaining the Rajarishi title with his prayers to Narasimha.

== History ==
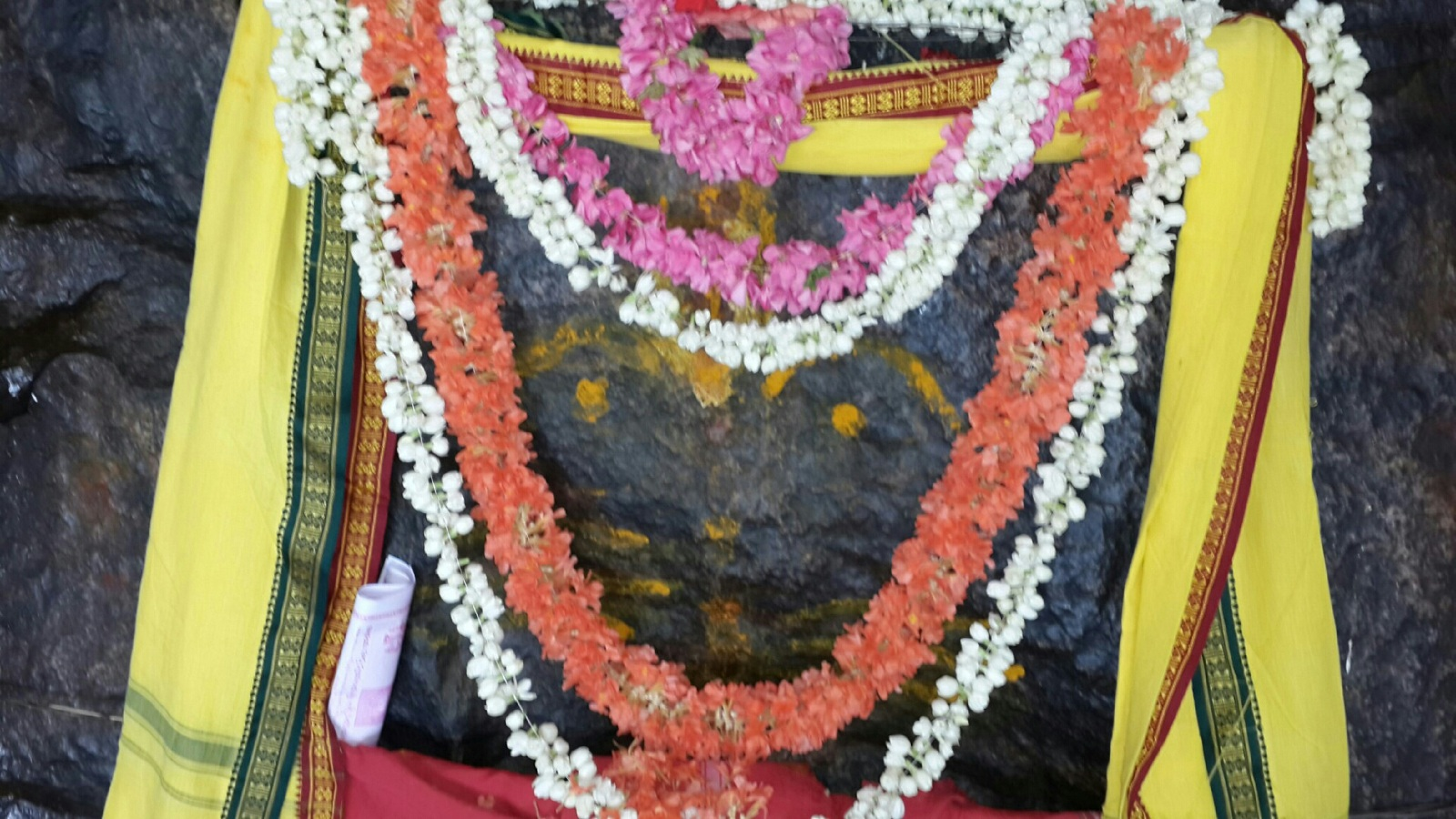
Swayambu of Lakshmi Narasimha Swamy

During 1998, Mr. Rama Krishna, a small shop owner from Bangalore and his friends who were developing a 2.75 acres residential layout near Agaram village, faced obstacles in selling a part of land. During the construction of the compound, a worker experienced feelings believed to be spiritually caused. They approached many astrologers and pandits to determine the cause, and were told that they were answers from Lord Lakshmi Narasimha.

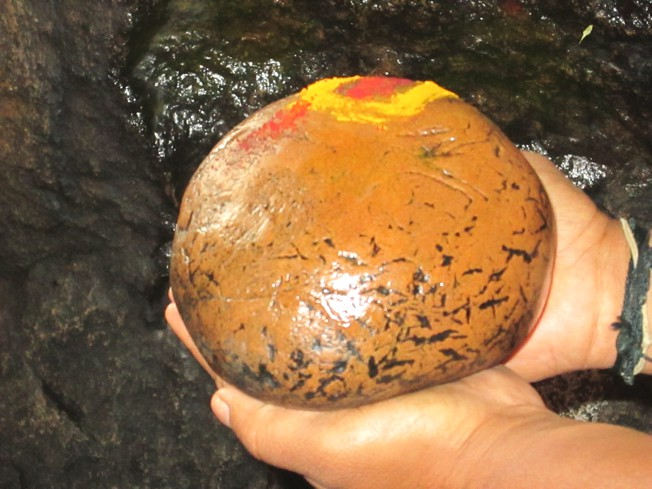
Swayambu of Sri Hanuman

Since Mr. Rama Krishna Guptha was in his business and unaware of Poojas to be performed, he decided to perform Poojas or donate the land to someone who can perform them. While their group of friends were trying to move a heavy spiritual object, the chains and belt fell apart and stood exactly at 90 degree angles facing the center of the property. Again, the pandits told that the event was caused by Lord Narasimha Swamy's presence.

As construction continued, a severe water drought occurred, and no water trucks were able to deliver any supplies. So they decided to put a borewell where it went till 850 feet and no water was found and was a subsequent failure. Then they prayed Lord Narasimha Swamy as per advice of their Guru ji Shri Kodandarama Swamy and decided to build a small water sump on the deva moola of the temple premises, but for surprise they found water gushing at 7 feet level and till today the water has been utilized by the entire villagers as there was no water there.

Swayambu of Sudarshana Chakra

There were many instances of miracles happening including a big serpent guarding the temple premises every day where it will not allow any ladies entering the temple during their mensuration periods . Also, 32 elephants came to the temple and destroyed an illegal compound of the neighbor who produced disturbances to the temple trustees where you can see the compound wall now is also a miracle as they have never seen elephants in that area.

Currently a portion of the land where swamy is situated has been donated to Ahobila Mutt and still it is under the control of the mutt where they decided to build the temple shortly .

== Important events ==
His Highness 46th Jeeyar Sri Satakopa Sri Ranganatha Yateendra Mahadesikanu of Ahobila Mutt

During 2013, his highness, 46th Jeeyar Sri Satakopa Sri Ranganatha Yateendra Mahadesikan of Ahobila Mutt visited Hosur Town. During that time his highness was looking for a piece of land in Hosur for temple construction. Mr. Rama Moorthy and his wife took his blessings and thought of donating the piece of land to Ahobila Mutt where they can see the Nitya Poojas and Yagnas for generations in the future. As per their request, his highness visited the temple.

There was a rock which was supporting Swayambu Narasimha Swamy on the back side and is rare to find elsewhere, which was confirmed by his highness. He also wrote about this Hindu temple miracles as which was published in 2013 at Lakshmi Priya monthly magazine belonging to Ahobila Temple which was widely circulated all over the world. They donated a piece of land to Ahobila Mutt where swamy is situated and the Ahobila Mutt decided to build the temple in that place.

== Festival and religious practices ==
The major festival of the temple is the fifteen-day Panguni Uthiram festival celebrated during the Tamil month of Panguni (March – April) when the image of presiding deities are taken around the streets of the temple in a temple chariot. Other festivals of the temple include Chittirai Tamil New year, Vaigasi Visagam, Telugu New Year, Avani Pavitrotsavam, Narasimhar Jayanthi, Vaikunta Ekadasi and Thai Pongal during various months of the year.
