= Hallikheda =

Hallikhed B Hallikhed (B)
- town
- Nickname: Hallikheda(B)
- Location in Karnataka, India Hallikhed B (India)
- Coordinates: 17.85°N 77.27°E
- Country: India
- State: Karnataka
- District: Bidar
- Talukas: Humnabad

Government
  - Type: Town Municipal Council
  - Body: Hallikhed Town Municipal Council

Area
  - Total: 23.6 km^{2} (9.1 sq mi)

Population (2020)
  - Total: 24,196
  - Density: 854/km^{2} (2,210/sq mi)
- Demonym: Hallikhedkar

Languages
  - Official: Kannada
- Time zone: UTC+5:30 (IST)
- Postal code: 585414
- Vehicle registration: KA38
- Nearest city: Bidar and Humnabad

Hallikhed (B) is a town in the northern part of Karnataka, India. It is located in the Humnabad taluk of Bidar district in Karnataka, 33 km from Bidar and 20 km from Humnabad, near highway, NH-50.

== Demographics ==
As of 2001 India census, Hallikhed(B) had a population of 17,162, with 8,963 males and 8,199 females.

== See also ==
- Bidar
- Districts of Karnataka
