= Humnabad railway station =

Railway station in Karnataka, India

Humnabad Homnabad

General information
- Location: Railway Station Rd, Humnabad, Bidar district, Karnataka. India
- Coordinates: 17°46′17″N 77°08′14″E
- Elevation: 633 m (2,077 ft)
- System: Indian Railways station
- Line: Bidar–Gulbarga
- Platforms: 2
- Tracks: 5 ft 6 in (1,676 mm) broad gauge

Construction
- Structure type: Standard (on-ground station)
- Parking: Available

Other information
- Status: Functioning
- Station code: HMBD
- Zone(s): South Central Railway,
- Division(s): Secunderabad
Location
- Location within India Location within Karnataka

Humnabad railway station, (station code: HMBD) is an Indian Railways Train station located in Humnabad, Bidar in the Indian state of Karnataka and serves Humnabad area. It is located on the Bidar-Kalaburagi line of Secunderabad railway division in South Central Railway zone.

== History ==
Bidar–Gulbarga Railway Line foundation stone for the project was laid in 1996, construction began in 2000 .The work completed in two phases. Phase one push-pull train service between Bidar and Humnabad started in 2013.The second phase between Humnabad and Gulbarga delayed due to land acquisition in Gulbarga, as farmers went to court seeking higher compensation, and on 29 October 2017 the full line flagged off between Bidar and Gulbarga (Kalaburagi).

== Structure and expansion ==
Humnabad railway station has two platforms, each running to 400 meter in length, computerized reservation counter, waiting room, tea stall, parking, foot overbridge, and toilet facilities. Humnabad has connectivity with Kalaburagi and Bidar.

Preceding station	Indian Railways	Following station
Nandagaon Halli Halt (NGNH) towards ?	South Central Railway zone Bidar–Gulbarga	Kattalli (KTAI) towards ?
