= Shri Manik Prabhu Devasthanam =

Manik Prabhu temple
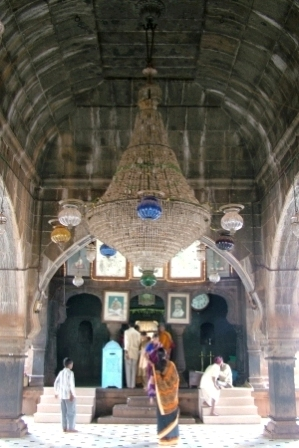
- Manik Prabhu temple, Maniknagar

- Location within Karnataka Location within India

Religion
- Affiliation: Hinduism
- District: Bidar district
- Deity: Manik Prabhu
- Festivals: Datta Jayanti, Manik Pournima Parva, Guru Aaradhana Mahotsava, Devi Pancharatra Mahotsava, Shravan Maas Mahotsava, Vedant Saptah Mahotsava
- Governing body: Shri Manik Prabhu Samsthan

Location
- Location: Manik Nagar Village, Humnabad
- State: Karnataka
- Country: India
- Interactive map of Manik Prabhu temple
- Coordinates: 17.7818°N 77.1130°E

Architecture
- Elevation: 607 m (1,991 ft)

Website
- manikprabhu.org

Sri Manik Prabhu Devasthanam is a Hindu temple located in the Manik Nagar near, Humnabad in the state of Karnataka, India

== History ==
Manik Prabhu selected Manik Nagar as the significant and ideal place to lay the foundation of spiritual centre. Manik Nagar is located on high slope grounds. Manik Prabhu temple lies on the outskirts of Humnabad, a kilometer away from this taluka. The temple is located on the confluence of two rivulets Viraja and Guru Ganga.

People believe that Manik Prabhu, the renowned saint, was the fourth incarnation of Lord Dattatreya. There was political and religious chaos between two communities, Hindu and Muslim, and these were riotous times. Manik Prabhu had an envisioned that these two streams (communities) would come together and lead peaceful lives. Due to this prognostic vision, today both Hindus and Muslims visit Manik Nagar every year to pay homage to the Great Founder of Universal Truth, the Sakalmata. The Muslim community considers Shri Prabhu to be an Avatar of Mehaboob Subhani, a Muslim Saint.

Originally, a small hut was constructed to establish the Gadi, or the Spiritual Seat, which later was to be associated with the living spirit of Shri Manik Prabhu Maharaj. Sitting on the Gadi, he would give Darshan to audience and his Darshan would give peace and contentment to all who visited Maniknagar.

In the Durbar, people gathered, who would bask in the aura and the benevolent grace of Shri Prabhu. The entire atmosphere would be surcharged with spiritual splendour. Shri Prabhu would cast his compassionate glance on all, making everybody participate in the bliss, which he was experiencing.

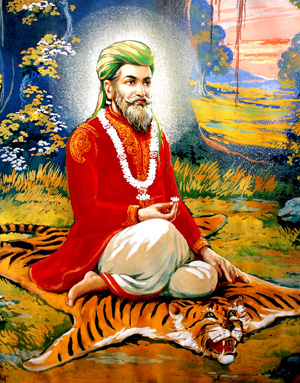
Maharaj Manik Prabhu ji

== Mahasamadhi ==
Prabhu realised that the time had come to shed his mortal body and be one with eternity. As Shri Prabhu was reluctant to disclose the time of his own departure to all, he took only three or four persons into confidence, those who understood the significance of his Avatar (incarnation). The news was kept in utmost confidence and all the required work was carried on with a smile on the face but with remorse in the heart. He advised them,

You think that once I take Samadhi everything will end and I will no more be available to you. What you will miss is the sight of my Gross body, but my Self, the spirit within, will ever remain with you to guide you without your realizing that fact. There will not be any breach in your spiritual path. Remember that decay and destruction of the gross body is certain. When every breath has already been numbered and assigned what is the purpose of grieving? It is good that my work here is now coming to an end. You will all be able to carry the mission further by the Energy, which I will be leaving behind. What’s the use of remaining alive in this worthless body when the work is complete?

On the tenth day of Margashirsha, Shri Prabhu decided to summon the Durbar, so that people could have his final Darshan. All arrangements were made for Shri Prabhu to sit in as comfortable a position as was possible.

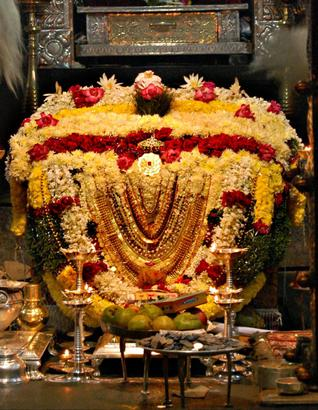
Maha-Samadhi of Shri Prabhu inside the temple

The next day was Ekadashi, the eleventh day of the month. For Hindus it is one of the most auspicious days. This 29th day of the month of November 1865 was the day on which Srhi Prabhu had decided to take samadhi and merge his Self with the Supreme Self. Before samadhi he called two sons of His brother Narisimha and blessed them and thus the line of succession to the Gadi (spiritual seat) was laid down for all to know. He made the elder one Manohar the successor to Gadi by transferring his Eternal Energy to him. Thus the Guru-Parampara of Shri Manik Prabhu Sampradya was established for all time to come.
