= Merajuddin Patel =

Indian politician

Minister of Animal Husbandry, Government of Karnataka
- In office 2004–2006
- Constituency: Humnabad

Minister of Wakf, Government of Karnataka
- In office 2004–2006
- Constituency: Humnabad

Minister of Municipal Affairs, Government of Karnataka
- In office 1996–1997
- Preceded by: Himself
- Constituency: Humnabad

Minister of Municipal Affairs, Government of Karnataka
- In office 1994–1996
- Succeeded by: Himself
- Constituency: Humnabad

Member of the Karnataka Legislative Assembly
- In office 13 May 2004 – 7 October 2008
- Preceded by: Rajashekhar Basavaraj Patil
- Succeeded by: Rajashekhar Basavaraj Patil
- Constituency: Humnabad
- In office 1994–1999
- Preceded by: Rajashekhar Basavaraj Patil
- Succeeded by: Rajashekhar Basavaraj Patil
- Constituency: Humnabad

Personal details
- Born: 1955 Humnabad
- Died: 7 October 2008 (aged 52–53) Gulbarga
- Party: Janata Dal (Secular)
- Other political affiliations: Janata Dal

Merajuddin Patel was a politician from the Indian state of Karnataka. He was a two term member M.L.A from Humnabad assembly constituency (1994 and 2004). He served as Minister for Municipal Administration in the J. H. Patel cabinet and as Minister for Animal Husbandry and Wakf in the Dharam Singh cabinet. He was the Janata Dal (Secular) state president at the time of his death and leaves behind a wife and seven daughters.
