= Manik Nagar =

Manik Nagar Maniknagar
- village
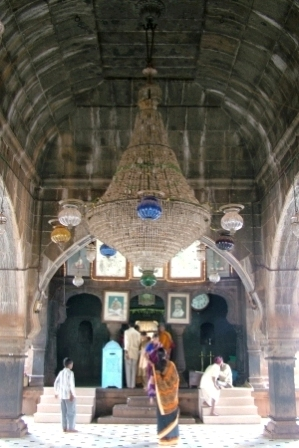
- Manik Prabhu temple, Manik Nagar
- Country: India
- State: Karnataka
- District: Bidar
- Established: 1845 (181 years ago)
- Founder: Manik Prabhu
- Named for: Manik Prabhu

Population (2020)
  - Total: 2,834

Languages
  - Official: Kannada
- Time zone: UTC+5:30 (IST)
- PIN: 585353
- Nearest city: Bidar

Maniknagar is a village located 3.5 kilometres (2.2 miles) away from Humnabad city in Bidar district in the Indian state of Karnataka. Maniknagar is a little village comprising a hamlet and a temple complex, the nucleus of which is the main temple of Manik Prabhu's Samadhi. Maniknagar is situated on the slopes of high ground near the holy confluence of two little rivulets Guru-Ganga and Viraja. The climate is by and large temperate.

== See also ==
- Shri Manik Prabhu Devasthanam
