= Rajashekar Patil =

Indian politician

Rajashekar Basavaraj Patil

Minister of Mines and Geology of Karnataka
- In office 23 May 2018 – 23 July 2019
- Preceded by: Vinay Kulkarni
- Succeeded by: C. C. Patil

Member of Karnataka Legislative Assembly
- In office 2003–2004
- Preceded by: Subhash Kallur BJP
- Succeeded by: Merajuddin Patel, JDS

Member of the Karnataka Legislative Assembly
- In office 25 May 2008 – 13 May 2023
- Preceded by: Merajuddin Patel, JDS
- Succeeded by: Dr. Siddu Patil
- Constituency: Humnabad (Vidhana Sabha constituency)

Personal details
- Born: Rajashekhar Basavaraj Patil; 1 April 1965 (age 61) Humnabad
- Party: Indian National Congress
- Parents: Basavaraj Havgiappa Patil (father); Umadevi Patil (mother)

Rajashekhar Basavaraj Patil is an Indian politician served as the Member of the Karnataka Legislative Assembly for Humnabad Assembly constituency from 2008 to 13 May 2023.

Rajashekar Patil has been appointed as Karnataka Rural Infrastructure Development Ltd Chairman in 2016.

== Positions held ==
- 2008 - MLA Humnabad Vidhana Sabha constituency as INC candidate.
- 2013 - MLA Humnabad Vidhana Sabha constituency as INC candidate.
- 2018 - MLA Humanabad Vidhana Sabha constituency as INC candidate.
- 2018- Minister Mines and Zoology from Commerce and Industries Department in INC-JDS coalition government.
