= Vaikuntha Ekadashi =

Hindu occasion

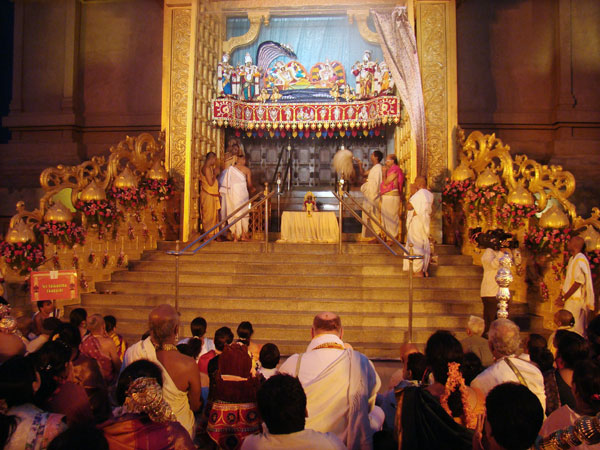
- Vaikuntha Ekadashi observed at ISKCON, Bangalore
- Observed by: Vaishnavas
- Type: Hindu
- Significance: Vishnu's victory over Murāsura; Opening of the gates of Vaikuntha
- Celebrations: Temple celebration, rituals
- Observances: Fasting
- Date: dhanu māsa, śukla pakṣa, ekādaśī tithi
- Frequency: Annual

Vaikuntha Ekadashi (Sanskrit: वैकुण्ठ एकादशी, lit. 'Eleventh day of Vaikuntha') is a Hindu occasion and festival. It is primarily observed by Vaishnavas, who regard it to be a special ekadashi. It coincides with Mokshada Ekadashi or Putrada Ekadashi. It is observed on the 11th lunar day of the waxing lunar fortnight of the solar month of Dhanu. (Note: Most Hindu festivals are fixed using the lunar portion of the Hindu lunisolar calendar. This festival is an exception. It is fixed using a combination of the solar (month) and lunar (fortnight and day) portions of the Hindu calendar.) This falls between 16 December and 13 January in the Gregorian calendar.

== Legend ==
The origin of Vaikuntha Ekadashi is mentioned in a legend of the Padma Purana. There was once an asura named Murāsura, who was a nightmare to the devas, owing to a boon he had received from Brahma. They sought the assistance of Vishnu, who fought against the asura in a battle, but was unable to defeat him. He travelled to a cave called Simhavati in the vicinity of Badarikashrama, where he was pursued by Murāsura. There, Vishnu summoned Yogamaya, a goddess created from his divine energy, who slew the asura. Vishnu, who was pleased, offered the goddess the epithet 'Ekadashi', and declared that she would be capable of vanquishing the sins of all the people of Earth. In Vaishnava tradition, it is held all those who observe a fast on the occasion and worship Ekadashi would attain Vaikuntha. Thus came into being the first Ekadashi, which was a Dhanurmasa Shukla Paksha Ekadashi.

According to a later story, there was once a Vaishnava king of Ayodhya called Ambarisha, who always maintained his vow of fasting for the occasion. Once, after three days of fasting for the occasion, he was about to break his fast, when the sage Durvasa appeared at his city's gates. The king received the sage with honour, and offered him a meal, which the latter accepted, but went first to perform his ritual ablutions. Even as Ambarisha waited for a long while, the sage did not return, and the auspicious moment of breaking his fast approached. He faced a dilemma: If he did not break his fast before the day was over, the act of his fasting would not bear fruit; However, if he ate a single morsel of food before Durvasa returned, that was regarded as disrespectful. He decided to simply sip some water, which broke his fast, but was hoped to not prove to seem insulting to the sage. Durvasa was infuriated when he returned, and tore a clump of hair from his head, which was sent charging to attack the king. The Sudarshana Chakra of Vishnu intervened to destroy the clump, which then proceeded to chase the sage. Durvasa fled, attempting to seek the protection of Brahma and Shiva, but the two deities denied him refuge. Finally, Durvasa begged for his life from Vishnu himself, who informed him that his salvation lay at the hands of his devotees. Accordingly, Durvasa sought forgiveness from Ambarisha, and was saved.

According to another legend, Vishnu opened the gate of Vaikuntha (his abode) for two asuras (demons) in spite of their being against him. They also asked for this boon: Whoever listens to their story, and sees the image of Vishnu coming out of the door called Vaikuntha Dvaram, would reach Vaikuntha as well. Temples all over India make a door kind of structure on this day for devotees to walk through.

== Significance ==
=== Vaishnavism ===
Vaishnavas (Devotees of Vishnu) believe that ‘Vaikuntha Dvaram’ (the gate to Vaikuntha) is opened on this day. The Margashirsha Shukla Paksha Ekadashi in the Lunar calendar is known as a 'Mokshada Ekadashi.' Special prayers from the Vedas, Naalayira Divya Prabandham, Vaikuntha Gadyam as well as the Vaikuntha Dvara Puja, Prakarothsvam (Sri Veli), Oonjal Seva (swing pooja), Oonjal Prabhandham, yagnas, discourses, and speeches are arranged at several Vishnu temples around the world on this auspicious day.

Vaikuntha refers to the abode of the Hindu preserver deity, Vishnu. Vaishnavas consider the feet of Vishnu to be Vishnupada, or Parama Padam (Ultimate feet), as it is regarded to be the realm for Vishnu and his devotees to reside in the suddha-sattva, or the supreme state of purity and goodness.

In Vishnu temples, Vaikuntha Ekadashi is part of Dhanurmasam (Margazhi) vratam and its puja. Fasting for the entire month of Dhanurmasam is practised by several Vaishnavas, including temperance and food restrictions for Sri Vaishnavas.

According to the Vishnu Purana, fasting on Vaikuntha Ekadashi is equivalent to fasting on the remaining 23 ekadashis of the (Hindu) year. However, according to Vaishnava tradition, fasting is mandatory on all ekadashis of both Shukla paksha and Krishna paksha. Fasting on Ekadashi is considered holier than any other religious observation. Complete fasting has to be observed on Ekadashi, the 11th day of the paksha. That is why the meal on the Dvadashi (the 12th day) is designed to be wholesome, nutritious, and filling.

=== Fasting ===
Vaikuntha Ekadashi fasting is an important aspect of those associated with it. People fast the whole day and keep vigil. Special prayers are offered to Vishnu and devotees engage in Japa (chanting of Vishnu's name) and Dhyana (Meditation). On 'Dashami', the previous day of the observance, devotees who take up Vaikuntha Ekadashi fasting are to take only lunch. On Ekadashi, the next day, they have to maintain a complete fast and engage in prayers and meditation of Vishnu. They are strictly prohibited from taking rice. That night, people keep vigil the whole night and visit the temple of Vishnu, mostly in the wee hours of the morning.

The Shaiva sect observes the day as Trikoti Ekadashi, a religious observance where adherents regard it to be the date when all the deities in the Hindu pantheon pay obeisance to Shiva.

== Celebrations ==
The celebrations of the occasion span across all Venkateswara temples. The most important for this particular festival is considered to be in Srirangam which is specifically known for the Svarga Vasal opening. The next most important is considered to be in Tirupati in the Tirumala hills, which houses the highly venerated abode of Venkateswara.

=== Srirangam ===
At the Sri Ranganathaswamy Temple, Srirangam Vaikuntha Ekadashi celebrations last for 20 days, divided into two parts: pagal pathu (morning part 10 days) and Ira pathu (night part 10 days). Vishnu, as the mulavar (central temple idol) of Ranganatha, is regarded to bless devotees in his Muthangi, an armour of pearls, on all 20 days. On the 10th day of Pagal Pathu (previous day of Vaikuntha Ekadashi), the utsavar (processional idol), named Namperumal, is believed to bless devotees, in his form as Mohini.

On Vaikuntha Ekadashi, during daybreak, Namperumal is regarded to bless devotees, clad in an armour of diamonds and gems, and brought to the thousand-pillared hall from the sanctum sanctorum, through the northern gate known as Paramapada Vasal, the gate to Vaikuntha. This gate is opened once in a year, only on the occasion of Vaikuntha Ekadashi. It is said that anyone who goes through the Paramapada Vasal will attain Vaikuntha. For this reason, it is also known as the Svarga Vasal.

=== Tirupati ===
The Tirumala Venkateswara Temple also has a similar concept to celebrate Mukkoti Ekadasi, as it is known in the Telugu-speaking regions. Tirumala has a special entrance called Vaikunta Dvaram that encircles the sanctum sanctorum. The dvaram (gateway) is opened only on Vaikunta Ekadasi, and it is believed that any person who passes through this 'Vaikunta Dvaram' on this particular day attains Vaikunta. The temple witnesses heavy inflow of pilgrims and dignitaries for Vaikunta Ekadashi.

== See also ==
- Divya Desams
- Ekadashi
- Vaikuntha
