= Kamada Ekadashi =

Hindu observance

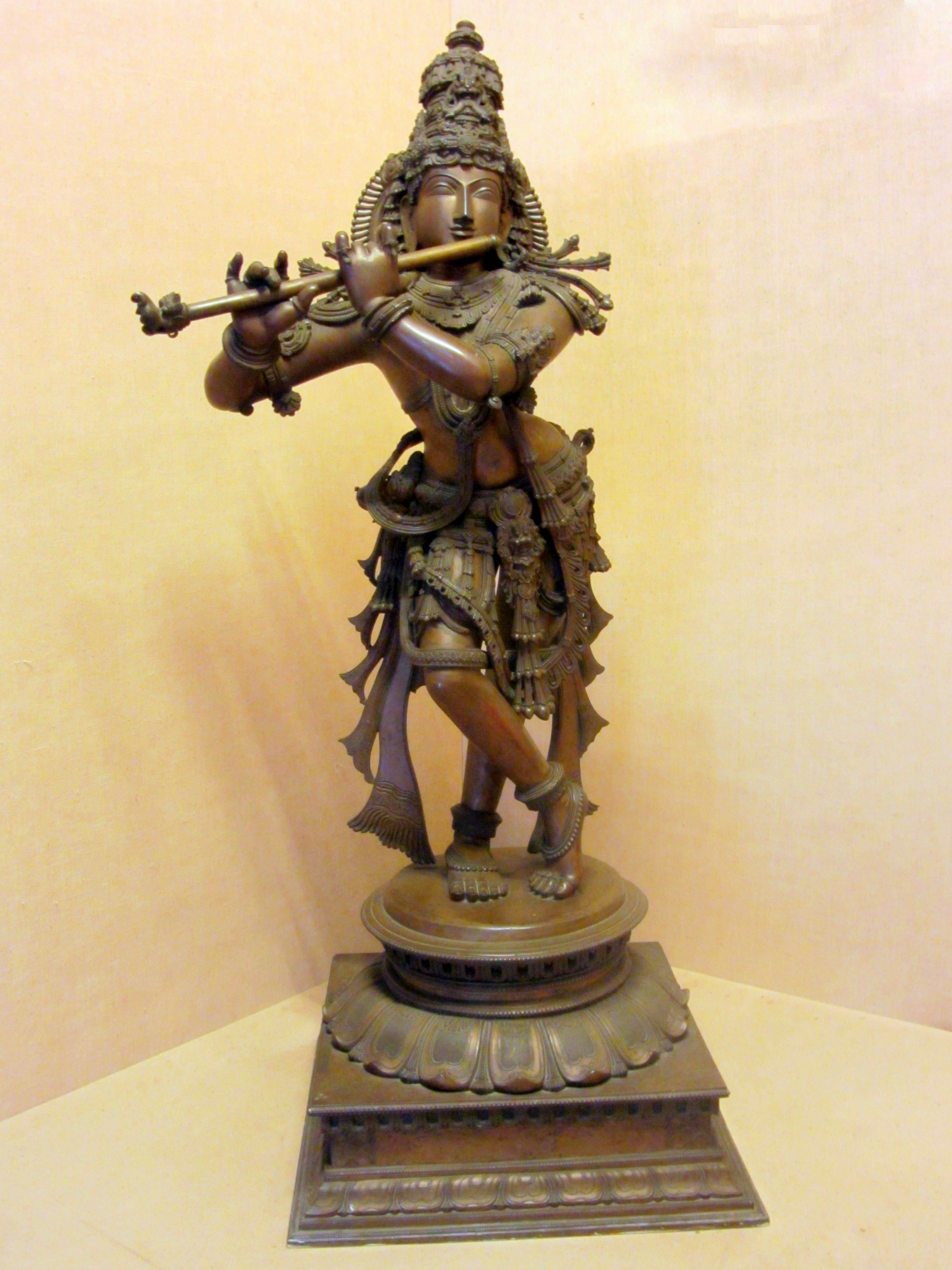
- Krishna (pictured) is worshipped on Kamada Ekadashi
- Observed by: Hindus
- Type: Hindu
- Significance: Fasting day
- Observances: Prayers and religious rituals, including puja to the god Vishnu in the form of his avatar Krishna

Kamada Ekadasi (Sanskrit: कामदा एकादशी, romanized: Kāmadā Ekādaśī, lit. 'the eleventh day of desires') is a Hindu occasion, which falls on the 11th lunar day (ekadashi) of the fortnight of the waxing moon in the Hindu month of Chaitra (March–April). It is the first ekadashi after the Chaitra Navaratri, the Hindu lunar new year. As its name Kamada suggests, it is believed to be the occasion when all the desires of a devotee are granted.

== Legend ==
The legend about the Kamada Ekadashi is narrated by the deity Krishna to the Pandava King Yudhishthira in the Varaha Purana, as it was told by the sage Vasishtha to King Dilipa. Once, a young gandharva couple, Lalit, and his wife Lalita, lived in the city of Ratnapura, a highly prosperous city decorated with gold and silver, which was ruled by the King Pundarika. Lalit was a famed singer, while Lalita was a renowned dancer at the royal court. One day, when Lalit was singing in the royal court, his attention diverted from the song to his wife, who was absent from the court. As a result, he missed some beats and incorrectly ended his performance. A nāga from the Patala region, Karkotaka, knew well the mystery of this situation complained to the king of the folly, and said that Lalit considered his wife more important than his master, the king. Infuriated, the King Pundarika cursed Lalit to become a monstrous cannibal, who was sixty-four miles in height. His neck was like a mountain, arms eight miles long and mouth the size of huge cave. This greatly distressed Lalita, who wandered around the forests with her monstrous husband who dealt in sinful activities.

While wandering around the Vindhyachal Hills, Lalita came across the sage Shringi. Paying her respects to the sage, she appealed to him to provide a solution to her problem. Sage Shringi told her to observe the vrata (vow) of Kamada Ekadasi, to atone for the sins of her husband. Lalita observed the ekadashi fast with great devotion and the next day again visited the sage and bowed to the deity Krishna. She requested Krishna to free her husband from the king's curse as a reward of the religious merit gained by the fast. With the blessings of Krishna, Lalit was restored to his original gandharva form. Thereafter, they were taken to Svarga on a celestial flying chariot.

== Practices ==
After taking bath in the morning of Kamada Ekadashi, the devotee observes a fast. Worship is also offered to Vishnu in the form of Krishna, often in a nearby temple.

The religious merit gained from this vrata is believed to grant all desires, to cleanse even the most heinous sin one committed and to free the devotee or his family members from curses.

== Bibliography ==
- Lochtefeld, James G. (2002). The Illustrated Encyclopedia of Hinduism: A-M. ABC-CLIO. ISBN 9781598842050.
- Melton, J. Gordon (2011), Religious Celebrations: An Encyclopedia of Holidays, Festivals, Solemn Observances, and Spiritual Commemorations, ABC-CLIO, ISBN 9781598842050
- Dwivedi, Dr. Bhojraj Dwivedi (2006), Religious Basis Of Hindu Beliefs, Diamond Pocket Books (P) Ltd, ISBN 9788128812392
