= Varuthini Ekadashi =

Hindu holy day

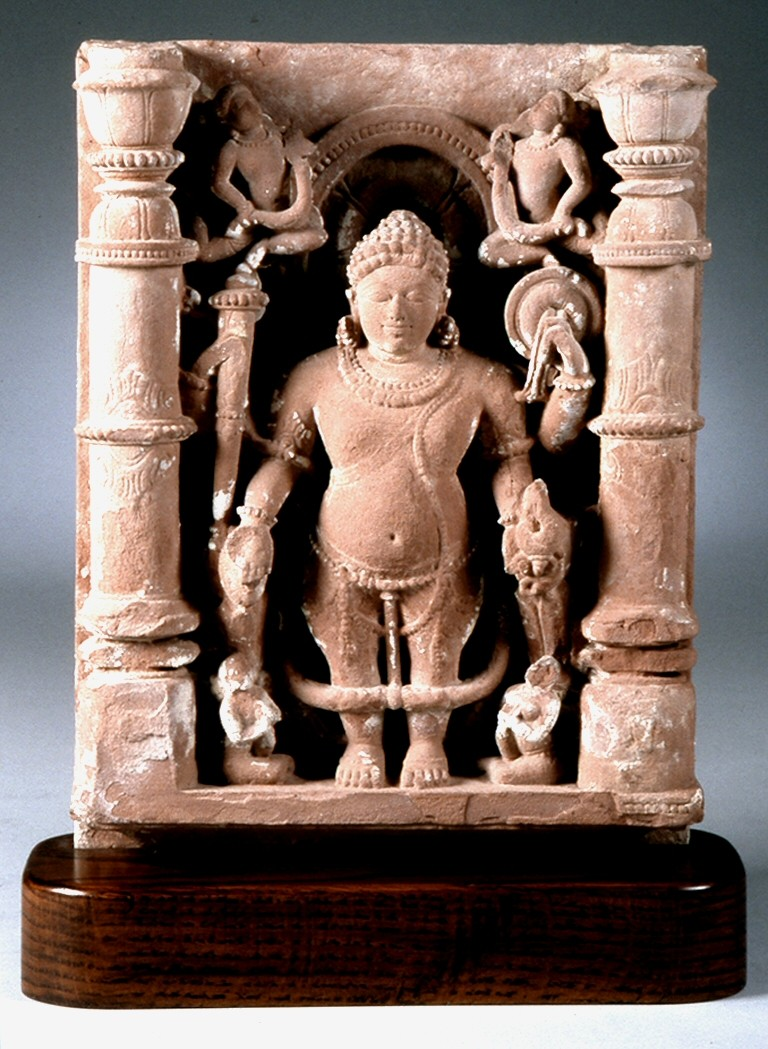
- Vamana is worshipped on Varuthini Ekadashi
- Also called: Baruthani Ekadashi
- Observed by: Hindus
- Type: Hindu
- Significance: Fasting day
- Observances: Prayers and religious rituals, including puja to the god Vishnu
- Date: Dark Half of the lunar calendar month of Chaitra or Vaisakhi
- Frequency: annual

Varuthini Ekadashi, also known Baruthani Ekadashi, is a Hindu holy day, which falls on the 11th lunar day (ekadashi) of the fortnight of the waning moon in the Hindu month of Chaitra (per the South Indian Amavasyant calendar, every month ends with a new moon) or Vaishakha (per the North Indian Purnimant calendar, every month ends with a full moon). By both schemes, Varuthini Ekadashi falls on the same day in April or May. Vamana, the fifth avatar of Vishnu, is revered.

== Significance ==
The greatness about Varuthini Ekadashi is narrated by the Hindu deity, Krishna, to King Yudhishthira in the Bhavishya Purana. "Baruthini", means "armored" or "protected." Thus, those who observe this ekadashi are protected from evil and given good fortune. King Mandata was enlightened. The Ikshvaku king Dhundhumara was freed was from a curse by the god Shiva. All human beings are assured of prosperity in this life and the next. In the order of donations made on this day, the order of superior benefits are derived in the ascending order of benefits given namely, a horse, an elephant, land, sesame seeds, food grains, gold and cows and finally the highest benefit would be achieved by sharing one's knowledge with others. All such charitable actions would please one's ancestors, the gods and all living entities.

== Practices ==
On Varuthini Ekadashi, certain rules are prescribed to be followed strictly. One should keep an all-night vigil, praying to God, singing devotional songs and hymns in the company of family members. One should not indulge in gambling, sports, sleep, anger, robbery, lying, being narrow minded, brushing one's teeth, exercise, shaving one's head, face or body, smearing oil on one's body and saying something bad about others. One should abstain from violence and any sexual activity.

One should observe a fast (upavasa) and have only one meal. One should not eat meat, black gram, red lentil, chickpea, honey, betel nut, paan (betel nut leaves) and spinach. Eating in bell metal utensils and eating in someone else's house is prohibited. The Havishyanna food (boiled food without spices, salt and oil) offered to the yajna (fire sacrifice) on the previous day (10th lunar day - Dashami) should be consumed by the people observing this fast.

Following all these rules on Varuthini Ekadashi is believed to usher prosperity, name and fame to the individual in the society.

== Bibliography ==
- Lochtefeld, James G. (2002). The Illustrated Encyclopedia of Hinduism: A-M. ABC-CLIO. ISBN 9781598842050.
- Dwivedi, Dr. Bhojraj (2006). Religious Basis Of Hindu Beliefs. Diamond Pocket Books (P) Ltd. pp. 148–149. ISBN 9788128812392.
