= Siddu Patil =

Indian politician (born 1978)

Member of the Karnataka Legislative Assembly
- Incumbent
- Assumed office 13 May 2023
- Preceded by: Rajashekar Patil
- Constituency: Humnabad Assembly constituency

Personal details
- Born: 1 January 1978 (age 48) Humnabad, Karnataka, India
- Party: Bharatiya Janata Party (2023–present)
- Education: Bachelor of Dental Surgery (2004)
- Alma mater: HKDETs Dental College & Hospital, Humnabad

Siddu Nagbhushan Patil (born 1978) is an Indian politician from Karnataka. He is an MLA from Humnabad Assembly constituency in Bidar district. He won the 2023 Karnataka Legislative Assembly election representing the Bharatiya Janata Party.

== Early life and education ==
Patil is from Humnabad, Bidar district. His father Nagbhushan is a farmer. He completed his Bachelor of Dental Surgery in 2004 at HKDETs Dental College & Hospital, Humnabad which is affiliated with Rajiv Gandhi University of Health Sciences, Karnataka.

== Career ==
Patil won the Humnabad Assembly constituency representing the Bharatiya Janata Party in the 2023 Karnataka Legislative Assembly election. He polled 75,515 votes and defeated his nearest rival,a four time MLA, Rajashekar Patil of the Indian National Congress, by a narrow margin of 1,594 votes. Rajashekar Patil is his cousin and a former minister in the Congress ministry. In August 2024, he visited the government girls and boys high school in Humnabad and checked the requirements of the school.
