= Amalaka Ekadashi =

Hindu holy day

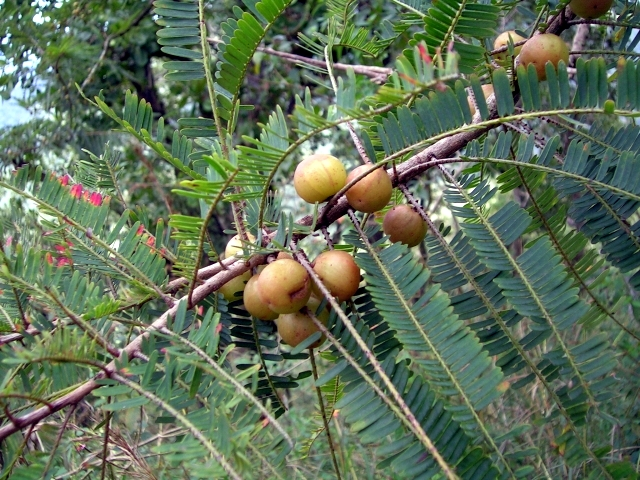
- The amla tree
- Also called: Amalaki Ekadashi
- Observed by: Hindus
- Type: Hindu
- Significance: Vishnu, Lakshmi, Damodara (Krishna) and Radha said to reside near the tree
- Observances: Prayers and religious rituals, including puja to the amla tree
- Date: Decided by the lunar calendar
- Frequency: annual

Amalaka Ekadashi or Amalaki Ekadashi (Sanskrit: आमलकी एकादशी, romanized: Āmalakī Ekādaśī) is a Hindu holy day, celebrated on the 11th day (ekadashi) of the waxing moon, in the lunar month of Phalguna (February–March). It is a celebration of the amalaka or amla tree (Phyllanthus emblica), known as the Indian gooseberry.

The deity Vishnu, for whom ekadashis are sacred, is believed to reside in the tree. The amla tree is ritually worshiped on this day to get the grace of the deity. The day marks the beginning of the main celebrations of the festival of Holi, the Hindu festival of colours.

== Significance ==
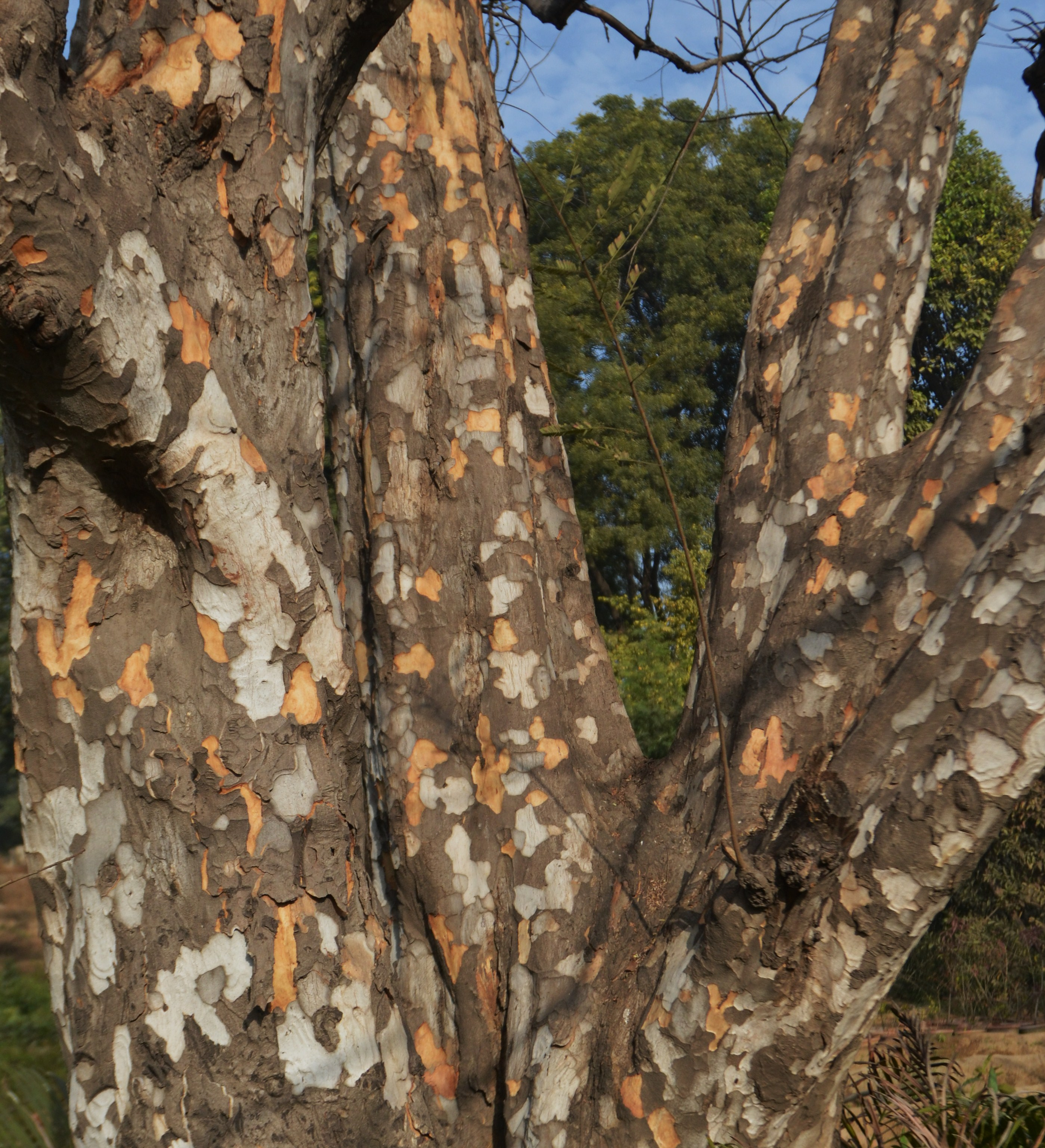
Indian gooseberry, or aamla (Phyllanthus emblica)

Tree veneration is an integral part of Hinduism, which believes that Brahman, the Ultimate Reality, resides in everything.

The veneration of the amla tree in particular is due to the belief that the deity Vishnu lives in and near the tree, particularly on Amalaka Ekadashi. In some traditions, his wife Lakshmi, the deity of wealth, is said to dwell in the tree. It is believed that Vishnu's avatar Krishna and his consort Radha reside near the tree.

Another reason for the worship are its supposed medicinal qualities used in Ayurvedic medicinal preparations, primarily due to its rich content of vitamin C in fresh fruit.

== Legend ==
The legend of a ritual fast is also called a Vrata katha (tale of the vrata, a religious vow).

According to the legend narrated for the occasion, King Chitrasena and his subjects observed the vrata of Amalaka Ekadashi. During one of his hunting trips, Chitrasena lost his way in the forest and was captured by the rakshasas (demons) who attacked him with weapons. Though he remained physically unharmed, the king fell unconscious as more rakshasas surrounded him. A divine power in the form of a light emerged from his body and destroyed his attackers and then vanished. On regaining consciousness, Chitrasena was stunned to see all the attackers killed. A divine voice (Akasavani) announced that this was due to the observance of the Ekadashi vrata. Following this incident, the vrata became popular in the kingdom, which led to peace and harmony.

A variant of this tale is found in the Brahmanda Purana as narrated by the sage Vasishtha. King Chaitraratha of Vaidisa and his subjects were blessed with riches due to the worship of Vishnu. Once, on Amalaki Ekadashi, Chaitraratha and his subjects worshiped Vishnu and the amla tree near the Vishnu temple, on a riverbank. He also worshipped Parashurama, the sage-avatar of Vishnu. The devotees fasted and remained awake the whole night, singing bhajans (devotional songs) in praise of Vishnu. A hungry hunter joined the group and followed the Amalaka Ekadashi vrata. As a result, after his death he was reborn as King Vasuratha. Vasuratha is described as undergoing a similar experience to King Chitrasena from the earlier tale. The main difference is that Vasuratha does not perform the vrata in this life but in his previous life. The moral of the tale is told to be that the performance of Amalaka Ekadashi vrata, without any desire and just pure devotion, results in the grace of Vishnu, in this and next lives.

== Practices ==
The observer of the vrata should have a ritual bath in the morning. The devotee or priests ceremonially bathe and water the tree and then worship it with a puja ritual. Devotees fast on this day and gifts are offered to Brahmin priests praying for prosperity, wealth and health. Devotees also listen to the vrata katha of Amalaka Ekadashi. Offering of food and charity is prescribed on this day; the virtue is equated to the performance of a vajapeya, a somayajna sacrifice.

Though the festival of Holi begins on Vasant Panchami, it is on Amalaka Ekadashi that the main festivities begin. The day marks the beginning of the climax of Holi, culminating on four lunar days later on the full moon. From this day, people start playing with colours.
