= Humnabad Assembly constituency =

Constituency of Karnataka Legislative Assembly

Coordinates: 17.77°N 77.13°E

Humnabad
- Constituency No. 48 for the Karnataka Legislative Assembly

Constituency details
- Country: India
- Region: South India
- State: Karnataka
- Lok Sabha constituency: Bidar
- Established: 1951
- Total electors: 245,996
- Reservation: None

Member of Legislative Assembly
- 16th Karnataka Legislative Assembly
- Incumbent Dr. Siddu Patil
- Party: Bharatiya Janata Party
- Elected year: 2023
- Preceded by: Rajashekhar Basavaraj Patil

Humnabad Assembly constituency is one of the seats in Karnataka Legislative Assembly in India. It is a part of Bidar Lok Sabha constituency.

Siddu Patil is the current MLA from Humnabad.

== Members of the Legislative Assembly ==
Election	Member	Party
1952	Srinivas Rao	Indian National Congress
1952	Shankar Dev	Indian National Congress
1957	Murlidhar Rao	Indian National Congress
1962	Gopal Rao Mudbi	Indian National Congress
1967	V. N. Patil Neelappa	Communist Party of India
1972	V. N. Patil Neelappa	Communist Party of India
1978	Basavaraj Havgiappa Patil	Janata Party
1983	Basavaraj Havgiappa Patil	Indian National Congress
1985	Basavaraj Havgiappa Patil	Indian National Congress
1989	Basavaraj Havgiappa Patil	Indian National Congress
1994	Merajuddin Patel	Janata Dal
1999	Subhash Kallur	Bharatiya Janata Party
2003 By-election (Note: Election of Subhash Kallur declared void.)	Rajashekar Patil	Indian National Congress
2004	Merajuddin Patel	Janata Dal
2008	Rajashekar Patil	Indian National Congress
2013	Rajashekar Patil	Indian National Congress
2018	Rajashekar Patil	Indian National Congress
2023	Siddu Patil	Bharatiya Janata Party

== Election results ==
=== Assembly Election 2023 ===
2023 Karnataka Legislative Assembly election : Humnabad
Party	Candidate	Votes	%	±%
BJP	Siddu Patil	75,515	42.23	▲15.16
INC	Rajashekar Patil	73,921	41.34	▼5.70
JD(S)	C. M. Faiz	25,900	14.48	▼7.03
AAP	Bank Reddy	1,413	0.79	New
NOTA	None of the above	729	0.41	▼0.33
Margin of victory		1,594	0.89	▼19.08
Turnout		178,981	72.76	▲5.98
Total valid votes		178,807		
Registered electors		245,996		▲3.09
BJP gain from INC		Swing	▼4.81	

=== Assembly Election 2018 ===
2018 Karnataka Legislative Assembly election : Humnabad
Party	Candidate	Votes	%	±%
INC	Rajashekar Patil	74,945	47.04	▼4.77
BJP	Subhash	43,131	27.07	▲21.78
JD(S)	M. Naseemoddin Patel	34,280	21.51	▼10.68
BRP	Ankush	3,644	2.29	New
NOTA	None of the above	1,173	0.74	New
Margin of victory		31,814	19.97	▲0.35
Turnout		159,362	66.78	▲0.74
Total valid votes		159,335		
Registered electors		238,628		▲15.76
INC hold		Swing	▼4.77	

=== Assembly Election 2013 ===
2013 Karnataka Legislative Assembly election : Humnabad
Party	Candidate	Votes	%	±%
INC	Rajashekar Patil	64,694	51.81	▲8.84
JD(S)	M. Naseemoddin Patel	40,194	32.19	▲9.77
BSP	Ankush Lingappa Chitta	8,093	6.48	▲0.69
BJP	Padmakar Patil	6,604	5.29	▼18.85
KJP	Meer Ashreefali Meer Syedali	5,695	4.56	New
BSRCP	Bankreddy Prabhureddy	5,238	4.20	New
Independent	Ravikanth. K. Hugar	2,076	1.66	New
NPP	Ismail Maheboobsab	1,164	0.93	New
Margin of victory		24,500	19.62	▲0.79
Turnout		136,134	66.04	▲6.87
Total valid votes		124,857		
Registered electors		206,145		▲5.46
INC hold		Swing	▲8.84	

=== Assembly Election 2008 ===
2008 Karnataka Legislative Assembly election : Humnabad
Party	Candidate	Votes	%	±%
INC	Rajashekar Patil	49,603	42.97	▲11.08
BJP	Subhash Kallur	27,867	24.14	▼5.62
JD(S)	Merajuddin Patel	25,883	22.42	▼11.53
BSP	Jaganath Ramchander Jamadar	6,680	5.79	New
Independent	Ravi Kalappa Hugar	1,935	1.68	New
Independent	Baswaraj Pailwan	1,171	1.01	New
National Development Party	Advocate Moulvi Zameeroddin	894	0.77	New
Independent	Narsappa Lachappa Muttangi	817	0.71	New
Margin of victory		21,736	18.83	▲16.77
Turnout		115,656	59.17	▲0.81
Total valid votes		115,446		
Registered electors		195,466		▲8.15
INC gain from JD(S)		Swing	▲9.02	

=== Assembly Election 2004 ===
2004 Karnataka Legislative Assembly election : Humnabad
Party	Candidate	Votes	%	±%
JD(S)	Merajuddin Patel	35,755	33.95	▼246.57
INC	Rajashekar Patil	33,586	31.89	▼337.44
BJP	Subhash Kallur	31,335	29.76	▼246.15
Kannada Nadu Party	Nabi Patel Farid Patel	1,216	1.15	New
Independent	Mallikarjun Kamanna Sirsi	893	0.85	New
JP	Shobha Rani	632	0.60	New
Margin of victory		2,169	2.06	▼86.75
Turnout		105,480	58.36	▲52.44
Total valid votes		105,302		
Registered electors		180,737		▲1.89
JD(S) gain from INC		Swing	▼335.38	

=== Assembly By-election 2003 ===
2003 Karnataka Legislative Assembly by-election : Humnabad
Party	Candidate	Votes	%	±%
INC	Rajashekar Patil	38,758	36.93	▲33.65
JD(S)	Merajuddin Patel	29,438	28.05	▲25.36
BJP	Subhash Kallur	28,954	27.59	▲23.94
Independent	Moulana Sab	2,238	21.33	New
BSP	S. Ramchander	1,910	18.20	▲17.54
Independent	Bhaskara Babu. P	947	9.02	New
Margin of victory		9,320	88.81	▲85.14
Turnout		10,494	5.92	▼60.57
Total valid votes		10,494		
Registered electors		177,389		▲16.80
INC gain from BJP		Swing	▲332.89	

=== Assembly Election 1999 ===
1999 Karnataka Legislative Assembly election : Humnabad
Party	Candidate	Votes	%	±%
BJP	Subhash Kallur	35,438	36.44	▲13.47
INC	Rajashekar Patil	31,868	32.77	▲6.79
JD(S)	Merajuddin Patel	26,099	26.84	New
Independent	Devendrakumar	2,166	2.23	New
Independent	Sudershan Madeppa Malge	766	0.79	New
BSP	Shakeel Ahmed Shamman	643	0.66	▼1.75
Margin of victory		3,570	3.67	▼0.96
Turnout		100,980	66.49	▲1.13
Total valid votes		97,243		
Rejected ballots		3,520	3.49	▲0.84
Registered electors		151,874		▲15.05
BJP gain from JD		Swing	▲5.83	

=== Assembly Election 1994 ===
1994 Karnataka Legislative Assembly election : Humnabad
Party	Candidate	Votes	%	±%
JD	Merajuddin Patel	25,704	30.61	▲0.98
INC	Basavaraj Havgiappa Patil	21,816	25.98	▼16.20
BJP	Subhash Kallur	19,288	22.97	▲12.28
INC	Shrikant Rai	10,465	12.46	New
Kranti Sabha	Madivalappa Huche	2,042	2.43	▲1.80
BSP	Ghaleppa Master	2,025	2.41	New
JP	Kalyanrao Shamrao Patil	1,318	1.57	New
Margin of victory		3,888	4.63	▼7.92
Turnout		86,271	65.36	▲4.02
Total valid votes		83,981		
Rejected ballots		2,286	2.65	▼4.32
Registered electors		132,003		▲7.30
JD gain from INC		Swing	▼11.57	

=== Assembly Election 1989 ===
1989 Karnataka Legislative Assembly election : Humnabad
Party	Candidate	Votes	%	±%
INC	Basavaraj Havgiappa Patil	29,610	42.18	▼7.34
JD	Basheeruddin Yousufoddin	20,801	29.63	New
BJP	Manik Rao Bhim Rao	7,501	10.69	New
CPI	V. N. Patil Neelappa	3,670	5.23	New
JP	Sharnappabaswanappa	3,542	5.05	New
Independent	Ram Chandra Tippayya	2,014	2.87	New
Independent	Narsappa Lachappa Muttangi	1,586	2.26	New
Independent	Mohuiddin Shabuddin	480	0.68	New
Kranti Sabha	Veergonda Sharnagonda	444	0.63	New
Margin of victory		8,809	12.55	▲4.13
Turnout		75,461	61.34	▲5.97
Total valid votes		70,200		
Rejected ballots		5,261	6.97	▲4.48
Registered electors		123,028		▲27.69
INC hold		Swing	▼7.34	

=== Assembly Election 1985 ===
1985 Karnataka Legislative Assembly election : Humnabad
Party	Candidate	Votes	%	±%
INC	Basavaraj Havgiappa Patil	25,763	49.52	▼4.21
JP	Dayanandrao Chandrabhanu	21,380	41.10	▲27.60
Independent	Narsappa Lachappa Muttangi	1,881	3.62	New
Independent	Md. Hisamuddin Yeseensab	1,166	2.24	New
Independent	Syed Iseamiyan Syed Yakhubmiyan	889	1.71	New
Independent	Bhojappa Sambanna	713	1.37	New
Margin of victory		4,383	8.42	▼15.72
Turnout		53,350	55.37	▼3.58
Total valid votes		52,024		
Rejected ballots		1,326	2.49	▼0.19
Registered electors		96,350		▲11.96
INC hold		Swing	▼4.21	

=== Assembly Election 1983 ===
1983 Karnataka Legislative Assembly election : Humnabad
Party	Candidate	Votes	%	±%
INC	Basavaraj Havgiappa Patil	26,528	53.73	▲36.40
BJP	Manik Rao	14,611	29.59	New
JP	Kishan Rao Gunderao	6,667	13.50	▼16.17
Independent	M. Babu Patrapalli	1,128	2.28	New
Independent	S. N. Vaidyaraj	438	0.89	New
Margin of victory		11,917	24.14	▲20.71
Turnout		50,730	58.95	▼9.21
Total valid votes		49,372		
Rejected ballots		1,358	2.68	▲0.07
Registered electors		86,056		▲4.85
INC gain from JP		Swing	▲24.06	

=== Assembly Election 1978 ===
1978 Karnataka Legislative Assembly election : Humnabad
Party	Candidate	Votes	%	±%
JP	Basavaraj Havgiappa Patil	16,167	29.67	New
CPI	V. N. Patil Neelappa	14,297	26.24	▼7.71
INC	Narendra Madivalappa Kheni	9,442	17.33	New
Independent	Dilipkumar Baswaraj	6,916	12.69	New
Independent	Abdul Shukoor Shaikh Mahboob	4,609	8.46	New
Independent	Narsappa Lachappa Muttangi	2,084	3.83	New
Independent	Zereppa Thukappa	465	0.85	New
Margin of victory		1,870	3.43	▲2.39
Turnout		55,942	68.16	▲10.89
Total valid votes		54,481		
Rejected ballots		1,461	2.61	▲2.61
Registered electors		82,077		▲7.86
JP gain from CPI		Swing	▼4.28	

=== Assembly Election 1972 ===
1972 Mysore State Legislative Assembly election : Humnabad
Party	Candidate	Votes	%	±%
CPI	V. N. Patil Neelappa	14,376	33.95	▼11.98
INC(O)	Manik Rao Ramanna	13,935	32.91	New
Independent	Basavaraj Havgiappa Patil	13,175	31.11	New
Independent	Narsappa Lachappa Muttangi	860	2.03	New
Margin of victory		441	1.04	▼3.35
Turnout		43,584	57.27	▼2.80
Total valid votes		42,346		
Registered electors		76,097		▲22.80
CPI hold		Swing	▼11.98	

=== Assembly Election 1967 ===
1967 Mysore State Legislative Assembly election : Humnabad
Party	Candidate	Votes	%	±%
CPI	V. N. Patil Neelappa	16,019	45.93	▼3.46
INC	G. M. Kheny	14,488	41.54	▼9.07
PSP	K. R. G. Rao	3,345	9.59	New
Independent	R. Sangappa	1,025	2.94	New
Margin of victory		1,531	4.39	▲3.18
Turnout		37,225	60.07	▲9.63
Total valid votes		34,877		
Registered electors		61,970		▲30.00
CPI gain from INC		Swing	▼4.68	

=== Assembly Election 1962 ===
1962 Mysore State Legislative Assembly election : Humnabad
Party	Candidate	Votes	%	±%
INC	Gopal Rao Mudbi	11,476	50.61	▲5.09
CPI	Vishwanath	11,201	49.39	New
Margin of victory		275	1.21	▼14.27
Turnout		24,047	50.44	▲7.47
Total valid votes		22,677		
Registered electors		47,670		▲17.69
INC hold		Swing	▲5.09	

=== Assembly Election 1957 ===
1957 Mysore State Legislative Assembly election : Humnabad
Party	Candidate	Votes	%	±%
INC	Murlidhar Rao	7,923	45.52	▼23.88
Independent	Vishwanath	5,229	30.04	New
PSP	Bidap. R. V	4,253	24.44	New
Margin of victory		2,694	15.48	▼11.42
Turnout		17,405	42.97	▼47.44
Total valid votes		17,405		
Registered electors		40,504		▼56.49
INC hold		Swing	▲10.64	

=== Assembly Election 1952 ===
1952 Hyderabad State Legislative Assembly election : Humnabad
Party	Candidate	Votes	%	±%
INC	Srinivas Rao	29,354	34.88	New
INC	Shankar Dev	29,058	34.53	New
Socialist Party (India)	Malikarjun	6,715	7.98	New
SCF	G. Vithal Rao Kamble	5,661	6.73	New
Socialist Party (India)	Bidap. R. V	4,611	5.48	New
PDF	Laxman Rao	3,556	4.23	New
PDF	Hakikat Rao	2,893	3.44	New
HSDCA	Narsing Lalappa	2,316	2.75	New
Margin of victory		22,639	26.90	
Turnout		84,164	45.20	
Total valid votes		84,164		
Registered electors		93,093		
INC win (new seat)				

== See also ==
- List of constituencies of Karnataka Legislative Assembly
