= Agaram Agraharam =

TMG Kotta Thirumalagownikotta
- village
- Interactive map of TMG Kotta
- Country: India
- State: Tamil Nadu
- District: Krishnagiri

Languages
  - Official: Tamil
- Time zone: UTC+5:30 (IST)

Agaram Agraharam is a village in the Hosur taluk of Krishnagiri district, Tamil Nadu, India. Located there is Abaya Hastha Swayambu Sri Lakshmi Narasimha Swamy Temple
