= Shravana Putrada Ekadashi =

Hindu holy day

Putrada Ekadashi
- Also called: Shravana Putrada Ekadashi, Pavitropana Ekadashi, Pavitra Ekadashi
- Observed by: Hindus
- Type: Hindu
- Significance: Fasting day
- Observances: Prayers and religious rituals, including puja to Vishnu
- Date: Decided by the lunar calendar

Shravana Putrada Ekadashi, also known as Pavitropana Ekadashi and Pavitra Ekadashi, is a Hindu holy day, which falls on the 11th lunar day (ekadashi) of the fortnight of the waxing moon in the Hindu month of Shravana which in the Gregorian calendar falls in July or August.

This day is known as Shravana Putrada Ekadashi, to differentiate it from the other Putrada Ekadashi in Pausha (December–January), which is also called Pausha Putrada Ekadashi.

On this day, 24 hours fasting is observed and worship is offered to the god Vishnu (like other ekadashis) by both husband and wife in particular, who do not have a son for a long time after marriage, to beget a male child. This day is especially observed by Vaishnavas, followers of Vishnu.

A son is considered entirely important in society as he takes care of the parents in their old age in life and by offering shraddha (ancestor rites) ensures well-being of his parents in the after-life. While each ekadashi has a separate name and is prescribed for certain goals, the goal of having sons is so great that two Putrada ("giver of sons") ekadashis are devoted to it. Rest of the goals do not enjoy this privilege.

== Legend ==
The legend about Pavitropana Ekadashi is narrated by the god Krishna to the King Yudhishthira in the Bhavishya Purana. King Mahijit was a rich and powerful ruler of Mahishmati, who had no children. He sought counsel of his council of learned men, sages (rishis) and Brahmins (priests), to find a solution to his problem. Unable to find a remedy, the council reached out to the omniscient learned sage Lomesh. Lomesh meditated found out that Mahijit's misfortune was a result of his sins in his previous birth. The sage said that Mahijit was a merchant in his previous birth. While travelling on business, the merchant became extremely thirsty once and reached the pond. There a cow and her calf were drinking water. The merchant drove them away and himself drank the water. This sin resulted in his childlessness, while his good deeds resulted in his birth as a king of a peaceful kingdom. Lomesh advised the King and the Queen to observe Ekadashi fast in Shravana on Pavitropana Ekadashi to get rid of his sin. As advised, the royal couple as well as his citizens kept a fast and offered prayers to the god Vishnu and kept vigil throughout the night piously chanting his divine name. They also gave gifts of gold, jewels, clothes and money to the Learned. Their wish was fulfilled when a handsome son was born to them to subsequently become the heir to their kingdom.

== Worship ==
Worship of Vishnu is a common rite on all Ekadashi days including the Putrada Ekadashi to get salvation and get rid of all sins, to beget children (sons in particular). On this day devotees keeping fast to beget a son, sleep in the room where god Vishnu is worshipped. On this occasion giving gifts to Brahmins in the form of money, food, clothes etc. is also an accepted practice. This Shravana Putrada Ekadashi is more popular in states other than the North India, while the Pausha one is popular in the North.

Starting with the Pavitropanna Ekadashi, Jhulan Yatra festival, a five-day event, is observed till the Poornima (full moon day). The festivities involve decorating the jhula or swing with beautiful flowers and creepers. On the last day, worship is offered to the colourfully dressed small images of the god Krishna and his consort Radha placed in the swing.
