= Mokshada Ekadashi =

Hindu observance

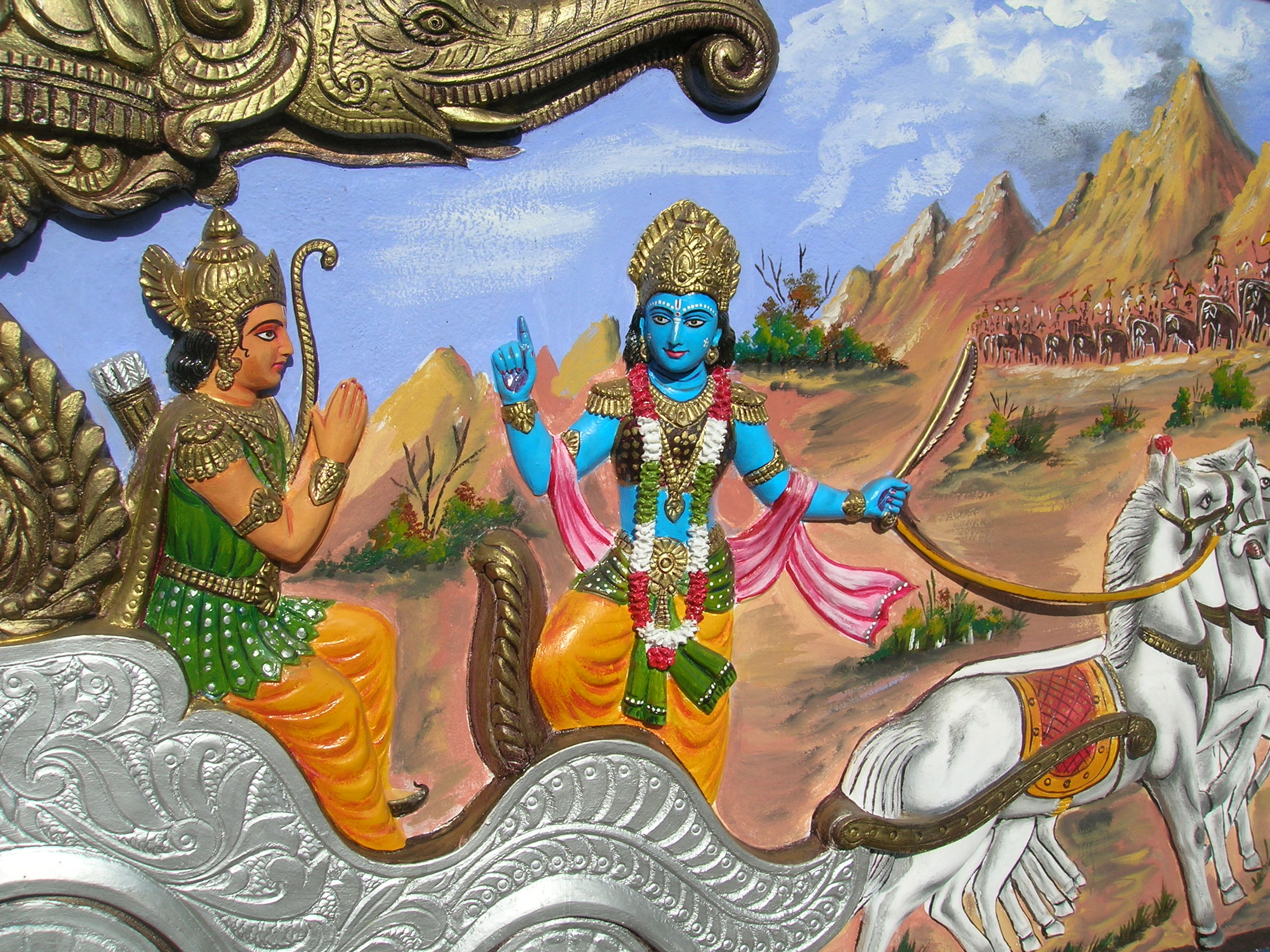
- The day Krishna delivers the Bhagavad Gita to Arjuna in the battlefield of Kurukshetra
- Also called: Margashirsha Mokshada Ekadashi day
- Observed by: Hindus
- Type: Hindu
- Significance: This vrat is believed to liberate the soul from the cycle of birth and death
- Observances: Prayers and religious rituals, including puja to Vishnu and Krishna
- Date: Agrahayana, Shukla, Ekadashi

Mokshada Ekadashi (Sanskrit: मोक्षदा एकादशी, romanized: Mokṣadā Ekādaśī, lit. 'The eleventh day of moksha') is a Hindu holy day, which falls on the 11th lunar day (ekadashi) of the fortnight of the waxing moon in the Hindu month of Margashirsha (Agrahayana), corresponding to November–December. Hindus, particularly Vaishnavas, observe a 24-hour fast in honour of the deity Krishna, an avatar of Vishnu.

Mokshada Ekadashi is an auspicious day dedicated to worship of Vishnu for liberation from sins, and to achieve moksha (liberation) after death. It is celebrated on the same day as Gita Jayanti, the day when Krishna gave the holy sermon of the Bhagavad Gita to Arjuna, as described in the Hindu epic Mahabharata. The 700-verse Bhagavad Gita told at the beginning of the climactic Mahabharata War between the Pandavas and their cousins, the Kauravas at Kurukshetra, deals with a variety of Hindu philosophical ideas.

== Legend ==
The legend about Mokshada Ekadashi is narrated by the god Krishna to the Pandava King Yudhishthira in the Brahmanda Purana and the Padma Purana. Once, a saintly king called Vaikhanasa ruled in the city of Champaka. One night, the king had a dream, where he saw his forefathers being tormented in Naraka (Hell) who begged the king to liberate them. The king was highly anguished and related this nightmare to the Brahmins of his council the next day. He sought their advice as to how to free his ancestors from tortures of Naraka, and grant them moksha (salvation). The council advised the king to approach the omniscient saint, Parvata Muni (sage of the mountain). The sage meditated and found the reason for the hellish torture of the king's father. He stated that his father had committed the sin of not fulfilling his sexual duty to his wife while she was ovulating, choosing to visit a village instead. As a solution to rectify the situation, the sage suggested to the king to observe vrata (vow) of the Mokshada Ekadashi day. On Moksha Ekadashi, the king observed the vrata with a complete fast along with his wife, children, and relatives with full faith and devotion. The king's religious merit (obtained from the vrata) pleased the devas of Svarga, who carried the king's father to their heaven. Mokshada Ekadashi is compared with the chintamani, the gem that yields all desires. Special merit is said to be achieved by the vrata, by which one can elevate someone from hell to heaven, or attain salvation himself.

== Practices ==
The complete fast from sunrise on Mokshada Ekadashi to the dawn the next day is observed. People who cannot fast for that period observe a partial fast. Only vegetarian food, especially fruits, vegetables, milk products and nuts, are consumed. Eating rice, beans, pulses, garlic, and onions is prohibited on this day.

Like most ekadashis, the rites involve worship and prayers to Vishnu. On this day, the avatar Krishna is also worshipped. Devotees properly observing the fast are believed to attain moksha after death.

== See also ==
- Vaikuntha Chaturdashi
- Vaikuntha Ekadashi
- Vrata
