= Pausha Putrada Ekadashi =

Hindu observance

Putrada Ekadashi
- Also called: Pausha Putrada Ekadashi
- Observed by: Hindus
- Type: Hindu
- Significance: For having a son
- Observances: Prayers and religious rituals, including puja to Vishnu
- Date: Decided by the lunar calendar

Putrada Ekadashi (lit. "ekadashi that is the giver of sons") is a Hindu holy day, which falls on the 11th lunar day (ekadashi) of the fortnight of the waxing moon in the Hindu month of Pausha (December–January). This day is also known as Pausha Putrada Ekadashi, to differentiate it from the other Putrada Ekadashi in Shravana (July–August), which is also called Shravana Putrada Ekadashi. Couples fast on this day and worship the god Vishnu for a good son. This day is especially observed by Vaishnavas, followers of Vishnu. A son is considered entirely important in Hindu society as he takes care of the parents in their old age in life and by offering shraddha (ancestor rites) ensures well-being of his parents in the after-life. While each ekadashi is prescribed for certain goals, the goal of having sons is so great that two Putrada .("giver of sons") ekadashis are devoted to it. This year it will be observed on 5 th of August in 2025 and another ekadashi will be obsreved on 30th o December . Rest of the goals do not enjoy this privilege.

== Legend ==
The Bhavishya Purana reveals the tale of Putrada Ekadashi narrated by Lord Krishna to king Yudhishthira. Once, king of Bhadravati, Suketuman and his queen Shaibya were grieved by the absence of progeny. The couple as well as their dead ancestors were worried that without some one to offer shraddha, they will not be at peace and will become lost souls after death. Frustrated, the king left his kingdom and went to the forest unbeknownst to everyone. After wandering the forest for days, Suketuman reached the ashram of some sages on the bank of Lake Manasarovar on Putrada Ekadashi. The sages revealed that they were the ten divine Vishvadevas. They advised the king to observe the Putrada Ekadashi fast to attain a son. The king complied and returned to the kingdom. Soon, the king was blessed by a son, who grew up to become a heroic king.

== Practices ==
Women who long for a son fast and pray to Vishnu on Putrada Ekadashi. Couples also worship the deity for well-being for their children. Grains, beans, cereals, and certain vegetables and spices are avoided on this day. This Pausha Putrada Ekadashi is more popular in North India, while other states give more importance to the Shravana one.
