= Ekadashi =

Eleventh day of the lunar fortnight

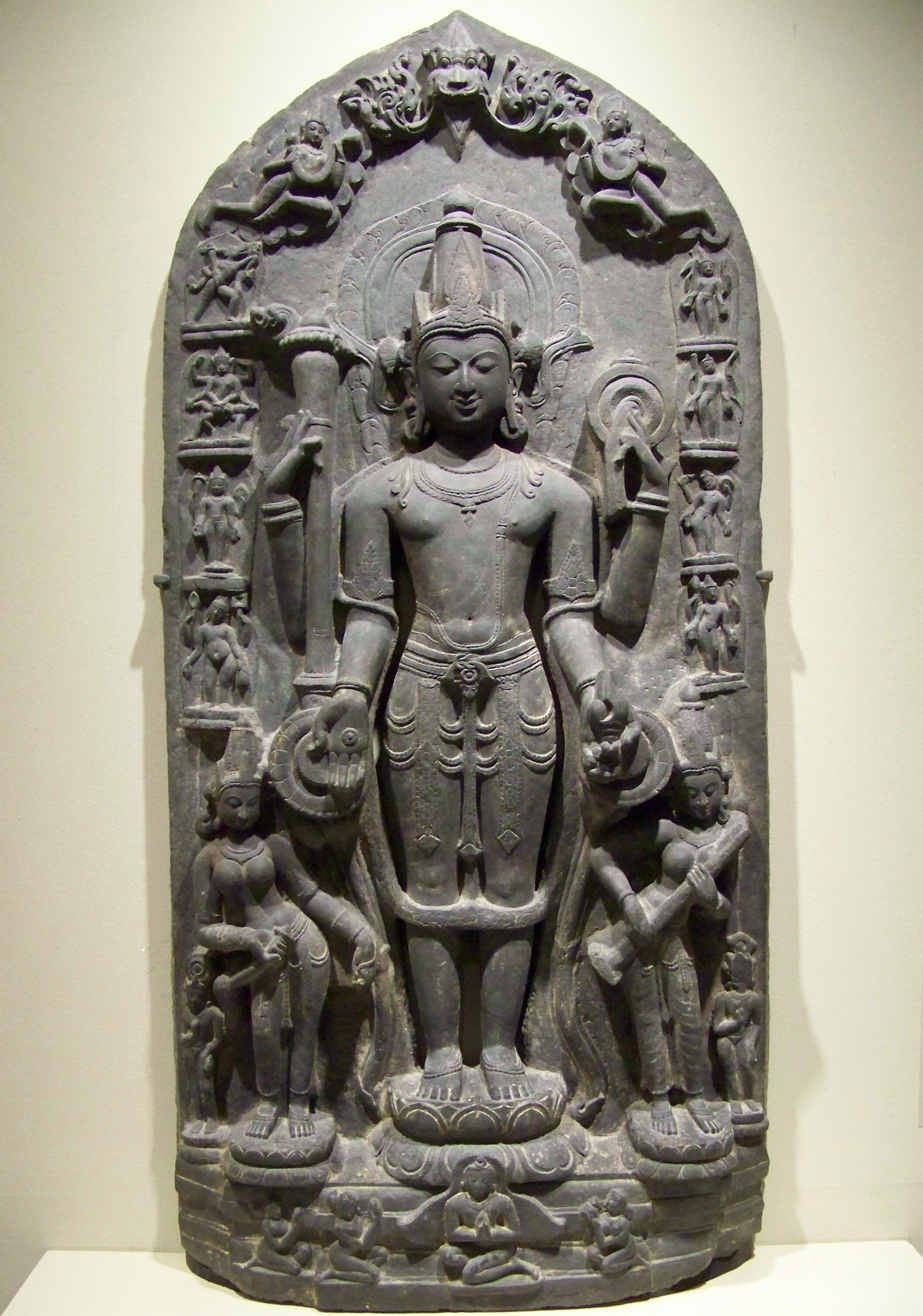
Ekadashis are associated with the worship of the god Vishnu, patron of the Vaishnavism sect.

Ekadashi (Sanskrit: एकादशी, romanized: Ēkādaśī, lit. 'The eleventh day') is the eleventh lunar day (tithi) of the waxing (Shukla Pakṣa) and waning (Kṛṣṇa Pakṣa) lunar cycles in the Vedic calendar month. Ekadashi is popularly observed within Vaishnavism, one of the major paths within Sanatana Dharma, commonly known as Hinduism. Followers offer their worship to the god Vishnu by fasting or just symbolically; the idea was always to receive self-discipline and the benefits of fasting and it was connected to the way of life via Sanatana Dharma practices.

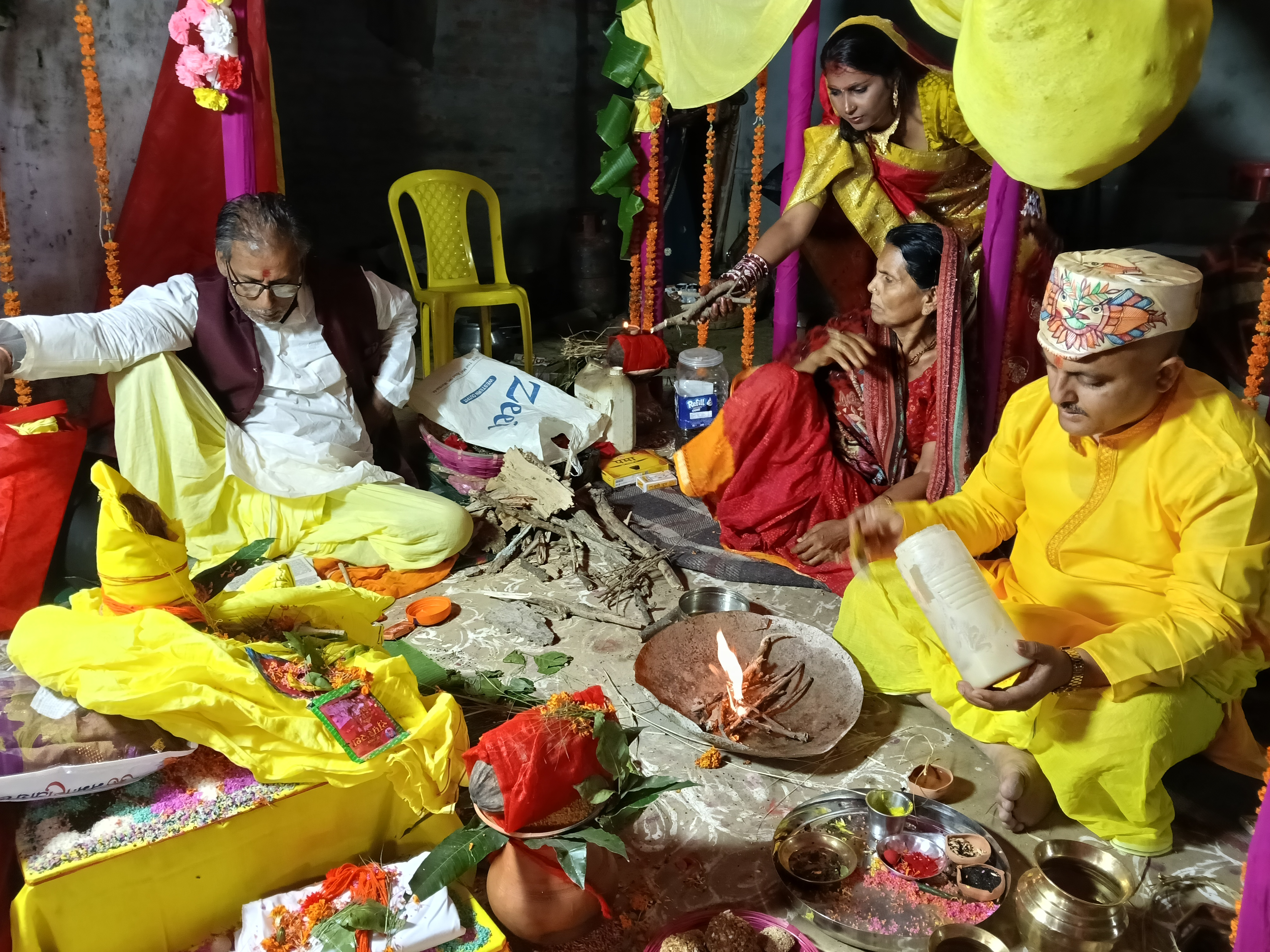
View of a Ekadashi Jag (Yajna) conducted at a marwa mandap of Maithil Upanayan in Basuki Bihari village of the Mithila region in India.

In Hinduism, the primary purpose of fasting on Ekadashi is to gain control over the mind and bodily senses, and channel it towards spiritual progression. In addition, there are several health benefits to fasting. Ekadashi fasting spans three days. Devotees take a single meal in the afternoon a day before Ekadashi day(Dasami) to make sure there is no residual food in the stomach on the next day. Devotees keep a strict fast with no food or water on Ekadashi day and break the fast on the next day(Dwadashi) only after sunrise. Since this form of fasting is very stringent and may not be possible for people in all walks of life due to health and life choice reasons, a more liberal form of fasting is followed by most devotees.

There are different ways to observe the Ekadashi fasting in this method, ranging from complete abstention from food and water to partial fasting or consuming only specific types of food. Devotee can choose the fasting approach that aligns with his/her health, lifestyle, and spiritual goals.

1. Nirjala: Devotees observe complete fasting without even water on Ekadashi day.
2. Jalahar: In this type of Ekadashi fasting, devotees consume only water.
3. Ksheerbhoji: In this type of Ekadashi fasting, devotees consume milk and milk products.
4. Phalahari: In this type of Ekadashi fasting, the devotees consume only fruits.
5. Naktabhoji: In this type of Ekadashi fasting, the devotees have single meal. Generally, in the later part of the day with dishes made of Sabudana, Singhada, Shakarkand (Yam), Potatoes and Groundnuts. However, the meal should not have any grains like rice, wheat, millets or legumes like dals and beans.

The timing of each ekadashi is according to the position of the moon. The Hindu calendar marks progression from a full moon to a new moon as divided into fifteen equal arcs of 12°. Each arc measures one lunar day, called a tithi. The time it takes the moon to traverse a particular distance is the length of that lunar day. Ekadashi refers to the 11th tithi, or lunar day. The eleventh tithi corresponds to a precise angle and phase of the waxing and waning moon. In the bright half of the lunar month, the moon will be exactly 3/4 full on the start of Ekadashi, and in the dark half of the lunar month, the moon will be 3/4 dark on the start of Ekadashi.

There are usually 24 Ekadashis in a calendar year. Occasionally, there are two extra Ekadashis that happen in a Hindu leap year. Each Ekadashi day is purported to have particular benefits that are attained by the performance of specific activities.

Bhagavata Purana (skandha IX, adhyaay 4) notes the observation of Ekadashi by Ambarisha, a devotee of Vishnu.

== Legend ==
The story behind Ekadashi began with Vishnu sleeping or in a meditative state. A demon, Murdanav, approached and attempted to attack Vishnu. At that time, a beautiful woman sprung forth from Vishnu's 11th sense (often called the "mind"). An infatuated Murdanav asked to marry her, to which she responded that she would agree only if he defeated her in battle. As they fought, Murdanav was eventually killed. Vishnu awoke from his sleep, and blessed the woman by naming her "Ekadashi", and stated that if anyone were to fast on this day, along with concentrating all his 11 senses (5 - Gyan indriya 5 - Karma Indriya and 1 - Mann, Mind), they would attain moksha (liberation from the cycle of birth and death).

== List of Ekadashis ==
The table below describes the types of ekadashi's and when they fall in the year.

Vedic lunar month	Presiding deity	Krishna paksha ekadashi	Shukla paksha ekadashi	2024 Dates
Chaitra (चैत्र, March–April)	Rama/Vishnu	Papavimocani Ekadashi	Kamada Ekadashi	Papmochani/Papavimocani Ekadashi: 4-5 April Kamada Ekadashi: 18-19 April (Note: Fasting may begin several days before) (17-18 April in some traditions)
Vaisakha (वैशाख, April–May)	Madhusudana (Vishnu)	Varuthini Ekadashi	Mohini Ekadashi	Varuthini Ekadashi: 3-4 May Mohini Ekadashi: 18-19 May
Jyeshtha (ज्येष्ठ, May–June)	Trivikrama (Vishnu)	Apara Ekadashi	Nirjala Ekadashi	Vaishnava Apara & Apara Ekadashi: 2-3 June Nirjala Ekadashi: 17-18 June
Ashada (आषाढ, June–July)	Vamana	Yogini Ekadashi	Shayani Ekadashi	Yogini Ekadashi: : 1-2 July Devshayani (Shayani) Ekadashi: 16-17 July (15 -16 July in some traditions)
Shravana (श्रावण, July–August)	Sridhara	Kamika Ekadashi	Shravana Putrada Ekadashi	Kamika Ekadashi: 30-31 July Shravana Putrada Ekadashi: 04-05 August
Bhadrapada (भाद्रपद, August–September)	Hrishikesha	Annada Ekadashi	Parsva Ekadashi	Aja (Annada) Ekadashi: 29-30 August Parsva Ekadashi: 13-14 September
Ashvina (अश्विन्, September–October)	Padmanabha	Indra Ekadashi	Pasankusa Ekadashi	Indira (Indra) Ekadashi: 27-28 September Papankusha Ekadashi: 13-14 October
Kartik (कार्तिक, October–November)	Damodara	Rama Ekadashi	Prabodhini Ekadashi	Rama Ekadashi: 27-28 October Devutthana Ekadashi: 11-12 November
Margashirsha(Agrahayana) (मार्गशीर्ष, November–December)	Keshava	Utpanna Ekadashi	Mokshada Ekadashi/Vaikuntha Ekadashi	Utpanna Ekadashi: 26-27 November Mokshada & Guruvayur(Vaikuntha) Ekadashi: 11-12 December
Pausha (पौष, December–January)	Narayana (Vishnu/Krishna)	Saphala Ekadashi	Pausha Putrada Ekadashi/Vaikuntha Ekadashi	Saphala Ekadashi: 7-8 January (11 -12 January in Eastern Traditions) Pausha Putrada Ekadashi: 20-21 January
Magha (माघ, January–February)	Madhava	Shattila Ekadashi	Bhaimi Ekadashi / Jaya Ekadashi	Shattila Ekadashi: 5-6 February; Bhaimi/Jaya Ekadashi: 19-20 February
Phalguna (फाल्गुन, February–March)	Govinda (Krishna)	Vijaya Ekadashi	Amalaki Ekadashi	Vaishnava Vijaya & Vijaya Ekadashi: 6-7 March (4 -5 March in some traditions) Amalaki Ekadashi: 20-21 March
Adhika Masa (अधिक, once in 2–3 years)	Purushottama	Padmini Vishuddha Ekadashi	Parama Shuddha Ekadashi	

== Ekadashi Seva ==
Ekadashi is a sacred fasting day observed twice a month in the Vaishnava tradition, dedicated to Lord Vishnu and Lord Krishna. At the Hare Krishna Golden Temple, Ekadashi is observed with special devotion, prayers, and spiritual services (seva). Devotees participate in chanting, fasting, and offering seva to seek spiritual purification and divine blessings.

== See also ==
- Guruvayur Ekadasi
- Amavasya
- Purnima
- Sevayat
