= Humnabad =

Humnabad Jayasimha Nagar
- City
- Location in Karnataka, India
- Coordinates: 17.77°N 77.13°E
- Country: India
- State: Karnataka
- District: Bidar district
- Region: Kalyana-Karnataka
- Founder: Jayasimha

Government
  - Type: Town Municipal Council (TMC)
  - Body: Humnabad Town Municipal Council
  - MLA: Siddu Nagbushan Patil
  - President of Municipal Council: Kasturbai Narsing
  - Vice President of Municipal Council: Satyavati Somayya

Area
  - Total: 6.8 km^{2} (2.6 sq mi)
- Elevation: 638 m (2,093 ft)

Population (2015)
  - Total: 95,735
  - Density: 14,112/km^{2} (36,550/sq mi)
- Demonym(s): HBDians, Humnabadnivaru

Languages
  - Official Language: Kannada
- Time zone: UTC+5:30 (IST)
- Pin code: 585330
- Vehicle registration: KA-39
- Nearest City: Bidar
- Major Highways: NH 65; NH 50
- Website: humnabadtown.mrc.gov.in

Humnabad, also known as Jayasimha Nagar, is a city and municipal council in the Bidar District of the Indian state of Karnataka. Humnabad is the headquarters of Humnabad taluk. It is well-known for the Veerabhadreswar Temple, located midway, at a distance of 60 km from both Bidar and Kalaburgi districts. It is well connected by roadways and railway network. It is connected by two national highways, NH 50 and NH 65.

== Geography ==
Humnabad is located at 17.77°N 77.13°E. It has an average elevation of 638 metres (2093 feet). Humnabad consists of 112 villages and 34 panchayats.

== Demographics ==
As of 2019, Humnabad had a population of 3,32,362. Males constituted 51% of the population and females 49%. Kannada is the most spoken language of Humnabad.

Religions in Humnabad
Religion	Percent
Hindu	64.32%
Muslim	33.48%
Christians	0.60%
Sikh	0.03%
Buddhist	0.26%
Jain	0.02%
Others†	0.01%
Not Stated	0.29%

== Significance ==
Humnabad is known for its rich heritage of temples and proximity to Telangana and Maharashtra. It is known for Shri Veerabhadreshwar Temple, Jai Bhavani Temple, Shri Manik Prabhu Devasthanam temple is dedicated to a great ascetic.

== Religious centers ==
The Manik Prabhu Temple is located on the confluence of two holy rivulets Viraja and Guru Ganga, Banashankari Temple in Nandgaon village. Every year on 26 January, 12 days Shri Veerbhadreshwara jatra Mohotsav is celebrated devotees visit and take darshan many people come from North Karnataka, Maharashtra (MH), Andhra, Telangana.

== Notable people ==
- Basavaraj Havgiappa Patil (three time MLA and MLC, Minister of Karnataka)
- Ramchandra Veerappa
- Rajashekar Patil
- Merajuddin Patel
- Manikappa Gada
- Doctor Manikrao Patil
- Ramchandra Chidri
- Veerpakshappa Agadi
- Somanna Maroor
- Siddu Patil
- Subhash Kallur

== Transport ==
Humnabad is connected by two national highways NH-65 and State Highway NH-218. In fact, NH 218 begins from Humnabad itself. Now, NH-9 is rechristened as NH-65. Also, new railway line is laid from Bidar to Gulbarga and regular train services have started from Bidar to Gulbarga via Humanabad.

== See also ==
- Aurad
- Basavakalyan
- Bhalki
- Bidar
