= Dharam Singh ministry =

Government of Karnataka, India (2004–06)

- 24th Ministry of the State of Karnataka
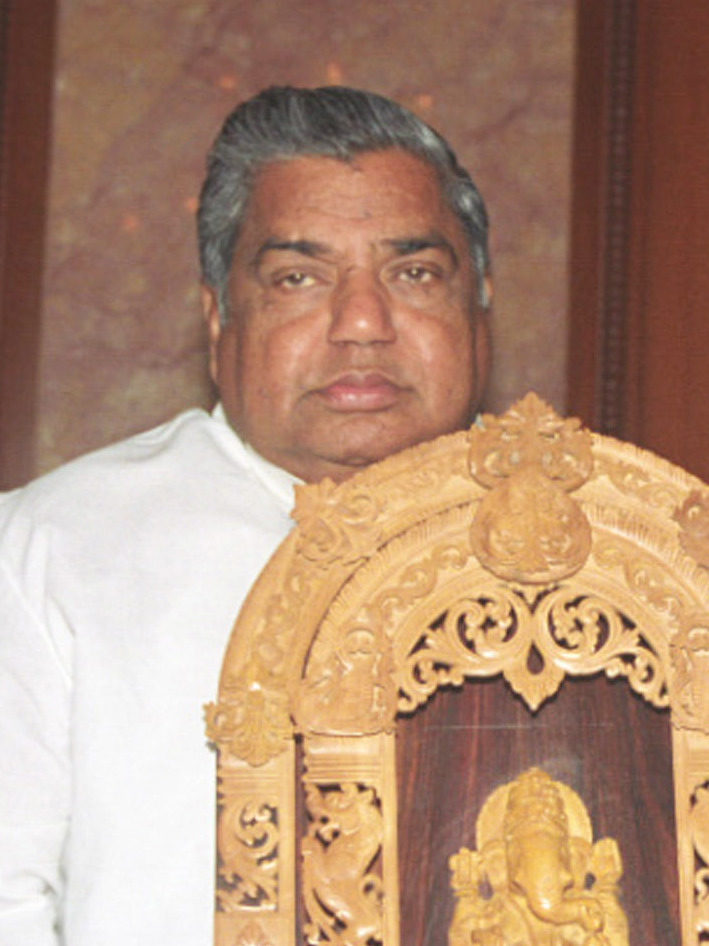
- Dharam Singh; Hon'ble Chief Minister of Karnataka
- Date formed: 28 May 2004
- Date dissolved: 28 January 2006

People and organisations
- Head of state: T. N. Chaturvedi (21 August 2002 – 20 August 2007)
- Head of government: Dharam Singh
- Deputy head of government: Siddaramaiah; M. P. Prakash
- No. of ministers: 32
- Member parties: INC; JD(S)
- Status in legislature: Coalition
- Opposition party: BJP
- Opposition leader: B. S. Yediyurappa(assembly)

History
- Election: 2004
- Outgoing election: 2008 (After First Yediyurappa ministry)
- Legislature term: 1 year 8 months
- Predecessor: Krishna ministry
- Successor: First Kumaraswamy ministry

Dharam Singh ministry was the Council of Ministers in Karnataka, a state in South India headed by Dharam Singh that was formed after the 2004 Karnataka elections.

In the government headed by Dharam Singh, the Chief Minister was from INC while Deputy Chief Minister was from JD(S). Apart from the CM & Deputy CM, there were other ministers in the government.

== Tenure of the government ==
After the 2004 assembly elections, BJP emerged as the single largest party with 79 seats, followed by the INC with 65 seats and JD(S) with 58 seats. JD(S) extended the support to INC to form the government. Governor T. N. Chaturvedi invited the alliance to form the government. Known for his adaptability and friendly nature, Dharam Singh of the Congress was the unanimous choice of both parties to head the government.

He was sworn in as Chief Minister on 28 May 2004 with the support of JD(S). JD(S) MLA Siddaramaiah was sworn in as the Deputy Chief Minister, along with Chief Minister Dharam Singh.

On 5 June 2004, First cabinet expansion occurred in which 5 Ministers from INC and 5 Ministers from JDS took oath.

On 15 December 2004, Second cabinet expansion occurred in which 9 Ministers from INC and 11 Ministers from JDS took oath.

On 18 January 2006, Forty-two MLAs of Janata Dal (Secular) under Kumaraswamy's leadership left the coalition and the government collapsed. Chief Minister Dharam Singh was asked to prove majority on 25 January 2006. He resigned since he did not have enough numbers. On 28 January 2006, Karnataka Governor T. N. Chaturvedi invited Kumaraswamy to form the government in the state after the resignation of the Congress Government led by Dharam Singh.

== Council of Ministers ==
Sr. No.	Name	MLA/MLC	Constituency	Designation	Portfolio(s)	Party	Term of Office	
Sr. No.	Name	MLA/MLC	Constituency	Designation	Portfolio(s)	Party	Took Office	Left Office
Chief Minister
1.	Dharam Singh	MLA	Jevargi	Chief Minister	Home affairs including Intelligence wing; Cabinet Affairs; DPAR; BMRDA; KUWSDB from Urban Dept; Information Technology and Bio-Technology; Kannada and Culture; Other departments not allocated to a Minister.	INC	28 May 2004	28 January 2006
Deputy Chief Minister
2.	Siddaramaiah	MLA	Chamundeshwari	Deputy Chief Minister	Finance	JD(S)	28 May 2004	5 August 2005
3.	M. P. Prakash	MLA	Hoovina Hadagali	Deputy Chief Minister	Finance; Revenue (Muzrai); Parliamentary Affairs.	JD(S)	8 August 2005	28 January 2006
Cabinet Ministers
4.	Mallikarjun Kharge	MLA	Gurmitkal	Cabinet Minister	Transport; Water Resources	INC	5 June 2004	28 January 2006
5.	Prakash Hukkeri	MLA	Sadalga	Cabinet Minister	Agricultural Marketing	INC	5 June 2004	28 January 2006
6.	K. Srinivasa Gowda	MLA	Kolar	Cabinet Minister	Agriculture	INC	5 June 2004	28 January 2006
7.	S. R. Morey	MLA	Dharwad	Cabinet Minister	Small Industries	INC	5 June 2004	28 January 2006
8.	P. G. R. Sindhia	MLA	Kanakapura	Cabinet Minister	Large & Medium Industries; SSI and Infrastructure	JD(S)	5 June 2004	28 January 2006
9.	H. D. Revanna	MLA	Holenarasipur	Cabinet Minister	Public Works Department; Energy	JD(S)	5 June 2004	28 January 2006
10.	D. Manjunath	MLA	Hiriyur	Cabinet Minister	Higher Education	JD(S)	5 June 2004	28 January 2006
11.	Merajuddin Patel	MLA	Humnabad	Cabinet Minister	Minorities Welfare; Waqf	JD(S)	5 June 2004	28 January 2006
12.	R. V. Deshpande	MLA	Haliyal	Cabinet Minister	Co-operation	INC	15 December 2004	28 January 2006
13.	H. K. Patil	MLC	West Graduates Constituency	Cabinet Minister	Law; Parliamentary Affairs	INC	15 December 2004	28 January 2006
14.	Ramalinga Reddy	MLA	Jayanagar	Cabinet Minister	Primary & Secondary Education	INC	15 December 2004	28 January 2006
15.	Gurupadappa Nagamarapalli	MLA	Aurad	Cabinet Minister	Forest; Ecology; Environment	INC	15 December 2004	28 January 2006
16.	Y. Nagappa	MLA	Harihar	Cabinet Minister	Social Welfare	INC	15 December 2004	28 January 2006
17.	Anjanamurthy	MLA	Nelamangala	Cabinet Minister	Housing	INC	15 December 2004	28 January 2006
18.	B. Shivaram	MLA	Gandasi	Cabinet Minister	Information and Publicity	INC	15 December 2004	28 January 2006
19.	Jabbar Khan Honalli	MLA	Hubli City	Cabinet Minister	Minorities Welfare	INC	15 December 2004	28 January 2006
20.	T. Bhagirathi Marulasiddanagouda	MLA	Kottur	Cabinet Minister	Women and Child Welfare	INC	15 December 2004	28 January 2006
21.	H. C. Mahadevappa	MLA	T. Narasipur	Cabinet Minister	Rural Development; Panchayati Raj	JD(S)	15 December 2004	5 August 2005
22.	H. S. Mahadeva Prasad	MLA	Gundlupet	Cabinet Minister	Food & Civil Supplies	JD(S)	15 December 2004	28 January 2006
23.	N. Chaluvaraya Swamy	MLA	Nagamangala	Cabinet Minister	Health and Family Welfare	JD(S)	15 December 2004	28 January 2006
24.	Iqbal Ansari	MLA	Gangawati	Cabinet Minister	Medical Education	JD(S)	15 December 2004	28 January 2006
25.	Amaregowda Patil Bayyapur	MLA	Lingsugur	Cabinet Minister	Sugar	JD(S)	15 December 2004	28 January 2006
26.	R. Srinivas	MLA	Mulbagal	Cabinet Minister	Urban Development; Horticulture	JD(S)	15 December 2004	28 January 2006
27.	C. Chennigappa	MLA	koratagere	Cabinet Minister	Sericulture	JD(S)	15 December 2004	28 January 2006
28.	D. T. Jayakumar	MLA	Nanjangud	Cabinet Minister	Tourism	JD(S)	15 December 2004	28 January 2006
29.	Basavaraj Horatti	MLC	Karnataka Teachers West	Cabinet Minister	Science and Technology and Small Savings	JD(S)	15 December 2004	28 January 2006
30.	Tanveer Sait	MLA	Narasimharaja	Minister of State	Labour; Haj	INC	5 June 2004	28 January 2006
31.	Satish Jarkiholi	MLC	Belgaum Local Authorities	Minister of State	Textiles	JD(S)	15 December 2004	5 August 2005
32.	B. Satyanarayana	MLA	Sira	Minister of State	Rural Water Supply	JD(S)	15 December 2004	28 January 2006

If the office of a Minister is vacant for any length of time, it automatically comes under the charge of the Chief Minister.

== See also ==
- Karnataka Legislative Assembly
