= Deve Gowda ministry (Karnataka) =

Indian state government (1994–96)

- 21st Ministry of the State of Karnataka
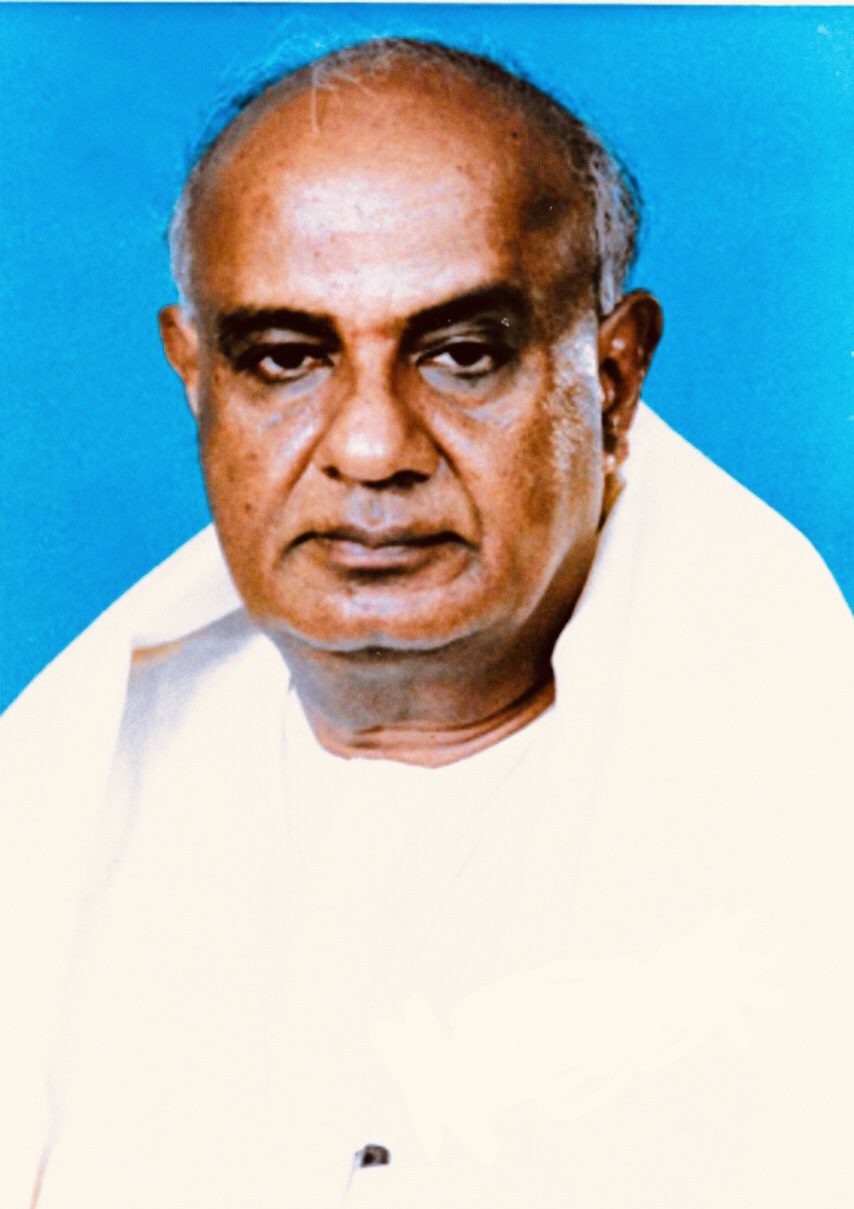
- H. D. Deve Gowda; Hon'ble Chief Minister of Karnataka
- Date formed: 11 December 1994
- Date dissolved: 31 May 1996

People and organisations
- Head of state: Khurshed Alam Khan (6 January 1992 – 2 December 1999)
- Head of government: H. D. Deve Gowda
- Deputy head of government: J. H. Patel
- Ministers removed: 46
- Member parties: Janata Dal
- Status in legislature: Majority
- Opposition party: BJP
- Opposition leader: B. S. Yediyurappa (assembly)

History
- Election: 1994
- Outgoing election: 1999 (After J. H. Patel ministry)
- Legislature term: 1 year 5 months
- Predecessor: Moily ministry
- Successor: J. H. Patel ministry

Deve Gowda ministry was the Council of Ministers in Karnataka, a state in South India headed by H. D. Deve Gowda that was formed after the 1994 Karnataka elections.

In the government headed by H. D. Deve Gowda, the chief minister was from the Indian National Congress party. Apart from the chief minister, there were deputy chief minister and other ministers in the government.

== Tenure of the government ==
In 1994, Janata Dal emerged victorious and H. D. Deve Gowda was elected as leader of the Party, hence sworn in as Chief Minister of Karnataka and J. H. Patel was picked as Deputy Chief Minister. The ministry was dissolved when H. D. Deve Gowda became the Prime Minister of India after Janata Dal forged United Front alliance with INC and 11 other parties

== Council of Ministers ==
=== Chief Minister and deputy Chief Minister ===
SI No.	Name	Constituency	Portfolio	Term of Office		Party
1.	H. D. Deve Gowda; Chief Minister	Ramanagara	Other departments not allocated to a Minister.	11 December 1994	31 May 1996	Janata Dal
2.	J. H. Patel; Deputy chief Minister	Channagiri	Power; Tourism	11 December 1994	31 May 1996	Janata Dal

=== Cabinet Ministers ===
SI No.	Name	Constituency	Portfolio	Term of Office		Party
1.	Siddaramaiah	Chamundeshwari	Finance	1994	1996	Janata Dal
2.	D. Manjunath	Hiriyur	Revenue	11 December 1994	31 May 1996	Janata Dal
3.	Vaijnath Patil	Chincholi	Urban development	11 December 1994	31 May 1996	Janata Dal
4.	R. L. Jalappa	Doddaballapur	Co operation	1995	1996	Janata Dal
5.	Basavaraj Rayareddy	Yelburga	Housing	1994	1996	Janata Dal
6.	Merajuddin Patel	Humnabad	Municipal Affairs	1994	1996	Janata Dal
7.	D. B. Chandregowda	MLC	Law & Parliamentary Affairs	1994	1996	Janata Dal
8.	Muniyappa Muddappa	Kalmala	Irrigation	1994	1996	Janata Dal
9.	C. Byre Gowda	Vemagal		1994	1996	Janata Dal
10.	M. C. Nanaiah	MLC	Rural Development & Panchayati Raj; Forests	1994	1996	Janata Dal
11.	M. P. Prakash	Hadagali		1994	1996	Janata Dal
12.	H. C. Mahadevappa	T. Narasipur	Health & Family Welfare	1994	1996	Janata Dal
13	H. G. Govinde Gowda	Sringeri	Primary & Secondary Education	1994	1996	Janata Dal
14.	R. V. Deshpande	Haliyal	Industries	1994	1996	Janata Dal

=== Minister of State ===
S.No	Portfolio	Minister	Constituency	Term of Office		Party
1.	Tourism, Home, Wakf, Bangalore development and Small scale industries	R. Roshan Baig	Shivajinagar	11 December 1994	31 May 1996	Janata Dal

If the office of a Minister is vacant for any length of time, it automatically comes under the charge of the Chief Minister.

== See also ==
- Karnataka Legislative Assembly
