= Yediyurappa ministry =

Yediyurappa ministry may refer to:

- First Yediyurappa ministry, the government of Karnataka headed by B. S. Yediyurappa in 2007
- Second Yediyurappa ministry, the government of Karnataka headed by B. S. Yediyurappa from 2008 to 2011
- Third Yediyurappa ministry, the government of Karnataka headed by B. S. Yediyurappa from 2019 to 2021

== See also ==
- B. S. Yediyurappa
