= D. Sudhakar =

Indian politician (1961–2026)

Cabinet Minister, Government of Karnataka
- In office 27 May 2023 – 10 May 2026
- Governor: Thawarchand Gehlot
- Cabinet: Second Siddaramaiah ministry
- Chief Minister: Siddaramaiah
- Ministry and Departments: Planning & Statistics
- In office 23 September 2010 – 31 July 2011
- Governor: Rameshwar Thakur (till 24 June 2009); Hans Raj Bhardwaj (from 24 June 2009)
- Cabinet: Second Yediyurappa ministry
- Chief Minister: B.S. Yeddyurappa
- Ministry and Departments: Youth Affairs
- Preceded by: Goolihatti D Shekhar
- In office 30 May 2008 – 9 September 2009
- Governor: Rameshwar Thakur (till 24 June 2009); Hans Raj Bhardwaj (from 24 June 2009)
- Cabinet: Second Yediyurappa ministry
- Chief Minister: B.S. Yeddyurappa
- Ministry and Departments: Social Welfare
- Succeeded by: A. Narayanaswamy

Member of Karnataka Legislative Assembly
- In office May 2023 – 10 May 2026
- Preceded by: Poornima Krishnappa
- Constituency: Hiriyur
- In office 2008–2018
- Preceded by: D. Manjunath
- Succeeded by: Poornima Krishnappa
- Constituency: Hiriyur
- In office 2004–2008
- Preceded by: G. Basavaraj Mandimutt
- Succeeded by: Thippeswamy
- Constituency: Challakere

Personal details
- Born: 28 March 1961 Challakere, Mysore State, India
- Died: 10 May 2026 (aged 65) Bangaluru, Karnataka, India
- Party: Indian National Congress
- Other political affiliations: Bharatiya Janata Party
- Occupation: Politician

Dasharathaiah Sudhakar (28 March 1961 – 10 May 2026) was an Indian politician from Karnataka. He served as Cabinet Minister in Government of Karnataka and was a member of the Karnataka Legislative Assembly representing Hiriyur.

== Life and career ==
Sudhakar was elected from Challakere in 2004 and from Hiriyur in 2008 and 2013. He served as Social Welfare Minister during B. S. Yediyurappa's tenure as Chief Minister.

He was appointed chairman for Karnataka State Electronics Development Corporation Limited (KEONICS) in 2016.

Sudhakar died of complications from a lung infection on 10 May 2026, at the age of 66.
