= First Kumaraswamy ministry =

Government of Karnataka, India (2006–07)

- 25th Ministry of the State of Karnataka
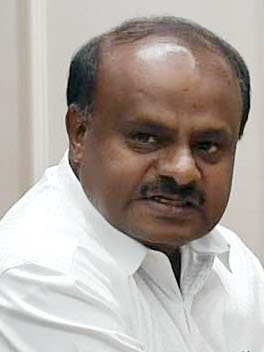
- H. D. Kumaraswamy; Hon'ble Chief Minister of Karnataka
- Date formed: 3 February 2006
- Date dissolved: 9 October 2007

People and organisations
- Head of state: T. N. Chaturvedi (21 August 2002 – 20 August 2007); Rameshwar Thakur (21 August 2007 – 24 June 2009)
- Head of government: H. D. Kumaraswamy
- Deputy head of government: B. S. Yediyurappa
- Member parties: BJP; JD(S)
- Status in legislature: Coalition
- Opposition party: INC
- Opposition leader: Dharam Singh

History
- Election: 2004
- Outgoing election: 2008 (After First Yediyurappa ministry)
- Legislature term: 1 year 8 months
- Predecessor: Dharam Singh ministry
- Successor: First Yediyurappa ministry

H. D. Kumaraswamy ministry was the Council of Ministers in Karnataka, a state in South India headed by H. D. Kumaraswamy that was formed after the Dharam Singh ministry fell short of majority.

In the government headed by H. D. Kumaraswamy, the Chief Minister was from JD(S) while Deputy Chief Minister was from BJP. Apart from the CM & Deputy CM, there were other ministers in the government.

== Tenure of the Government ==
After the 2004 assembly elections, BJP emerged as the single largest party with 79 seats, followed by the INC with 65 seats and JD(S) with 58 seats. JD(S) extended the support to INC to form the government. Governor T. N. Chaturvedi invited the alliance to form the government. Known for his adaptability and friendly nature, Dharam Singh of the Congress was the unanimous choice of both parties to head the government. He was sworn in as Chief Minister on 28 May 2004 with the support of JD(S). JD(S) MLA Siddaramaiah was sworn in as the Deputy Chief Minister, along with Chief Minister Dharam Singh. On 18 January 2006, Forty-two MLAs of Janata Dal (Secular) under Kumaraswamy's leadership left the coalition and the government collapsed. Chief Minister Dharam Singh was asked to prove majority on 25 January 2006. He resigned since he did not have enough numbers. On 28 January 2006, Karnataka Governor T. N. Chaturvedi invited Kumaraswamy to form the government in the state after the resignation of the Congress Government led by Dharam Singh.

H. D. Kumaraswamy was sworn in as the Chief Minister of Karnataka on 3 February 2006, along with B. S. Yediyurappa of the BJP who took oath as Deputy Chief Minister of Karnataka. The first expansion of the cabinet took place on 18 February 2006 where 20 Ministers were inducted — 11 from the BJP and 9 from the JD(S). The cabinet was further expanded on 21 June 2006 with the induction of 8 ministers, 4 each from both the parties. The cabinet was reshuffled on 25 January 2007 wherein three ministers from JD(S) and two from the BJP were sworn in.

On 27 September 2007, Kumaraswamy said that he would leave office on 3 October as part of a power-sharing agreement between the Janata Dal (Secular) and the Bharatiya Janata Party (BJP), despite the calls of some legislators in the JD(S) for him to remain in office for the time being, due to complications in arranging the transfer of power. However, on 4 October 2007, he refused to transfer power to the BJP. Finally, on 8 October 2007, he tendered his resignation to Governor Rameshwar Thakur, and the state was put under President's rule two days later.

== Council of Ministers ==
Portfolio	Minister	Took office	Left office	Party
Chief Minister; Home Department; Department Personnel and Administrative Reforms; Cabinet Affairs; Intelligence; Urban Development; Other departments not allocated to any Minister	H. D. Kumaraswamy	3 February 2006	8 October 2007	JD(S)
Deputy Chief Minister; Minister of Finance; Minister of Excise	B. S. Yediyurappa	3 February 2006	8 October 2007	BJP
Minister of Primary & Secondary Education	Basavaraj Horatti	18 February 2006	8 October 2007	JD(S)
Minister of Major & Medium Irrigation from Water Resources	K. S. Eshwarappa	18 February 2006	8 October 2007	BJP
Minister of Forest; Minister of Ecology & Environment	C. Chennigappa	18 February 2006	8 October 2007	JD(S)
Minister of Revenue	Jagadish Shettar	18 February 2006	8 October 2007	BJP
Minister of Housing	D. T. Jayakumar	18 February 2006	8 October 2007	JD(S)
Minister of Higher Education	D. H. Shankaramurthy	18 February 2006	8 October 2007	BJP
Minister of Transport	N. Chaluvaraya Swamy	18 February 2006	8 October 2007	JD(S)
Minister of Planning & Statistics; Minister of Lottery & Small Savings; Minister of Science & Technology	Ramachandra Gowda	18 February 2006	8 October 2007	BJP
Minister of Labour; Minister of Minority Welfare	Iqbal Ansari	18 February 2006	8 October 2007	JD(S)
Minister of Medical Education	V. S. Acharya	18 February 2006	8 October 2007	BJP
Minister of Agricultural Marketing	Sharanabassappa Darshanapur	18 February 2006	8 October 2007	JD(S)
Minister of Rural Development & Panchayat Raj	C. M. Udasi	18 February 2006	8 October 2007	BJP
Minister of Youth Services & Sports	Alkod Hanumanthappa	18 February 2006	8 October 2007	JD(S)
Minister of Food, Civil Supplies & Consumer Affairs	Govind Karjol	18 February 2006	8 October 2007	BJP
Minister of Agriculture	Bandeppa Kashempur	18 February 2006	8 October 2007	Independent
Minister of Health & Family Welfare	R. Ashoka	18 February 2006	8 October 2007	BJP
Minister of Social Welfare	Balachandra Jarkiholi	18 February 2006	8 October 2007	JD(S)
Minister of Tourism	B. Sriramulu	18 February 2006	8 October 2007	BJP
Minister of Ports & Inland Transport; Minister of Muzrai	B. Nagaraja Shetty	18 February 2006	8 October 2007	BJP
Minister of Law & Parliamentary Affairs	Basavaraj Horatti	18 February 2006	21 June 2006	JD(S)
Minister of Law & Parliamentary Affairs	M. P. Prakash	21 June 2006	8 October 2007	JD(S)
Minister of Home Affairs	M. P. Prakash	21 June 2006	8 October 2007	JD(S)
Minister of Public Works Department; Minister of Energy	H. D. Revanna	21 June 2006	8 October 2007	JD(S)
Minister of Women & Child Development	H. K. Kumaraswamy	21 June 2006	8 October 2007	JD(S)
Minister of Haj & Wakf	Iqbal Ansari	18 February 2006	21 June 2006	JD(S)
Minister of Haj & Wakf	B. Z. Zameer Ahmed Khan	29 June 2006	8 October 2007	JD(S)
Minister of Small Scale Industries	Katta Subramanya Naidu	18 February 2006	21 June 2006	BJP
Minister of Small Scale Industries	Shivanand Naik	21 June 2006	8 October 2007	BJP
Minister of Rural Water Supply & Sanitation; Minister of Sugarcane Development & Directorate	S. A. Ravindranath	21 June 2006	8 October 2007	BJP
Minister of Animal Husbandry	V. S. Acharya	18 February 2006	21 June 2006	BJP
Minister of Animal Husbandry	Revu Naik Belamgi	21 June 2006	8 October 2007	BJP
Minister of Horticulture	B. Nagaraja Shetty	18 February 2006	21 June 2006	BJP
Minister of Horticulture	Shashikanth Akkappa Naik	21 June 2006	8 October 2007	BJP
Minister of Large & Medium Industries	B. S. Yediyurappa	18 February 2006	21 June 2006	BJP
Minister of Large & Medium Industries	Katta Subramanya Naidu	21 June 2006	8 October 2007	BJP
Minister of Kannada & Culture	H. S. Mahadeva Prasad	29 January 2007	8 October 2007	JD(S)
Minister of Municipal Administration	Alangur Srinivas	29 January 2007	8 October 2007	JD(S)
Minister of Co-operation	GT Devegowda	29 January 2007	8 October 2007	JD(S)
Minister of Sericulture	Katta Subramanya Naidu	18 February 2006	21 June 2006	BJP
Minister of Sericulture	Ramachandra Gowda	21 June 2006	25 January 2007	BJP
Minister of Sericulture	S. Shivanna	25 January 2007	8 October 2007	BJP
Minister of Textiles	B. Sriramulu	18 February 2006	29 January 2007	BJP
Minister of Textiles	Appu Pattanshetty	29 January 2007	8 October 2007	BJP

If the office of a Minister is vacant for any length of time, it automatically comes under the charge of the Chief Minister.

== See also ==
- Karnataka Legislative Assembly
