= Second Yediyurappa ministry =

State government of Karnataka, India (2008–2011)

- 27th Ministry of Karnataka
- 2008 - 2011
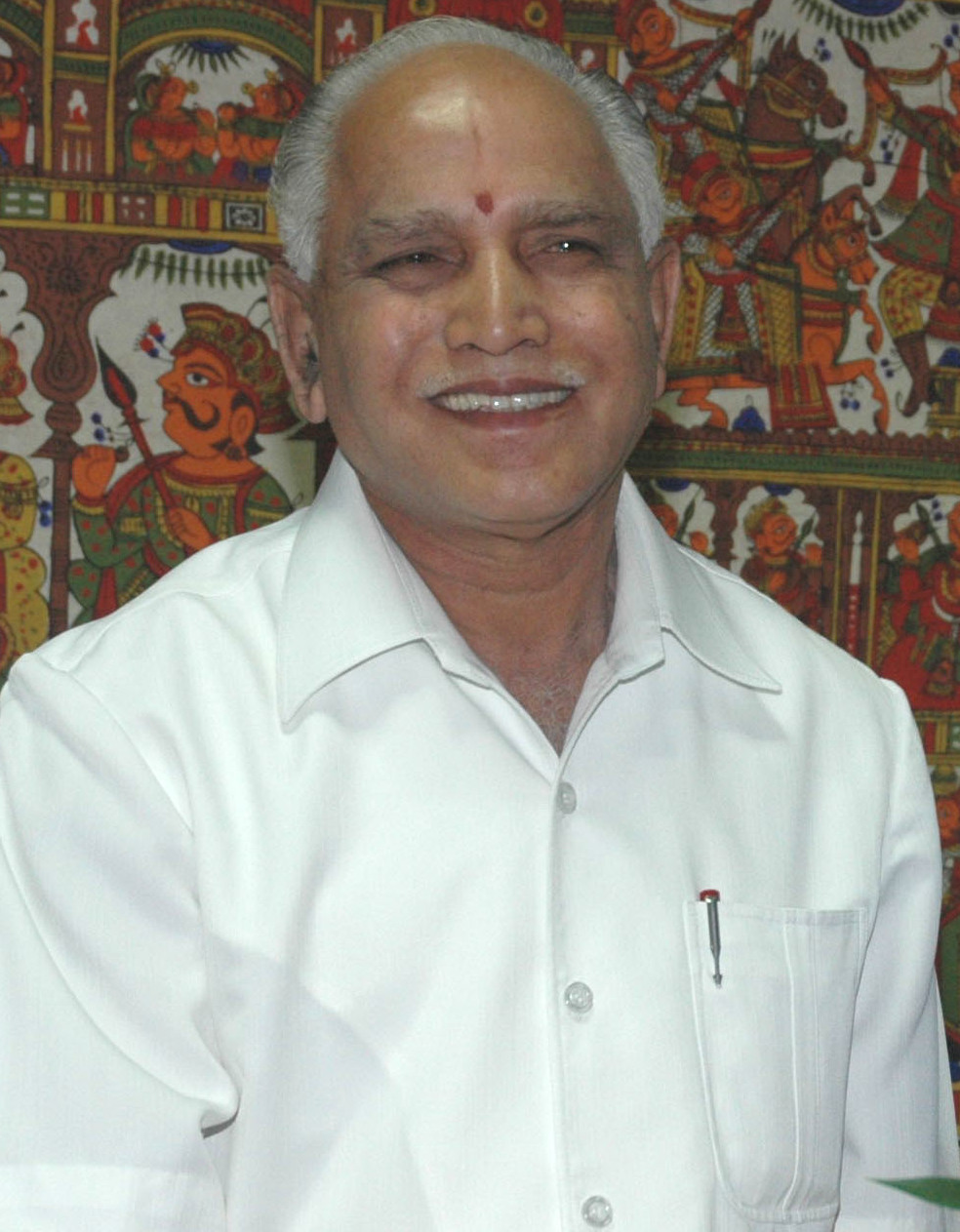
- B. S. Yeddyurappa; Hon'ble Chief Minister of Karnataka
- Date formed: 30 May 2008
- Date dissolved: 31 July 2011

People and organisations
- Head of state: Hon'ble Governor of Karnataka: Rameshwar Thakur (21 August 2007 – 24 June 2009); Hans Raj Bhardwaj (24 June 2009 – 29 June 2014)
- Head of government: B. S. Yeddyurappa
- No. of ministers: 32
- Total no. of members: 33
- Member parties: Bharatiya Janata Party
- Status in legislature: Majority
- Opposition party: Indian National Congress; Janata Dal (Secular)
- Opposition leader: Mallikarjun Kharge; Siddaramaiah (assembly)

History
- Election: 2008
- Outgoing election: 2013 (After Shettar ministry)
- Legislature term: 5 years
- Predecessor: First Yediyurappa ministry
- Successor: D. V. Sadananda Gowda ministry

This is a list of ministers from B. S. Yeddyurappa cabinets starting from 30 May 2008 to 31 July 2011. B. S. Yeddyurappa is the leader of Bharatiya Janata Party and was sworn in as the Chief Minister of Karnataka on 30 May 2008. Here is the list of the ministers of his ministry.

== Council of Ministers ==
Portfolio	Minister	Took office	Left office	Party
Chief Minister; Finance; Department Personnel and Administrative Reforms; Cabinet Affairs; Intelligence; Mines & Geology; Other departments not allocated to any Minister	B. S. Yediyurappa	30 May 2008	31 July 2011	BJP
Minister of Home Affairs	V. S. Acharya	30 May 2008	23 September 2010	BJP
Minister of Home Affairs	R. Ashoka	23 September 2010	31 July 2011	BJP
Minister of Transport	R. Ashoka	30 May 2008	31 July 2011	BJP
Minister of Law & Justice; Minister of Parliamentary Affairs and Legislation; Minister of Urban Development	S. Suresh Kumar	30 May 2008	31 July 2011	BJP
Minister of Energy	K. S. Eshwarappa	30 May 2008	28 January 2010	BJP
Minister of Energy	Shobha Karandlaje	23 September 2010	31 July 2011	BJP
Minister of Public Works Department	C. M. Udasi	30 May 2008	31 July 2011	BJP
Minister of Higher Education	Arvind Limbavali	30 May 2008	23 September 2010	BJP
Minister of Higher Education	V. S. Acharya	23 September 2010	31 July 2011	BJP
Minister of Medical Education	Ramachandra Gowda	30 May 2008	12 September 2010	BJP
Minister of Medical Education	S. A. Ramadas	23 September 2010	31 July 2011	BJP
Minister of Primary & Secondary Education	Vishweshwar Hegde Kageri	30 May 2008	31 July 2011	BJP
Minister of IT & BT	Katta Subramanya Naidu	30 May 2008	3 December 2010	BJP
Minister of Excise	Katta Subramanya Naidu	30 May 2008	23 September 2010	BJP
Minister of Excise	M. P. Renukacharya	23 September 2010	31 July 2011	BJP
Minister of Science & Technology	Katta Subramanya Naidu	30 May 2008	23 September 2010	BJP
Minister of Science & Technology	Anand Asnotikar	23 September 2010	31 July 2011	BJP
Minister of Tourism; Minister of Infrastructure Development	G. Janardhana Reddy	30 May 2008	31 July 2011	BJP
Minister of Revenue	G. Karunakara Reddy	30 May 2008	31 July 2011	BJP
Minister of Horticulture	S. K. Belubbi	30 May 2008	23 September 2010	BJP
Minister of Horticulture	S. A. Ravindranath	23 September 2010	31 July 2011	BJP
Minister of Health & Family Welfare	B. Sriramulu	30 May 2008	31 July 2011	BJP
Minister of Major & Medium Irrigation	Basavaraj Bommai	30 May 2008	31 July 2011	BJP
Minister of Minor Irrigation	Govind Karjol	30 May 2008	31 July 2011	BJP
Minister of Large & Medium Industries	Murugesh Nirani	30 May 2008	31 July 2011	BJP
Minister of Cooperation	Laxman Savadi	30 May 2008	31 July 2011	BJP
Minister of Food, Civil Supplies & Consumer Affairs	Hartalu Halappa	30 May 2008	2 May 2010	BJP
Minister of Food, Civil Supplies & Consumer Affairs	R. Ashoka	2 May 2010	23 September 2010	BJP
Minister of Food, Civil Supplies & Consumer Affairs	V. Somanna	23 September 2010	31 July 2011	BJP
Minister of Housing	SN Krishnaiah Shetty	30 May 2008	17 June 2009	BJP
Minister of Housing	Katta Subramanya Naidu	23 September 2010	3 December 2010	BJP
Minister of Muzrai	SN Krishnaiah Shetty	30 May 2008	17 June 2009	BJP
Minister of Muzrai	J. Krishna Palemar	23 September 2010	31 July 2011	BJP
Minister of Ports & Inland Transport	J. Krishna Palemar	30 May 2008	31 July 2011	BJP
Minister of Fisheries	J. Krishna Palemar	30 May 2008	23 September 2010	BJP
Minister of Fisheries	Anand Asnotikar	23 September 2010	31 July 2011	BJP
Minister of Animal Husbandry	Revu Naik Belamgi	30 May 2008	23 September 2010	BJP
Minister of Animal Husbandry	P. M. Narendra Swamy	23 September 2010	31 July 2011	Independent
Minister of Rural Development & Panchayat Raj	Shobha Karandlaje	30 May 2008	9 November 2009	BJP
Minister of Rural Development & Panchayat Raj	Jagadish Shettar	23 September 2010	31 July 2011	BJP
Minister of Labour	B. N. Bache Gowda	30 May 2008	31 July 2011	BJP
Minister of Agriculture	S. A. Ravindranath	30 May 2008	23 September 2010	BJP
Minister of Agriculture	Umesh Katti	23 September 2010	31 July 2011	BJP
Minister of Haj, Wakf & Minority Welfare	Mumtaz Ali Khan	30 May 2008	31 July 2011	BJP
Minister of Planning & Statistics	Govind Karjol	30 May 2008	23 September 2010	BJP
Minister of Planning & Statistics	V. S. Acharya	23 September 2010	31 July 2011	BJP
Minister of Social Welfare	D. Sudhakar	30 May 2008	9 September 2009	Independent
Minister of Social Welfare	A. Narayanaswamy	23 September 2010	31 July 2011	BJP
Minister of Agriculture Marketing	Shivaraj Tangadagi	30 May 2008	31 July 2011	Independent
Minister of Textiles	Goolihatti D Shekhar	30 May 2008	23 September 2010	Independent
Minister of Textiles	Venkataramanappa	23 September 2010	31 July 2011	Independent
Minister of Youth Affairs	Goolihatti D Shekhar	30 May 2008	23 September 2010	Independent
Minister of Youth Affairs	D. Sudhakar	23 September 2010	31 July 2011	Independent
Minister of Women & Child Development	P. M. Narendra Swamy	30 May 2008	23 September 2010	Independent
Minister of Women & Child Development	C. C. Patil	23 September 2010	31 July 2011	BJP
Minister of Sericulture	Venkataramanappa	30 May 2008	31 July 2011	Independent
Minister of Small Scale Industries	Venkataramanappa	30 May 2008	23 September 2010	Independent
Minister of Small Scale Industries	Shivaraj Tangadagi	23 September 2010	31 July 2011	Independent
Minister of Sugar Industries	Shivaraj Tangadagi	30 May 2008	23 September 2010	Independent
Minister of Sugar Industries	S. A. Ravindranath	23 September 2010	31 July 2011	BJP
Minister of Environment & Ecology	J. Krishna Palemar	23 September 2010	31 July 2011	BJP
Minister of Forest	C. H. Vijayashankar	23 September 2010	31 July 2011	BJP
Minister of Municipal Administration	S. Suresh Kumar	30 May 2008	23 September 2010	BJP
Minister of Municipal Administration	Balachandra Jarkiholi	23 September 2010	31 July 2011	BJP
Minister of Public Enterprises Department	Balachandra Jarkiholi	23 September 2010	31 July 2011	BJP
Minister of Small Savings & Lotteries	J. Krishna Palemar	30 May 2008	23 September 2010	BJP
Minister of Small Savings & Lotteries	Revu Naik Belamgi	23 September 2010	31 July 2011	BJP

== See also ==
- Government of Karnataka
- Karnataka Legislative Assembly
