= J. H. Patel ministry =

Government of Karnataka, India (1996–99)

- 22nd Ministry of the State of Karnataka
- Date formed: 31 May 1996
- Date dissolved: 7 October 1999

People and organisations
- Head of state: Khurshed Alam Khan (6 January 1992 – 2 December 1999)
- Head of government: J. H. Patel
- No. of ministers: 45
- Member parties: Janata Dal
- Status in legislature: Majority

History
- Election: 1994
- Outgoing election: 1999
- Legislature term: 5 years
- Predecessor: H. D. Deve Gowda cabinet
- Successor: S. M. Krishna cabinet

The J. H. Patel cabinet was the Council of Ministers in the Indian state of Karnataka headed by Chief minister J. H. Patel that was formed after the 1994 Karnataka Legislative Assembly elections.

== Council of ministers ==
| Sno. | Name | Office | Portfolio | Took Office | Left Office |
|---|---|---|---|---|---|
| 1 | J. H. Patel | Chief Minister | | 31 May 1996 | 7 October 1999 |
| 2 | Siddaramaiah | Deputy Chief Minister | Finance; Planning | 31 May 1996 | 22 July 1999 Dismissed |
| 3 | D. Manjunath | Cabinet Minister | Revenue | 31 May 1996 | 7 October 1999 |
| 4 | B. A. Mohideen | Cabinet Minister | Small Scale Industries; Higher Education | 31 May 1996 | 7 October 1999 |
| 5 | P. G. R. Sindhia | Cabinet Minister | Transport; Home | 31 May 1996 | 7 October 1999 |
| 6 | M. C. Naniah | Cabinet Minister | Law | 31 May 1996 | 7 October 1999 |
| 7 | C Byre Gowda | Cabinet Minister | Agriculture | 31 May 1996 | 7 October 1999 |
| 8 | G Basavannappa | Cabinet Minister | Food and Civil Supplies | 31 May 1996 | 7 October 1999 |
| 9 | H. D. Revanna | Cabinet Minister | Housing | 31 May 1996 | 22 July 1999 Dismissed |
| 10 | Umesh Katti | Cabinet Minister | Sugar | 31 May 1996 | 7 October 1999 |
| 11 | Vimalabai Deshmukh | Cabinet Minister | Women and Child Welfare | 2 February 1998 | 7 October 1999 |
| 12 | K. N. Nage Gowda | Cabinet Minister | Major Irrigation | 31 May 1996 | 7 October 1999 |
| 13 | M. P. Prakash | Cabinet Minister | Panchayati Raj | 31 May 1996 | 7 October 1999 |
| 14 | H. G. Govinde Gowda | Cabinet Minister | Primary and Secondary Education | 31 May 1996 | 7 October 1999 |
| 15 | B. L. Shankar | Cabinet Minister | Industries | February 1999 | 7 October 1999 |
| 16 | B. Somashekar | Cabinet Minister | Revenue | 1999 | 7 October 1999 |
| 17 | Muniyappa Muddappa | Cabinet Minister | Hindu endowments (Muzrai) | 31 May 1996 | 7 October 1999 |
| 18 | Shankar Naik | Cabinet Minister | | 31 May 1996 | 7 October 1999 |
| 19 | B.B. Ningaiah | Cabinet Minister | | 2 February 1998 | 7 October 1999 |
| 20 | S. R. Lakshmaiah | Cabinet Minister | | 31 May 1996 | 7 October 1999 |
| 21 | K. M. Krishnamurthy | Cabinet Minister | | 31 May 1996 | 7 October 1999 |
| 22 | H. Shivappa | Cabinet Minister | | 31 May 1996 | 7 October 1999 |
| 23 | K. Venkatesh | Cabinet Minister | | 31 May 1996 | 7 October 1999 |
| 24 | M. P. Prakash | Minister of State | | 31 May 1996 | 7 October 1999 |
| 25 | Leeladevi R. Prasad | Minister of State | | 31 May 1996 | 7 October 1999 |
| 26 | D.Nagarajaiah | Minister of State | Sericulture | 31 May 1996 | 7 October 1999 |
| 27 | K. N. Nage Gowda | Minister of State | | 31 May 1996 | 7 October 1999 |
| 28 | B. N. Bacche Gowda | Minister of State | | 31 May 1996 | 7 October 1999 |
| 29 | V. Somanna | Minister of State | Bengaluru development; Prisons | 31 May 1996 | 7 October 1999 |
| 30 | A. B. Patil | Minister of State | | 31 May 1996 | 7 October 1999 |
| 31 | H. Nagappa | Minister of State | Agricultural Marketing | 31 May 1996 | 7 October 1999 |
| 32 | Anant Nag | Minister of State | Bangalore development | 31 May 1996 | 7 October 1999 |
| 33 | R. Roshan Baig | Minister of State | Tourism; Home; Wakf; Bangalore development; Small scale industries | 31 May 1996 | 7 October 1999 |
| 34 | R. V. Deshpande | Cabinet Minister | Heavy industries | 31 May 1996 | 2 February 1998 |
| 35 | K. B. Shanappa | Cabinet Minister | Excise | 31 May 1996 | 2 February 1998 |
| 36 | B. Somashekar | Cabinet Minister | Higher Education | 31 May 1996 | 2 February 1998 |
| 37 | B. Somashekar | Cabinet Minister | Forests | April 1998 | 7 October 1999 |
| 38 | S. D. Jayaram | Cabinet Minister | Geology | 31 May 1996 | 2 February 1998 Died |
| 39 | Ajaykumar Sarnaik | Minister of State | Sports and Youth Affairs | 31 May 1996 | February 1998 (elected to 11th Lok Sabha) |
| 40 | Ramesh Jigajinagi | Cabinet Minister | Revenue | 31 May 1996 | February 1998 (elected to 11th Lok Sabha) |
| 41 | Merajuddin Patel | Cabinet Minister | Municipal Administration | 31 May 1996 | 7 July 1997 |
| 42 | B. T. Lalitha Naik | Cabinet Minister | Women and Child Welfare | 31 May 1996 | 2 February 1998 |
| 43 | Thippeswamy | Cabinet Minister | Minor Irrigation | | |
| 44 | H. C. Mahadevappa | Cabinet Minister | Health & Family Welfare | | |
| 45 | S. S. Patil | Cabinet Minister | Co-operation | | |
| 46 | K. M. Krishna Reddy | Cabinet Minister | Social Welfare | | |
| 47 | M. S. Patil | Cabinet Minister | Textiles | | |
| 48 | Gurupadappa Nagamarapalli | Cabinet Minister | Forests | | |
| 49 | C. M. Udasi | Cabinet Minister | Public Works | | |
| 50 | M. V. Guttedar | Cabinet Minister | Backward Classes & Minorities | | |
| 51 | D. T. Jayakumar | Minister of State | Horticulture | | |
| 52 | K. Jayaprakash Hegde | Minister of State | Ports & Fisheries | | |
| 53 | Sharanabasappa Darshanapur | Minister of State | Power | | |
| 54 | B. Sathyanarayana | Minister of State | Labour | | |
| 55 | R. Krishnappa | Minister of State | Adult Education and Public Library | | |
| 56 | M. Varade Gowda | Minister of State | Sericulture | | |
| 57 | B. N. Shivannavar | Minister of State | Environment | | |

== See also ==
- Politics of Karnataka
