= B. Shivanna =

Indian politician (born 1967)

Shivanna
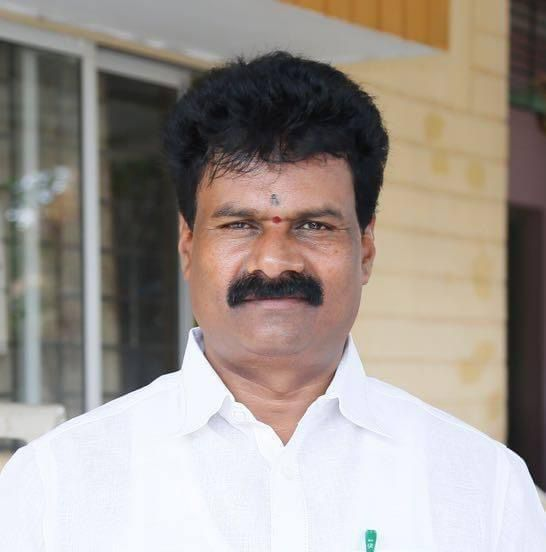

Personal details
- Born: February 1, 1967 Bengaluru, Karnataka, India
- Party: Indian National Congress
- Spouse: M Saraswathi
- Children: 2
- Education: M Sc. LLB
- Alma mater: Government Science College Bangalore University (1992) Islamia Law College (1995)
- Profession: Politician

Bolappa Shivanna (born 1967) is an Indian politician from Karnataka. He is a three time member of Karnataka Legislative Assembly election from Anekal Assembly constituency from 2013 representing the Indian National Congress.

He was appointed chairman for Bengaluru Metropolitan Transport Corporation (BMTC) on 26 January 2024. Recently, in September 2026, he was appointed the Chairman of Karnataka State Pollution Control Board (KSPCB).

== Early life and education ==
Shivanna was born in Hulimavu, Bangalore Urban District, in a farmer's family. He completed schooling at Begur High School and later did the pre university course at Government Central Junior College, Bangalore during 1983-85. He completed B.Sc. in 1987 at Government Arts and Science college.

== Career ==
Shivanna won from Anekal Assembly constituency representing Indian National Congress in the 2023 Karnataka Legislative Assembly election. He polled 134,797 votes and defeated his nearest rival, Srinivas C. Hullahalli of Bharatiya Janata Party, by a huge margin of 31,325 votes. He became an MLA for the first time in 2013, winning the Anekal Assembly constituency representing Congress. He went on to retain the seat in 2018 and won for the third time in 2023. He started his electoral journey winning as a member of the Zilla Panchayath Member from Begur Constituency in 1995. Later, he lost the Assembly election in 2004 from Anekal and in 2008 from Mahadevapura. He was active in students political activities and joined NSUI. In 1989, he took part in the State Level Convention and also mobilised students from all over Karnataka.

=== Controversy ===
Just before the elections on 18 April 2018, an I-T Raid was conducted at his residence.
