= Challakere Assembly constituency =

Legislative Assembly constituency in Karnataka State, India

Coordinates: 14.32°N 76.65°E

Challakere
- Constituency No. 98 for the Karnataka Legislative Assembly

Constituency details
- Country: India
- Region: South India
- State: Karnataka
- District: Chitradurga
- Lok Sabha constituency: Chitradurga
- Established: 1956
- Total electors: 220,968
- Reservation: ST

Member of Legislative Assembly
- 16th Karnataka Legislative Assembly
- Incumbent T. Raghumurthy
- Party: Indian National Congress
- Elected year: 2023
- Preceded by: Thippeswamy

Challakere Assembly constituency is one of the 224 Legislative Assembly constituencies of Karnataka in India.

It is part of Chitradurga district and is reserved for candidates belonging to the Scheduled Tribes.

== Members of the Legislative Assembly ==
Election	Member	Party
1957	A. Bheemappa Naik	Indian National Congress
1957	T. Hanumaiah	Indian National Congress
1962	B. L. Gowda	Praja Socialist Party
1967	B. L. Gowda	Indian National Congress
1972	V. Masiyappa	Indian National Congress
1978	N. Jayanna	Indian National Congress
1983	H. C. Shivashankarappa	Janata Party
1985	Thippeswamy	Janata Party
1989	N. Jayanna	Indian National Congress
1994	Thippeswamy	Janata Dal
1999	G. Basavaraja Mandimutt	Bharatiya Janata Party
2004	D. Sudhakar	Indian National Congress
2008	Thippeswamy	Bharatiya Janata Party
2013	T. Raghumurthy	Indian National Congress
2018	T. Raghumurthy	Indian National Congress
2023	T. Raghumurthy	Indian National Congress

== Election results ==
=== Assembly Election 2023 ===
2023 Karnataka Legislative Assembly election : Challakere
Party	Candidate	Votes	%	±%
INC	T. Raghumurthy	67,952	38.16	▼4.96
JD(S)	Ravish Kumar. M	51,502	28.92	▼6.19
Independent	K. T. Kumar Swamy	29,148	16.37	New
BJP	Anil Kumar. R	22,894	12.86	▼6.95
AAP	Marakka	3,072	1.73	New
NOTA	None of the above	1,639	0.92	▼0.10
Margin of victory		16,450	9.24	▲1.23
Turnout		178,308	80.69	▼0.34
Total valid votes		178,061		
Registered electors		220,968		▲5.76
INC hold		Swing	▼4.96	

=== Assembly Election 2018 ===
2018 Karnataka Legislative Assembly election : Challakere
Party	Candidate	Votes	%	±%
INC	T. Raghumurthy	72,874	43.12	▲6.27
JD(S)	Raveesh Kumar	59,335	35.11	▲18.35
BJP	K. T. Kumar Swamy	33,471	19.81	▲11.86
NOTA	None of the above	1,730	1.02	New
Swaraj India	K. P. Bhuthaiah	1,590	0.94	New
Margin of victory		13,539	8.01	▼6.14
Turnout		169,310	81.03	▲2.64
Total valid votes		169,000		
Registered electors		208,942		▲10.69
INC hold		Swing	▲6.27	

=== Assembly Election 2013 ===
2013 Karnataka Legislative Assembly election : Challakere
Party	Candidate	Votes	%	±%
INC	T. Raghumurthy	60,197	36.85	▲1.08
KJP	K. T. Kumar Swamy	37,074	22.69	New
JD(S)	P. Thippeswamyp. T	27,373	16.76	▼3.34
BJP	G. P. Jayapalaiah	12,981	7.95	▼28.06
BSRCP	L. Nagarajunaganna	4,233	2.59	New
Independent	B. Hanumantharaya	2,568	1.57	New
BSP	P. Palaiah	998	0.61	▼2.72
Margin of victory		23,123	14.15	▲13.91
Turnout		147,968	78.39	▲12.70
Total valid votes		163,365		
Registered electors		188,758		▲4.65
INC gain from BJP		Swing	▲0.84	

=== Assembly Election 2008 ===
2008 Karnataka Legislative Assembly election : Challakere
Party	Candidate	Votes	%	±%
BJP	Thippeswamy	42,591	36.01	▲19.03
INC	Shashi Kumar	42,302	35.77	▼4.19
JD(S)	P. Thippeswamy	23,777	20.10	▲3.54
BSP	Dr. Obanna. K. Poojar	3,938	3.33	▲2.42
Independent	Sanna Suraiah	2,672	2.26	New
JD(U)	G. Bhagirathi Nayaka	1,804	1.53	New
Independent	B. Obanna	1,191	1.01	New
Margin of victory		289	0.24	▼22.75
Turnout		118,476	65.69	▼2.92
Total valid votes		118,275		
Registered electors		180,369		▲3.89
BJP gain from INC		Swing	▼3.95	

=== Assembly Election 2004 ===
2004 Karnataka Legislative Assembly election : Challakere
Party	Candidate	Votes	%	±%
INC	D. Sudhakar	47,550	39.96	▲27.17
BJP	G. Basavaraja Mandimutt	20,199	16.98	▼8.87
JD(S)	Thippeswamy	19,707	16.56	▼0.66
Independent	Lakshmikanta. N. R	14,074	11.83	New
Independent	K. Rangaswamy	10,195	8.57	New
JP	H. Jagaluraiah	3,263	2.74	New
Kannada Nadu Party	Giriyappa R. (R. G. Master)	1,703	1.43	New
BSP	Panduranga. G. R	1,077	0.91	New
Margin of victory		27,351	22.99	▲14.36
Turnout		119,122	68.61	▼6.77
Total valid votes		118,991		
Registered electors		173,623		▲17.59
INC gain from BJP		Swing	▲14.11	

=== Assembly Election 1999 ===
1999 Karnataka Legislative Assembly election : Challakere
Party	Candidate	Votes	%	±%
BJP	G. Basavaraja Mandimutt	26,517	25.85	▲5.44
JD(S)	Thippeswamy	17,665	17.22	New
Independent	N. Jayanna	16,922	16.49	New
INC	T. Prabhudev	13,121	12.79	▼14.52
Independent	B. L. Gowda	8,116	7.91	New
Independent	H. Jagaluraiah	4,200	4.09	New
JD(U)	H. C. Shivashankarappa	3,848	3.75	New
Independent	Basaiah	3,658	3.57	New
Independent	M. Shivamurthy	1,969	1.92	New
Margin of victory		8,852	8.63	▼5.74
Turnout		111,295	75.38	▲5.96
Total valid votes		102,594		
Rejected ballots		8,662	7.78	▲5.71
Registered electors		147,647		▲5.74
BJP gain from JD		Swing	▼15.83	

=== Assembly Election 1994 ===
1994 Karnataka Legislative Assembly election : Challakere
Party	Candidate	Votes	%	±%
JD	Thippeswamy	39,560	41.68	▲21.25
INC	N. Jayanna	25,919	27.31	▼13.44
BJP	G. Basavaraja Mandimutt	19,375	20.41	New
INC	T. Thammanna	9,161	9.65	New
KRRS	Patel Rajasekharappa	619	0.65	New
Margin of victory		13,641	14.37	▼1.85
Turnout		96,932	69.42	▲4.90
Total valid votes		94,913		
Rejected ballots		2,011	2.07	▼3.66
Registered electors		139,637		▲7.23
JD gain from INC		Swing	▲0.93	

=== Assembly Election 1989 ===
1989 Karnataka Legislative Assembly election : Challakere
Party	Candidate	Votes	%	±%
INC	N. Jayanna	32,274	40.75	▲4.04
JP	Thippeswamy	19,426	24.53	New
JD	P. Thimma Reddy	16,178	20.43	New
Kranti Sabha	K. Rangaswamy	10,056	12.70	New
Independent	B. Hanumanthaiah	831	1.05	New
Margin of victory		12,848	16.22	▼5.94
Turnout		84,017	64.52	▲0.49
Total valid votes		79,203		
Rejected ballots		4,814	5.73	▲4.14
Registered electors		130,221		▲33.57
INC gain from JP		Swing	▼18.12	

=== Assembly Election 1985 ===
1985 Karnataka Legislative Assembly election : Challakere
Party	Candidate	Votes	%	±%
JP	Thippeswamy	36,163	58.87	▼6.33
INC	B. L. Gowda	22,551	36.71	▲7.40
BJP	C. P. Thippeswamy	1,106	1.80	New
Independent	Srinivasa Reddy	704	1.15	New
Independent	D. Hanumanthappa	613	1.00	New
Margin of victory		13,612	22.16	▼13.73
Turnout		62,421	64.03	▼3.82
Total valid votes		61,426		
Rejected ballots		995	1.59	▼0.26
Registered electors		97,490		▲10.97
JP hold		Swing	▼6.33	

=== Assembly Election 1983 ===
1983 Karnataka Legislative Assembly election : Challakere
Party	Candidate	Votes	%	±%
JP	H. C. Shivashankarappa	38,146	65.20	▲30.47
INC	B. K. Seetharamaiah	17,149	29.31	▲27.21
Independent	G. Shivanna	1,605	2.74	New
Independent	Neelakanta	1,049	1.79	New
Margin of victory		20,997	35.89	▲7.45
Turnout		59,605	67.85	▼8.31
Total valid votes		58,504		
Rejected ballots		1,101	1.85	▼0.21
Registered electors		87,854		▲7.78
JP gain from INC(I)		Swing	▲2.03	

=== Assembly Election 1978 ===
1978 Karnataka Legislative Assembly election : Challakere
Party	Candidate	Votes	%	±%
INC(I)	N. Jayanna	38,411	63.17	New
JP	B. L. Gowda	21,120	34.73	New
INC	B. Obalappa	1,276	2.10	▼53.86
Margin of victory		17,291	28.44	▲12.24
Turnout		62,085	76.16	▲16.99
Total valid votes		60,807		
Rejected ballots		1,278	2.06	▲2.06
Registered electors		81,514		▲11.46
INC(I) gain from INC		Swing	▲7.21	

=== Assembly Election 1972 ===
1972 Mysore State Legislative Assembly election : Challakere
Party	Candidate	Votes	%	±%
INC	V. Masiyappa	23,643	55.96	▲5.12
INC(O)	H. C. Shivashankarappa	16,798	39.76	New
Independent	D. Hanumanthappa	1,810	4.28	New
Margin of victory		6,845	16.20	▲7.99
Turnout		43,273	59.17	▼17.11
Total valid votes		42,251		
Registered electors		73,132		▲20.58
INC hold		Swing	▲5.12	

=== Assembly Election 1967 ===
1967 Mysore State Legislative Assembly election : Challakere
Party	Candidate	Votes	%	±%
INC	B. L. Gowda	22,194	50.84	▲15.27
PSP	G. V. Anjanappa	18,609	42.63	▼0.51
Independent	K. S. Eswaraiah	2,498	5.72	New
Independent	D. Borappa	352	0.81	New
Margin of victory		3,585	8.21	▲0.65
Turnout		46,265	76.28	▲11.12
Total valid votes		43,653		
Registered electors		60,649		▼7.37
INC gain from PSP		Swing	▲7.70	

=== Assembly Election 1962 ===
1962 Mysore State Legislative Assembly election : Challakere
Party	Candidate	Votes	%	±%
PSP	B. L. Gowda	17,067	43.14	New
INC	Ratnagiri Venkatarangan	14,075	35.57	▼17.84
ABJS	T. Marappa	6,507	16.45	New
CPI	P. Thimma Reddy	1,917	4.85	New
Margin of victory		2,992	7.56	▲3.92
Turnout		42,663	65.16	▲7.95
Total valid votes		39,566		
Registered electors		65,477		▼42.14
PSP gain from INC		Swing	▲15.43	

=== Assembly Election 1957 ===
1957 Mysore State Legislative Assembly election : Challakere
Party	Candidate	Votes	%	±%
INC	A. Bheemappa Naik	35,883	27.71	New
INC	T. Hanumaiah	33,283	25.70	New
Independent	Mulka Govinda Reddy	31,170	24.07	New
Independent	Vaddara Yangatappa	29,152	22.51	New
Margin of victory		4,713	3.64	
Turnout		129,488	57.21	
Total valid votes		129,488		
Registered electors		113,172		
INC win (new seat)				

== See also ==
- List of constituencies of the Karnataka Legislative Assembly
- Chitradurga district
