= Shahapur, Karnataka Assembly constituency =

Vidhana Sabha constituency in Karnataka

Coordinates: 16.70°N 76.84°E

Shahapura
- Constituency No. 37 for the Karnataka Legislative Assembly

Constituency details
- Country: India
- Region: South India
- State: Karnataka
- District: Yadgir
- Lok Sabha constituency: Raichur
- Established: 1951
- Total electors: 238,979
- Reservation: None

Member of Legislative Assembly
- 16th Karnataka Legislative Assembly
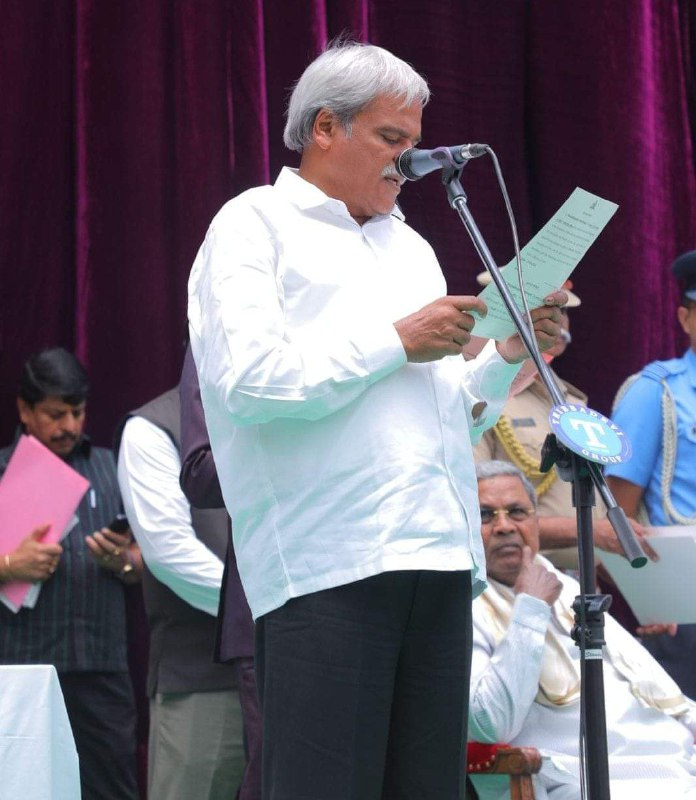
- Incumbent Sharanabassappa Darshanapur
- Party: Indian National Congress
- Elected year: 2023
- Preceded by: Guru Patil Shiraval

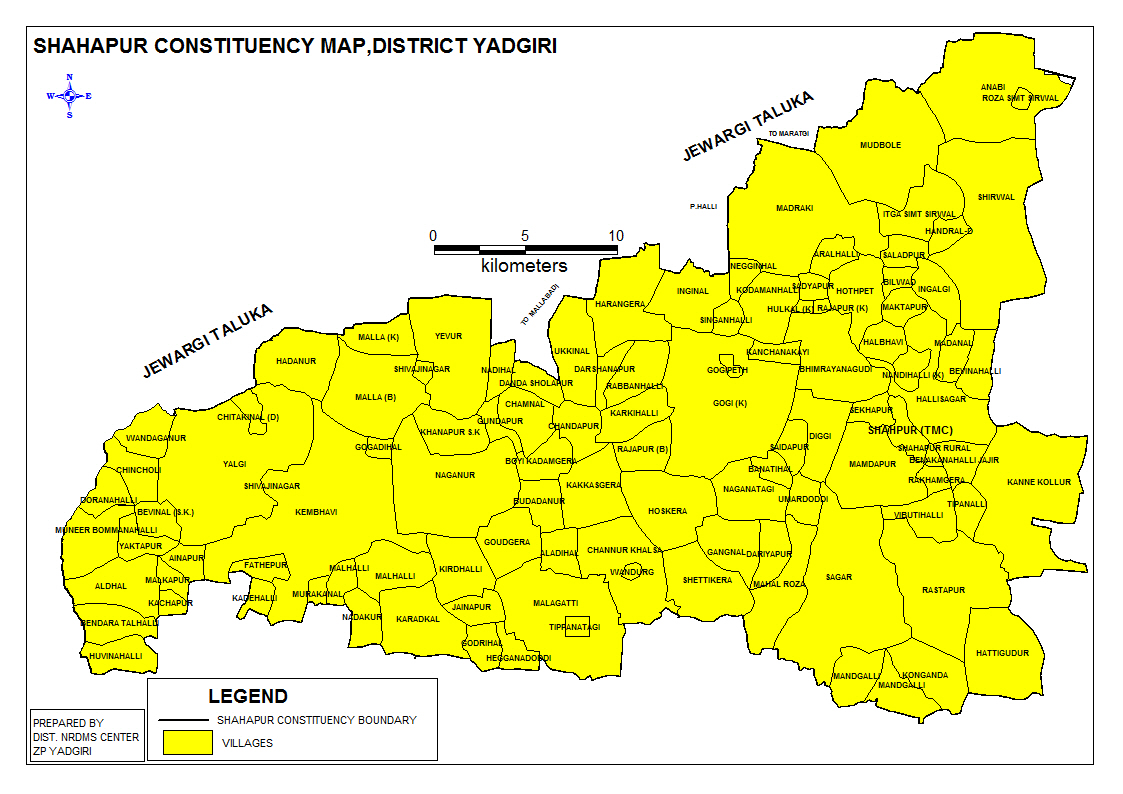

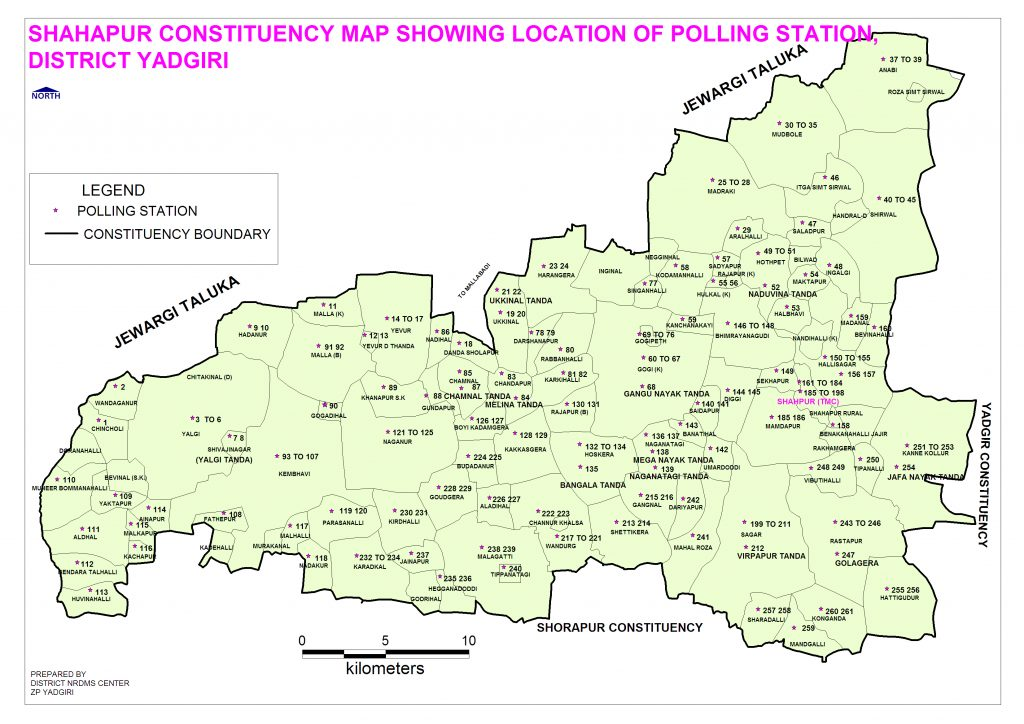

Shahapur Assembly constituency is one of the seats in Karnataka Legislative Assembly in India. It is a segment of Raichur Lok Sabha constituency.

== Members of the Legislative Assembly ==
Election	Member	Party
1952	Virupakshappa	Indian National Congress
1957	Virupakshappa	Indian National Congress
1962	Mahantswami Verupakshaya	Swatantra Party
1967	R. V. N. R. K. Naik	Swatantra Party
1967 By-election (Note: Resigned on 13 March 1967)	Bapu Gowda Rayappa	Indian National Congress
1972	Bapu Gowda Rayappa	Indian National Congress
1978	Shivanna Sawoor	Indian National Congress
1983	Bapu Gowda Rayappa	Janata Party
1985	Shivashekharappagouda Sirwal	Indian National Congress
1989	Shivashekharappagouda Sirwal	Indian National Congress
1994	Sharanabasappa Darshanapur	Janata Dal
1999	Shivashekharappagouda Sirwal	Indian National Congress
2004	Sharanabasappa Darshanapur	Janata Dal
2008	Sharanabasappa Darshanapur	Indian National Congress
2013	Guru Patil Shirwal	Karnataka Janata Paksha
2018	Sharanabasappa Darshanapur	Indian National Congress
2023	Sharanabasappa Darshanapur	Indian National Congress

== Election results ==
=== Assembly Election 2023 ===
2023 Karnataka Legislative Assembly election : Shahapur
Party	Candidate	Votes	%	±%
INC	Sharanabasappa Darshanapur	78,353	47.00	▼3.27
BJP	Ameenraddi Yalagi	52,326	31.39	▲0.92
JD(S)	Guru Patil Shirwal	30,396	18.23	▲3.32
AAP	Chandrashekhar Sabayya	1,320	0.79	New
NOTA	None of the above	1,252	0.75	▼0.16
Margin of victory		26,027	15.61	▼4.19
Turnout		166,776	69.79	▲0.45
Total valid votes		166,714		
Registered electors		238,979		▲5.84
INC hold		Swing	▼3.27	

=== Assembly Election 2018 ===
2018 Karnataka Legislative Assembly election : Shahapur
Party	Candidate	Votes	%	±%
INC	Sharanabasappa Darshanapur	78,642	50.27	▲9.25
BJP	Guru Patil Shirwal	47,668	30.47	▲29.23
JD(S)	Ameenraddi Yalagi	23,329	14.91	▲4.76
AIMEP	Azam Ali	1,767	1.13	New
NOTA	None of the above	1,422	0.91	New
Independent	Manohar	1,197	0.77	New
Independent	Basawaraj	1,017	0.65	New
Margin of victory		30,974	19.80	▲14.96
Turnout		156,577	69.34	▲1.74
Total valid votes		156,430		
Registered electors		225,803		▲20.06
INC gain from KJP		Swing	▲4.42	

=== Assembly Election 2013 ===
2013 Karnataka Legislative Assembly election : Shahapur
Party	Candidate	Votes	%	±%
KJP	Guru Patil Shirwal	54,924	45.85	New
INC	Sharanabasappa Darshanapur	49,128	41.02	▼5.69
JD(S)	Sharanappa Saladapur	12,159	10.15	▼25.57
Independent	Amaranna	2,225	1.86	New
Independent	Bhimappa	2,128	1.78	New
BSRCP	Shankaranna. G. Vanikyal	1,796	1.50	New
BJP	Veerannagouda	1,484	1.24	▼10.07
BSP	Mohammed Anvar Pasha	1,138	0.95	New
Independent	Appasaheb Gouda	1,070	0.89	New
Margin of victory		5,796	4.84	▼6.15
Turnout		127,143	67.60	▲9.33
Total valid votes		119,778		
Registered electors		188,076		▲8.07
KJP gain from INC		Swing	▼0.86	

=== Assembly Election 2008 ===
2008 Karnataka Legislative Assembly election : Shahapur
Party	Candidate	Votes	%	±%
INC	Sharanabasappa Darshanapur	47,343	46.71	▲13.96
JD(S)	Shivashekharappagouda Sirwal	36,207	35.72	▼15.28
BJP	Dr. Mallannagouda Patil Ukkinal	11,464	11.31	▲0.03
Independent	Shivappa	3,135	3.09	New
Independent	Bheemaraya	1,969	1.94	New
Independent	Mahanthgouda Maddaraki	1,239	1.22	New
Margin of victory		11,136	10.99	▼7.27
Turnout		101,415	58.27	▼2.17
Total valid votes		101,357		
Registered electors		174,033		▼9.57
INC gain from JD(S)		Swing	▼4.29	

=== Assembly Election 2004 ===
2004 Karnataka Legislative Assembly election : Shahapur
Party	Candidate	Votes	%	±%
JD(S)	Sharanabasappa Darshanapur	59,310	51.00	▲47.90
INC	Shivashekharappagouda Sirwal	38,080	32.75	▼18.15
BJP	Dr. Mallannagouda Patil Ukkinal	13,120	11.28	New
Kannada Nadu Party	Venkateshwar S. Rathod	2,546	2.19	New
Independent	Hanamanth	1,980	1.70	New
Independent	Bheemaraya	1,255	1.08	New
Margin of victory		21,230	18.26	▲10.17
Turnout		116,314	60.44	▼0.72
Total valid votes		116,291		
Registered electors		192,447		▲19.87
JD(S) gain from INC		Swing	▲0.10	

=== Assembly Election 1999 ===
1999 Karnataka Legislative Assembly election : Shahapur
Party	Candidate	Votes	%	±%
INC	Shivashekharappagouda Sirwal	47,963	50.90	▲20.14
JD(U)	Sharanabasappa Darshanapur	40,339	42.80	New
JD(S)	Raja Venkatappa Nayak	2,921	3.10	New
Independent	Shivaraj Jagappa Alabnur	1,595	1.69	New
SP	Basavaraj Sharanappa Desai Kembhavi	1,421	1.51	New
Margin of victory		7,624	8.09	▼7.57
Turnout		98,191	61.16	▼1.38
Total valid votes		94,239		
Rejected ballots		3,952	4.02	▲0.52
Registered electors		160,544		▲9.73
INC gain from JD		Swing	▲4.48	

=== Assembly Election 1994 ===
1994 Karnataka Legislative Assembly election : Shahapur
Party	Candidate	Votes	%	±%
JD	Sharanabasappa Darshanapur	40,984	46.42	▲27.87
INC	Shivashekareppa Gouda	27,158	30.76	▼17.65
KRRS	Sharnappa Mallappa Saladpur	9,297	10.53	New
BJP	Mahadevappa Gouda Ekchinti	4,213	4.77	New
BSP	Ahmed Hussain Anwari Gogi	3,093	3.50	New
Independent	Basawaraj	1,335	1.51	New
CPI	Somashekhaar Bassappa	1,006	1.14	New
INC	Dharmareddy. B. Patil	962	1.09	New
Margin of victory		13,826	15.66	▼10.69
Turnout		91,496	62.54	▲5.26
Total valid votes		88,293		
Rejected ballots		3,203	3.50	▼3.20
Registered electors		146,305		▲7.94
JD gain from INC		Swing	▼1.99	

=== Assembly Election 1989 ===
1989 Karnataka Legislative Assembly election : Shahapur
Party	Candidate	Votes	%	±%
INC	Shivashekharappagouda Sirwal	35,067	48.41	▼3.19
JP	Ningangouda Desai Hadnoor	15,982	22.06	New
JD	Ayyanna Kanne Kollur	13,440	18.55	New
Kranti Sabha	Sharnappa Mallappa Saladpur	6,588	9.09	New
Independent	Balappa Dhundappa Irawwagol	1,359	1.88	New
Margin of victory		19,085	26.35	▲17.50
Turnout		77,634	57.28	▼6.62
Total valid votes		72,436		
Rejected ballots		5,198	6.70	▲3.69
Registered electors		135,537		▲29.21
INC hold		Swing	▼3.19	

=== Assembly Election 1985 ===
1985 Karnataka Legislative Assembly election : Shahapur
Party	Candidate	Votes	%	±%
INC	Shivashekharappagouda Sirwal	33,540	51.60	▲8.46
JP	Bapugouda Darshanapur	27,785	42.74	▼14.12
Independent	S. Ramesh	2,857	4.39	New
BJP	D. G. Hadapad	824	1.27	New
Margin of victory		5,755	8.85	▼4.88
Turnout		67,025	63.90	▲3.11
Total valid votes		65,006		
Rejected ballots		2,019	3.01	▼1.26
Registered electors		104,893		▲11.66
INC gain from JP		Swing	▼5.26	

=== Assembly Election 1983 ===
1983 Karnataka Legislative Assembly election : Shahapur
Party	Candidate	Votes	%	±%
JP	Bapugouda	31,089	56.86	▲23.74
INC	Shivanna Sawoor	23,583	43.14	▲39.01
Margin of victory		7,506	13.73	▼13.09
Turnout		57,110	60.79	▲0.75
Total valid votes		54,672		
Rejected ballots		2,438	4.27	▼1.22
Registered electors		93,940		▲9.68
JP gain from INC(I)		Swing	▼3.08	

=== Assembly Election 1978 ===
1978 Karnataka Legislative Assembly election : Shahapur
Party	Candidate	Votes	%	±%
INC(I)	Shivanna Sawoor	29,132	59.94	New
JP	Inayatur Rahman Ataur Rahman Siddigi	16,098	33.12	New
INC	Huligyyagouda Son Of Ramayya Gouda	2,009	4.13	▼42.08
Independent	Bhimappa Siddappa	1,362	2.80	New
Margin of victory		13,034	26.82	▲19.25
Turnout		51,422	60.04	▲7.44
Total valid votes		48,601		
Rejected ballots		2,821	5.49	▲5.49
Registered electors		85,651		▲18.80
INC(I) gain from INC(O)		Swing	▲6.15	

=== Assembly Election 1972 ===
1972 Mysore State Legislative Assembly election : Shahapur
Party	Candidate	Votes	%	±%
INC(O)	Bapu Gowda Rayappa	19,575	53.79	New
INC	H. G. Ramayyagouda	16,819	46.21	▼14.39
Margin of victory		2,756	7.57	▼13.63
Turnout		37,924	52.60	
Total valid votes		36,394		
Registered electors		72,097		
INC(O) gain from INC		Swing	▼6.81	

=== Assembly By-election 1967 ===
1967 Mysore State Legislative Assembly by-election : Shahapur
Party	Candidate	Votes	%	±%
INC	Bapu Gowda Rayappa	23,184	60.60	▲11.31
SWA	A. G. V. Pati	15,073	39.40	▼11.31
Margin of victory		8,111	21.20	▲19.78
Total valid votes		38,257		
INC gain from SWA		Swing	▲9.89	

=== Assembly Election 1967 ===
1967 Mysore State Legislative Assembly election : Shahapur
Party	Candidate	Votes	%	±%
SWA	R. V. N. R. K. Naik	17,864	50.71	▼8.84
INC	B. Rayappagouda	17,364	49.29	▲8.84
Margin of victory		500	1.42	▼17.68
Turnout		37,669	58.79	▲21.00
Total valid votes		35,228		
Registered electors		64,077		▲13.33
SWA hold		Swing	▼8.84	

=== Assembly Election 1962 ===
1962 Mysore State Legislative Assembly election : Shahapur
Party	Candidate	Votes	%	±%
SWA	Mahantswami Verupakshaya	11,915	59.55	New
INC	Virupakshappa	8,094	40.45	New
Margin of victory		3,821	19.10	
Turnout		21,369	37.79	
Total valid votes		20,009		
Registered electors		56,540		
SWA gain from INC				

=== Assembly Election 1957 ===
1957 Mysore State Legislative Assembly election : Shahapur
Party	Candidate	Votes	%	±%
INC	Virupakshappa	Unopposed		
Registered electors		53,710		▲11.21
INC hold		Swing		

=== Assembly Election 1952 ===
1952 Hyderabad State Legislative Assembly election : Shahpur
Party	Candidate	Votes	%	±%
INC	Virupakshappa	10,976	88.49	New
Socialist Party (India)	Bhimsen Rao	1,428	11.51	New
Margin of victory		9,548	76.98	
Turnout		12,404	25.68	
Total valid votes		12,404		
Registered electors		48,295		
INC win (new seat)				

== See also ==
- List of constituencies of Karnataka Legislative Assembly
