= First Yediyurappa ministry =

Government of Karnataka, India in 2007

- 26th Ministry of Karnataka
- 2007
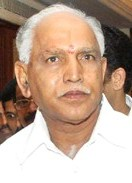
- B. S. Yeddyurappa; Hon'ble Chief Minister of Karnataka
- Date formed: 12 November 2007
- Date dissolved: 19 November 2007

People and organisations
- Head of state: Rameshwar Thakur (21 August 2007 – 24 June 2009)
- Head of government: B. S. Yeddyurappa
- No. of ministers: 4
- Total no. of members: 5
- Member parties: Bharatiya Janata Party
- Status in legislature: Coalition
- Opposition party: Indian National Congress; Janata Dal (Secular)

History
- Election: 2008
- Outgoing election: 2004
- Legislature term: 5 years
- Predecessor: First Kumaraswamy ministry
- Successor: Second Yediyurappa ministry

This is a list of minister from B. S. Yeddyurappa cabinets starting from 12 November 2007 to 19 November 2007. B. S. Yeddyurappa is the leader of Bharatiya Janata Party was sworn in the Chief Ministers of Karnataka in 12 November 2007. Here is the list of the ministers of his ministry.

== Cabinet Ministers ==
SI No.	Name	Constituency	Department	Party
1.	B. S. Yeddyurappa; Chief Minister	Shikaripura		BJP
2.	Dr. V. S. Acharya	MLC		BJP
3.	R. Ashoka	Uttarahalli		BJP
4.	Govind M. Karjol	Mudhol		BJP
5.	Jagadish Shettar	Hubli Rural		BJP

== See also ==
- Government of Karnataka
- Karnataka Legislative Assembly
