= Anekal Assembly constituency =

Legislative Assembly constituency in Karnataka state, India

Coordinates: 12.72°N 77.7°E

Anekal
- Constituency No. 177 for the Karnataka Legislative Assembly

Constituency details
- Country: India
- Region: South India
- State: Karnataka
- District: Bangalore Urban
- Lok Sabha constituency: Bangalore Rural
- Established: 1957
- Total electors: 402,620
- Reservation: SC

Member of Legislative Assembly
- 16th Karnataka Legislative Assembly
- Incumbent B. Shivanna
- Party: Indian National Congress
- Elected year: 2023
- Preceded by: A. Narayanaswamy

Anekal Assembly constituency is one of the 224 constituencies in the Karnataka Legislative Assembly of Karnataka, a southern state of India. It is also part of Bangalore Rural Lok Sabha constituency. It is in Bangalore Urban district and is reserved for candidates belonging to the Scheduled Castes.

== Members of the Legislative Assembly ==
Election	Member	Party
1952-1957: Seat does not exist. See Hoskote Anekal and Bangalore South
1957	J. C. Ramaswami Reddy	Indian National Congress
1962	R. K. Prasad	Indian National Congress
1967	R. Muniswamiah	Indian National Congress
1972	M. B. Ramaswamy	Indian National Congress
1978	Y. Ramakrishna	Janata Party
1983	Y. Ramakrishna	Indian National Congress
1985	M. P. Keshavamurthy	Indian National Congress
1989	M. P. Keshavamurthy	Indian National Congress
1994	Y. Ramakrishna	Bharatiya Janata Party
1999	A. Narayanaswamy	Bharatiya Janata Party
2004	A. Narayanaswamy	Bharatiya Janata Party
2008	A. Narayanaswamy	Bharatiya Janata Party
2013	B. Shivanna	Indian National Congress
2018	B. Shivanna	Indian National Congress
2023	B. Shivanna	Indian National Congress

== Election results ==
=== Assembly Election 2023 ===
2023 Karnataka Legislative Assembly election : Anekal
Party	Candidate	Votes	%	±%
INC	B. Shivanna	134,797	53.55	▲3.53
BJP	Srinivas. C. Hullahalli	103,472	41.11	New
JD(S)	K. P. Raju	6,415	2.55	New
NOTA	None of the above	2,354	0.94	▲0.01
Margin of victory		31,325	12.45	▲8.66
Turnout		251,817	62.54	▼0.83
Total valid votes		251,702		
Registered electors		402,620		▲11.98
INC hold		Swing	▲3.53	

=== Assembly Election 2018 ===
2018 Karnataka Legislative Assembly election : Anekal
Party	Candidate	Votes	%	±%
INC	B. Shivanna	113,894	50.02	▼13.36
BJP	A. Narayanaswamy	105,267	46.24	▲7.01
BSP	G. Srinivas	2,932	1.29	New
CPI(M)	D. Mahadesh	1,425	0.63	▼0.53
NOTA	None of the above	2,115	0.93	New
Margin of victory		8,627	3.79	▼20.36
Turnout		227,846	63.37	▼5.52
Total valid votes		227,677		
Registered electors		359,550		▲32.79
INC hold		Swing	▼13.36	

=== Assembly Election 2013 ===
2013 Karnataka Legislative Assembly election : Anekal
Party	Candidate	Votes	%	±%
INC	B. Shivanna	105,464	63.38	New
BJP	A. Narayanaswamy	65,282	39.23	▼5.59
JD(S)	Anekal Keshava	7,307	4.39	New
KJP	R. Krishnamurthy	2,369	1.42	New
CPI(M)	D. Mahadesh	1,923	1.16	New
BSP	Srinivasa. P	1,365	0.82	New
Margin of victory		40,182	24.15	▲17.07
Turnout		186,521	68.89	▲10.33
Total valid votes		166,395		
Registered electors		270,767		▲13.78
INC gain from BJP		Swing	▲18.56	

=== Assembly Election 2008 ===
2008 Karnataka Legislative Assembly election : Anekal
Party	Candidate	Votes	%	±%
BJP	A. Narayanaswamy	62,455	44.82	▲8.89
INC	B. Gopal	52,593	37.74	New
JD(S)	K M Muniyappa	18,477	13.26	New
BSP	Jigani Shankar	2,004	1.44	New
Independent	Gopinatha. G. M	1,318	0.95	New
Independent	Annayappa. R. M	1,079	0.77	New
JD(U)	C. Thopaiah	849	0.61	New
Margin of victory		9,862	7.08	▲5.84
Turnout		139,349	58.56	▲0.26
Total valid votes		139,340		
Registered electors		237,971		▼20.96
BJP hold		Swing	▲8.89	

=== Assembly Election 2004 ===
2004 Karnataka Legislative Assembly election : Anekal
Party	Candidate	Votes	%	±%
BJP	A. Narayanaswamy	63,023	35.93	▼9.08
INC	Shivanna. B	60,847	34.69	New
BSP	Gopal. B	24,841	14.16	New
JD(S)	Keshavamurthy Mp	24,332	13.87	New
JP	Thopaiah. C	2,353	1.34	New
Margin of victory		2,176	1.24	▲0.14
Turnout		175,524	58.30	▼9.66
Total valid votes		175,396		
Registered electors		301,071		▲39.11
BJP hold		Swing	▼9.08	

=== Assembly Election 1999 ===
1999 Karnataka Legislative Assembly election : Anekal
Party	Candidate	Votes	%	±%
BJP	A. Narayanaswamy	63,713	45.01	New
INC	M. P Keshavamurthy S/o Palappa	62,152	43.91	New
JD(S)	A. Krishnappa S/o Annaiahppa. M	6,565	4.64	New
BSP	Munishankarappa S/o Muniswamy	6,251	4.42	New
Independent	C. Thopaiah	2,873	2.03	New
Margin of victory		1,561	1.10	▲0.40
Turnout		147,073	67.96	▼6.21
Total valid votes		141,554		
Registered electors		216,419		▲26.25
BJP hold		Swing	▲14.54	

=== Assembly Election 1994 ===
1994 Karnataka Legislative Assembly election : Anekal
Party	Candidate	Votes	%	±%
BJP	Y. Ramakrishna	37,999	30.47	New
JD	M. Ganapathiraja	37,131	29.78	New
INC	M. P. Keshava Murthy	31,533	25.29	New
BSP	B. Gopal	12,700	10.18	▲6.72
INC	E. Anjinappa	3,053	2.45	New
Margin of victory		868	0.70	▼14.86
Turnout		127,151	74.17	▲4.62
Total valid votes		124,704		
Registered electors		171,423		▲10.99
BJP gain from INC		Swing	▼10.10	

=== Assembly Election 1989 ===
1989 Karnataka Legislative Assembly election : Anekal
Party	Candidate	Votes	%	±%
INC	M. P. Keshavamurthy	39,462	40.57	▼5.62
JD	M. R. Venugopal	24,331	25.01	New
BJP	Gopalappa	12,961	13.33	▲0.28
Independent	B. V. Sampath	8,347	8.58	New
JP	M. Raja	4,069	4.18	New
BSP	B. Gopal	3,370	3.46	New
Independent	A. Narayanaswamy	2,151	2.21	New
Independent	L. Krishnappa	776	0.80	New
Margin of victory		15,131	15.56	▲10.13
Turnout		107,422	69.55	▲3.64
Total valid votes		97,267		
Registered electors		154,450		▲34.01
INC hold		Swing	▼5.62	

=== Assembly Election 1985 ===
1985 Karnataka Legislative Assembly election : Anekal
Party	Candidate	Votes	%	±%
INC	M. P. Keshavamurthy	34,586	46.19	New
JP	C. Thopaiah	30,518	40.76	New
BJP	Gopalappa	9,768	13.05	New
Margin of victory		4,068	5.43	▼4.52
Turnout		75,963	65.91	▼2.70
Total valid votes		74,872		
Registered electors		115,252		▲17.61
INC hold		Swing	▼1.09	

=== Assembly Election 1983 ===
1983 Karnataka Legislative Assembly election : Anekal
Party	Candidate	Votes	%	±%
INC	Y. Ramakrishna	31,021	47.28	▼8.60
BJP	B. Allallappa	24,494	37.33	New
JP	C. Pilligaiah	7,272	11.08	New
Independent	B. Gopal	2,190	3.34	New
Margin of victory		6,527	9.95	▼8.27
Turnout		67,239	68.61	▼3.65
Total valid votes		65,606		
Registered electors		97,995		▲6.62
INC gain from JP		Swing	▼8.60	

=== Assembly Election 1978 ===
1978 Karnataka Legislative Assembly election : Anekal
Party	Candidate	Votes	%	±%
JP	Y. Ramakrishna	36,041	55.88	New
INC(I)	M. Annappa	24,289	37.66	New
INC	K. V. Kaverappa	2,708	4.20	New
Independent	Munipapaiah	838	1.30	New
Independent	M. Muniswamappa	619	0.96	New
Margin of victory		11,752	18.22	▼13.41
Turnout		66,419	72.26	▲16.04
Total valid votes		64,495		
Rejected ballots		1,924	2.90	▲2.90
Registered electors		91,914		▲32.40
JP gain from INC		Swing	▲3.03	

=== Assembly Election 1972 ===
1972 Mysore State Legislative Assembly election : Anekal
Party	Candidate	Votes	%	±%
INC	M. B. Ramaswamy	19,891	52.85	New
INC(O)	M. Muniswamaiah	7,986	21.22	New
ABJS	A. M. Gopal	7,750	20.59	New
SWA	B. Munivenkatappa	1,245	3.31	▼25.96
Independent	V. Venkatesh	764	2.03	New
Margin of victory		11,905	31.63	▲4.19
Turnout		39,029	56.22	▲17.17
Total valid votes		37,636		
Registered electors		69,424		▲12.90
INC hold		Swing	▼3.86	

=== Assembly Election 1967 ===
1967 Mysore State Legislative Assembly election : Anekal
Party	Candidate	Votes	%	±%
INC	R. Muniswamiah	12,651	56.71	New
Independent	B. Munivenkatappa	6,529	29.27	New
Independent	Kaverappa	1,856	8.32	New
Independent	Kullappa	1,273	5.71	New
Margin of victory		6,122	27.44	▲24.15
Turnout		24,015	39.05	▼33.62
Total valid votes		22,309		
Registered electors		61,494		▲14.61
INC hold		Swing	▲5.06	

=== Assembly Election 1962 ===
1962 Mysore State Legislative Assembly election : Anekal
Party	Candidate	Votes	%	±%
INC	R. K. Prasad	18,755	51.65	New
Independent	B. N. Venkataramana Reddy	17,559	48.35	New
Margin of victory		1,196	3.29	▼4.38
Turnout		38,993	72.67	▲16.39
Total valid votes		36,314		
Registered electors		53,655		▲17.04
INC hold		Swing	▲6.36	

=== Assembly Election 1957 ===
1957 Mysore State Legislative Assembly election : Anekal
Party	Candidate	Votes	%	±%
INC	J. C. Ramaswami Reddy	11,686	45.29	New
Independent	S. Sharabhanna	9,706	37.62	New
Independent	K. Appa Reddy	4,409	17.09	New
Margin of victory		1,980	7.67	
Turnout		25,801	56.28	
Total valid votes		25,801		
Registered electors		45,845		
INC gain from				

== See also ==
- Bangalore Urban district
- List of constituencies of Karnataka Legislative Assembly
