= Poornima Krishnappa =

Indian politician

Member of the Karnataka Legislative Assembly from Hiriyur
- In office 2018–2023
- Preceded by: D. Sudhakar
- Succeeded by: D. Sudhakar
- Constituency: Hiriyur

Personal details
- Born: 25 September 1976 (age 50) Bengaluru
- Party: Indian National Congress (November 2023-Present); Bharatiya Janata Party (until November 2023)
- Education: Bangalore University
- Occupation: Politician

Krishnappa Poornima Srinivas is an Indian politician from Karnataka state. She was elected as a member of Karnataka Legislative Assembly from Hiriyur Assembly constituency as member of Bharatiya Janata Party in 2018. She served as the National President of All-India Yadav Mahasabha women cell.

== Family and education ==
K. Poornima was born to Manjula and senior Congress leader A. Krishnappa. She belongs to the Golla community which is influential in Chitradurga district. She completed her pre-university course and did her MA at Bangalore University.

== Political career ==
Poornima participated in MLA election from Varthur Assembly Constituency, Karnataka in May 2008. Poornima won in BBMP elections held in 2010 from Basavanapura from Indian National Congress party. She was the ex-member for Tax & Finance Committee from 2010 to 2015 and was also the ex-member for Sports & Education committee from 2011-2012. She won in BBMP elections held in 2015 from Krishnarajapuram from Bharatiya Janata Party. She participated in MLA Elections held in 2018 from Hiriyur Assembly Constituency from BJP and won the election with a lead of over 12000 votes. She lost the elections in March 2023. She joined Congress in November 2023 at an event in Bengaluru where 750 BJP party workers also joined the Congress.
