= R. B. Timmapur =

Indian politician (born 1964)

Cabinet Minister, Government of Karnataka
- In office 27 May 2023 – 29 May 2026
- Governor: Thawarchand Gehlot
- Cabinet: Second Siddaramaiah ministry
- Chief Minister: Siddaramaiah
- Ministry and Departments: Excise
- Preceded by: K. Gopalaiah
- In office 22 December 2018 – 23 July 2019
- Governor: Vajubhai Vala
- Cabinet: Second Kumaraswamy ministry
- Chief Minister: H. D. Kumaraswamy
- Ministry and Departments: Sugar; Ports; Inland Transport
- In office 2016–2018
- Governor: Vajubhai Vala
- Cabinet: First Siddaramaiah ministry
- Chief Minister: Siddaramaiah
- Ministry and Departments: Excise
- Preceded by: Satish Jarkiholi
- Succeeded by: H. D. Kumaraswamy

Member of Karnataka Legislative Assembly
- Incumbent
- Assumed office May 2023
- Preceded by: Govind Karjol
- Constituency: Mudhol
- In office 1999–2004
- Preceded by: Govind Karjol
- Succeeded by: Govind Karjol
- Constituency: Mudhol
- In office 1989–1994
- Preceded by: Bhimappa Jamkhandi
- Succeeded by: Govind Karjol
- Constituency: Mudhol

Member of Karnataka Legislative Council
- In office 14 June 2016 – 13 June 2022
- Preceded by: R. V. Venkatesh, INC

Personal details
- Born: 1 June 1962 (age 64) Utturu, Mysore State (present–day Karnataka), India
- Party: INC

Ramappa Balappa Timmapur is an Indian politician from Karnataka. He is currently a member of Karnataka Legislative Assembly representing Mudhol. He is a former member of Karnataka Legislative Council.

== Early life ==
Timmapur was born on 16 September 1962 to Balappa Rammappa Timmapur.

== Political career ==
On 10 June 2016, he was elected to the Karnataka Legislative Council. He secured 33 votes of INC MLAs.

He served as the Cabinet Minister of Sugar, Ports and Inland transport in Government of Karnataka headed by Chief Minister H. D. Kumaraswamy.

He was the Minister of Excise in Second Siddaramaiah ministry and held the same post in the past from 2016 till 2018 in First Siddaramaiah ministry.

== See also ==
- TA/DA scam
