= Sharanabasappa Darshanapur =

Indian politician

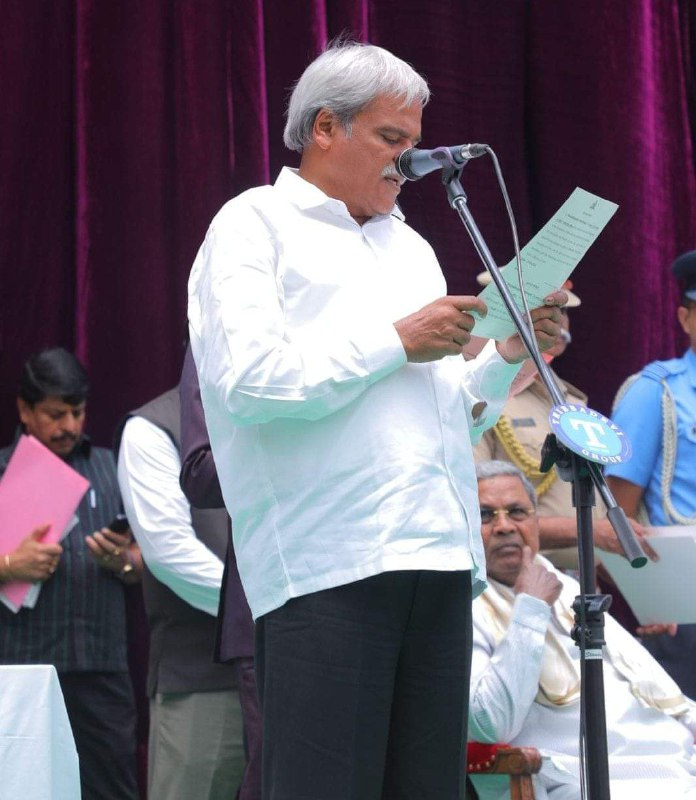

Cabinet Minister, Government of Karnataka
- In office 27 May 2023 – 29 May 2026
- Governor: Thawarchand Gehlot
- Cabinet: Second Siddaramaiah ministry
- Chief Minister: Siddaramaiah
- Ministry and Departments: Small Scale Industries; Public Enterprises
- Preceded by: M. T. B. Nagaraj
- In office 2006–2007
- Governor: T. N. Chaturvedi
- Cabinet: First Kumaraswamy ministry
- Chief Minister: H. D. Kumaraswamy
- Ministry and Departments: Agricultural Marketing
- In office 1996–1997
- Governor: Khurshed Alam Khan
- Cabinet: J. H. Patel ministry
- Chief Minister: J. H. Patel
- Ministry and Departments: Power (MOS)

Member of Karnataka Legislative Assembly
- Incumbent
- Assumed office 2018
- Preceded by: Guru Patil Shiraval
- Constituency: Shahapur
- In office 2004–2013
- Preceded by: Shivashekharappagouda Sirwal
- Succeeded by: Guru Patil Shiraval
- Constituency: Shahapur
- In office 1994–1999
- Preceded by: Shivashekharappagouda Sirwal
- Succeeded by: Shivashekharappagouda Sirwal
- Constituency: Shahapur

Personal details
- Born: 3 March 1961 (age 65)
- Party: Indian National Congress
- Spouse: Bharti Darshanapur
- Parent: Late Bapugouda Darshanapur (Father)

Sharanabasappa Gouda Darshanapur, also known as Sharanabasappa Darshanapur (born 3 March 1961) is an Indian politician, He was born in Darshanapur village in shahapur taluk, Shahapur in Yadgir District, Karnataka. He is currently serving as the Member of Karnataka Legislative Assembly from Shahapur. He is a member of the Indian National Congress. He is a Civil Engineer graduate from PDA Engineering college in Gulbarga.

== Political career ==
Sharanabasappa Darshanapur has been elected from the Shahapur constituency for 5 terms in the 1994, 2004, 2008, 2018 and 2023 Karnataka State Legislative elections. After being elected for the first time as MLA from Shahapur (Karnataka), he became the minister of state for power in 1996 under J.H. Patel Cabinet. He served as the Cabinet Minister of Agricultural Marketing and Minister In-charge for undivided Gulbarga District from 18 February 2006 to 8 October 2007 in HD Kumaraswamy's First Cabinet. Alongside, in 2006 he was made the Incharge Minister for the undivided Gulbarga District (which then comprised today's Kalaburagi and Yadgir Districts and was one of the largest Districts in Karnataka). In 2018, he was appointed Deputy Chairman of the State Planning Board. On 14 February 2022 he was appointed the member of KKRDB Board along with 11 other MLAs belonging to the Hyderabad Karnataka Region.

In 2023 Karnataka state assembly elections, Darshanapur was re-elected as an MLA from Shahapur constituency in Yadgir district. This will be his fifth term as an MLA. He was inducted into the second Siddaramaiah Cabinet as a Cabinet rank minister and given the portfolios of Small Scale Industries and Public enterprises.

== Personal life ==
Sharanabasappa Darshanapur completed his bachelor’s degree in Civil Engineering from PDA college of Engineering Kalaburagi. Before entering into politics, he worked as an Assistant engineer in Lift Irrigation Corp. Bijapur from 1985 to 1989. In 1992, he was elected as a senate member from Engineering Graduate Constituency Gulbarga University Gulbarga. In 1996, he became the founder member & President of Sir M Vishweshwaraiah sahakar Bank Niyamitha. In 1997, he became the founder and President of The Gulbarga Engineers' Family Club Gulbarga, he is currently the Chief patron of club.

He is married to Bharti Darshanapur and has one son and a daughter. His father Late Bapugouda Darshanapur was also an MLA of Shahapur for 3 terms. Late Bapu Gowda had also served as Minister for Small Scale Industries, Chief whip and Chairman of KHB.

== Positions held ==
Positions held
Year	Description	Political Party
1994	Member of Karnataka Legislative Assembly - Shahapur constituency	Janata Dal
1996	Minister of State Energy & Power - JH Patel Cabinet	Janata Dal
2004	Member of Karnataka Legislative Assembly - Shahapur constituency	Janata Dal (Secular)
2006	Cabinet Minister APMC - First Kumaraswamy Cabinet	Janata Dal (Secular)
2006	District Incharge Minister - Gulbarga (Kalaburagi-Yadgir)	Janata Dal (Secular)
2008	Member of Karnataka Legislative Assembly - Shahapur constituency	Indian National Congress
2018	Member of Karnataka Legislative Assembly - Shahapur constituency	Indian National Congress
2018	Deputy Chairman- State Planning commission, Govt. of Karnataka	Indian National Congress
2022	Member, Kalyana Karnataka Regional Development Board	
2023	Member of Karnataka Legislative Assembly - Shahapur constituency	Indian National Congress
2023	Cabinet Minister Small Scale Industries & Public enterprises - second Siddaramaiah Cabinet	Indian National Congress
