= Mudhol Assembly constituency =

Constituency of the Karnataka Legislative Assembly

Coordinates: 16.33°N 75.29°E

Mudhol
- Constituency No. 19 for the Karnataka Legislative Assembly

Constituency details
- Country: India
- Region: South India
- State: Karnataka
- District: Bagalkot
- Lok Sabha constituency: Bagalkot
- Established: 1951
- Total electors: 201,307
- Reservation: SC

Member of Legislative Assembly
- 16th Karnataka Legislative Assembly
- Incumbent R. B. Timmapur
- Party: Indian National Congress
- Elected year: 2023
- Preceded by: Govind Karjol

Mudhol Assembly constituency is one of 224 assembly constituencies in Karnataka, in India. It is part of Bagalkot Lok Sabha constituency.

== Members of the Legislative Assembly ==
Election	Member	Party
1952	Hiralal Bandulal Shah	Indian National Congress
1957	Hiralal Bandulal Shah	Indian National Congress
1962	Ningappa Kallappa Naik	Indian National Congress
1967	N. K. Pandappa	Swatantra Party
1972	N. K. Pandappa	Indian National Congress
1978	Hadimani Alias Kale Jayawant Kalasappa	Indian National Congress
1983	Kattimani Ashok Krishnaji	Indian National Congress
1985	Jamakhandi Bhimappa Gangappa	Janata Party
1989	R. B. Timmapur	Indian National Congress
1994	Govind Karjol	Janata Dal
1999	R. B. Timmapur	Indian National Congress
2004	Govind Karjol	Bharatiya Janata Party
2008	Govind Karjol	Bharatiya Janata Party
2013	Govind Karjol	Bharatiya Janata Party
2018	Govind Karjol	Bharatiya Janata Party
2023	R. B. Timmapur	Indian National Congress

== Election results ==
=== Assembly Election 2023 ===
2023 Karnataka Legislative Assembly election : Mudhol
Party	Candidate	Votes	%	±%
INC	R. B. Timmapur	77,298	48.69%	▲7.52
BJP	Govind Makthappa Karjol	59,963	37.77%	▼13.86
Independent	Bandiwaddar Satish Chinnappa	17,902	11.28%	New
NOTA	None of the above	905	0.57%	▼0.52
Margin of victory		17,335	10.92%	▲0.46
Turnout		159,752	79.36%	▲3.80
Total valid votes		158,767		
Registered electors		201,307		▲2.65
INC gain from BJP		Swing	▼2.94	

=== Assembly Election 2018 ===
2018 Karnataka Legislative Assembly election : Mudhol
Party	Candidate	Votes	%	±%
BJP	Govind Karjol	76,431	51.63%	▲1.49
INC	Bandiwaddar Satish Chinnappa	60,949	41.17%	▼4.96
JD(S)	Shankar N. Nayak	4,431	2.99%	▲1.21
KRRS	Basavant Laxman Kambale	2,088	1.41%	New
NOTA	None of the above	1,608	1.09%	New
Independent	G. F. Badanuru	1,081	0.73%	New
Margin of victory		15,482	10.46%	▲6.45
Turnout		148,183	75.56%	▼2.06
Total valid votes		148,029		
Registered electors		196,118		▲17.89
BJP hold		Swing	▲1.49	

=== Assembly Election 2013 ===
2013 Karnataka Legislative Assembly election : Mudhol
Party	Candidate	Votes	%	±%
BJP	Govind Karjol	64,727	50.14%	▲1.83
INC	R. B. Timmapur	59,549	46.13%	▲4.70
JD(S)	Nayak Shankar Narayan	2,303	1.78%	▲0.28
Independent	Kale. Suresh. Kalasappa	1,610	1.25%	New
BSRCP	Ashok Limbavali	910	0.70%	New
Margin of victory		5,178	4.01%	▼2.87
Turnout		129,129	77.62%	▲5.85
Total valid votes		129,099		
Registered electors		166,358		▲11.27
BJP hold		Swing	▲1.83	

=== Assembly Election 2008 ===
2008 Karnataka Legislative Assembly election : Mudhol
Party	Candidate	Votes	%	±%
BJP	Govind Karjol	51,835	48.31%	▼8.76
INC	R. B. Timmapur	44,457	41.43%	▲10.54
Independent	Megadi Mallappa Ramappa	6,838	6.37%	New
JD(S)	Shankar. N. Naik	1,611	1.50%	▼1.54
BSP	Ravi Maruti Kamble	1,295	1.21%	New
SP	Yallappa Bhimappa Vaddar	791	0.74%	New
Margin of victory		7,378	6.88%	▼19.30
Turnout		107,308	71.77%	▲3.61
Total valid votes		107,298		
Registered electors		149,515		▼19.02
BJP hold		Swing	▼8.76	

=== Assembly Election 2004 ===
2004 Karnataka Legislative Assembly election : Mudhol
Party	Candidate	Votes	%	±%
BJP	Govind Karjol	71,814	57.07%	New
INC	R. B. Timmapur	38,872	30.89%	▼18.04
KRRS	Harijan Ambanna Tukaram	6,284	4.99%	New
JD(S)	Jamakhandi Bhimappa Gangappa	3,826	3.04%	▲0.50
Kannada Nadu Party	Dodamani Hanamanth Durgappa	1,738	1.38%	New
Independent	Dabar Shanappa Ramappa	1,667	1.32%	New
JP	Hulakoti Tulasappa Ramaswamy	1,049	0.83%	New
Margin of victory		32,942	26.18%	▲25.78
Turnout		125,843	68.16%	▼4.12
Total valid votes		125,833		
Registered electors		184,640		▲18.48
BJP gain from INC		Swing	▲8.14	

=== Assembly Election 1999 ===
1999 Karnataka Legislative Assembly election : Mudhol
Party	Candidate	Votes	%	±%
INC	R. B. Timmapur	53,097	48.93%	▲26.61
JD(U)	Karjol Govind Maktappa	52,658	48.53%	New
JD(S)	Gasti Basappa Ningappa	2,757	2.54%	New
Margin of victory		439	0.40%	▼24.96
Turnout		112,648	72.28%	▲3.19
Total valid votes		108,512		
Rejected ballots		4,045	3.59%	▲0.44
Registered electors		155,843		▲14.02
INC gain from JD		Swing	▲1.24	

=== Assembly Election 1994 ===
1994 Karnataka Legislative Assembly election : Mudhol
Party	Candidate	Votes	%	±%
JD	Govind Karjol	43,613	47.69%	▲17.23
INC	R. B. Timmapur	20,416	22.32%	▼29.28
BJP	Bajantri Keshav. B	11,715	12.81%	▲11.95
KRRS	Metri Ramesh Tippanna	7,619	8.33%	New
INC	Sannakki Shankar Duragappa	2,834	3.10%	New
Independent	Kambi Siddalingayya Kalyanayya	2,638	2.88%	New
RPI	Sherkani Dharamaji Narasingh	1,407	1.54%	New
Margin of victory		23,197	25.36%	▲4.22
Turnout		94,431	69.09%	▼2.28
Total valid votes		91,453		
Rejected ballots		2,978	3.15%	▼4.02
Registered electors		136,678		▲11.07
JD gain from INC		Swing	▼3.91	

=== Assembly Election 1989 ===
1989 Karnataka Legislative Assembly election : Mudhol
Party	Candidate	Votes	%	±%
INC	R. B. Timmapur	42,073	51.60%	▲13.38
JD	Jamakhandi Bhimappa Gangappa	24,834	30.46%	New
Kranti Sabha	Madar Krishnappa Yallappa	11,866	14.55%	New
JP	Kesaragoppa Mahadev Lakkappa	1,748	2.14%	New
BJP	Chalavadi Ashok Somappa	699	0.86%	New
Margin of victory		17,239	21.14%	▼0.53
Turnout		87,826	71.37%	▼2.41
Total valid votes		81,531		
Rejected ballots		6,295	7.17%	▲4.90
Registered electors		123,052		▲30.71
INC gain from JP		Swing	▼8.29	

=== Assembly Election 1985 ===
1985 Karnataka Legislative Assembly election : Mudhol
Party	Candidate	Votes	%	±%
JP	Jamakhandi Bhimappa Gangappa	40,656	59.89%	▲52.96
INC	Kattimani Ashok Krishnaji	25,944	38.22%	▼22.13
Independent	Simpiger Bapanant Maruti	657	0.97%	New
Independent	Mannekeri Siddappajamvakka	622	0.92%	New
Margin of victory		14,712	21.67%	▼8.80
Turnout		69,455	73.78%	▲9.20
Total valid votes		67,879		
Rejected ballots		1,576	2.27%	▼1.57
Registered electors		94,139		▲14.87
JP gain from INC		Swing	▼0.46	

=== Assembly Election 1983 ===
1983 Karnataka Legislative Assembly election : Mudhol
Party	Candidate	Votes	%	±%
INC	Kattimani Ashok Krishnaji	30,713	60.35%	▲51.53
Independent	Kale Surendra Kalasappa	15,204	29.87%	New
JP	Jainapur Prabhu Vithalarao	3,526	6.93%	▼34.33
Independent	Mang Snivarudrappa Kalappa	667	1.31%	New
Independent	Myageri Ramappa Satvappa	504	0.99%	New
Margin of victory		15,509	30.47%	▲21.82
Turnout		52,928	64.58%	▼5.71
Total valid votes		50,895		
Rejected ballots		2,033	3.84%	▲0.01
Registered electors		81,956		▲9.15
INC gain from INC(I)		Swing	▲10.44	

=== Assembly Election 1978 ===
1978 Karnataka Legislative Assembly election : Mudhol
Party	Candidate	Votes	%	±%
INC(I)	Hadimani Alias Kale Jayawant Kalasappa	25,334	49.91%	New
JP	Kattimani Ashok Krishnaji	20,944	41.26%	New
INC	Dodamani Sangameshwar Bhimarao	4,477	8.82%	▼46.71
Margin of victory		4,390	8.65%	▼3.37
Turnout		52,779	70.29%	▲1.17
Total valid votes		50,755		
Rejected ballots		2,024	3.83%	▲3.83
Registered electors		75,088		▲4.15
INC(I) gain from INC		Swing	▼5.62	

=== Assembly Election 1972 ===
1972 Mysore State Legislative Assembly election : Mudhol
Party	Candidate	Votes	%	±%
INC	N. K. Pandappa	26,851	55.53%	▲9.50
INC(O)	Hiralal Bandulal Shah	21,040	43.51%	New
ABJS	Kulloli Madevirappa	462	0.96%	New
Margin of victory		5,811	12.02%	▲6.21
Turnout		49,829	69.12%	▼1.15
Total valid votes		48,353		
Registered electors		72,093		▲21.02
INC gain from SWA		Swing	▲3.68	

=== Assembly Election 1967 ===
1967 Mysore State Legislative Assembly election : Mudhol
Party	Candidate	Votes	%	±%
SWA	N. K. Pandappa	20,186	51.85%	▲5.73
INC	N. N. Kallappa	17,922	46.03%	▼6.75
Independent	G. H. Gangappa	827	2.12%	New
Margin of victory		2,264	5.81%	▼0.85
Turnout		41,860	70.27%	▲1.96
Total valid votes		38,935		
Registered electors		59,571		▲3.68
SWA gain from INC		Swing	▼0.93	

=== Assembly Election 1962 ===
1962 Mysore State Legislative Assembly election : Mudhol
Party	Candidate	Votes	%	±%
INC	Ningappa Kallappa Naik	19,575	52.78%	▼11.98
SWA	Nadgouda Krishnappa Pandappa	17,105	46.12%	New
ABJS	Irappa Basappa Gangannavar	410	1.11%	New
Margin of victory		2,470	6.66%	▼22.86
Turnout		39,252	68.31%	▲6.16
Total valid votes		37,090		
Registered electors		57,458		▲15.42
INC hold		Swing	▼11.98	

=== Assembly Election 1957 ===
1957 Mysore State Legislative Assembly election : Mudhol
Party	Candidate	Votes	%	±%
INC	Hiralal Bandulal Shah	20,036	64.76%	▼6.20
Independent	Nadgouda Krishnappa Pandappa	10,904	35.24%	New
Margin of victory		9,132	29.52%	▼28.21
Turnout		30,940	62.15%	▲5.43
Total valid votes		30,940		
Registered electors		49,781		▲3.61
INC hold		Swing	▼6.20	

=== Assembly Election 1952 ===
1952 Bombay State Legislative Assembly election : Mudhol
Party	Candidate	Votes	%	±%
INC	Hiralal Bandulal Shah	19,340	70.96%	New
KMPP	Nadgouda Krishnappa Pandappa	3,606	13.23%	New
Independent	Sakri Dundappa Holebasappa	2,645	9.71%	New
Independent	Pukale Narayan Bhimrao	1,662	6.10%	New
Margin of victory		15,734	57.73%	
Turnout		27,253	56.72%	
Total valid votes		27,253		
Registered electors		48,048		
INC win (new seat)				

== See also ==
- List of constituencies of the Karnataka Legislative Assembly
