= Hiriyur Assembly constituency =

Legislative Assembly constituency in Karnataka State, India

Coordinates: 13.95°N 76.61°E

Hiriyur
- Constituency No. 100 for the Karnataka Legislative Assembly

Constituency details
- Country: India
- Region: South India
- State: Karnataka
- District: Chitradurga
- Lok Sabha constituency: Chitradurga
- Established: 1951
- Total electors: 243,619
- Reservation: None

Member of Legislative Assembly
- 16th Karnataka Legislative Assembly
- Incumbent Vacant

Hiriyur Assembly constituency is one of the 224 Legislative Assembly constituencies of Karnataka in India.

It is part of Chitradurga district.

== Members of the Legislative Assembly ==
Election	Member	Party
1952	V. Masiyappa	Indian National Congress
1952	T. Hanumiah	Indian National Congress
1957	K. Kenchappa	Praja Socialist Party
1962	V. Masiyappa	Indian National Congress
1967	D. Manjunath	Indian National Congress
1972	K. H. Ranganath	Indian National Congress
1978	K. H. Ranganath	Indian National Congress
1983	K. H. Ranganath	Indian National Congress
1985	R. Ramaiah	Indian National Congress
1989	K. H. Ranganath	Indian National Congress
1994	D. Manjunath	Janata Dal
1999	K. H. Ranganath	Indian National Congress
2004	D. Manjunath	Janata Dal
2008	D. Sudhakar	Independent politician
2013	D. Sudhakar	Indian National Congress
2018	Poornima Krishnappa	Bharatiya Janata Party
2023	D. Sudhakar	Indian National Congress

== Election results ==
=== Assembly Election 2023 ===
2023 Karnataka Legislative Assembly election : Hiriyur
Party	Candidate	Votes	%	±%
INC	D. Sudhakar	92,050	46.02	▲11.66
BJP	Poornima Krishnappa	61,728	30.86	▼10.31
JD(S)	M. Raveendrappa	38,686	19.34	▼2.93
KRPP	H. Mahesh	1,520	0.76	New
AAP	K. T. Thippeswamy	1,407	0.70	New
NOTA	None of the above	691	0.35	▼0.26
Margin of victory		30,322	15.16	▲8.34
Turnout		200,182	82.17	▲1.97
Total valid votes		200,016		
Registered electors		243,619		▲3.45
INC gain from BJP		Swing	▲4.85	

=== Assembly Election 2018 ===
2018 Karnataka Legislative Assembly election : Hiriyur
Party	Candidate	Votes	%	±%
BJP	Poornima Krishnappa	77,733	41.17	▲39.11
INC	D. Sudhakar	64,858	34.36	▼16.83
JD(S)	D. Yashodhara	42,044	22.27	▼28.05
NOTA	None of the above	1,160	0.61	New
Margin of victory		12,875	6.82	▲5.96
Turnout		188,869	80.20	▲5.95
Total valid votes		188,787		
Registered electors		235,486		▲8.93
BJP gain from INC		Swing	▼10.02	

=== Assembly Election 2013 ===
2013 Karnataka Legislative Assembly election : Hiriyur
Party	Candidate	Votes	%	±%
INC	D. Sudhakar	71,661	51.19	▲45.10
JD(S)	A. Krishnappa	70,456	50.32	▲35.66
BSRCP	M. Jayanna	6,965	4.97	New
BJP	S. Siddesh Yadav	2,880	2.06	▼17.80
KJP	M. Thippeswamy	2,570	1.84	New
Independent	C. Nataraja	1,418	1.01	New
Independent	B. T. Shanthanna	1,024	0.73	New
BSP	S. H. Kantharaj Huli	1,008	0.72	▼1.35
Margin of victory		1,205	0.86	▼11.22
Turnout		160,501	74.25	▲9.81
Total valid votes		140,003		
Registered electors		216,172		▲2.68
INC gain from Independent		Swing	▲19.25	

=== Assembly Election 2008 ===
2008 Karnataka Legislative Assembly election : Hiriyur
Party	Candidate	Votes	%	±%
Independent	D. Sudhakar	43,299	31.94	New
BJP	Lakshmikantha. N. R	26,921	19.86	▲0.06
JD(S)	D. Yashodhara	19,876	14.66	▼28.75
Independent	Majunatha. G. S	17,821	13.15	New
INC	Geetha Nandini Gowda. P. S	8,251	6.09	▼24.97
Independent	Manjunath. R	7,622	5.62	New
Independent	Thippeswamy. V. K	3,164	2.33	New
BSP	H. J. Kantharaj	2,809	2.07	New
Independent	A. V. Umapathi	1,844	1.36	New
Margin of victory		16,378	12.08	▼0.26
Turnout		135,676	64.44	▲2.70
Total valid votes		135,568		
Registered electors		210,539		▲28.98
Independent gain from JD(S)		Swing	▼11.47	

=== Assembly Election 2004 ===
2004 Karnataka Legislative Assembly election : Hiriyur
Party	Candidate	Votes	%	±%
JD(S)	D. Manjunath	43,749	43.41	▲5.63
INC	Manjunath. G. S	31,310	31.06	▼16.92
BJP	Bheemaiah. B	19,959	19.80	▲8.93
Independent	R. Ramaiah	3,162	3.14	New
Kannada Nadu Party	Thimmaiah. B	1,597	1.58	New
Independent	M. Thippeswamy	1,012	1.00	New
Margin of victory		12,439	12.34	▲2.13
Turnout		100,790	61.74	▼7.15
Total valid votes		100,789		
Registered electors		163,238		▲12.95
JD(S) gain from INC		Swing	▼4.57	

=== Assembly Election 1999 ===
1999 Karnataka Legislative Assembly election : Hiriyur
Party	Candidate	Votes	%	±%
INC	K. H. Ranganath	45,415	47.98	▲20.76
JD(S)	D. Manjunath	35,755	37.78	New
BJP	B. Kashi Vishwanatha Naik	10,289	10.87	▲7.30
Independent	Yelanadu Thippeswamy	2,109	2.23	New
Independent	M. Thippeswamy	1,080	1.14	New
Margin of victory		9,660	10.21	▼11.75
Turnout		99,562	68.89	▲1.36
Total valid votes		94,648		
Rejected ballots		4,882	4.90	▲2.97
Registered electors		144,522		▲7.21
INC gain from JD		Swing	▼1.21	

=== Assembly Election 1994 ===
1994 Karnataka Legislative Assembly election : Hiriyur
Party	Candidate	Votes	%	±%
JD	D. Manjunath	43,911	49.19	▲21.40
INC	K. H. Ranganath	24,302	27.22	▼16.40
INC	R. Chandraiah	17,036	19.08	New
BJP	G. Rajashekar	3,185	3.57	New
Margin of victory		19,609	21.96	▲6.13
Turnout		91,036	67.53	▲5.88
Total valid votes		89,277		
Rejected ballots		1,758	1.93	▼4.44
Registered electors		134,802		▲0.67
JD gain from INC		Swing	▲5.57	

=== Assembly Election 1989 ===
1989 Karnataka Legislative Assembly election : Hiriyur
Party	Candidate	Votes	%	±%
INC	K. H. Ranganath	33,717	43.62	▼10.43
JD	B. Basappa	21,479	27.79	New
JP	D. Prasanna Kumar	12,180	15.76	New
Kranti Sabha	V. T. Ramakrishna	6,943	8.98	New
Independent	N. Babu Naik	1,157	1.50	New
Margin of victory		12,238	15.83	▲5.74
Turnout		82,553	61.65	▲4.17
Total valid votes		77,296		
Rejected ballots		5,257	6.37	▲5.32
Registered electors		133,908		▲26.50
INC hold		Swing	▼10.43	

=== Assembly Election 1985 ===
1985 Karnataka Legislative Assembly election : Hiriyur
Party	Candidate	Votes	%	±%
INC	R. Ramaiah	32,542	54.05	▲1.22
JP	T. Thippanna	26,464	43.95	▼1.21
Independent	H. K. Virupakshappa	422	0.70	New
Independent	N. B. Swamy	396	0.66	New
Margin of victory		6,078	10.09	▲2.42
Turnout		60,850	57.48	▼9.91
Total valid votes		60,210		
Rejected ballots		640	1.05	▼0.82
Registered electors		105,859		▲16.81
INC hold		Swing	▲1.22	

=== Assembly Election 1983 ===
1983 Karnataka Legislative Assembly election : Hiriyur
Party	Candidate	Votes	%	±%
INC	K. H. Ranganath	31,667	52.83	▲50.06
JP	T. Thippanna	27,069	45.16	▲17.08
Independent	H. Thimmaiah	625	1.04	New
Independent	Visweswaraiah	576	0.96	New
Margin of victory		4,598	7.67	▼32.96
Turnout		61,078	67.39	▼7.63
Total valid votes		59,937		
Rejected ballots		1,141	1.87	▼0.29
Registered electors		90,627		▲11.65
INC gain from INC(I)		Swing	▼15.88	

=== Assembly Election 1978 ===
1978 Karnataka Legislative Assembly election : Hiriyur
Party	Candidate	Votes	%	±%
INC(I)	K. H. Ranganath	40,938	68.71	New
JP	D. Manjunath	16,730	28.08	New
INC	T. V. Ramachandrappa	1,649	2.77	▼82.11
Margin of victory		24,208	40.63	▼29.14
Turnout		60,895	75.02	▲20.55
Total valid votes		59,579		
Rejected ballots		1,316	2.16	▲2.16
Registered electors		81,173		▲10.06
INC(I) gain from INC		Swing	▼16.17	

=== Assembly Election 1972 ===
1972 Mysore State Legislative Assembly election : Hiriyur
Party	Candidate	Votes	%	±%
INC	K. H. Ranganath	33,314	84.88	▲33.21
INC(O)	P. Rangappa	5,933	15.12	New
Margin of victory		27,381	69.77	▲63.24
Turnout		40,178	54.47	▲0.39
Total valid votes		39,247		
Registered electors		73,756		▲14.52
INC hold		Swing	▲33.21	

=== Assembly Election 1967 ===
1967 Mysore State Legislative Assembly election : Hiriyur
Party	Candidate	Votes	%	±%
INC	D. Manjunath	17,034	51.67	▼5.16
Independent	Yellabovi	14,882	45.14	New
RPI	H. C. Keshavan	1,052	3.19	New
Margin of victory		2,152	6.53	▼27.47
Turnout		34,830	54.08	▼19.20
Total valid votes		32,968		
Registered electors		64,406		▼10.99
INC hold		Swing	▼5.16	

=== Assembly Election 1962 ===
1962 Mysore State Legislative Assembly election : Hiriyur
Party	Candidate	Votes	%	±%
INC	V. Masiyappa	29,018	56.83	▲7.13
PSP	P. T. Eswarappa	11,655	22.82	▼27.48
Independent	B. Pathappa	8,545	16.73	New
Independent	Durgapa	1,012	1.98	New
SWA	H. M. A. Khander	833	1.63	New
Margin of victory		17,363	34.00	▲33.41
Turnout		53,023	73.28	▲3.36
Total valid votes		51,063		
Registered electors		72,361		▲19.76
INC gain from PSP		Swing	▲6.53	

=== Assembly Election 1957 ===
1957 Mysore State Legislative Assembly election : Hiriyur
Party	Candidate	Votes	%	±%
PSP	K. Kenchappa	21,249	50.30	New
INC	V. Masiyappa	20,998	49.70	▼3.34
Margin of victory		251	0.59	▼9.82
Turnout		42,247	69.92	▼41.86
Total valid votes		42,247		
Registered electors		60,421		▼20.30
PSP gain from INC		Swing	▲22.16	

=== Assembly Election 1952 ===
1952 Mysore State Legislative Assembly election : Hiriyur
Party	Candidate	Votes	%	±%
INC	V. Masiyappa	23,841	28.14	New
INC	T. Hanumiah	21,100	24.90	New
Independent	K. Kenchappa	15,018	17.72	New
Independent	C. Siddappa	10,742	12.68	New
Socialist	B. M. Rudriah	5,502	6.49	New
Independent	Jatra Naik	5,484	6.47	New
Socialist	Dodda Taippiah	3,048	3.60	New
Margin of victory		8,823	10.41	
Turnout		84,735	55.89	
Total valid votes		84,735		
Registered electors		75,806		
INC win (new seat)				

== See also ==
- List of constituencies of the Karnataka Legislative Assembly
- Chitradurga district
