= A. Narayanaswamy =

Politician from Karnataka, India

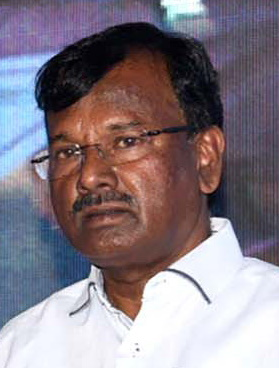
- A. Narayanaswamy in 2022

Minister of State for Social Justice and Empowerment
- In office 7 July 2021 – 11 June 2024
- Prime Minister: Narendra Modi
- Minister: Virendra Kumar Khatik
- Preceded by: Rattan Lal Kataria
- Succeeded by: Ramdas Athawale; B. L. Verma

Cabinet Minister Government of Karnataka
- In office 23 September 2010 – 13 May 2013
- Ministry: Term
- Minister of Social Welfare: 23 September 2010 - 13 May 2013

Member of Parliament, Lok Sabha
- In office 23 May 2019 – 4 June 2024
- Preceded by: B. N. Chandrappa
- Succeeded by: Govind Karjol
- Constituency: Chitradurga

Member of Karnataka Legislative Assembly
- In office 1998–2013
- Preceded by: Y. Ramakrishna
- Succeeded by: B.Shivanna
- Constituency: Anekal

Personal details
- Born: 16 May 1957 (age 69) Anekal, Bangalore district
- Party: Bharatiya Janata Party
- Spouse: T. Vijaya Kumari

Abbaiah Narayanaswamy is an Indian politician. He was Minister of State for Social Justice and Empowerment of India in the Second Modi ministry from 7 July 2021 to 11 June 2024. He is also a member of the Lok Sabha, lower house of the Parliament of India from Chitradurga, Karnataka as a member of the Bharatiya Janata Party. It became a controversy when he was denied entry into village of Pemmanahalli Gollarahatti in Pavagada taluk of Tumakuru district in his own constituency as he belongs to Madiga (Dalit) community.
