= D. Manjunath =

Indian politician (1928–2020)

Minister of Higher Education, Government of Karnataka
- In office 2004–2006

Minister of Revenue, Government of Karnataka
- In office 1998–1999

Minister of Education, Government of Karnataka
- In office 1986–1987

Chairman, Karnataka Legislative Council
- In office 1987–1992
- Preceded by: S. Mallikarjunaiah
- Succeeded by: B. R. Patil

Deputy Speaker of Karnataka Legislative Assembly
- In office 1967–1972
- Succeeded by: B. P. Kadam

Personal details
- Born: 26 August 1928 Jajoor Village, Challakere Taluk, Kingdom of Mysore, British India (now Karnataka, India)
- Died: 3 February 2020 (aged 91) Bangalore, Karnataka, India
- Party: Janata Dal (Secular)
- Other political affiliations: Janata Dal; Janata Party; Indian National Congress

D. Manjunath (26 August 1928 – 3 February 2020) was an Indian politician. He was first elected to Karnataka Legislative Assembly in 1967 on Congress party ticket. In 1977, he joined Janata Party. He also served as State President of Janata Party in Karnataka. In 1983, he was nominated as Member of Legislative Council in Karnataka. He served as minister in various ministries from 1985 to 1987. On 2 September 1987, he was elected as Chairman of Karnataka Legislative Council.

In J. H. Patel government, he served as Revenue minister. Between 2004 and 2006, he served as Higher Education Minister in the state government, headed by Dharam Singh.
