= Govind Karjol =

Indian politician

Member of Parliament, Lok Sabha
- Incumbent
- Assumed office 4 June 2024
- Preceded by: A. Narayanaswamy
- Constituency: Chitradurga

Minister of Public Works Department Government of Karnataka
- In office 20 August 2019 – 28 July 2021
- Chief Minister: B. S. Yediyurappa
- Preceded by: H. D. Revanna
- Succeeded by: C. C. Patil

Minister of Social Welfare Government of Karnataka
- In office 20 August 2019 – 12 October 2020
- Chief Minister: B. S. Yediyurappa
- Preceded by: Priyank Kharge
- Succeeded by: B. Sriramulu

Deputy Chief Minister of Karnataka
- In office 26 August 2019 – 28 July 2021 Serving with C. N. Ashwath Narayan and Laxman Savadi
- Governor: Vajubhai Vala; Thawar Chand Gehlot
- Chief Minister: B. S. Yediyurappa
- Preceded by: G. Parameshwara
- Succeeded by: D. K. Shivakumar

Minister of Minor Irrigation Government of Karnataka
- In office 30 May 2008 – 13 May 2013
- Chief Minister: B. S. Yediyurappa; Sadananda Gowda; Jagadish Shettar
- Succeeded by: Shivaraj Tangadagi

Minister of Kannada & Culture Government of Karnataka
- In office 4 August 2011 – 13 May 2013
- Chief Minister: Sadananda Gowda; Jagadish Shettar
- Succeeded by: Umashree

Minister of Planning & Statistics Government of Karnataka
- In office 30 May 2008 – 22 September 2010
- Chief Minister: B. S. Yediyurappa
- Preceded by: Ramachandra Gowda
- Succeeded by: V. S. Acharya

Minister of Food & Civil Supplies Government of Karnataka
- In office 18 February 2006 – 8 October 2007
- Chief Minister: H. D. Kumaraswamy
- Preceded by: H. S. Mahadeva Prasad
- Succeeded by: Haratalu Halappa

Member of Karnataka Legislative Assembly
- In office 2004–2023
- Preceded by: R. B. Timmapur
- Succeeded by: R. B. Timmapur
- Constituency: Mudhol
- In office 1994–1999
- Preceded by: R. B. Timmapur
- Succeeded by: R. B. Timmapur
- Constituency: Mudhol

Minister of Major & Medium Irrigation Government of Karnataka
- In office 4 August 2021 – 13 May 2023
- Chief Minister: Basavaraj Bommai
- Preceded by: Ramesh Jarkiholi

Personal details
- Born: 25 January 1951 (age 75) Karjol, Bijapur district, Mysuru State (present–day Vijayapura district, Karnataka), India
- Party: Bharatiya Janata Party
- Children: 4, Dr. Gopal Karjol, Dr. Uday Karjol, Umesh Karjol, Arun Karjol
- Education: RMG MUDHOL
- Occupation: Politician

Govind Muktappa Karjol (born 1951) is an Indian politician who is the former Minister of Major and Medium Irrigation, water Resources of Karnataka from 4 August 2021 till 15 May 2023.

== Personal life ==
Govind Karjol was born in Karajol, Bijapur, Karnataka. He is born in Karajola Village in Vijayapura district.

== Politics ==
He is a five-term member of Karnataka Legislative Assembly from Mudhol constituency. He was also the Deputy Leader of Opposition in Karnataka Legislative Assembly from 25 May 2018 to 26 July 2019, and he was also serving as the Deputy Leader of the house in Karnataka Legislative Assembly from 26 August 2019.

He is also a Karnataka State Vice-President of BJP.

He was appointed Minister of State, Public Works Department and Social Welfare in 4th B.S.Yediurappa Ministry. He is 5th time winner in Mudhol Legislative Assembly Constituency.

== Constituency ==
He represents the Mudhol constituency.

== Political Party ==
He is from the Bharatiya Janata Party.
