= Jalasangvi =

- village
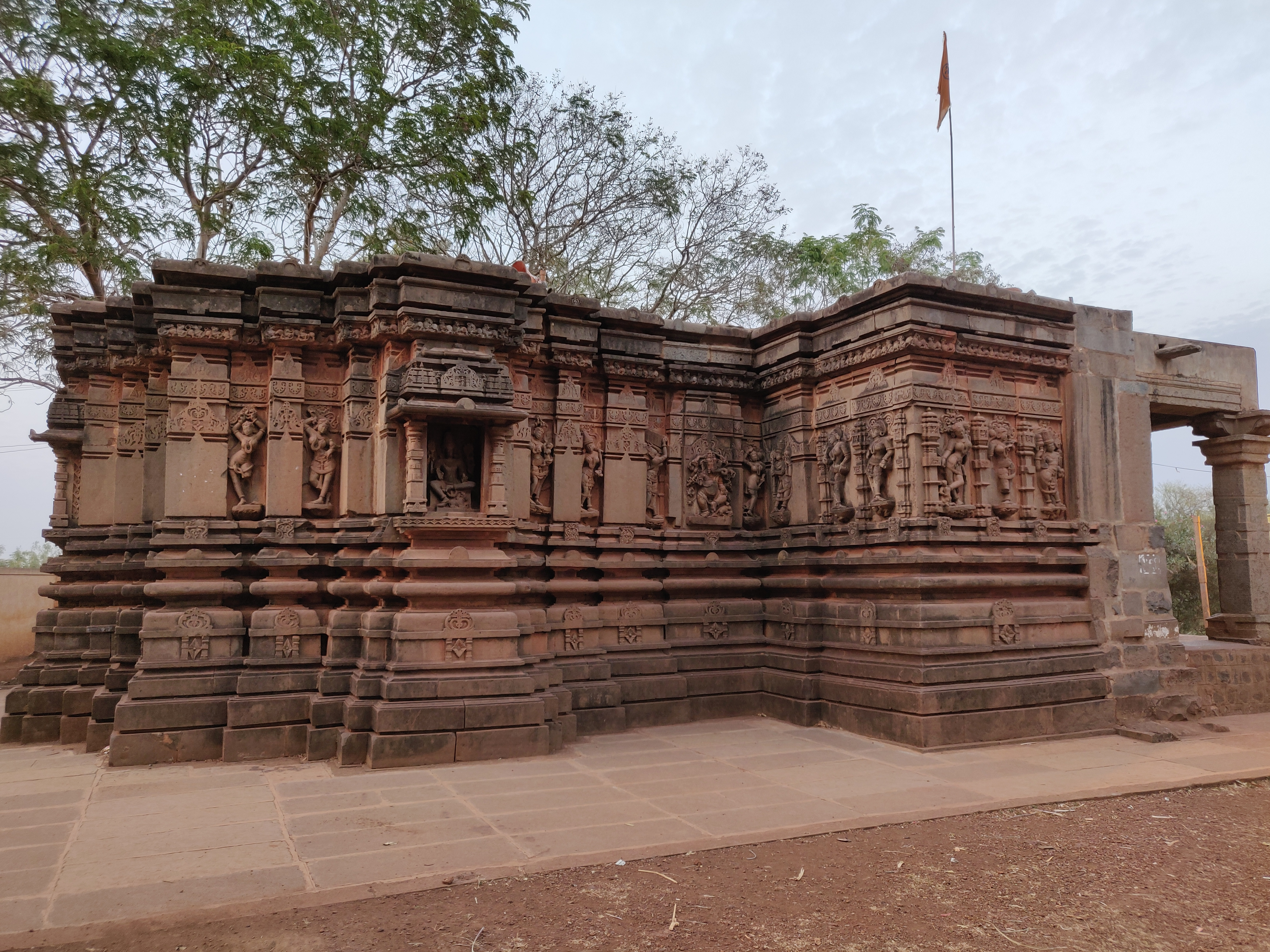
- Iswara temple in Jalasngvi

- Location in Karnataka, India
- Coordinates: 17°49′50″N 77°10′27″E
- Country: India
- State: Karnataka
- District: Bidar
- Talukas: Homnabad

Government
  - Body: Gram panchayat

Languages
  - Official: Kannada
- Time zone: UTC+5:30 (IST)
- ISO 3166 code: IN-KA
- Vehicle registration: KA
- Website: karnataka.gov.in

Jalasangvi (or Jalasangavi or Jalsangi) is a village in Homnabad Taluk, Bidar district, Karnataka, India. It is located close to Dubalgundi, on the Gulbarga - Bidar state highway, at the northern end of Karnataka State. Jalasangvi is famous for its temple ruins.

== Chalukya temples ==
Jalasangvi is a historical place, built by king Vikramaditya VI of the Chalukya dynasty. There is a big pond in the village area, close to which there are some Chalukya temples in various states of ruin.

The Kamalishvara Temple is famous for its outstanding Salabhanjika or Madanika sculptures. These well-endowed feminine figures in seductive tribhanga poses are "...moon breasted, swan-waisted and elephant-hipped", according to the traditional Indian artistic canons. The sculptures of the Jalasangvi temple were the source of inspiration for the later Hoysala bracket-figures of Belur, Halebidu and Somanathapura. This Chalukya temple is built on a star-shaped plan.

People in the area are mainly engaged in dairy-farming, sheep-rearing and sugar-cane cultivation.

== See also ==
- Western Chalukyas
- Malkhed
- Hudgi
- Salabhanjika
- Basavakalyan
