= Sanchi Yakshi Figure =

Sandstone statue of the Shalabhanjika Yakshi

Sanchi Yaskshi Figure
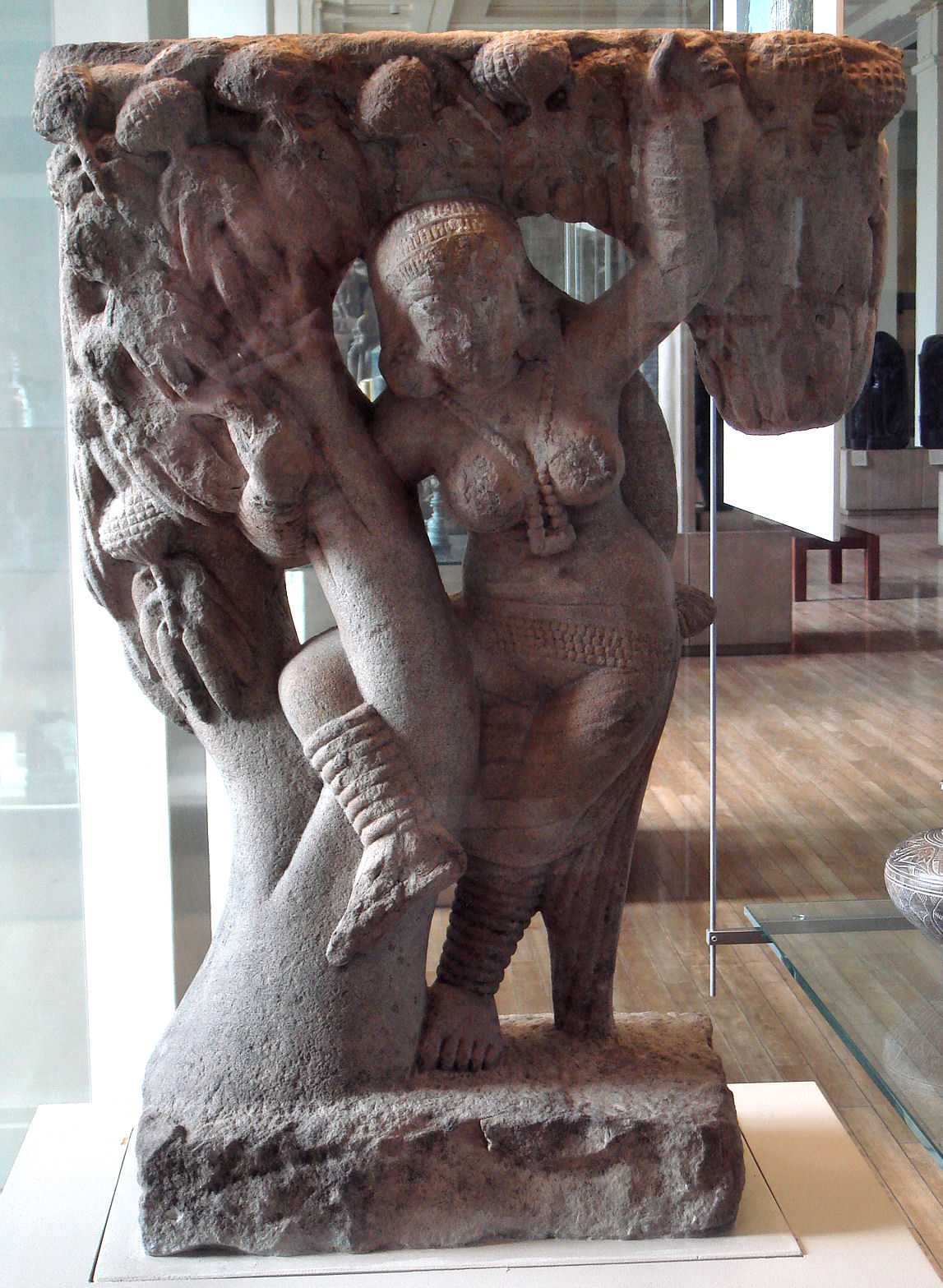
- Bracket figure from Sanchi on display at the British Museum
- Material: Sandstone
- Size: 65 cm High
- Created: 1st Century AD
- Present location: British Museum, London
- Registration: 1842,1210.1

The Sanchi Yakshi Figure is a sandstone statue of the Shalabhanjika Yakshi from the ancient Buddhist site of Sanchi in the state of Madhya Pradesh, India. One of the earliest Buddhist sculptures from the Indian subcontinent, it has been part of the British Museum's collection since 1842.

== History ==
The bejewelled figure of the yakshi was originally installed on one of the gateways that surrounded the Great Stupa at Sanchi, which is said to have contained the relics of the Buddha. In the 1st century AD four toranas or large gateways were erected around the stupa, which served as the main entrances to a circular processional walkway that surrounded the holy building. Made of sandstone, the gateways were elaborately decorated with some of the earliest surviving forms of buddhist iconography. The beam of the western gateway was originally supported by this bracket figure. During the preliminary excavations at the site in the early nineteenth century, it came into the possession of a Mrs. Tucker, who donated it to the British Museum in 1842. One of the few figures from the site in the West, it remains one of the most important early Buddhist sculptures in the museum's collection.

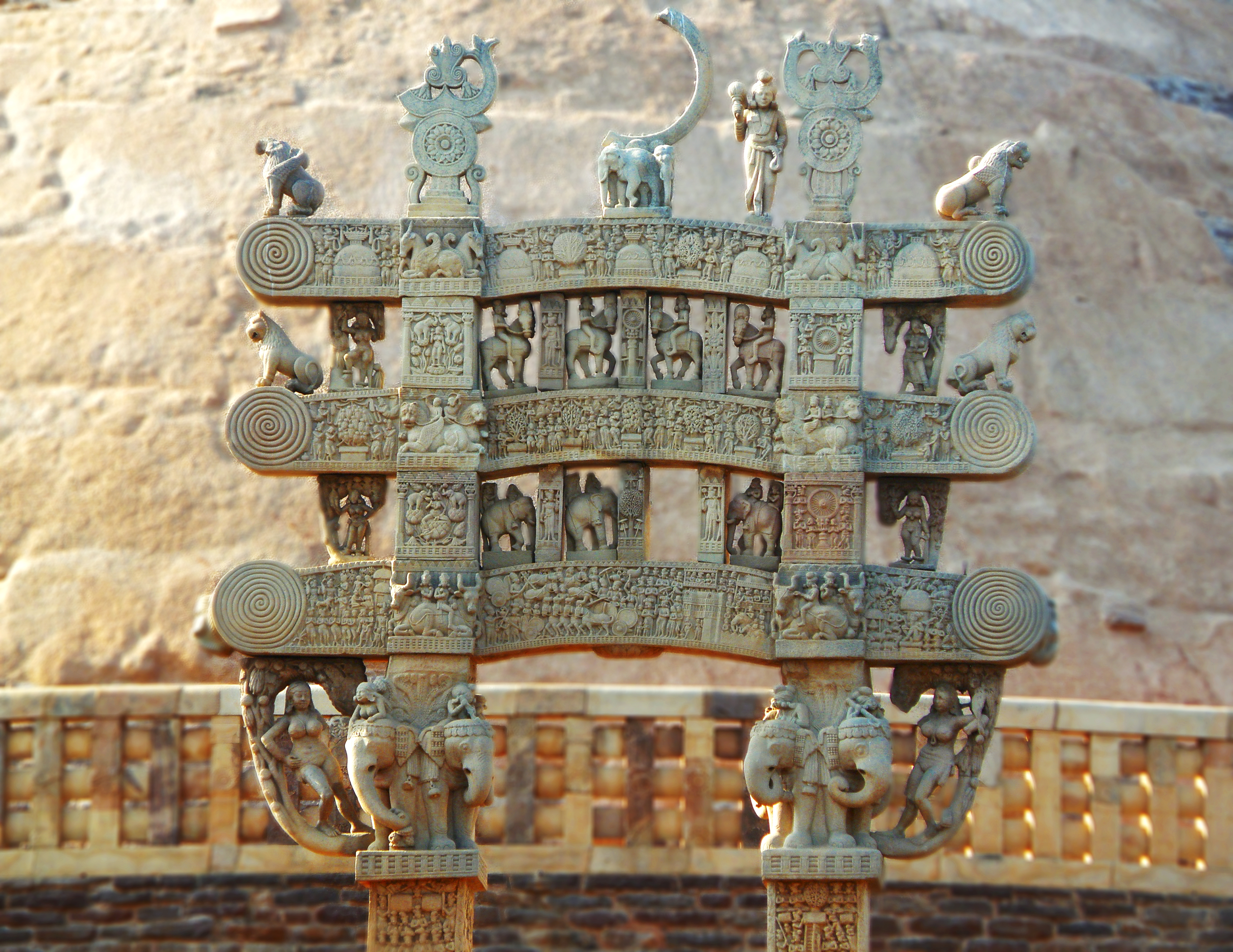
Detail of the northern gate at Sanchi, with similar yakshi brackets below the upper and middle beams.

== Description ==
Carved in white sandstone, the almost nude figure of the yakshi figure is shown clasping onto the branches of a tree with her arms, with her right leg wrapped around its trunk. She is weighed down with ornate jewellery around her neck, waist and ankles. The sculpture also acted as an architectural bracket, supporting a long sandstone beam that once ran above the yakshi's head. The Shalabhanjika Yakshi thus served two purposes: as a fertility symbol associated with the vitality of the fruit-bearing tree and as a structural element supporting the whole configuration of the gateway.
