= Iswara Temple =

Temple in Jalasangvi, Karnataka, India

Iswara temple
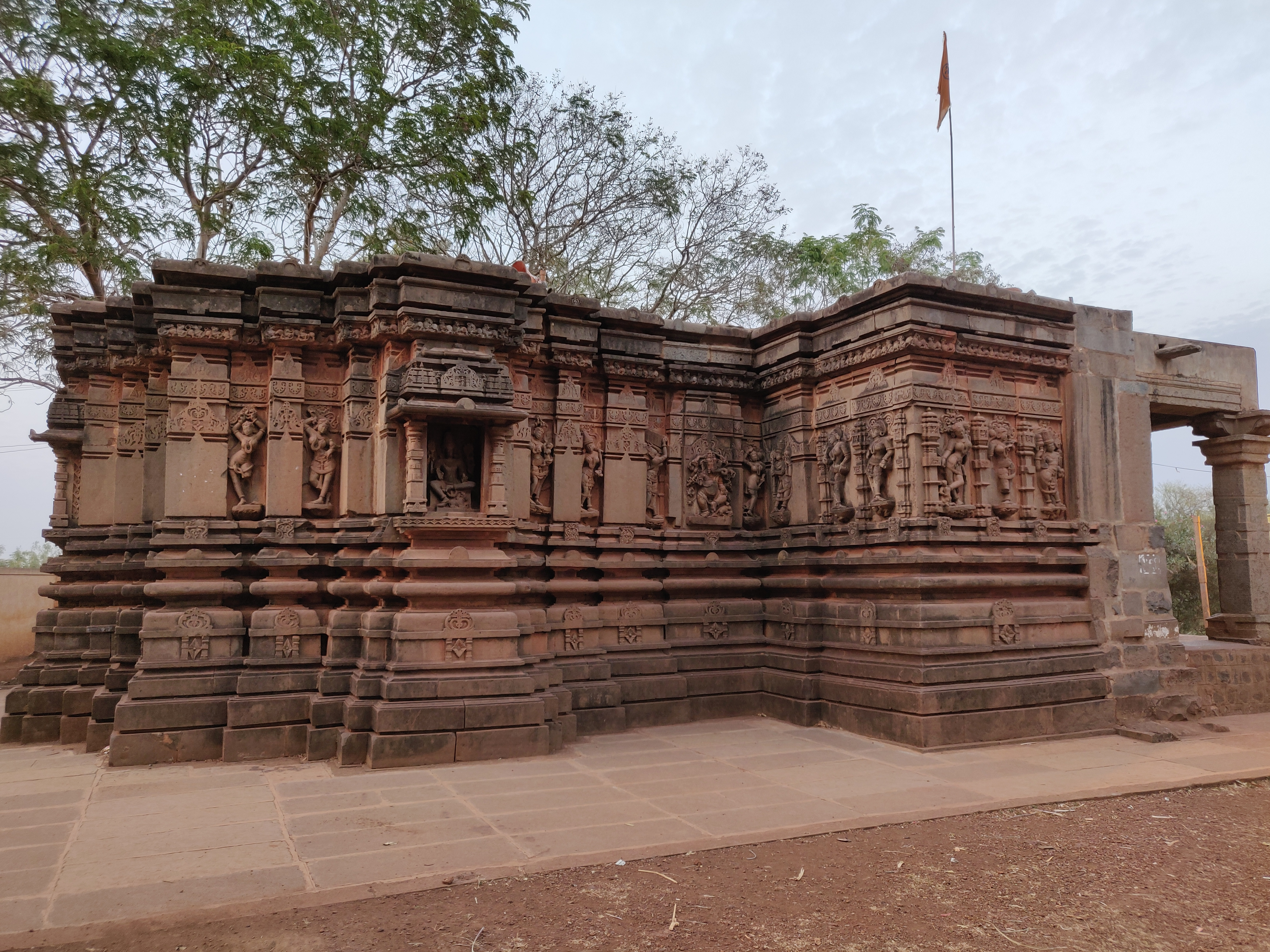
- Side view of the temple

- Location in Karnataka, India

Religion
- Affiliation: Hinduism
- District: Bidar district
- Province: Karnataka
- Deity: Shiva

Location
- Location: Jalasangvi
- Country: India
- Coordinates: 17°49′52.33″N 77°10′34.95″E

Architecture
- Type: Chalukyan
- Completed: 11th century

Specifications
- Temple: 1
- Monument: 1

Iswara temple also known by other names Kamalishwara temple, Kamaleshwara temple, Kalleshwara temple, Eshwara temple is located in Jalasangvi village, about 10 km north-west of Humnabad Taluk of Bidar district, Karnataka, India. According to the inscriptions found the temple was built during the reign of the celebrated emperor Vikramaditya VI of Kalyana Chalukya dynasty.

== Architecture ==
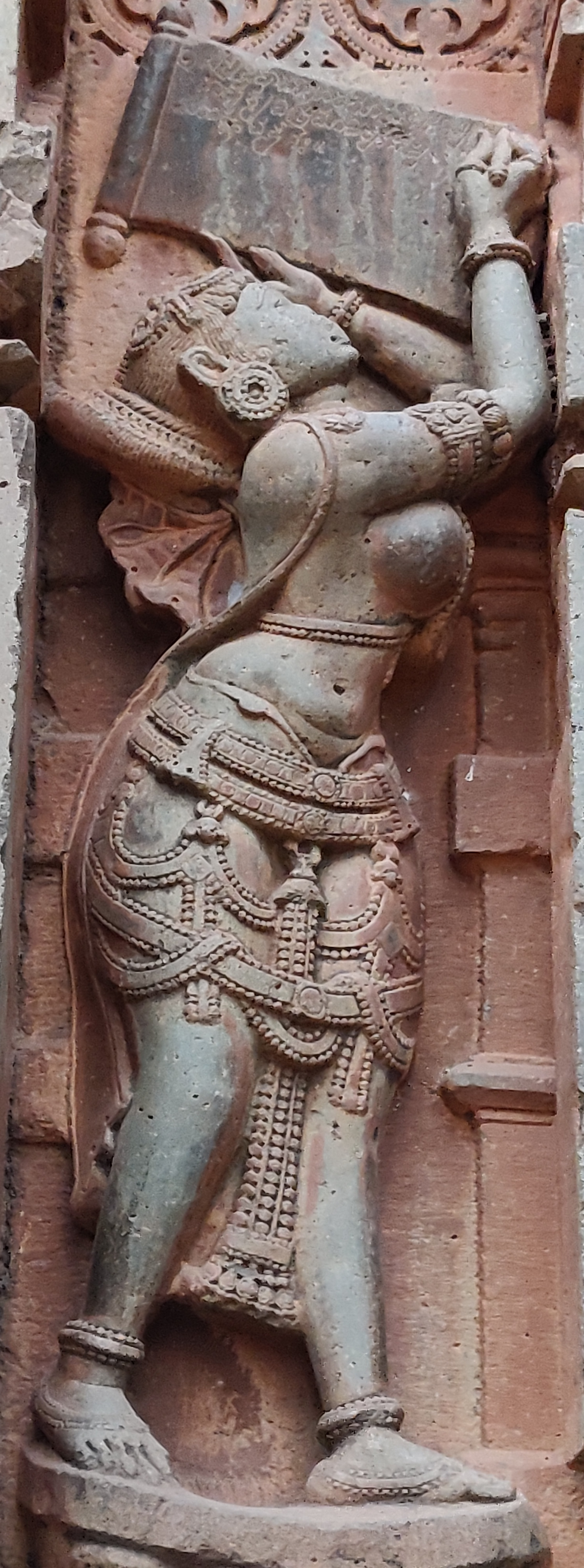
Shasana Sundari inscribing epigraph

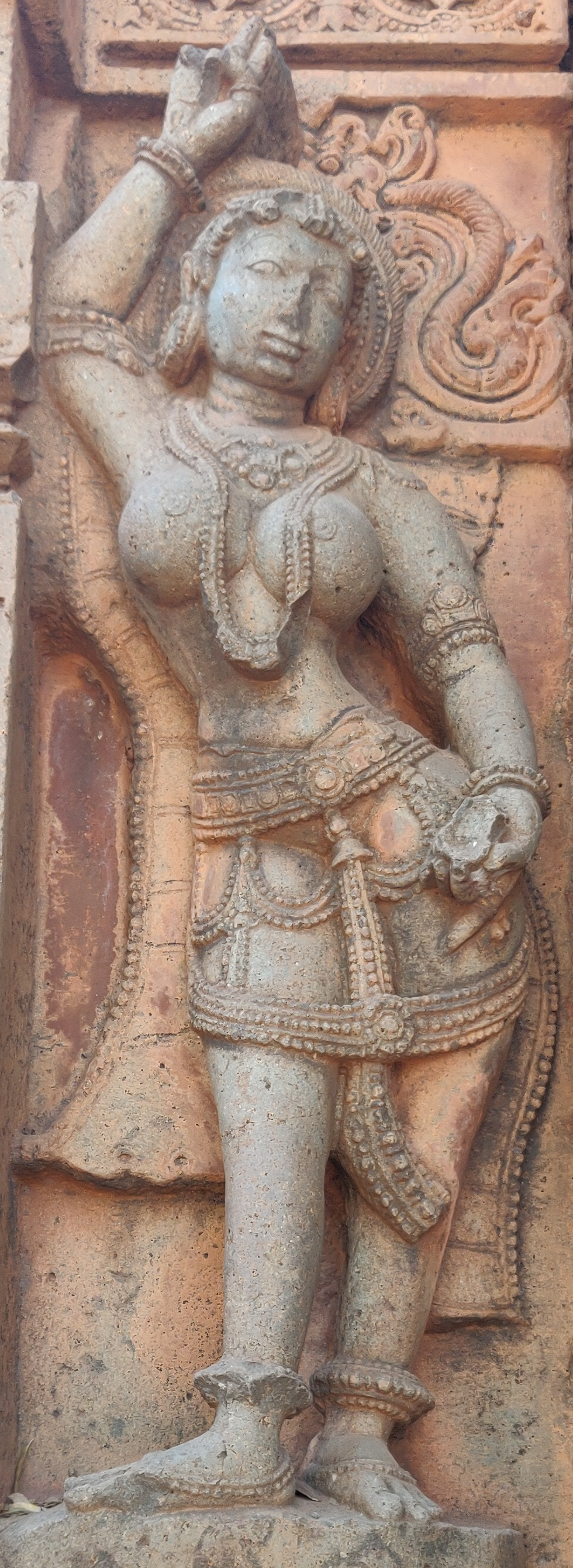
Salabhanjika style figures on the outer walls of the temple

The temple showcases Kalyani Chalukya style of architecture. The temple is constructed near the tank of the village. The temple consist of beautiful sculptured figures both in the interior and exterior surface of the temple. The figures on the exterior of the temple is of Salabhanjika or Mandakini style of sculptures. They are women in different kinds of apparel and with different styles of hairdressing. Some times having maize like items in their hands. These well-endowed feminine figures in seductive tribhanga poses are "...moon breasted, swan-waisted and elephant-hipped", according to the traditional Indian artistic canons. The dancing damsels with rather exaggerated features are heavily decorated with ornaments and attires. The sculptures of the Jalasangvi temple were the source of inspiration for the later Hoysala bracket-figures of Belur, Halebidu and Somanathapura. This Chalukya temple is built on a star-shaped plan. Sculpture of Ganesha is also found in the temple.

One of the main attraction of the temple sculptures is a sculpture of a lady, Shasana Sundari (Shilabalika), a mythological woman, depicted as inscribing Sanskrit epigraph in Kannada characters. The figure in dancing position is seen inscribing the epigraph. The Shasanas praises Vikramaditya VI of the Chalukya dynasty. The writings is deciphered as "Saptadveepodaree Bhutam Bhutalam Sweekarishyati Chalukya Vikramaditya Saptamo Vishnuvardhanaha". The translation is "Vikramaditya of Chalukya Dynasty captured and is ruling the land containing seven islands". It can be noted from the posture of the figure that the body shows a twist beyond the navel as observed in belly twist (jathara parivartanasana). The neck is bent as in akashi mudra.

The temple consist of three chambers. A dance chamber containing eight pillars, Nandi chamber consisting of beautiful carvings and Garbhagriha. There is a linga in the garbhagriha. The entrance of garbhagriha is designed with Dvarapala and Yali designs. The upper portion of the door has a Ganapathi statue.

== Restoration works ==
The Archaeological Survey of India in its report "Indian archaeology 1991-1992 - A Review" released in 1996 tells about the restoration work done in this temple. "The dilapidated veneering stones of the wall were dismantled and reset. Missing slates and beams of roof were reset with new ones. The leaking terrace was provided with weather proof course" as mentioned in the report.

Again the government did restoration work in 2003 pasting big stone slabs and damaging the sculptures. It was alleged that the originality of the temple was spoiled by mixing it with current technology.

== Gallery ==
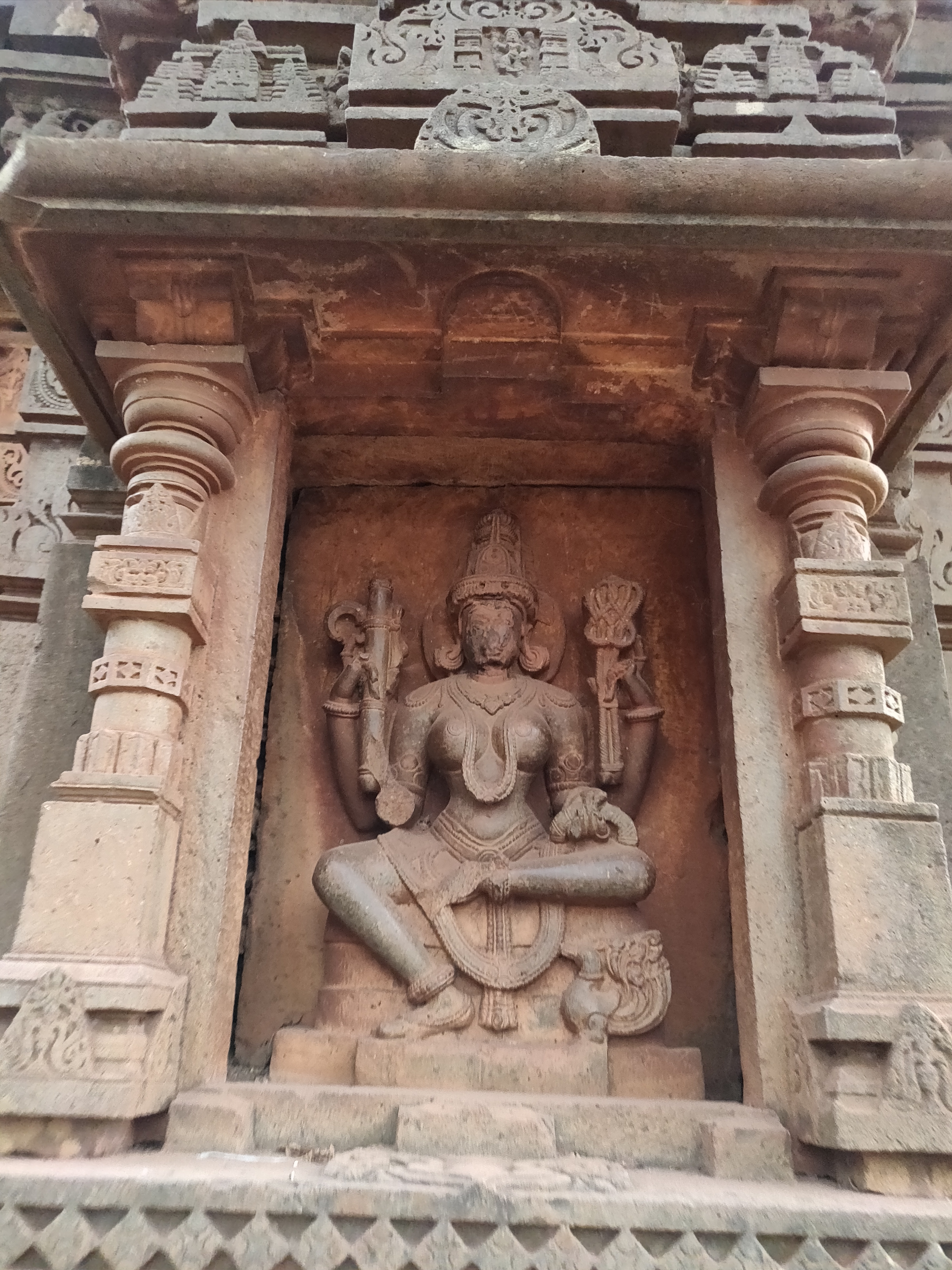
At the back of the temple

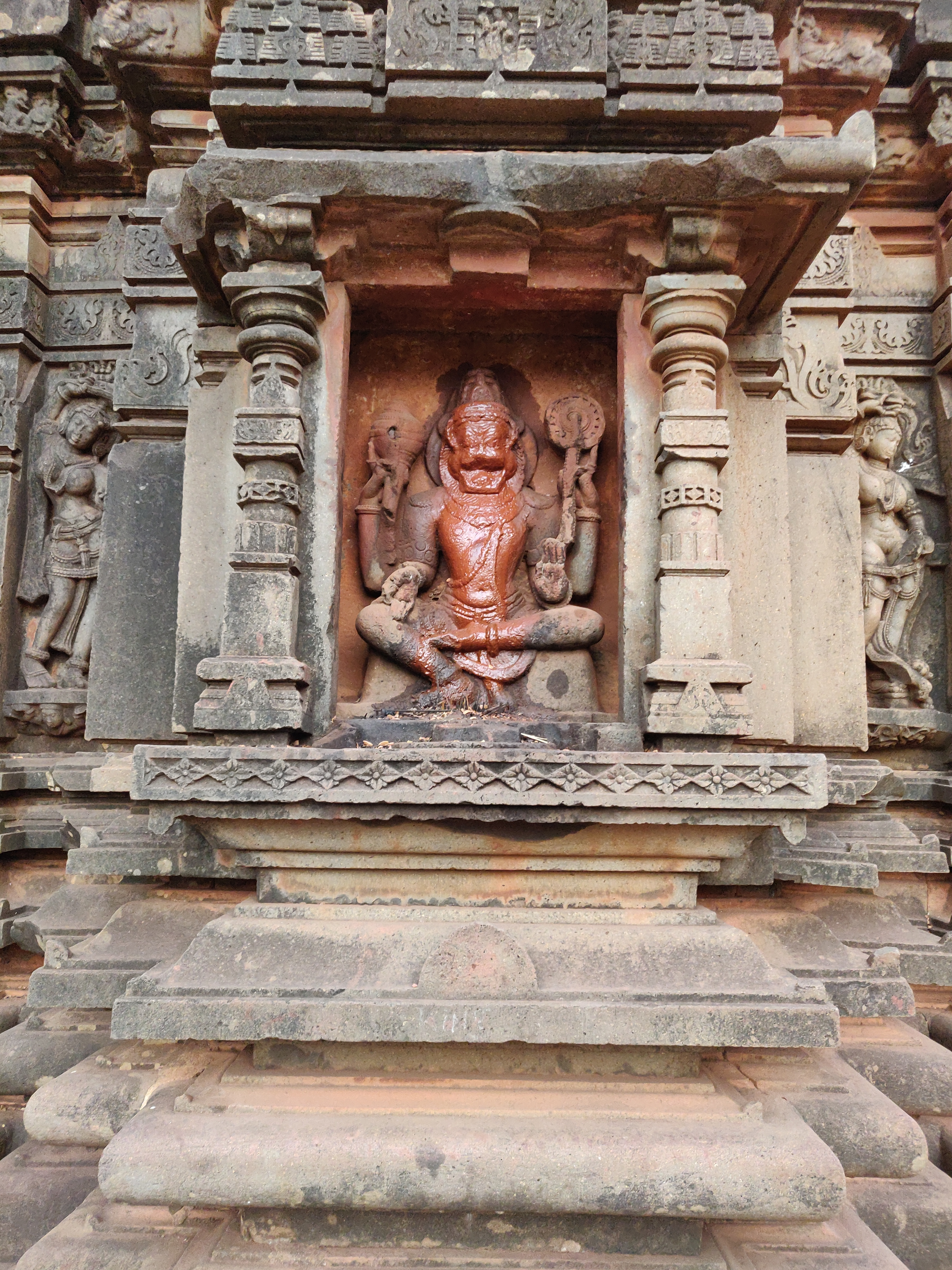
Narasimha

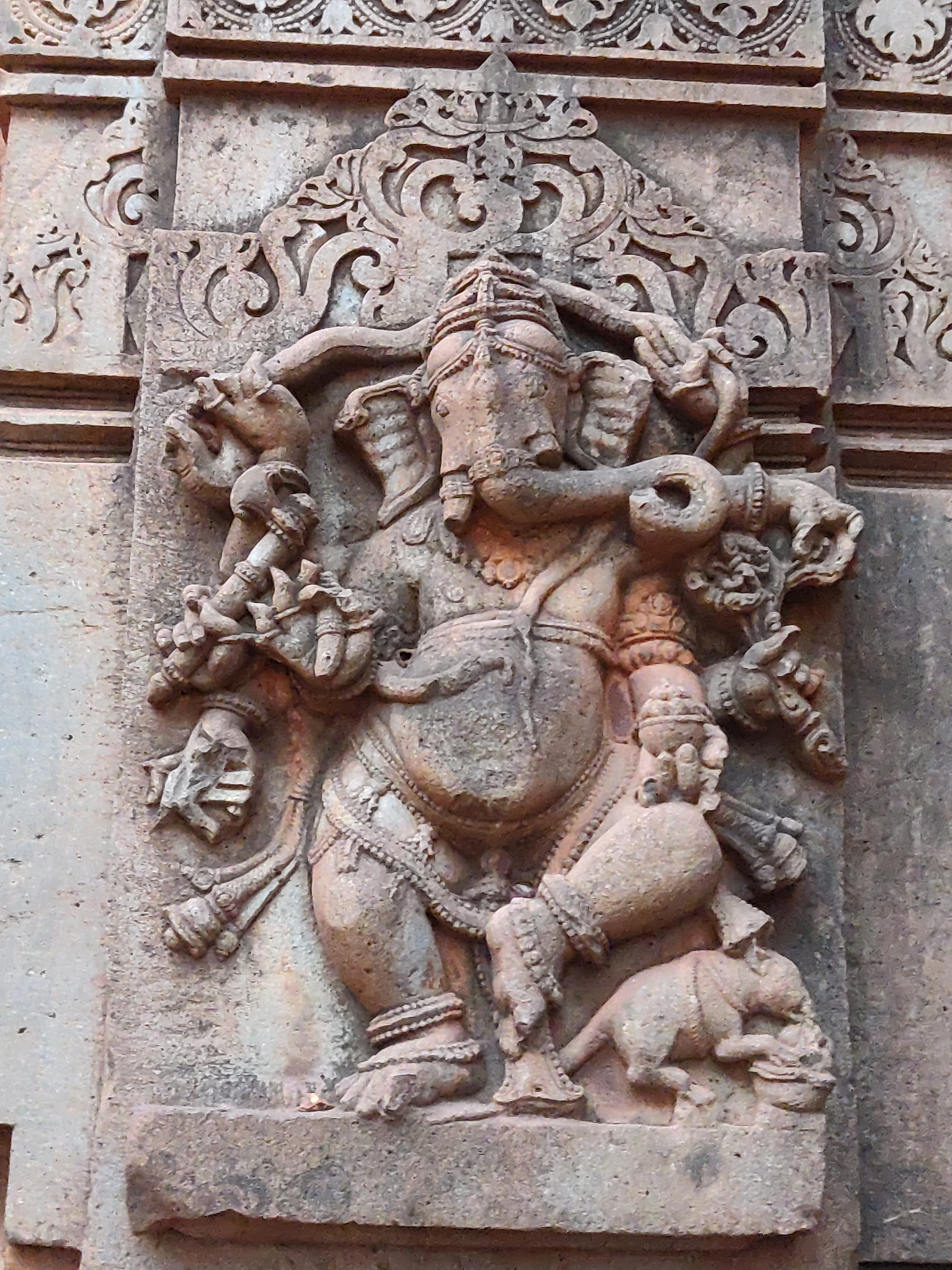
Ganapati

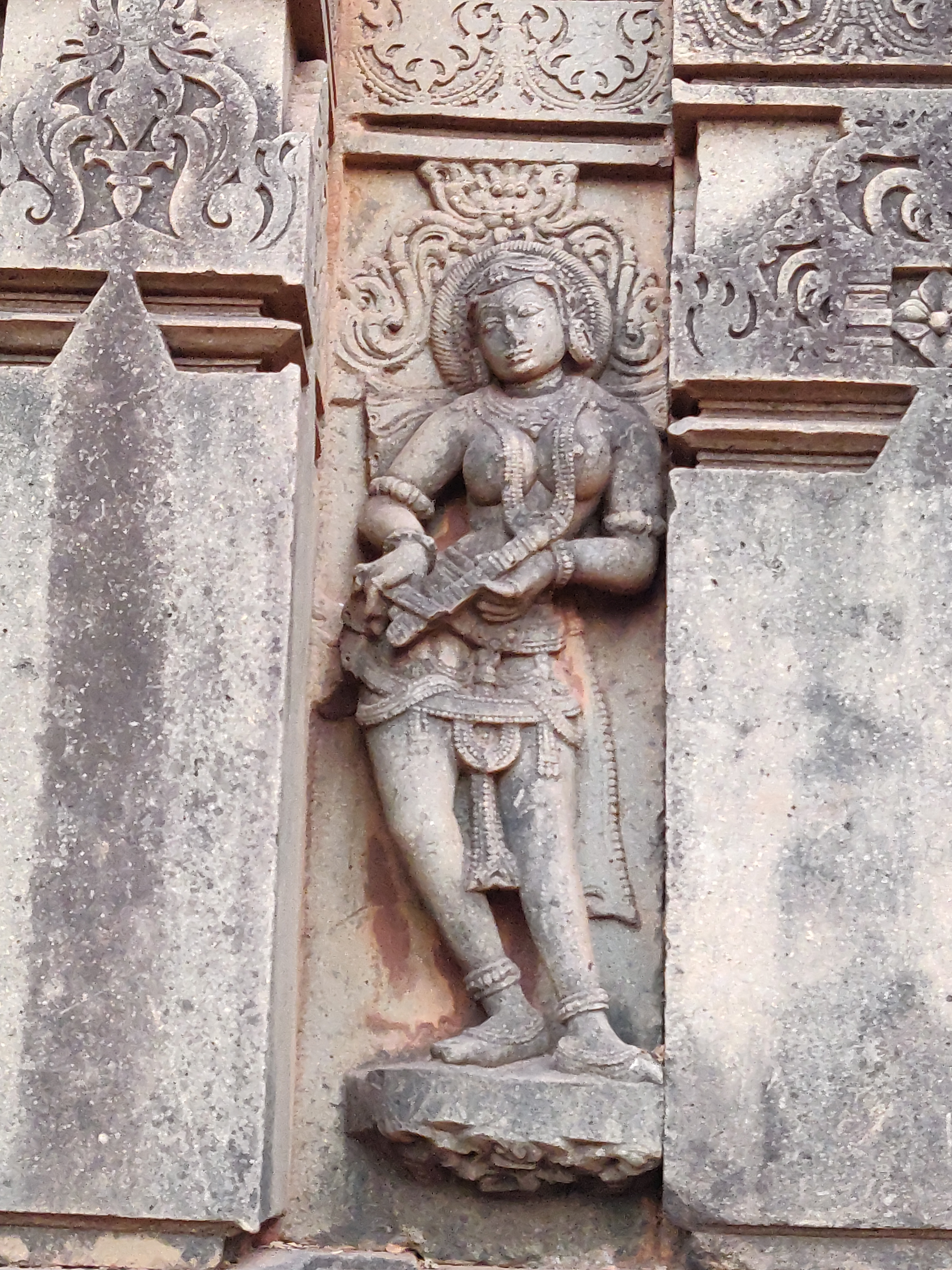

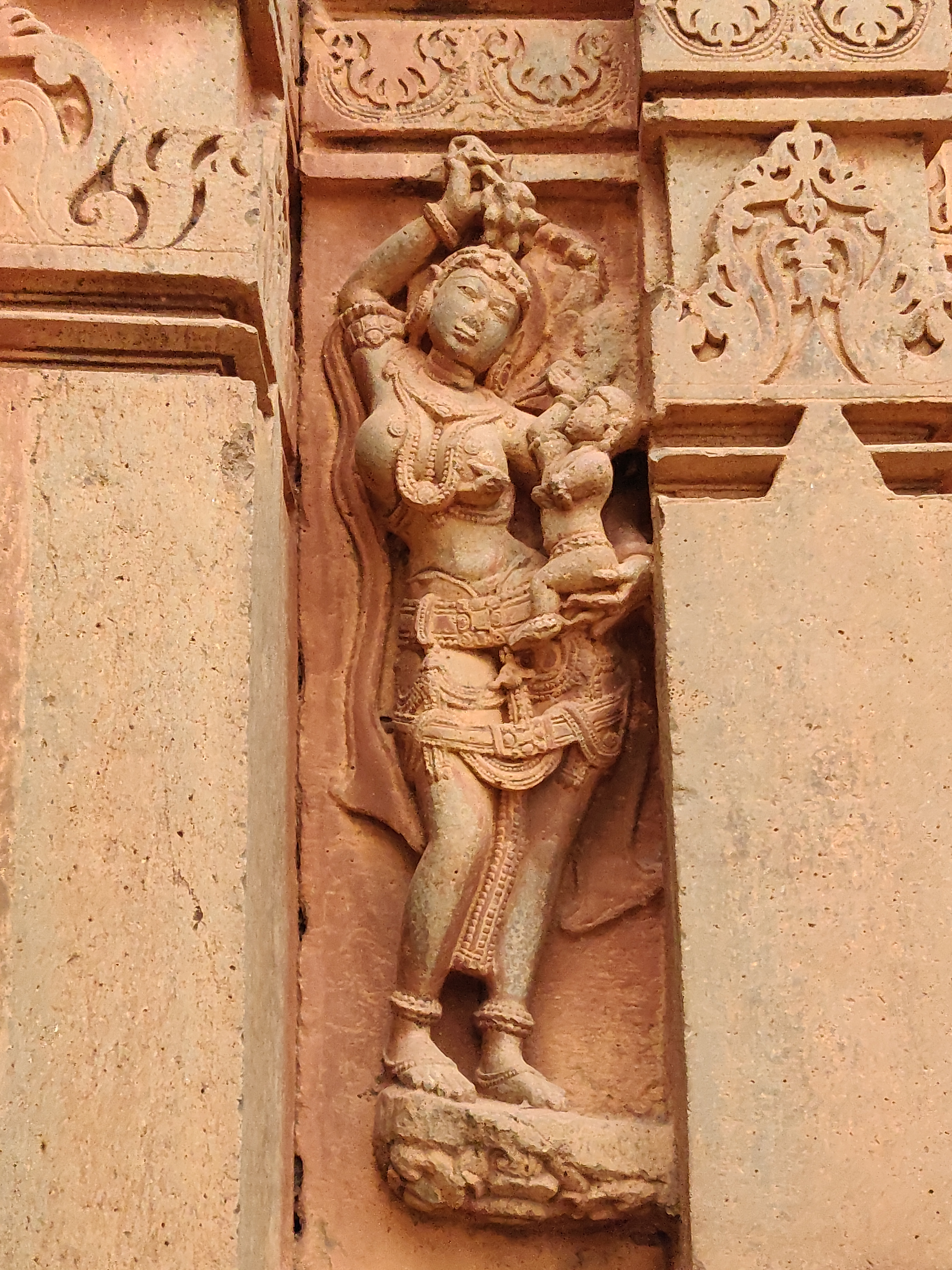
Salabhanjika style figures

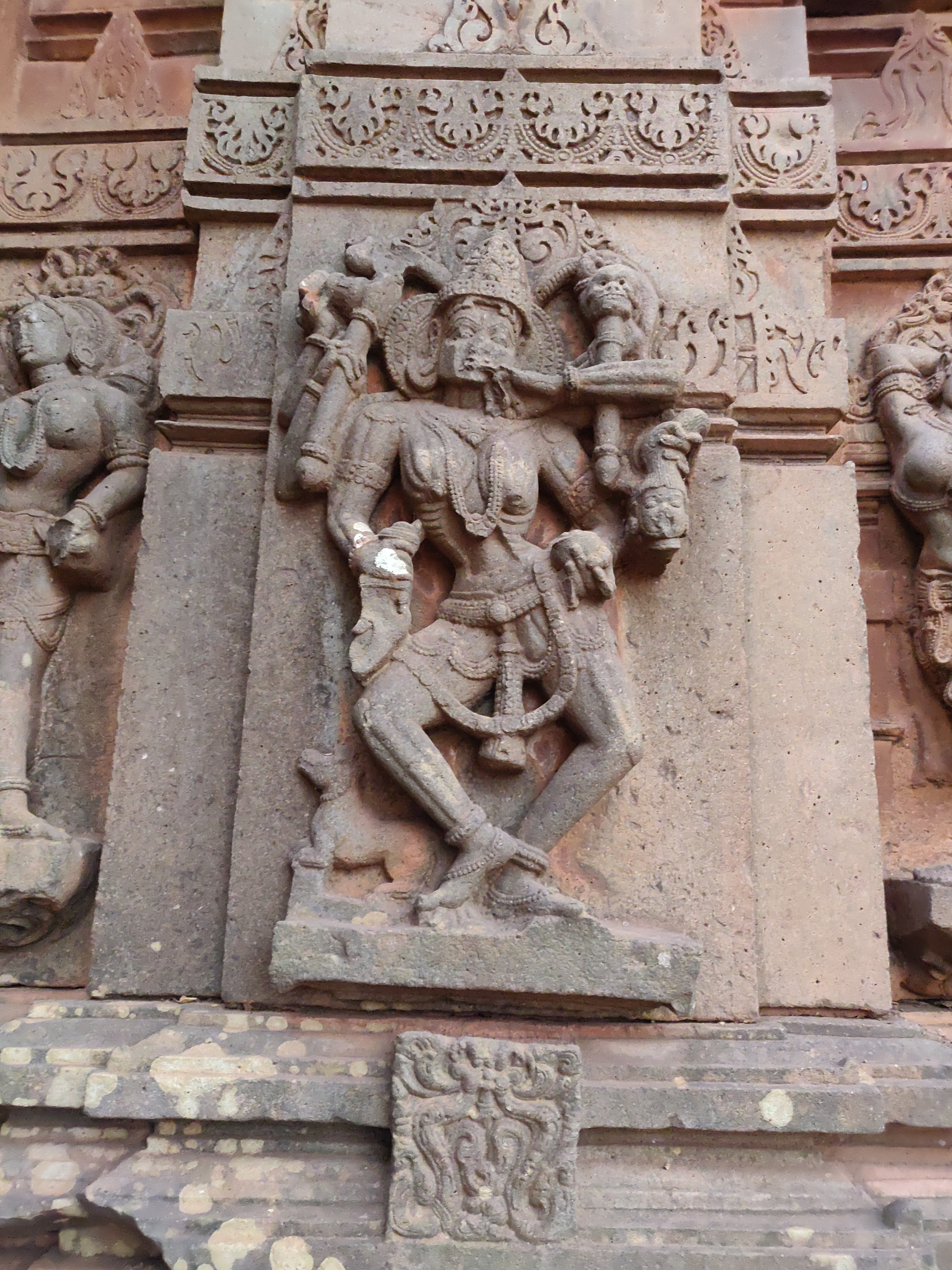
Salabhanjika style figures

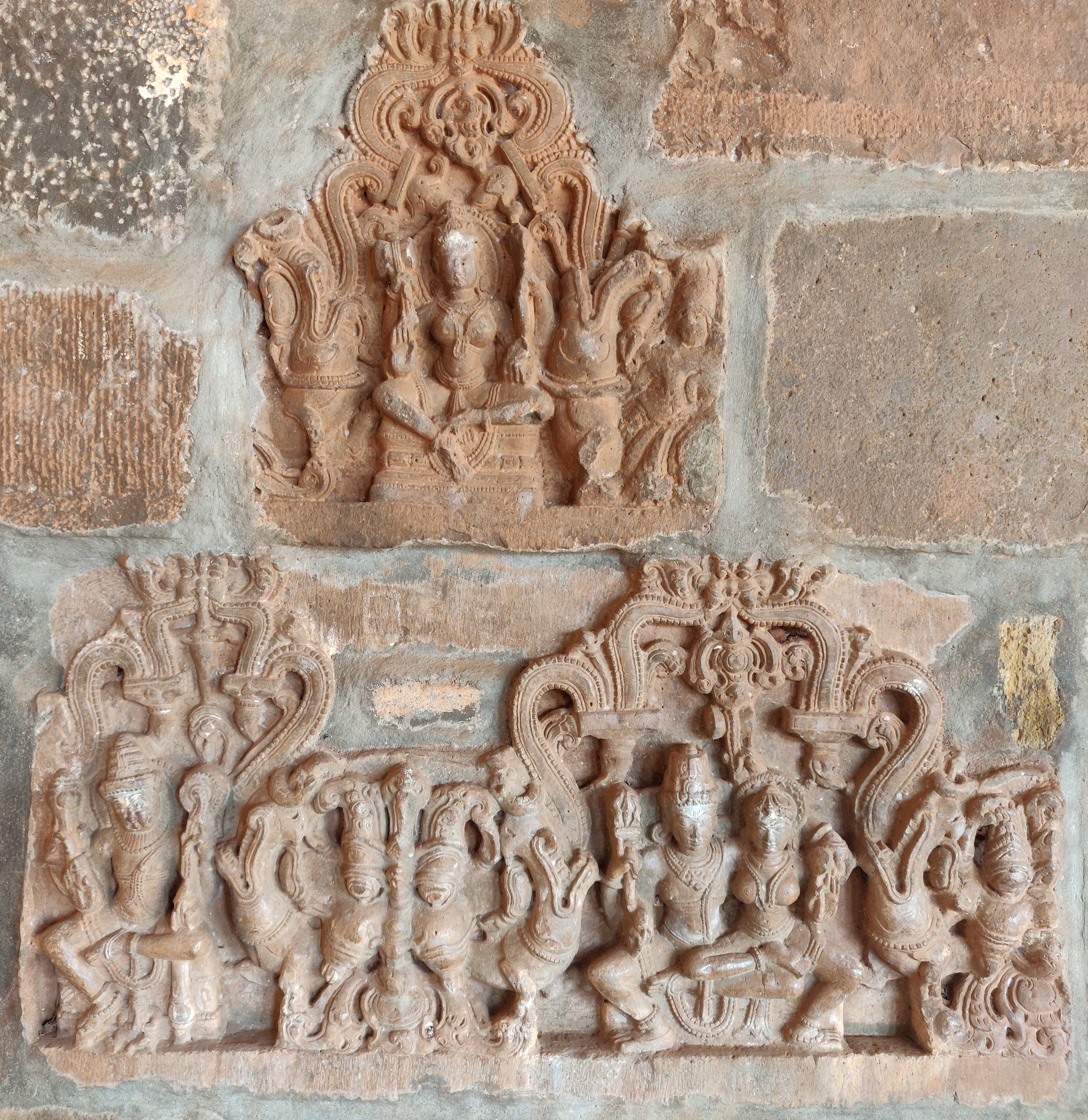
At the right side wall of the entrance

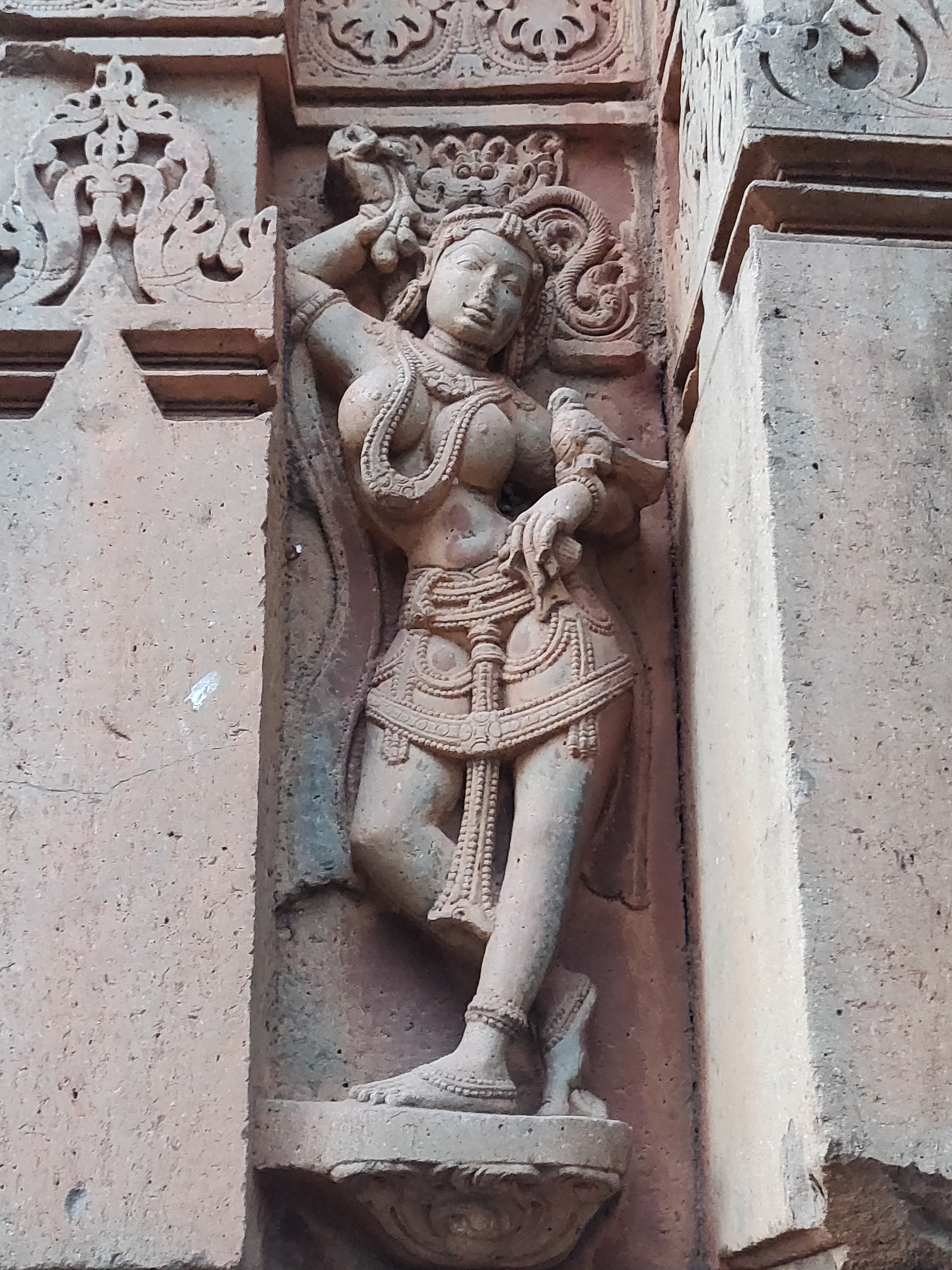
Salabhanjika style figures

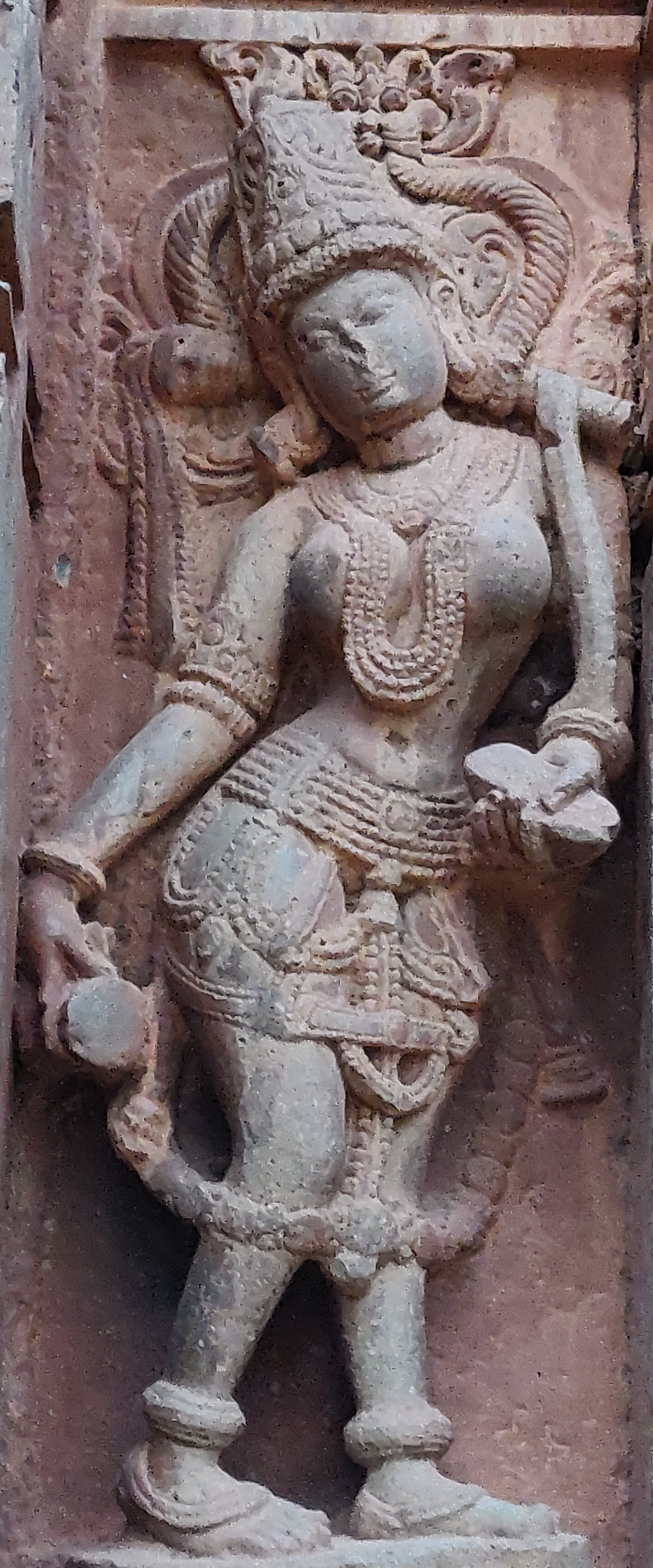
Salabhanjika style figures

== External sources ==
- Karnataka State Gazetteer, Bidar District, (Ed) K.Abhishankar; Bangalore, 1977. pp. 576–577.
