= Dubalgundi =

- large village
- Location in Karnataka, India Dubalgundi (India)
- Coordinates: 17.77°N 77.14°E
- Country: India
- State: Karnataka
- District: Bidar
- Talukas: Humnabad

Government
  - Body: Town Panchayat

Area
  - Total: 13 km^{2} (5.0 sq mi)
- Elevation: 626 m (2,054 ft)

Population (2011)
  - Total: 10,133
  - Density: 799/km^{2} (2,070/sq mi)

Languages
  - Official: Kannada
- Time zone: UTC+5:30 (IST)
- PIN: 585418
- Vehicle registration: KA-39

Dubalgundi is a large village( Hobli) in Humnabad taluka of Bidar district in the Indian state of Karnataka.It is 15km from Humnabad and 40km from Bidar district.

== Demographics ==
As of 2001 India census, Dubalgundi had a population of 9475 with 4852 males and 4623 females.

== See also ==
- Bidar
- Districts of Karnataka
