= Hudgi =

- village
- Location in Karnataka, India Hudgi (India)
- Coordinates: 17.77°N 77.14°E
- Country: India
- State: Karnataka
- District: Bidar
- Talukas: Homnabad

Population (2001)
  - Total: 9,000

Languages
  - Official: Kannada
- Time zone: UTC+5:30 (IST)

Hudgi is a village in the northern Karnataka, India. It is located in the Homnabad taluk of Bidar district.

== Demographics ==
As of 2001 India census, Hudgi had a population of 9000 with 4580 males and 4420 females.

== See also ==
- Bidar
- Districts of Karnataka
