= Salabhanjika =

Term in Indian art and literature

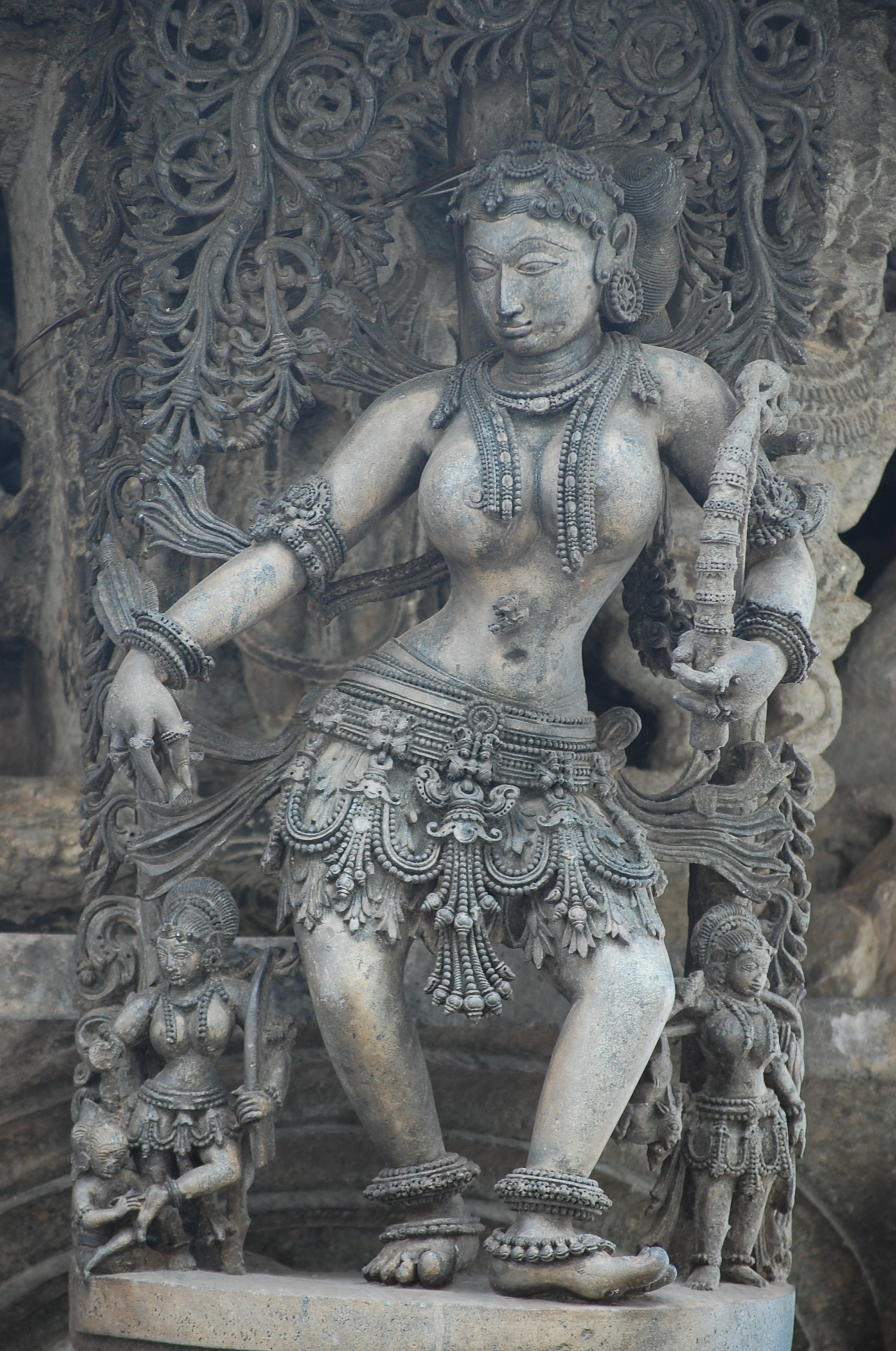
Salabhanjika, Hoysala era sculpture, Belur, Karnataka, India

A salabhanjika or shalabhanjika is a term found in Indian art and literature with a variety of meanings. In Buddhist art, it means an image of a woman or yakshi next to, often holding, a tree, or a reference to Maya under the sala tree giving birth to Siddhartha (Buddha). In Hindu and Jain art, the meaning is less specific, and it is any statue or statuette, usually female, that breaks the monotony of a plain wall or space and thus enlivens it.

In Buddhist literature, salabhanjika also refers to an ancient Indian festival, one celebrated when sala tree blossoms in the context of Buddha's life.

In literature, apart from the statue meaning, Salabhanjika can mean a doll, or fairy, or a seductress (harlot) depending on the context. In these contexts, they are also known as madanakai, madanika or shilabalika. In the context of Indian poetry and music, the term salabhanjika is synonymous with the pathyā meter – one of the minor chanda (poetic meter) in the catuṣpadi group, and is used for transition. The shalabhanjika is a common decorative element and Indian sculpture found inside and outside religious and secular spaces of Buddhist, Hindu and Jain architecture.

In Buddhist sites, reliefs on stupas displayed a stylized female by a tree, typically grasping or breaking a branch as Buddha's mother Maya did. In these contexts, salabhanjika may be related to ancient tree deities in Indian popular religion, related to fertility.

== Related iconography ==
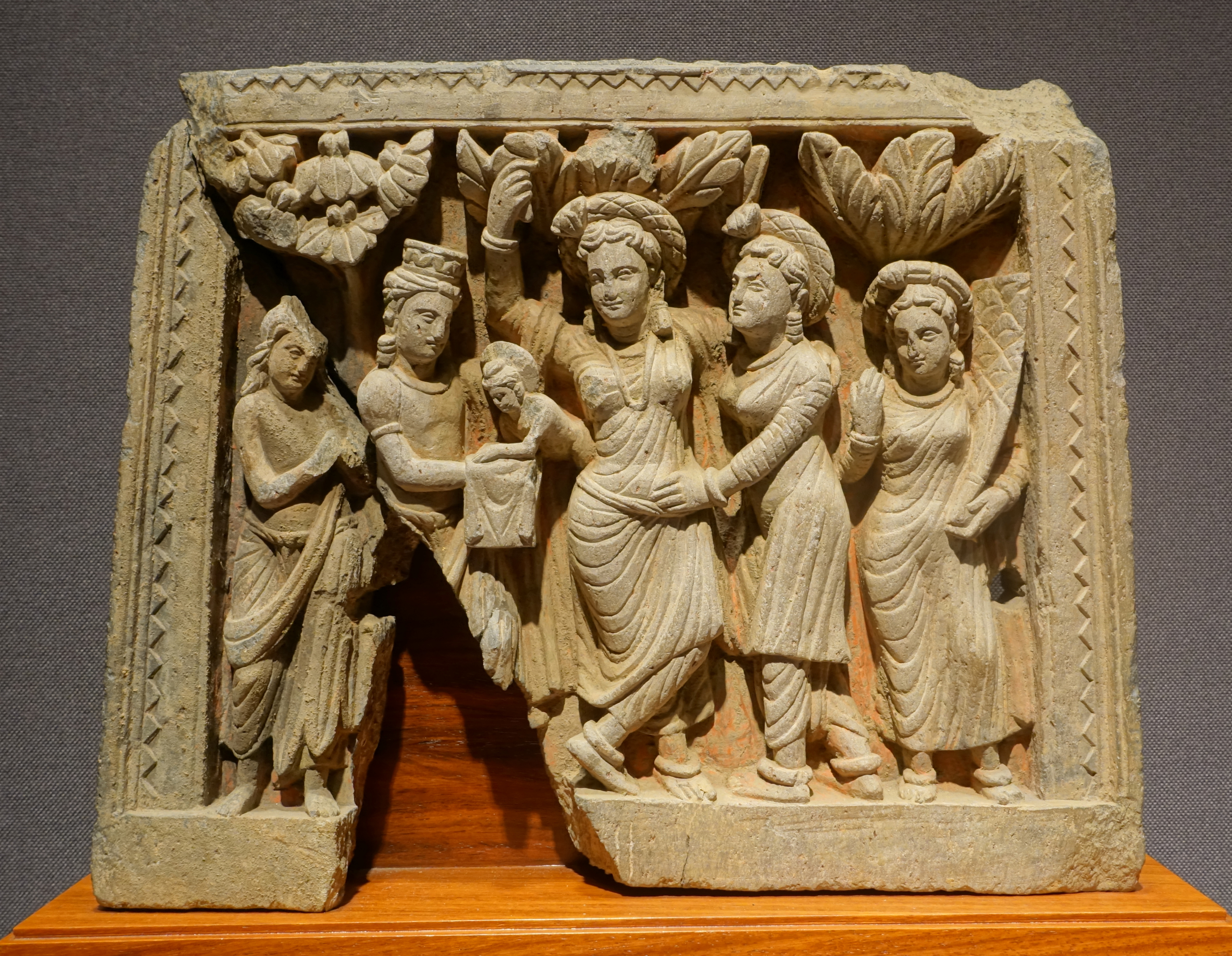
Birth of the Buddha, Gandhara, Kushan dynasty, 200s AD

The sal tree (Shorea robusta) is often confused with the ashoka tree (Saraca indica) in the ancient literature of the Indian subcontinent. The pose of the Salabhanjika is also very similar to that almost invariably given in art to Queen Maya when she gave birth to Gautama Buddha under an asoka tree in a garden in Lumbini, while grasping a branch over her head with one hand.

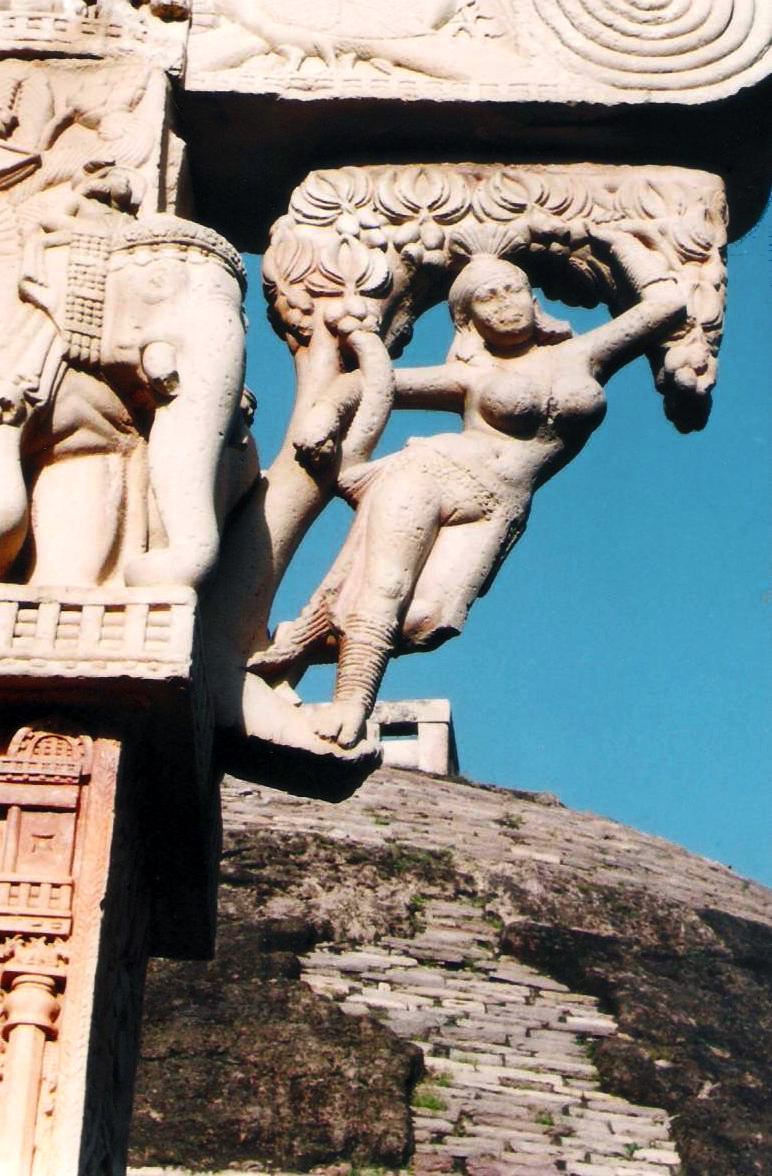
Shalabhanjika on Eastern Torana (gateway) under a tree, at the Buddhist Sanchi Stupa site

== Etymology ==
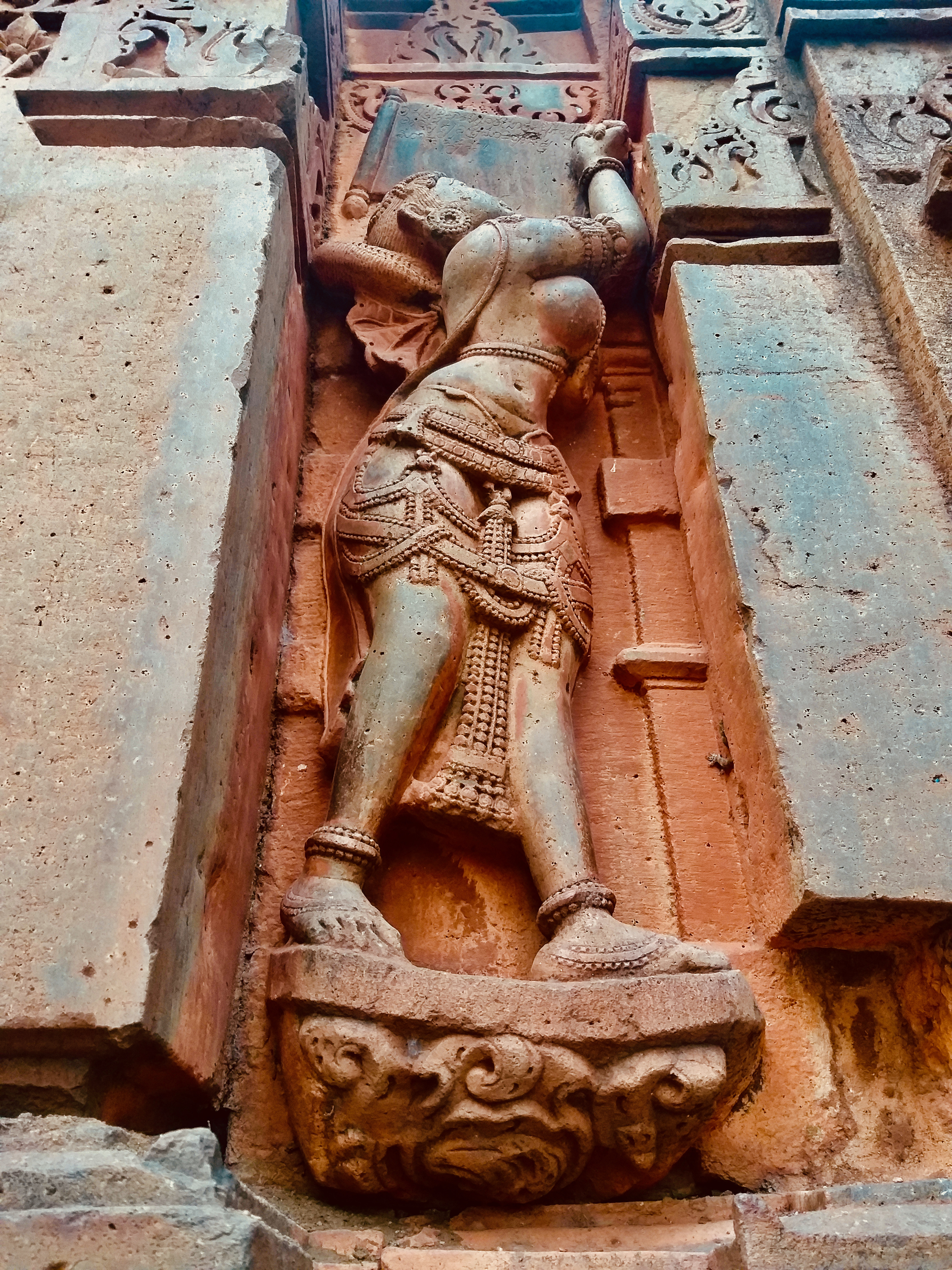
Built about 1100 CE, the Iswara Hindu temple in Jalasangvi Karnataka features many salabhanjikas, none with any tree. Among these is a woman writing a Sanskrit inscription in Kannada script on a slab.

The word śālabhañjikā is a compound Sanskrit word consisting of śālā and bhañjikā. The word bhañjikā means 'breaking, interrupting". The word śālā means any "house, space, enclosure, wall, court" – such as in dharmaśālā (rest house) or gośālā (resting space for cows). The same word also refers to the sala tree, a valuable timber tree used to construct homes and other buildings. According to Vogel, a Sanskrit scholar, the different meanings of the word salabhanjika in the Indian traditions, may be linked to the respective significance of sala tree, the Buddhist tradition associating it with the birth of Buddha, while Hindu and Jain traditions using the same tree as timber for making statues and other objects of art.

Vogel states that the word salabhanjika is found neither in the Vedic literature nor in Pali literature and nor in the major Indian epics, but appears in Indian classical literature of early 1st-millennium CE such as Asvagosha's Buddhacarita (c. 100 CE). An older reference to the synonymous term salastri – woman shaped out of sala tree – is found in the Hindu text Natyashastra in verses 2.83–84. This may reflect that the literature followed the tradition and popularity of carving wooden statues. The term is also synonymous with terms madanika, putrilika, stambhaputri, stambhaputrika, and putrika. Prasanna Acharya – a Sanskrit scholar and the author of An Encyclopedia of Hindu Architecture, states that śālā and bhañjikā appear in verse 2.79 of the Natyashastra in the sense of "a wooden image".

The word salabhanjika appears with uddalakapushpa-bhanjika and asokapushpaprachayika as ancient games in early Hindu Sanskrit texts, says Sivaramamurti – an art historian and Sanskrit epigraphist. These games were played by girls who collected flowers from the Sala, Asoka and other trees, then arranged them in colorful patterns or decorated their hair with them. This cultural event inspired sculpture, states Sivaramamurti. He concurs with Vogel and states that over the centuries, the word salabhanjika came to mean "any statue and nothing more", irrespective of the presence or absence of tree, whether female or male, in architecture or literature.

Vogel, Acharya, and other scholars concur that in the arts and literature of the Hindus and Jains, the term salabhanjika has simply meant any statue on any pillar, wall, or in any hall.

== Locations ==
In the Buddhist traditions, among the renowned shalabhanjika sculptures with sal tree are found in Bharhut and at the gateways (Torana) of Sanchi Stupa near Bhopal, a World Heritage site. Near Patna, another early example of a shalabhanjika was excavated with the Buddhist Stupa and Durakhi Devi Temple remains at the Kumhrar archaeological site. It is attributed to the Shunga dynasty dating to the 2nd or 1st century BC. This may reflect the remains of the ancient city of Pataliputra.

In the Hindu traditions, among the renowned salabhanjika sculptures without sal tree are those at the 12th-century Hoysala temples of Belur, Halebidu and Somanathapura, in south-central Karnataka. Some of the salabhanjika in Hindu and Jain temples may include decorations of flower or vine motifs behind or to the side of the statue or relief.

Salabhanjikas have been found in many historic temples of India, Nepal, Cambodia, Vietnam and Indonesia. These include the Chalukya period temple in Jalasangvi in northeast Karnataka, many in tribhanga (S-shaped) pose. These early sculptures were the source of inspiration for the later Hoysala bracket-figures.

Salabhanjikas
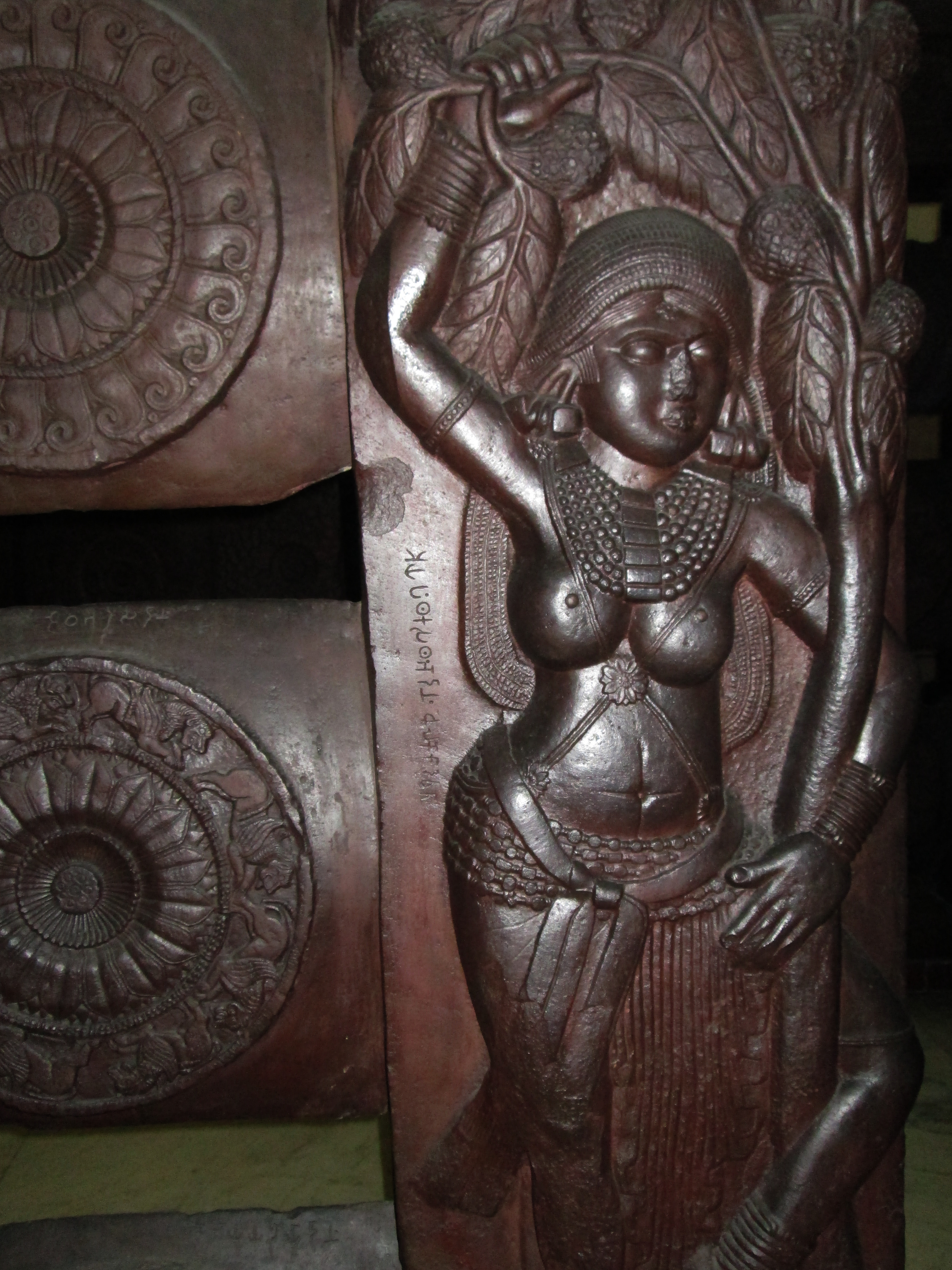
Buddhist, Bharhut, Madhya Pradesh

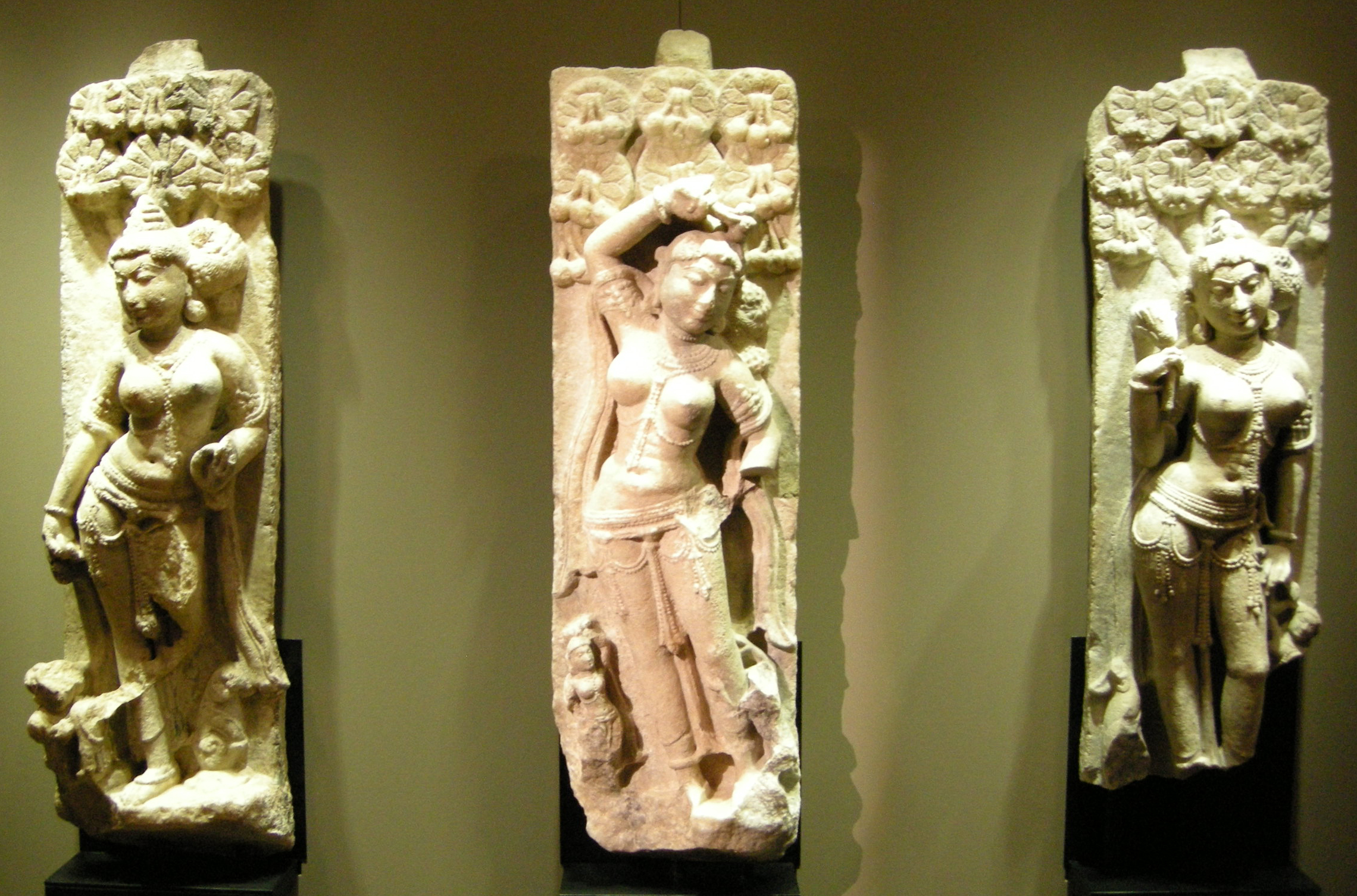
Buddhist, 11th-century north India, now at Museo d'Arte Orientale (Turin, Italy)

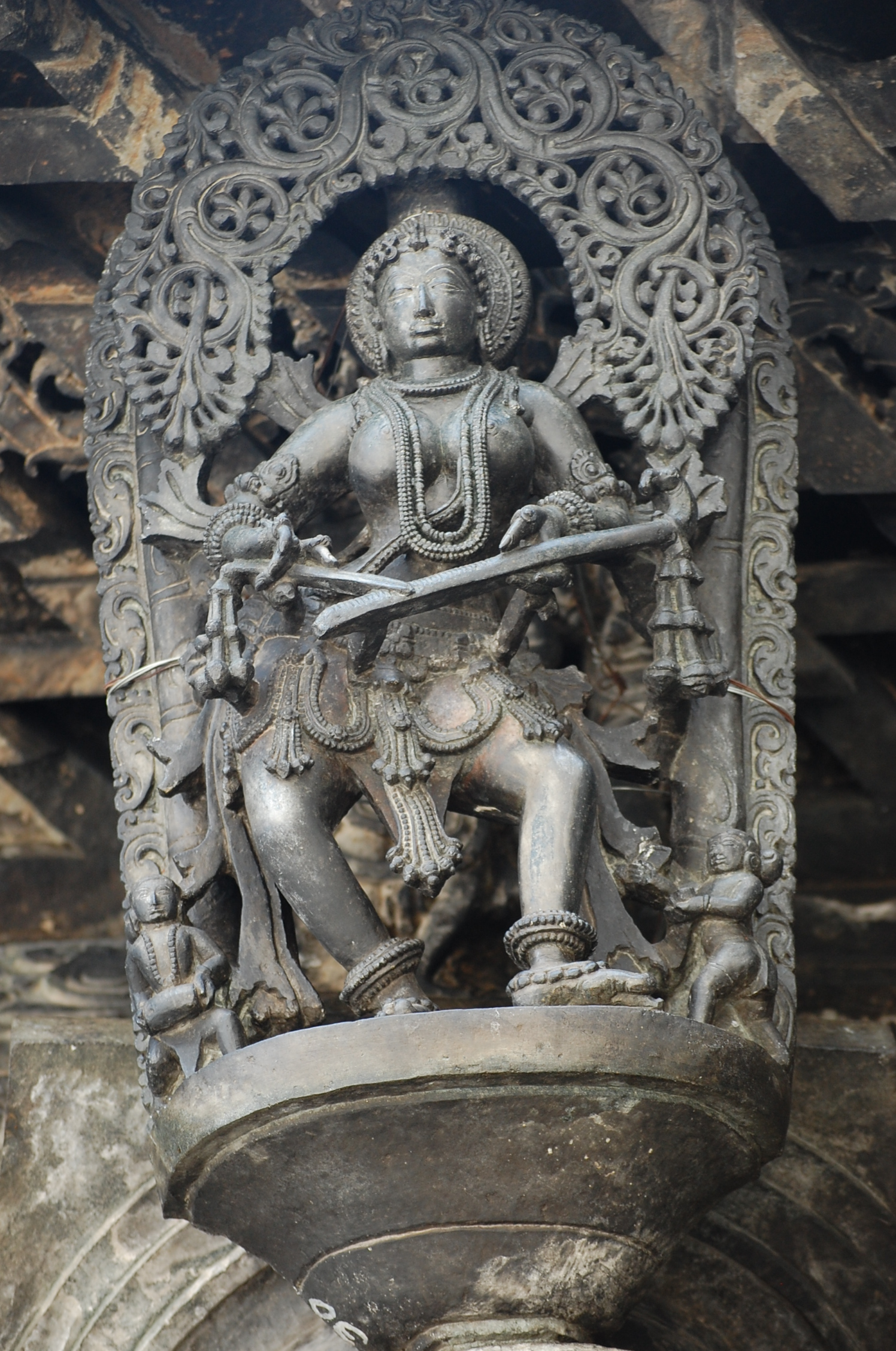
Hindu, Belur, Karnataka

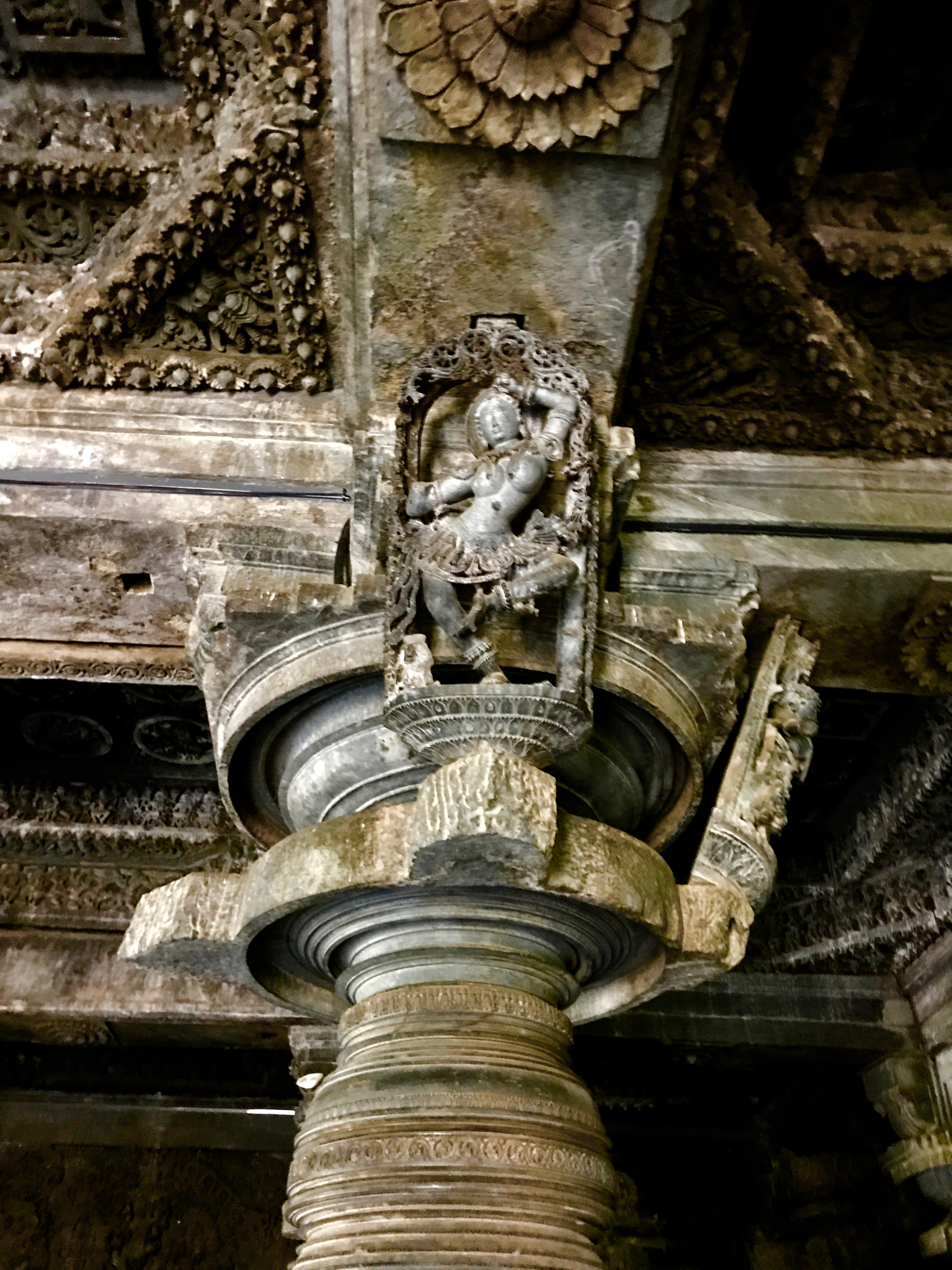
Hindu, Halebidu, Karnataka

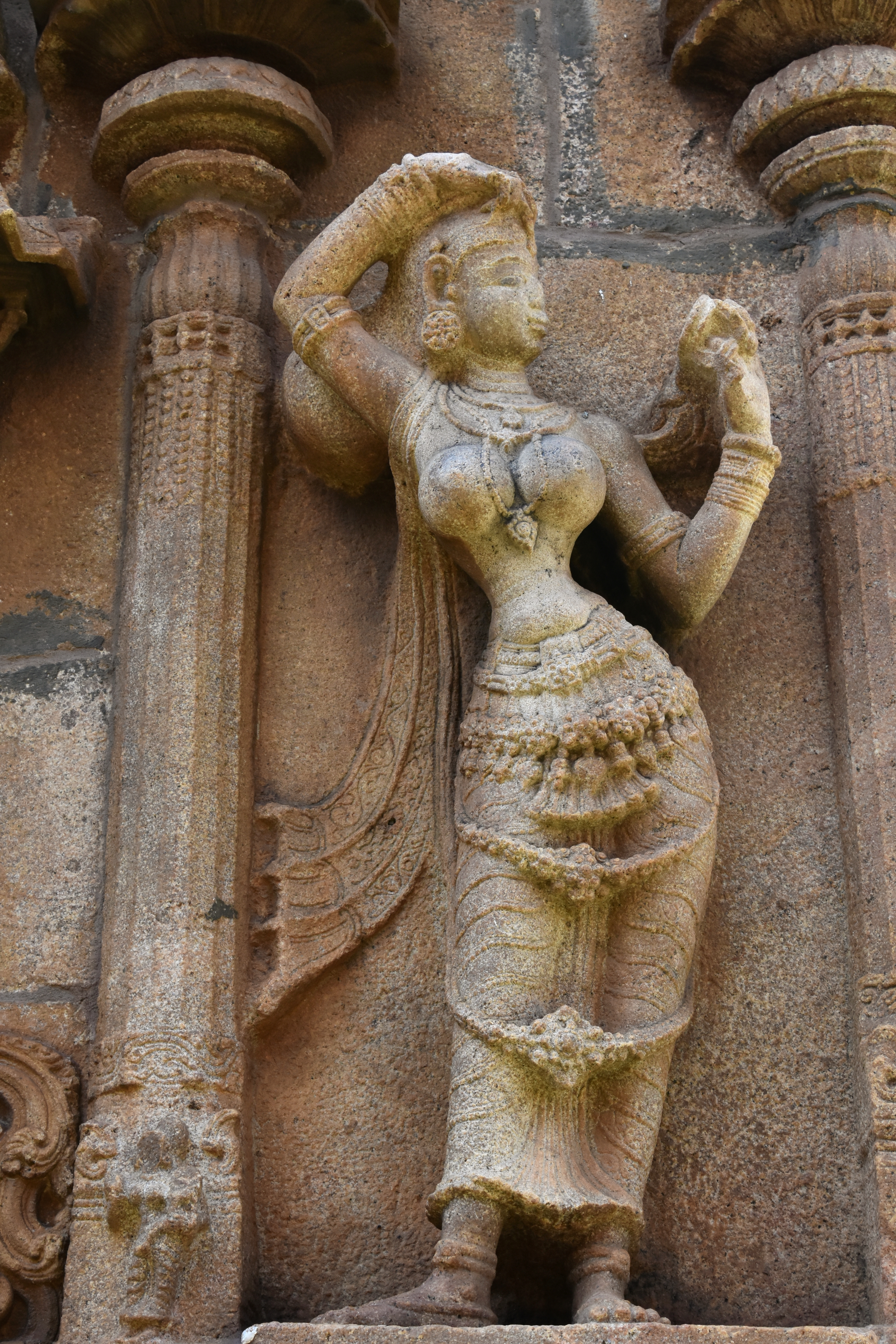
Hindu, Srirangam, Tamil Nadu

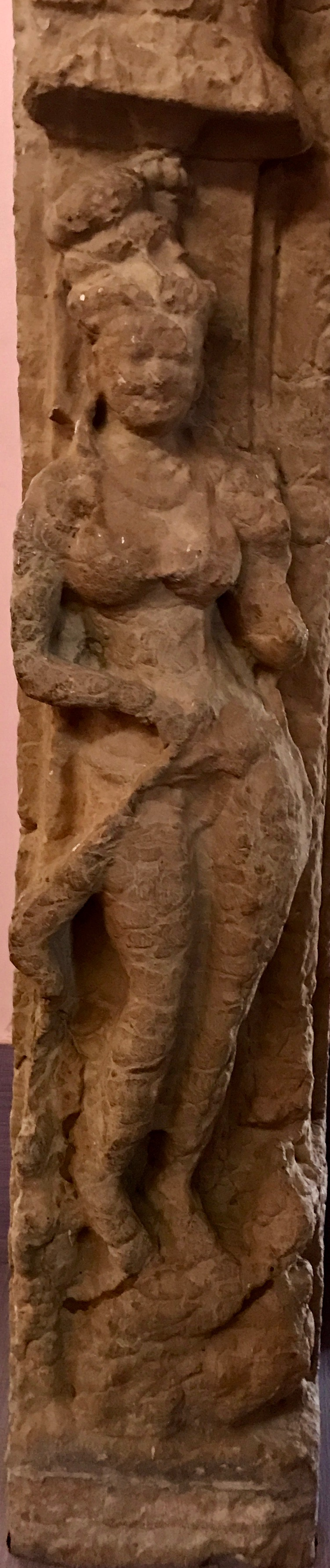
Hindu, Sirpur, Chhattisgarh

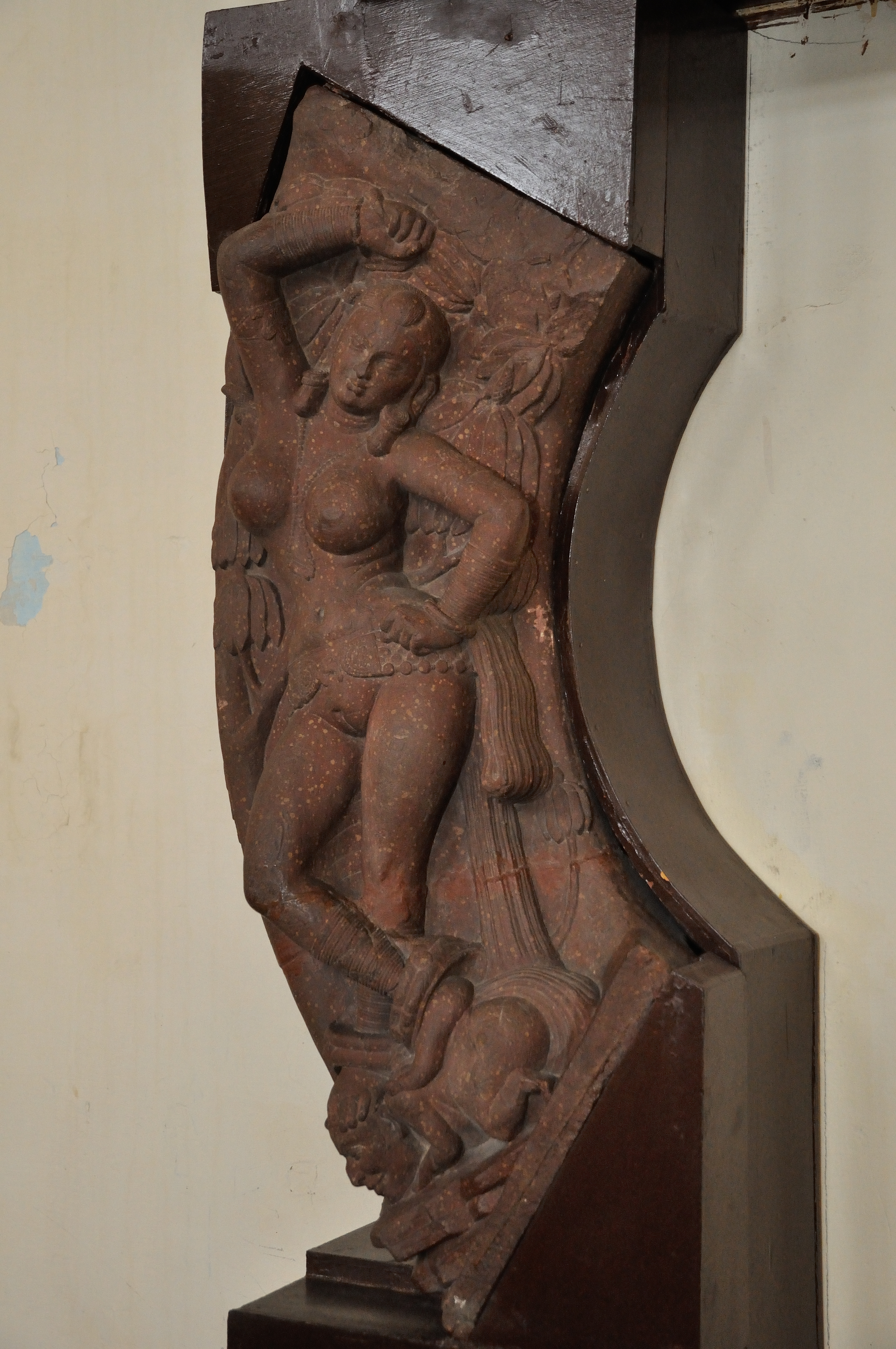
Hindu, Mathura, Uttar Pradesh

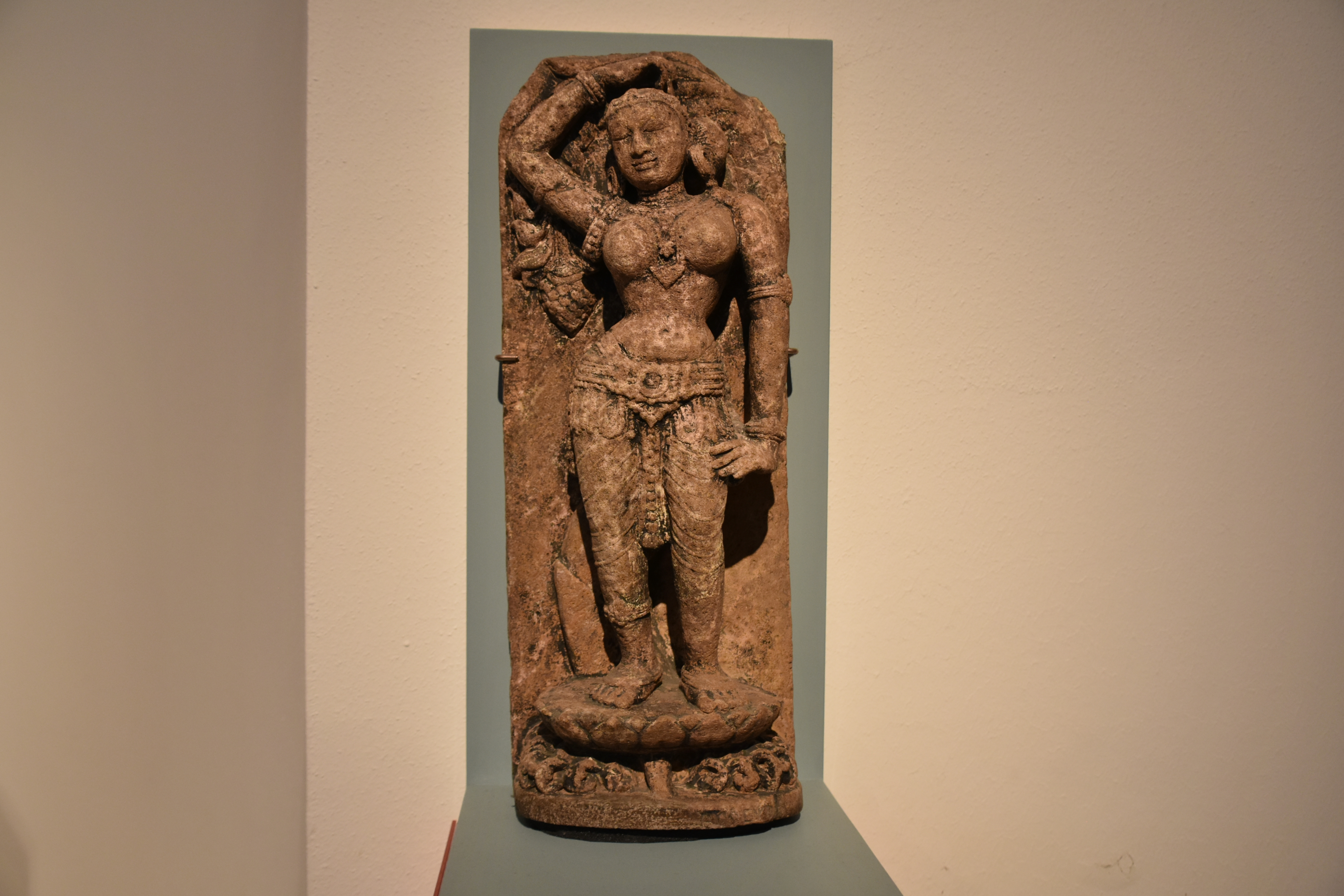
Hindu, 12th-century Odisha, now at Altes Museum, Berlin

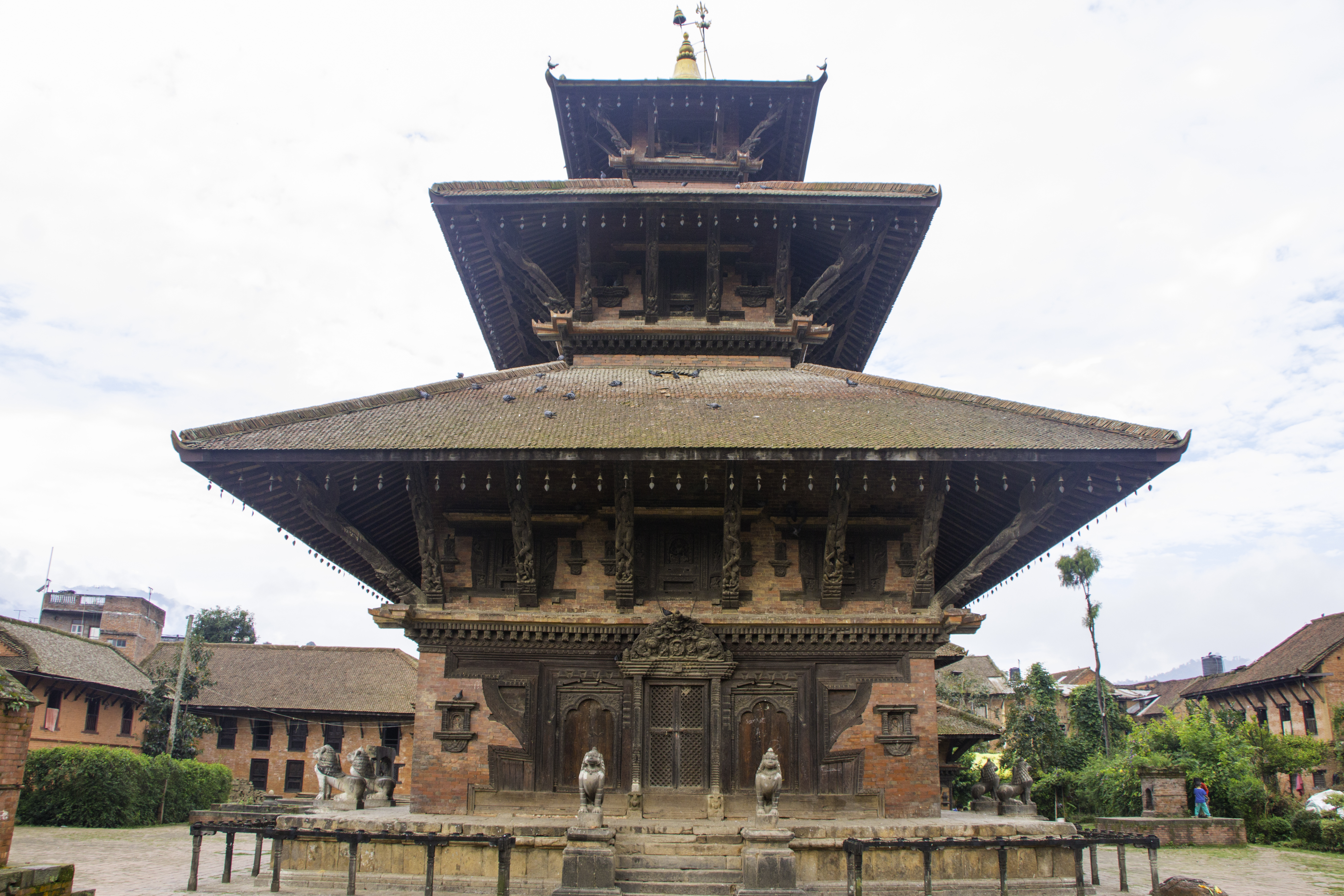
Hindu, Panauti Indreshwar Temple, Nepal

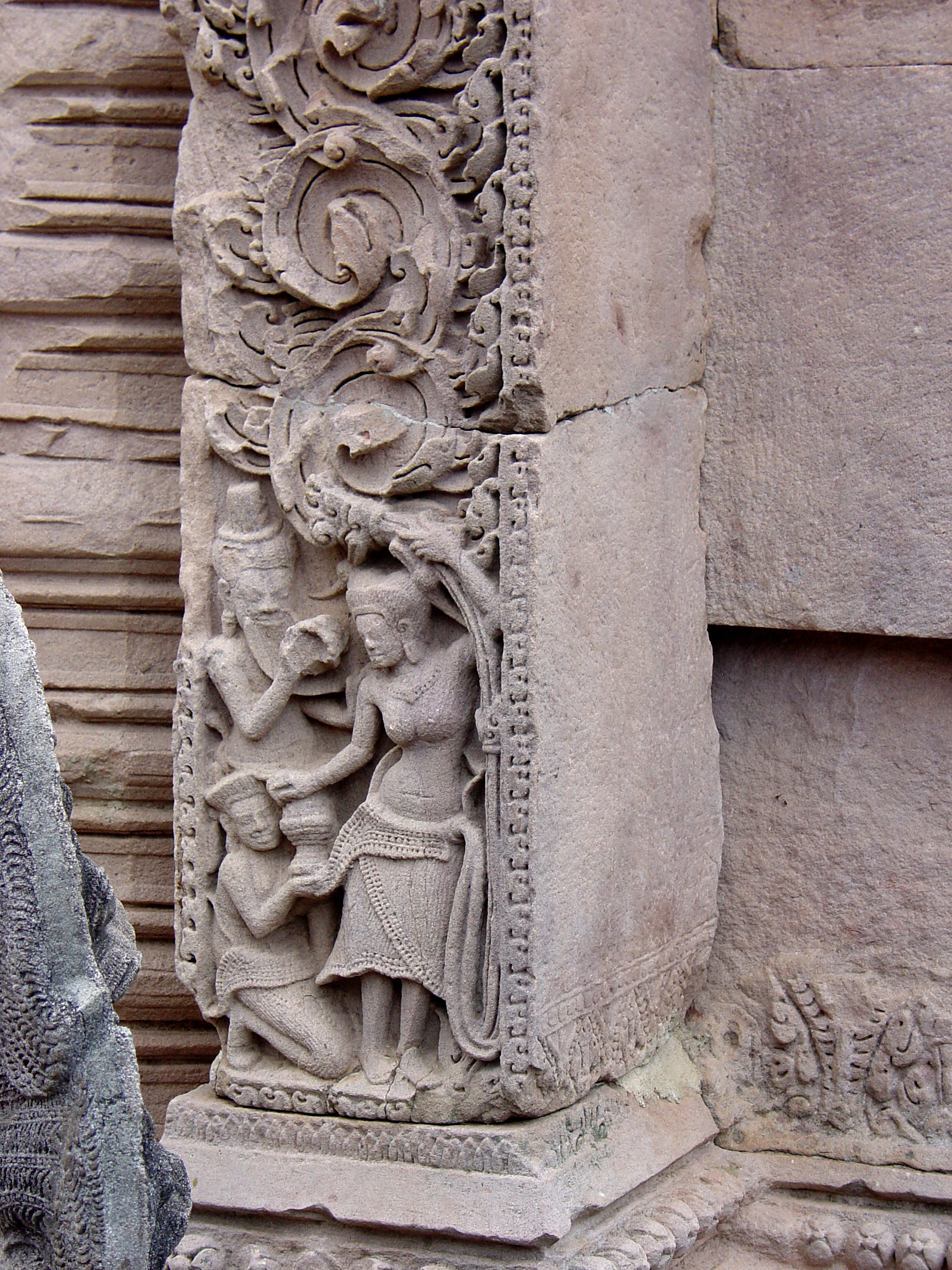
Hindu (with tree motif), Phanom Rung, Thailand

== See also ==
- Caryatid, a similar element in Western architecture
- List of tree deities
- Yakshini
