= List of State Protected Monuments in Karnataka Part II =

This is a list of State Protected Monuments, as officially reported by and available through the website of the Archaeological Survey of India in the Indian state Karnataka. The monument identifier is a combination of the abbreviation of the subdivision of the list (state, ASI circle) and the numbering as published on the website of the ASI. 747 State Protected Monuments have been recognized by the ASI in Karnataka. Subsequently location details for the monuments has been made available by the Department of Archeology Museums and Heritage of Government of Karnataka as a report which lists 844 Monuments. and a digital map.

The list for State Protected Monuments in Karnataka is long, so it has been split into two parts. Monuments No. S-KA-1 to S-KA-352 are in List of State Protected Monuments in Karnataka and Monuments S-KA-353 to S-KA-747 are in this part.

Besides the State Protected Monuments, also the Monuments of National Importance in this state might be relevant.

== List of state protected monuments ==
SL. No.	Description	Location	Address	District	Coordinates	Image
S-KA-353	Kirtinarayana temple	Hassan				Kirtinarayana temple
S-KA-354	Govindeshwara and Nageshwara temples	Hassan				Upload Photo
S-KA-355	Prasanna Channakeshava Temple and Image	Hassan				Upload Photo
S-KA-356	Vishnu temple	Hassan				Upload Photo
S-KA-357	Parsvanatha Basadi	Hassan				Upload Photo
S-KA-358	Chennakeshava Swami	Hassan				Chennakeshava Swami
S-KA-359	Yoganarasimha temple (Markali)	Hassan				Upload Photo
S-KA-360	Yoganarasimha Temple (Mudigere)	Hassan				Upload Photo
S-KA-361	Trikunteshwara temple	Hassan				Upload Photo
S-KA-362	Veerabhadra Temple	Hassan				Upload Photo
S-KA-363	Inscriptions	Hassan				Upload Photo
S-KA-364	Chatteshwara temple	Hassan				Upload Photo
S-KA-365	Keshava temple	Hassan				Upload Photo
S-KA-366	Someshwara temple	Hassan				Someshwara temple
S-KA-367	Narasimha temple	Hassan				Narasimha temple
S-KA-368	Chennakeshava temple	Hassan				Chennakeshava temple
S-KA-369	Mahalingeshwara temple	Hassan				Upload Photo
S-KA-370	Narasimha temple	Hassan				Narasimha temple
S-KA-371	Keshava temple	Hassan				Upload Photo
S-KA-372	Shanthinatha Basadi	Hassan				Shanthinatha Basadi
S-KA-373	Lakshminarayana temple	Hassan				Lakshminarayana temple
S-KA-374	Singeshwara temple	Hassan				Upload Photo
S-KA-375	Rameshwara temple	Hassan				Upload Photo
S-KA-376	Lakshmaneshwara temple	Hassan				Upload Photo
S-KA-377	Temples of Basappa and Somanatha with inscriptions	Haveri				Upload Photo
S-KA-378	Temples of Kalleshwara, Mahadeva with inscription and 2 other inscriptions	Haveri				Upload Photo
S-KA-379	Old temple of Sri Jakkanacharya	Haveri				Upload Photo
S-KA-380	Kalleshwara temple with inscriptions	Haveri				Upload Photo
S-KA-381	Fort	Haveri				Upload Photo
S-KA-382	Kallappa temple with Inscriptions	Haveri				Upload Photo
S-KA-383	Three Inscriptions in old Kannada	Haveri				Upload Photo
S-KA-384	Several temples and old inscriptions	Haveri				Upload Photo
S-KA-385	Temple of Kalleshwara with inscriptions	Haveri				Upload Photo
S-KA-386	Temple of Vishaparihareshwara and Basava with inscriptions	Haveri				Upload Photo
S-KA-387	Temple of Mailaradeva Mallikarjuna and 11 inscriptions	Haveri				Upload Photo
S-KA-388	Temple of Ramalinga with inscription; Virgal	Haveri				Upload Photo
S-KA-389	Temple of Dharvaraya with inscription	Haveri				Upload Photo
S-KA-390	Inscribed slab	Haveri				Upload Photo
S-KA-391	Three inscriptions	Haveri				Upload Photo
S-KA-392	Black stone temple of Gokuleshwara with carved walls and 5 inscriptions	Haveri				Upload Photo
S-KA-393	Kalmeshwara temple with 4 inscriptions	Haveri				Upload Photo
S-KA-394	Inscriptions	Haveri				Upload Photo
S-KA-395	Sangameshwara temple with inscriptions	Haveri				Upload Photo
S-KA-396	Rameshwara temple with inscription	Haveri				Upload Photo
S-KA-397	Hanuman temple, inscribed slab	Haveri				Upload Photo
S-KA-398	Four inscriptions outside Amritalinga temple	Haveri				Upload Photo
S-KA-399	Temple of Banashankari, Hanumanta, Someshwara with inscription; Virgals	Haveri				Upload Photo
S-KA-400	Temples of Chickeshwara; cave; two inscriptions	Haveri				Upload Photo
S-KA-401	Temple of Hanuman, Basavanna, Yellamma; inscription; copper plates	Haveri				Upload Photo
S-KA-402	Temples of Banashankari, Basavanna and Bhogeshwara, inscriptions	Haveri				Upload Photo
S-KA-403	Temples of Gargeshwara, Hanumantha with inscriptions	Haveri				Upload Photo
S-KA-404	Large carved ceiling panel showing the 8 regents of the points of compass	Haveri				Upload Photo
S-KA-405	Basaveshwara Temple with 2 inscriptions	Haveri				Upload Photo
S-KA-406	Temple of Mailara; Shrines to goddess Mallasanna and Mallaridevi	Haveri				Temple of Mailara; Shrines to goddess Mallasanna and Mallaridevi
S-KA-407	Inscriptions	Haveri				Upload Photo
S-KA-408	Chandrashekhara temple with 2 inscriptions	Haveri				Upload Photo
S-KA-409	Ranganatha temple with inscription	Haveri				Upload Photo
S-KA-410	Temples of Someshwara, Kaleshwara and Udehamma; inscriptions, copper plate	Haveri				Upload Photo
S-KA-411	Harihara temple with numerous inscriptions	Haveri				Upload Photo
S-KA-412	Inscribed tablet	Haveri				Upload Photo
S-KA-413	Hanuman temple with worn inscriptions	Haveri				Upload Photo
S-KA-414	Virgal dated 1206; Eshwara temple with inscriptions	Haveri				Upload Photo
S-KA-415	Temple of Siddeshwara Halevur Basavanna, Kalappa	Haveri				Upload Photo
S-KA-416	Kalappa temple with inscription	Haveri				Upload Photo
S-KA-417	Old temple with 3 inscriptions	Haveri				Upload Photo
S-KA-418	Basappa temple with Virgal bearing inscription	Haveri				Upload Photo
S-KA-419	Temple of Vishveshwara and Hanuman with inscriptions	Haveri				Upload Photo
S-KA-420	Old temple of Ganapathi and inscribed slab	Haveri				Upload Photo
S-KA-421	Temples of Durga, Totada Veerabhadra. Varah Kaleshwara, Vishaparihareshwara; 11 inscriptions	Haveri				Upload Photo
S-KA-422	Inscriptions in the field of Badgunds	Haveri				Upload Photo
S-KA-423	Sangama Basaveshwara temple with inscriptions	Haveri				Upload Photo
S-KA-424	Kalappa temple with inscription	Haveri				Upload Photo
S-KA-425	Some temples with many inscriptions	Haveri				Upload Photo
S-KA-426	Mallappa temple with 2 inscriptions	Haveri				Upload Photo
S-KA-427	Two temples of Rameshwara with inscriptions	Haveri				Upload Photo
S-KA-428	Eshwara temple with inscription, 3 inscriptions in village	Haveri				Upload Photo
S-KA-429	Broken inscriptions	Haveri				Upload Photo
S-KA-430	Hanuman temple with two inscriptions	Haveri				Upload Photo
S-KA-431	Kalleshwara temple with inscription; Sati stone	Haveri				Upload Photo
S-KA-432	Temple of Maruti Kantesha with inscription	Haveri				Upload Photo
S-KA-433	Temples of Bhimeshwara and Ganappa with Viragal and inscription respectively	Haveri				Upload Photo
S-KA-434	Temple inscription	Haveri				Upload Photo
S-KA-435	Temples of Adikeshava, Kalahasteshwara, Lakshminarasimha, Sangameshwara, Someshwara, Veerabhadra; inscriptions	Haveri				Upload Photo
S-KA-436	Tomb of Muslim saint with inscription	Haveri				Upload Photo
S-KA-437	Lingayat temple of Basaveshwara, Temples of Lakshmi, Saraswati, Someshwara	Haveri				Upload Photo
S-KA-438	Inscriptions	Haveri				Upload Photo
S-KA-439	Kanvi Siddeshwara temple with inscriptions	Haveri				Upload Photo
S-KA-440	Kannappa temple with 2 inscriptions	Haveri				Upload Photo
S-KA-441	Old temples of Parameshwara and Bhogesh; 3 inscriptions in villages	Haveri				Upload Photo
S-KA-442	Stone temple, Jakkanacharya style	Haveri				Upload Photo
S-KA-443	Narayana temple with inscriptions; inscribed stone with Brahmadeva image	Haveri				Upload Photo
S-KA-444	Hanuman temple	Haveri				Upload Photo
S-KA-445	Hanuman temple with old Kannada inscription	Haveri				Upload Photo
S-KA-446	Temples of Bayala Basappa and Siddarameshwara with inscriptions	Haveri				Upload Photo
S-KA-447	Basavanna temple	Haveri				Upload Photo
S-KA-448	Sangameshwara temple with inscriptions	Haveri				Upload Photo
S-KA-449	Basappa temple with inscription	Haveri				Upload Photo
S-KA-450	Inscriptions; Virgal	Haveri				Upload Photo
S-KA-451	Large artificial tank	Haveri				Upload Photo
S-KA-452	Inscribed pillar called Guruda gamba	Haveri				Upload Photo
S-KA-453	Kalleshwara temple with inscription	Haveri				Upload Photo
S-KA-454	Stone temple of Jakkanacharya style	Haveri				Upload Photo
S-KA-455	Inscription dated 1165	Haveri				Upload Photo
S-KA-456	Three inscriptions	Haveri				Upload Photo
S-KA-457	Vishwanatha Temple	Haveri				Upload Photo
S-KA-458	Ramadeva temple	Haveri				Upload Photo
S-KA-459	Temples of Billeshwara and Basappa with hero-stone and inscriptions respectively	Haveri				Upload Photo
S-KA-460	Unique megalithic structure of rough unhewn stones	Haveri				Upload Photo
S-KA-461	Brahma temple with Virgal and inscriptions	Haveri				Upload Photo
S-KA-462	Inscription in Kalleshwara temple	Haveri				Upload Photo
S-KA-463	Three inscriptions	Haveri				Upload Photo
S-KA-464	Shiva temple with virgal and inscriptions	Haveri				Upload Photo
S-KA-465	Inscriptions	Haveri				Upload Photo
S-KA-466	Inscription dated 1120	Haveri				Upload Photo
S-KA-467	Naryanadeva temple; 5 inscribed stones	Haveri				Upload Photo
S-KA-468	Kaleshwara temple, 15 carved stones	Haveri				Upload Photo
S-KA-469	Two inscriptions dated 1109 and 1110	Haveri				Upload Photo
S-KA-470	Inscriptions near Ramalinga temple	Haveri				Upload Photo
S-KA-471	Siddeshwara temple, Tomb of Muslim saint	Haveri				Upload Photo
S-KA-472	Eshwara temple	Haveri				Upload Photo
S-KA-473	Inscriptions	Haveri				Upload Photo
S-KA-474	Eshwara temple	Haveri				Upload Photo
S-KA-475	Inscription in Kaleshwara temple	Haveri				Upload Photo
S-KA-476	Temples of Ramlingadeva, Basavadeva, Shantideva	Haveri				Upload Photo
S-KA-477	Temples of Kalmeshwara and Basappa 10 Inscriptions	Haveri				Upload Photo
S-KA-478	Eshwaradeva temple	Haveri				Upload Photo
S-KA-479	Temples of Kalleshwara and Eshwara with Virgal and inscription respectively	Haveri				Upload Photo
S-KA-480	Inscribed stone; Sati Stone	Haveri				Upload Photo
S-KA-481	Four inscription slabs	Haveri				Upload Photo
S-KA-482	Santeshwara temple	Haveri				Upload Photo
S-KA-483	Kalleshwara Temple with old Kannada Inscription slab	Haveri				Upload Photo
S-KA-484	Inscriptions	Haveri				Upload Photo
S-KA-485	Inscribed stone.	Haveri				Upload Photo
S-KA-486	Eshwara temple with inscription	Haveri				Upload Photo
S-KA-487	Kalleshvara temple with Virgal and Inscriptions	Haveri				Upload Photo
S-KA-488	Rameshwara temple with carvings; Jaina temple inscriptions	Haveri				Upload Photo
S-KA-489	Inscriptions and viragals	Haveri				Upload Photo
S-KA-490	Dyamavva temple	Haveri				Upload Photo
S-KA-491	Kallaoppa temple with Inscriptions	Haveri				Upload Photo
S-KA-492	Ramalinga temple	Haveri				Upload Photo
S-KA-493	Raja's Tombs	Kodagu				Raja's Tombs More images
S-KA-494	Nalakanadu Palace	Kodagu				Nalakanadu Palace
S-KA-495	Bara Iman Makhan	Kolar				Upload Photo
S-KA-496	Sripathishwara temple	Kolar				Upload Photo
S-KA-497	Markandeshwara temple	Kolar				Upload Photo
S-KA-498	Eshwara temple	Kolar				Eshwara temple
S-KA-499	Ranganatha Temple	Kolar				Upload Photo
S-KA-500	Swayambhuveshwara Temple	Kolar				Upload Photo
S-KA-501	Vijayendra temple	Kolar				Vijayendra temple
S-KA-502	Venkataramanaswami temple	Kolar				Upload Photo
S-KA-503	Bhimeshwara and Nakuleshwara temples	Kolar				Upload Photo
S-KA-504	Someshwara Temple and Inscriptions	Kolar				Someshwara Temple and Inscriptions
S-KA-505	Vinayaka temple	Kolar				Upload Photo
S-KA-506	Vittalanarayana Temple	Kolar				Upload Photo
S-KA-507	Someshwara temple, Sripadaraya's Brindavana	Kolar				Someshwara temple, Sripadaraya's Brindavana
S-KA-508	Hydar Ali Dargah	Kolar				Hydar Ali Dargah
S-KA-509	Hussain Shah Dargah	Kolar				Upload Photo
S-KA-510	Garudashayana Big Garudashayana Small Agnistomas, Huge rock Thope well, Brindavan, Adjacent to Thope well, Brindavan, Adjacent to Thope well Garabhavi. Mantapa towards western side of Garabhavi Anjaneyaswamy temple	Kolar				Upload Photo
S-KA-511	Venkateshwara Govindaraja temple	Koppal				Upload Photo
S-KA-512	Mahadeva temple	Koppal				Upload Photo
S-KA-513	Someshwara Gurudeshwara temple	Koppal				Upload Photo
S-KA-514	Chandralinga temple	Koppal				Upload Photo
S-KA-515	Fort	Koppal				Fort
S-KA-516	Mahadeva(Rameshwara) temple	Koppal				Upload Photo
S-KA-517	Someshwara Temple (Pura)	Koppal				Upload Photo
S-KA-518	Someshwara Temple (Puratgeri)	Koppal				Upload Photo
S-KA-519	Somanath Temple	Koppal				Upload Photo
S-KA-520	Mosque	Koppal				Upload Photo
S-KA-521	Avenues	Koppal				Upload Photo
S-KA-522	Pre-historic site	Koppal				Upload Photo
S-KA-523	Bahadurbanda Fort	Koppal				Upload Photo
S-KA-524	Koppal Fort	Koppal				Koppal Fort
S-KA-525	Hindu Temple and Inscriptions	Koppal				Upload Photo
S-KA-526	Pre-historic site	Koppal				Upload Photo
S-KA-527	Hindu Temple	Koppal				Upload Photo
S-KA-528	Fort	Koppal				Upload Photo
S-KA-529	Artefacts	Koppal				Upload Photo
S-KA-530	Pre-historic site (Agoli)	Koppal				Upload Photo
S-KA-531	Pre-historic site (Siddapura)	Koppal				Upload Photo
S-KA-532	An old Hindu temple	Koppal				Upload Photo
S-KA-533	Balaji's Temple	Koppal				Upload Photo
S-KA-534	Remains of Hindu temple and inscriptions	Koppal				Upload Photo
S-KA-535	Hindu Temple with Inscriptions	Koppal				Upload Photo
S-KA-536	Old Mosque	Koppal				Upload Photo
S-KA-537	Kanaka Chalani Temple and remains of other Hindu temples	Koppal				Upload Photo
S-KA-538	An old Hindu Temple (Sindur)	Koppal				Upload Photo
S-KA-539	An old Hindu Temple (Venkatagiri)	Koppal				Upload Photo
S-KA-540	Eshwara Temple	Koppal				Upload Photo
S-KA-541	Ananthapadmanabha Temple	Mandya				Upload Photo
S-KA-542	Kashi Vishveshwara Temple	Mandya				Upload Photo
S-KA-543	Brahmeshwara Temple	Mandya				Brahmeshwara Temple
S-KA-544	Mahalingeshwara Temple	Mandya				Mahalingeshwara Temple
S-KA-545	Malleshwara Temple	Mandya				Upload Photo
S-KA-546	Basaveshwara Temple	Mandya				Upload Photo
S-KA-547	Tippu's Inscriptions	Mandya				Tippu's Inscriptions
S-KA-548	Webb's Monument	Mandya				Upload Photo
S-KA-549	Place where Ramanujacharya held a controversy with the Jaina Gurus	Mandya				Upload Photo
S-KA-550	The Kalyani and Bhuvaneshwari Mantapa and the ancillary shrines	Mandya				Upload Photo
S-KA-551	Narasimhaswamy Temple	Mandya				Narasimhaswamy Temple
S-KA-552	Narayanaswamy Temple	Mandya				Narayanaswamy Temple
S-KA-553	Madhavaraya Temple	Mandya				Upload Photo
S-KA-554	MoolesingeshwaraTemple	Mandya				Upload Photo
S-KA-555	Krishnamurti's Bungalow	Mandya				Upload Photo
S-KA-556	Rayagopura	Mandya				Rayagopura
S-KA-557	Venugopalaswamy Temple	Mandya				Venugopalaswamy Temple
S-KA-558	Mummadi Krishnaraja Wodeyar Birth Place	Mandya				Mummadi Krishnaraja Wodeyar Birth Place More images
S-KA-559	Srirangapatna Fort, Smarakagalu, 17 SI. No. Maddinamane, Mirsaddiq Palace, Thugu Bridge, Thuppada Kola, Koteya Suthalu Eruva Kandakagalu −2 Ranagambha	Mandya				Srirangapatna Fort, Smarakagalu, 17 SI. No. Maddinamane, Mirsaddiq Palace, Thugu Bridge, Thuppada Kola, Koteya Suthalu Eruva Kandakagalu −2 Ranagambha
S-KA-560	Kodandaramaswamy Temple	Mandya				Upload Photo
S-KA-561	Shwetavarahaswamy Temple	Mysore				Shwetavarahaswamy Temple More images
S-KA-562	Lakshmiramana Temple	Mysore				Lakshmiramana Temple
S-KA-563	Trinayaneshwaraswamy Temple	Mysore				Trinayaneshwaraswamy Temple
S-KA-564	Prasanna Krishnaswamy Temple	Mysore				Prasanna Krishnaswamy Temple
S-KA-565	Kodi Someshwara and Kodi Bhairaveshwara Temples	Mysore				Upload Photo
S-KA-566	Chamundeshwari Temple and Mahabaleshwara Temple on hill	Mysore				Chamundeshwari Temple and Mahabaleshwara Temple on hill More images
S-KA-567	Colossal Bull	Mysore				Colossal Bull
S-KA-568	Mahalingeshwara Temple	Mysore				Upload Photo
S-KA-569	Talakadu Temples	Mysore				Talakadu Temples
S-KA-570	Rameshwara Temple	Mysore				Upload Photo
S-KA-571	Varadaraja Temple	Mysore				Upload Photo
S-KA-572	Lakshmikanta Temple and adjoining Temples, Mantapas and Sandalwood door of Sati Shrine	Mysore				Upload Photo
S-KA-573	Someshwara Temple	Mysore				Upload Photo
S-KA-574	Narayana Temple	Mysore				Upload Photo
S-KA-575	Lakshmikanta Temple	Mysore				Lakshmikanta Temple
S-KA-576	Nageshwara Temple	Mysore				Upload Photo
S-KA-577	Ramanujacharya Temple	Mysore				Upload Photo
S-KA-578	Adinatha Basadi	Mysore				Upload Photo
S-KA-579	Arkeshwaraswamy Temple	Mysore				Arkeshwaraswamy Temple
S-KA-580	The Temples and the Gomateshwara figure at Gomateshwara Hill	Mysore				The Temples and the Gomateshwara figure at Gomateshwara Hill
S-KA-581	Keshava Temple	Mysore				Keshava Temple
S-KA-582	Agastheshwara Temple	Mysore				Upload Photo
S-KA-583	Hanumantheswara Temple	Mysore				Upload Photo
S-KA-584	Amrutheshwara Temple	Mysore				Upload Photo
S-KA-585	Wellington Lodge	Mysore				Wellington Lodge More images
S-KA-586	Gunjanarasimhaswamy Temple	Mysore				Gunjanarasimhaswamy Temple
S-KA-587	Yoganarasimhaswamy Temple	Mysore				Upload Photo
S-KA-588	Mulastaneshwara Temple	Mysore				Upload Photo
S-KA-589	Talakadu Maralu Dibbagalu	Mysore				Talakadu Maralu Dibbagalu
S-KA-590	Chennakeshava Temple	Mysore				Chennakeshava Temple
S-KA-591	Fort	Raichur				Fort
S-KA-592	Jain Sculptures and inscriptions	Raichur				Upload Photo
S-KA-593	Ek Minar Masjid	Raichur				Ek Minar Masjid
S-KA-594	Gateways of the Town: Maccal Darwaza, Naurangi Darwaza, Kati Darawaza etc.	Raichur				Upload Photo
S-KA-595	Pre-historic site	Raichur				Upload Photo
S-KA-596	Venkateshwara Temple with Devanagari inscription	Raichur				Upload Photo
S-KA-597	Fort	Raichur				Upload Photo
S-KA-598	Iron slag and artifacts	Raichur				Iron slag and artifacts
S-KA-599	Cairns	Raichur				Upload Photo
S-KA-600	Ash-mound	Raichur				Upload Photo
S-KA-601	Fort	Raichur				Upload Photo
S-KA-602	Neolithic implements	Raichur				Upload Photo
S-KA-603	Natural Cavern, artifacts, Iron slag and pieces of ancient pottery	Raichur				Upload Photo
S-KA-604	Avenues	Raichur				Upload Photo
S-KA-605	Stone Axes, Hammers, Flakes, Cores and Pottery.	Raichur				Upload Photo
S-KA-606	Hindu Temple	Raichur				Upload Photo
S-KA-607	Pygmy Flakes and Stone Celts	Raichur				Upload Photo
S-KA-608	Ash- Mounds, Gold Crushers, Chert and Agate Flakes	Raichur				Upload Photo
S-KA-609	Neolithic implements (Machnur)	Raichur				Upload Photo
S-KA-610	Neolithic Implements (Bellamarayanagudda)	Raichur				Upload Photo
S-KA-611	Artifacts	Raichur				Upload Photo
S-KA-612	Ash – mound and Chert flakes	Raichur				Upload Photo
S-KA-613	Remains of old smelting factories	Raichur				Upload Photo
S-KA-614	Ash-mound and Artifacts	Raichur				Upload Photo
S-KA-615	Hindu-Temple	Raichur				Hindu-Temple
S-KA-616	Venkateshwara Temple	Raichur				Upload Photo
S-KA-617	Mosque	Raichur				Upload Photo
S-KA-618	Jain Temple and Inscription	Raichur				Upload Photo
S-KA-619	Fort	Raichur				Upload Photo
S-KA-620	Neolithic implements	Raichur				Upload Photo
S-KA-621	Hindu Temples with Inscriptions	Raichur				Upload Photo
S-KA-622	Iron slag, Artifacts and old Crushers	Raichur				Upload Photo
S-KA-623	Neolithic Implements (Gorebal)	Raichur				Upload Photo
S-KA-624	Neolithic Implements (Anandagal)	Raichur				Neolithic Implements (Anandagal)
S-KA-625	Pre-historic Site (Manvi)	Raichur				Upload Photo
S-KA-626	Pre-historic Site (Haranahalli)	Raichur				Upload Photo
S-KA-627	Artifacts	Raichur				Upload Photo
S-KA-628	Iron slag, ancient pottery and Artifacts	Raichur				Upload Photo
S-KA-629	Natural Cavern and Artifacts	Raichur				Upload Photo
S-KA-630	Hindu Temple	Raichur				Upload Photo
S-KA-631	Ruined Temples and Inscriptions	Raichur				Upload Photo
S-KA-632	An Old Mosque with an Inscription in Persian	Raichur				Upload Photo
S-KA-633	Fort	Raichur				Upload Photo
S-KA-634	An old Mosque: Jami Masjid, Raichur	Raichur				An old Mosque: Jami Masjid, Raichur
S-KA-635	An old Hindu Temple and Inscriptions	Raichur				Upload Photo
S-KA-636	Fort	Raichur				Upload Photo
S-KA-637	Hindu Temple	Raichur				Upload Photo
S-KA-638	Fort	Raichur				Upload Photo
S-KA-639	Artifacts	Raichur				Upload Photo
S-KA-640	Bangara Basappa's Temple	Raichur				Upload Photo
S-KA-641	Vishveshwara Temple	Raichur				Upload Photo
S-KA-642	Hindu Temple	Raichur				Upload Photo
S-KA-643	Eshwara Temple, Ganjigudi mutt	Raichur				Upload Photo
S-KA-644	Venkateshwara Temple	Raichur				Upload Photo
S-KA-645	Chudi Gate Temple, Hanuman Temple, Temple near Jami Masjid	Raichur				Upload Photo
S-KA-646	Mel Shankara's Temple	Raichur				Upload Photo
S-KA-647	Neolithic Implements	Raichur				Upload Photo
S-KA-648	Flackes, Cores, etc.	Raichur				Upload Photo
S-KA-649	Neolithic Implements	Raichur				Upload Photo
S-KA-650	Artifacts	Raichur				Upload Photo
S-KA-651	Pre-historic Site	Raichur				Upload Photo
S-KA-652	Lakshmi Narayana Temple with the Inscriptions in it	Raichur				Upload Photo
S-KA-653	Lakshminarasimha Temple	Shimoga				Upload Photo
S-KA-654	Basadigalu	Shimoga				Upload Photo
S-KA-655	Jain Basadigalu	Shimoga				Upload Photo
S-KA-656	Temples and Inscriptions	Shimoga				Temples and Inscriptions
S-KA-657	Umapathi Temple	Shimoga				Upload Photo
S-KA-658	Shivappa Nayaka Palace	Shimoga				Shivappa Nayaka Palace
S-KA-659	Kote Anjaneyaswamy Temple	Shimoga				Kote Anjaneyaswamy Temple
S-KA-660	Bheemeshwara Swamy Temple	Shimoga				Bheemeshwara Swamy Temple
S-KA-661	Rameshwara Temple	Shimoga				Rameshwara Temple
S-KA-662	Varadarajaswamy Temple	Tumkur				Upload Photo
S-KA-663	Chennigaraya Temple	Tumkur				Upload Photo
S-KA-664	Gangadhareshwara Temple	Tumkur				Gangadhareshwara Temple
S-KA-665	Veerabhadra and Chokkanathswamy Temple	Tumkur				Upload Photo
S-KA-666	Viragals	Tumkur				Upload Photo
S-KA-667	Lakshminarasimha Temple	Tumkur				Lakshminarasimha Temple
S-KA-668	Ranganatha Temple	Tumkur				Upload Photo
S-KA-669	Malleshwara Temple (Huliyaru)	Tumkur				Upload Photo
S-KA-670	Malleshwara Temple (Madhugiri)	Tumkur				Upload Photo
S-KA-671	Venkataramana Temple	Tumkur				Upload Photo
S-KA-672	Malleshwara Temple	Tumkur				Upload Photo
S-KA-673	Venkataramana Temple	Tumkur				Upload Photo
S-KA-674	Kalleshwara Temple	Tumkur				Upload Photo
S-KA-675	Balalingeshwara Temple	Tumkur				Balalingeshwara Temple
S-KA-676	Narasimha Temple	Tumkur				Upload Photo
S-KA-677	Yoga- Mahadeva Temple	Tumkur				Yoga- Mahadeva Temple
S-KA-678	Nandi in front of the Gangadhareshwara Temple	Tumkur				Nandi in front of the Gangadhareshwara Temple
S-KA-679	Chennigaraya Temple	Tumkur				Upload Photo
S-KA-680	Shankareshwara Temple	Tumkur				Shankareshwara Temple
S-KA-681	Chennakeshava Temple	Tumkur				Chennakeshava Temple
S-KA-682	Kalleshwara Temple	Tumkur				Kalleshwara Temple
S-KA-683	Narasimha Temple	Tumkur				Narasimha Temple
S-KA-684	Padmeshwara Temple	Tumkur				Upload Photo
S-KA-685	Byatarayaswamy Temple	Tumkur				Byatarayaswamy Temple
S-KA-686	Jumma Masjid (Megalapete)	Tumkur				Upload Photo
S-KA-687	Malik Rahan Darga	Tumkur				Upload Photo
S-KA-688	Kumara Ramaswamy Temple	Tumkur				Upload Photo
S-KA-689	Suralu Palace	Udupi				Upload Photo
S-KA-690	Bana Teertha	Udupi				Upload Photo
S-KA-691	Gadha Teertha	Udupi				Upload Photo
S-KA-692	Parasu Teertha, Sri Krishna Temple with kanakana kindi.	Udupi				Parasu Teertha, Sri Krishna Temple with kanakana kindi. More images
S-KA-693	Dhanusha Teertha	Udupi				Upload Photo
S-KA-694	Hanumantha Gopura	Udupi				Upload Photo
S-KA-695	Pajaka Matha	Udupi				Upload Photo
S-KA-696	Birthplace of Sri Madhavacharya, Sri Anathapadmanabhaswamy Temple	Udupi				Upload Photo
S-KA-697	Nagabana	Udupi				Upload Photo
S-KA-698	Durga Temple	Udupi				Upload Photo
S-KA-699	Idols	Uttara Kannada				Upload Photo
S-KA-700	Temples of Rameshwara, Mahadeva and Ganapati	Uttara Kannada				Upload Photo
S-KA-701	Inscribed Stones	Uttara Kannada				Upload Photo
S-KA-702	Kaithabheshwara Temple with Inscriptions	Uttara Kannada				Upload Photo
S-KA-703	Fort Rudreshwara Temple	Uttara Kannada				Upload Photo
S-KA-704	Fortress	Uttara Kannada				Upload Photo
S-KA-705	Ship-shaped shrine of Kantradevi	Uttara Kannada				Upload Photo
S-KA-706	Lakshmidevi Temple	Uttara Kannada				Upload Photo
S-KA-707	Carved Stones	Uttara Kannada				Upload Photo
S-KA-708	Jain Temple of Parsvanatha with inscribed stone	Uttara Kannada				Upload Photo
S-KA-709	Sadashivagad, Savargad	Uttara Kannada				Upload Photo
S-KA-710	Mahadeva temple with 4 inscribed tablets	Uttara Kannada				Upload Photo
S-KA-711	Temples of Ganga, Kameshwara	Uttara Kannada				Upload Photo
S-KA-712	Temple of Mahabaleshwara several shrines and ponds	Uttara Kannada				Upload Photo
S-KA-713	Sacrificial Altars	Uttara Kannada				Upload Photo
S-KA-714	Temples	Uttara Kannada				Temples
S-KA-715	Ramatirtha and temple of Ramalinga, Basavarajadurga	Uttara Kannada				Upload Photo
S-KA-716	Rameshwara Temple	Uttara Kannada				Upload Photo
S-KA-717	Loose stone sculptures near Jaina Temple	Uttara Kannada				Upload Photo
S-KA-718	Old European graves	Uttara Kannada				Upload Photo
S-KA-719	Forty ponds, Temple of Kallamma	Uttara Kannada				Upload Photo
S-KA-720	Inscriptions	Uttara Kannada				Upload Photo
S-KA-721	Narasimha Temple	Uttara Kannada				Upload Photo
S-KA-722	Old and Small Temple	Uttara Kannada				Upload Photo
S-KA-723	Venkataramana Devasthana Muttinakere Shankaranarayana Devasthana	Uttara Kannada				Upload Photo
S-KA-724	Temple of Marikamba	Uttara Kannada				Upload Photo
S-KA-725	Fort: 2 Inscriptions, figure of Tiger	Uttara Kannada				Upload Photo
S-KA-726	Inscribed stones (Sadashivagad)	Uttara Kannada				Upload Photo
S-KA-727	Inscribed stones (Samvargad)	Uttara Kannada				Upload Photo
S-KA-728	Temple of Naganath	Uttara Kannada				Upload Photo
S-KA-729	Temple of Promontory called Kandugiri. 30 virgals and inscriptions	Uttara Kannada				Upload Photo
S-KA-730	Fort (Sadashivagad)	Uttara Kannada				Upload Photo
S-KA-731	Fort (Samvargad)	Uttara Kannada				Upload Photo
S-KA-732	Basaveshwara Idol at Shirve Hill	Uttara Kannada				Upload Photo
S-KA-733	Haider Ghat	Uttara Kannada				Upload Photo
S-KA-734	Fort	Uttara Kannada				Upload Photo
S-KA-735	Inscriptions	Uttara Kannada				Upload Photo
S-KA-736	Old forts, two stone walls	Uttara Kannada				Upload Photo
S-KA-737	Mahanti math, Gaddige math, Venkataramana Devasthana Hundehom for kings of Sedhar	Uttara Kannada				Upload Photo
S-KA-738	Inscribed stones	Uttara Kannada				Upload Photo
S-KA-739	Ramalinga Veerbhadradeva Temple with two inscriptions	Uttara Kannada				Upload Photo
S-KA-740	One big stone called Rama Khan	Uttara Kannada				Upload Photo
S-KA-741	Ramalinga Temple	Uttara Kannada				Upload Photo
S-KA-742	Banaveshwara temple	Uttara Kannada				Upload Photo
S-KA-743	Inscribed stones	Uttara Kannada				Upload Photo
S-KA-744	Shrines of Mahadeva and Parvati, Cave with Bronze female figure	Uttara Kannada				Upload Photo
S-KA-745	Durga Temple	Uttara Kannada				Upload Photo
S-KA-746	Dharesvar: Dharanath Temple	Uttara Kannada				Upload Photo
S-KA-747	Musukina Bhavi	Uttara Kannada				Musukina Bhavi

== See also ==
- List of Monuments of National Importance in Karnataka
- List of State Protected Monuments in India
