= List of State Protected Monuments in Karnataka =

This is a list of State Protected Monuments, as officially reported by and available through the website of the Archaeological Survey of India in the Indian state Karnataka. The monument identifier is a combination of the abbreviation of the subdivision of the list (state, ASI circle) and the numbering as published on the website of the ASI. 747 State Protected Monuments have been recognized by the ASI in Karnataka. Subsequently location details for the monuments has been made available by the Department of Archeology Museums and Heritage of Government of Karnataka as a report and digital map.

The list for State Protected Monuments in Karnataka is long, so it has been split into two parts. Monuments No. S-KA-1 to S-KA-352 in this part and Monuments S-KA-353 to S-KA-747 in List of State Protected Monuments in Karnataka Part II.

Besides the State Protected Monuments, also the Monuments of National Importance in this state might be relevant.

== List of state protected monuments ==
SL. No.	Description	Location	Address	District	Coordinates	Image
S-KA-1	Shiva Temple	Belagali		Bagalakote	16°23′06″N 75°09′03″E	Upload Photo
S-KA-2	Temples of Anantha, Maruti, Ramalinga	Anwal		Bagalakote	16°05′58″N 75°28′24″E	Upload Photo
S-KA-3	Arettina Bavi With Inscription, Rajana Bavi in town with inscriptions, pond and Siddeshwara Temple	Bilagi		Bagalakote	16°21′03″N 75°37′06″E	Upload Photo
S-KA-4	Temples of Dhaneshwara, Maruti	Dhannur		Bagalakote	16°11′17″N 76°05′47″E	Upload Photo
S-KA-5	Tombs of Prophets Malyappa and Monappa	Gaddankeri		Bagalakote	16°10′46″N 75°37′45″E	Upload Photo
S-KA-6	Large temple in bed of Krishna and small temple of Yellamma			Bagalakote		Large temple in bed of Krishna and small temple of Yellamma
S-KA-7	Old temple of Kameshwara	Gudur		Bagalakote	15°56′19″N 75°54′48″E	Upload Photo
S-KA-8	Remains of Jain temple called Moguti			Bagalakote		Upload Photo
S-KA-9	Three temples, probably Jain, Three old inscriptions			Bagalakote		Upload Photo
S-KA-10	Temple of Ranganatha with Kannada inscription and Maruthi	Kelwadi		Bagalakote	16°04′04″N 75°42′36″E	Upload Photo
S-KA-11	Temples of Hanumantha and Shiva	Galgali		Bagalakote	16°25′08″N 75°26′19″E	Upload Photo
S-KA-12	Ishwara temple with stone tablet	Mankani		Bagalakote	16°17′23″N 75°58′03″E	Upload Photo
S-KA-13	Temples of Hanumantha, Honna Hava, Devakod Hanumappa; 2 shrines of Basava	Mushtageri		Bagalakote	15°57′39″N 75°34′08″E	Upload Photo
S-KA-14	Inscription 4' long	Huchanur Nagur		Bagalakote	16°00′13″N 76°01′17″E	Upload Photo
S-KA-15	Kalappa Temple	Nandwadgi		Bagalakote	16°00′56″N 76°16′49″E	Upload Photo
S-KA-16	Sangameshwara Temple	Kudala Sangama		Bagalakote	16°12′26″N 76°03′57″E	Sangameshwara Temple More images
S-KA-17	Temples of Ramalinga, Lakshmi, Lakshminarayana	Siruru		Bagalakote	16°05′53″N 75°46′56″E	Upload Photo
S-KA-18	Maruti temple	Tulasigere		Bagalakote	16°11′30″N 75°33′13″E	Upload Photo
S-KA-19	Chikkamahakuteshwara	Nandikeshwara		Bagalakote	15°55′57″N 75°43′17″E	Chikkamahakuteshwara More images
S-KA-20	Ramatheertha palace	Ramathirtha		Bagalakote	16°30′08″N 75°16′12″E	Ramatheertha palace
S-KA-21	Cave temples of Gangadhareshwara and Honnadevi	Shivagange		Bengaluru Rural	13°10′40″N 77°13′29″E	Cave temples of Gangadhareshwara and Honnadevi More images
S-KA-22	Muktinatheshwara Temple	Binnamangala		Bengaluru Rural	13°05′15″N 77°25′06″E	Upload Photo
S-KA-23	Akkalshah Khadri Darga, Makhan, Tomb of Hyder's priest	Channapatna		Ramnagara	12°39′40″N 77°12′45″E	Upload Photo
S-KA-24	Agasateeshwara Temple	Channapatna		Ramnagara	12°38′58″N 77°11′10″E	Upload Photo
S-KA-25	Aprameyaswamy Temple	Mallur, Karnataka		Ramnagara	12°38′50″N 77°10′47″E	Aprameyaswamy Temple More images
S-KA-26	Narayanaswamy Temple	Mallur, Karnataka		Ramnagara	12°35′44″N 77°10′49″E	Upload Photo
S-KA-27	Kundapuraswamy Brindavan	Abbur		Ramnagara	12°42′13″N 77°10′33″E	Upload Photo
S-KA-28	Someshwaraswamy Temple	Magadi		Ramnagara	12°57′43″N 77°12′38″E	Someshwaraswamy Temple More images
S-KA-29	Ranganathaswami Temple	Magadi		Ramnagara	12°57′28″N 77°14′34″E	Ranganathaswami Temple More images
S-KA-30	Venugopalaswamy Temple, Devanahalli	Devanahalli		Bengaluru Rural	13°14′57″N 77°42′32″E	Venugopalaswamy Temple, Devanahalli More images
S-KA-31	Someshwara Temple and Inscriptions	Gangavara		Bengaluru Rural	13°09′05″N 77°45′52″E	Upload Photo
S-KA-32	Inscriptions	Aradeshanahalli		Bengaluru Rural	13°13′18″N 77°33′51″E	Upload Photo
S-KA-33	Inscribed pier in Memory of Mr. Close	Ramnagara		Ramnagara		Upload Photo
S-KA-34	Ashurkhana	Doddaballapura		Bengaluru Rural	13°17′30″N 77°32′29″E	Upload Photo
S-KA-35	Syed Ibrahim's Tomb	Channapatna		Ramnagara	12°39′45″N 77°12′54″E	Upload Photo
S-KA-36	Thirty five Megalithic Monuments in Sy. Nos.14 and 185	Jadigenahalli		Bengaluru Rural	13°02′49″N 77°51′36″E	Upload Photo
S-KA-37	Megalithic Monuments in Sy. No.50	Kannurahalli		Bengaluru Rural	13°03′28″N 77°49′10″E	Upload Photo
S-KA-38	Ramadevaru Sitadevi	Kudlur		Ramnagara	12°36′57″N 77°11′16″E	Upload Photo
S-KA-39	Kote Venkataramana Temple, Bengaluru	Bengaluru		Bengaluru Urban	12°57′34″N 77°34′27″E	Kote Venkataramana Temple, Bengaluru More images
S-KA-40	Kempe Gowda's Watch Towers 4 Nos	Bengaluru		Bengaluru Urban	12°56′55″N 77°35′22″E	Kempe Gowda's Watch Towers 4 Nos More images
S-KA-41	Gavi Gangadhareshwara Temple	Bengaluru		Bengaluru Urban	12°56′53″N 77°33′47″E	Gavi Gangadhareshwara Temple More images
S-KA-42	Dodda Basavana Gudi	Basavanagudi		Bengaluru Urban	12°56′31″N 77°34′05″E	Dodda Basavana Gudi More images
S-KA-43	Mallikarjuna Temple and Boulder Inscription	Malleshwaram		Bengaluru Urban	13°00′18″N 77°34′19″E	Mallikarjuna Temple and Boulder Inscription More images
S-KA-44	Bowring Institute	Bengaluru		Bengaluru Urban	12°58′28″N 77°36′02″E	Bowring Institute More images
S-KA-45	Tomb of pir Kazi	Ainapur		Belgaum	16°40′00″N 74°53′52″E	Upload Photo
S-KA-46	Gandharvagadh Fort	Kerewade		Maharashtra	15°57′17″N 74°14′27″E	Upload Photo
S-KA-47	Lakshmi Temple, Math of Adavyappaswamy	Anakalgi		Belgaum	16°01′27″N 74°41′42″E	Upload Photo
S-KA-48	Wall ornamented with sculpture	Arbhavi		Belgaum	16°13′35″N 74°48′36″E	Upload Photo
S-KA-49	Small plain temple of Ramalingadeva	Asoga		Belgaum	15°37′39″N 74°28′45″E	Upload Photo
S-KA-50	Mud Fort; Temple of Siddeshwara, Amriteshwara Mahadeva; Mosque	Athani Badgi		Belgaum	16°43′39″N 75°04′26″E	Upload Photo
S-KA-51	Old Jain Temple	Athani		Belgaum	16°43′49″N 75°03′51″E	Upload Photo
S-KA-52	Copper plate of 7th Deogiri Yadav King	Bagewadi		Belgaum		Upload Photo
S-KA-53	Basaveshwara Temple	Balligeri		Belgaum	16°51′27″N 75°08′25″E	Upload Photo
S-KA-54	Fort	Akkivat		Belgaum		Upload Photo
S-KA-55	Remains of fort called Machigadh or Hanumantgadh	Bijagarnigud		Belgaum	15°32′34″N 74°34′19″E	Upload Photo
S-KA-56	Temple of Ravalnatha with Persian Inscription	Chandgad		Maharashtra	15°56′27″N 74°10′50″E	Upload Photo
S-KA-57	Rameshwara Temple	Chorlu		Belgaum	15°39′38″N 74°08′25″E	Upload Photo
S-KA-58	Fort	Hanur		Belgaum		Upload Photo
S-KA-59	Mahalingeshwara Temple, Basava temple, Ruins of 4 other Temples; Fort; 2 Mosque	Gokak		Belgaum	16°11′28″N 74°46′39″E	Upload Photo
S-KA-60	Bhimgad Fort	Bhimgad Wildlife Sanctuary		Belgaum	15°33′54″N 74°20′07″E	Upload Photo
S-KA-61	Tomb of Muslim Saint	Jugul		Belgaum	16°37′22″N 74°41′16″E	Upload Photo
S-KA-62	Ruined temple of Eshwaradeva with inscription; 2 ruined temples	Kabbur		Belgaum	16°20′48″N 74°43′42″E	Upload Photo
S-KA-63	Temples of Brahmanatha and Satvai	Kagwad		Belgaum	16°41′29″N 74°43′11″E	Upload Photo
S-KA-64	Ruined Fort	Kalanandigadh		Maharashtra	15°51′37″N 74°15′09″E	Upload Photo
S-KA-65	Temples of Harideva and Mallikarjuna; Old shrine of Daridevi	Kanmadi		Belgaum	16°58′10″N 75°22′31″E	Temples of Harideva and Mallikarjuna; Old shrine of Daridevi
S-KA-66	Gatti Basavanna	Karoshi		Belgaum	16°23′36″N 74°34′52″E	Upload Photo
S-KA-67	Yellamma temple	Kokatnur		Belgaum	16°41′38″N 75°14′19″E	Upload Photo
S-KA-68	Black stone tomb of Muslim Saint	Kudchi		Belgaum	16°38′02″N 74°50′54″E	Upload Photo
S-KA-69	Mahipalgad	Mahipalgad		Maharashtra	15°54′08″N 74°23′04″E	Upload Photo
S-KA-70	Temples of Kunukumbeshwara and Mahakidevi	Kunkumbi		Belgaum	15°42′20″N 74°13′10″E	Upload Photo
S-KA-71	Martanda temple	Mangsuli		Belgaum	16°44′22″N 74°49′06″E	Upload Photo
S-KA-72	Inscription in Maruti temple	Nagalaj		Belgaum		Upload Photo
S-KA-73	Fine temple in ruins	Nandgaon		Belgaum	16°40′46″N 75°07′39″E	Upload Photo
S-KA-74	Fort Nippani	Nippani		Belgaum	16°23′58″N 74°22′55″E	Upload Photo
S-KA-75	Vaishnava temple of Govindaraj	Nippani		Belgaum		Upload Photo
S-KA-76	Parasgad Fort	Parasgad		Belgaum	15°44′22″N 75°07′44″E	Upload Photo
S-KA-77	Savadatti Fort	Savadatti		Belgaum	15°46′05″N 75°06′47″E	Upload Photo
S-KA-78	Partheshwara temple in black stone	Parthanahalli		Belgaum		Upload Photo
S-KA-79	Anandparvat Hill; old Rameshwara temple	Ramtirth		Belgaum	16°51′19″N 75°15′37″E	Upload Photo
S-KA-80	Spring and temple of Rasai	Rasai hill		Belgaum	16°20′29″N 74°19′58″E	Upload Photo
S-KA-81	Shankaralinga Temple	Sankeshwar		Belgaum	16°15′04″N 74°28′43″E	Upload Photo
S-KA-82	Kashilinga Temple of Black stone	Saptasagar		Belgaum	16°38′00″N 74°57′07″E	Upload Photo
S-KA-83	Tomb of Muslim Saint	Savadi		Belgaum	16°35′15″N 75°09′23″E	Tomb of Muslim Saint
S-KA-84	Fort Shamshergadh	Shamshergadh		Belgaum		Upload Photo
S-KA-85	Kalammadevi temple	Sirasangi		Belgaum	15°52′36″N 75°15′25″E	Kalammadevi temple
S-KA-86	Old temple and Monumental stones	Sivanur		Belgaum		Upload Photo
S-KA-87	Narasimha temple	Shurapali		Belgaum	16°35′02″N 75°16′56″E	Upload Photo
S-KA-88	Someshwara temple	Someshwar Hill		Belgaum	15°51′41″N 74°58′24″E	Upload Photo
S-KA-89	Shankaralinga temple	Talvarkop		Belgaum		Upload Photo
S-KA-90	Bharamappa temple	Tavadi		Belgaum	16°21′22″N 74°24′30″E	Bharamappa temple
S-KA-91	Fine old temples of Mukteshwara, Mallikarjun, Renuka, Yallamma	Vakkund		Belgaum		Upload Photo
S-KA-92	Vallabhgad Fort	Vallabhgad		Belgaum	16°16′46″N 74°27′34″E	Upload Photo
S-KA-93	Fort Yamakanamaradi	Yamakanamaradi		Belgaum	16°07′49″N 74°31′41″E	Upload Photo
S-KA-94	Veerabhadra temple with Inscriptions	Yadur		Belgaum	16°34′26″N 74°39′25″E	Upload Photo
S-KA-95	Shrine of Yellamma	Yellamma’s hill		Belgaum	15°45′16″N 75°09′15″E	Upload Photo
S-KA-96	Ruined Fort	Yellurgad		Belgaum	15°45′26″N 74°31′35″E	Upload Photo
S-KA-97	Rani Channamma Palace and the fort	Kittur		Belgaum	15°36′04″N 74°47′29″E	Upload Photo
S-KA-98	Tomb of Sangolli Rayanna and place where Sangolli Rayanna was hanged to death	Nandagad		Belgaum	15°34′44″N 74°34′25″E	Upload Photo
S-KA-99	Hatakeshwara temple	Halda		Belgaum	15°32′27″N 74°35′22″E	Upload Photo
S-KA-100	Virupaksha Temple, Hampi	Hampi		Vijayanagara	15°20′06″N 76°27′31″E	Virupaksha Temple, Hampi More images
S-KA-101	Krishnanagar fort	Sandur, Krishnanagar		Ballari	15°05′45″N 76°33′16″E	Upload Photo
S-KA-102	Kallesvaraswamy temple	Sogi		Vijayanagara	14°58′03″N 75°59′50″E	Upload Photo
S-KA-103	Mantapa near Hallikere	Hallikere		Vijayanagara	15°17′17″N 76°28′56″E	Upload Photo
S-KA-104	Jambunatheshwara Temple	Hospet		Vijayanagara	15°14′13″N 76°24′30″E	Jambunatheshwara Temple More images
S-KA-105	Hampi group of monuments (except those under ASI)	Hampi		Vijayanagara	15°20′06″N 76°27′43″E	Hampi group of monuments (except those under ASI) More images
S-KA-106	Choubara	Bidar		Bidar	17°54′42″N 77°31′48″E	Choubara More images
S-KA-107	Farah Bagh Mosque and Narsimha Temple	Bidar		Bidar	17°54′11″N 77°32′38″E	Upload Photo
S-KA-108	Kali Masjid	Bidar		Bidar	17°54′36″N 77°30′46″E	Upload Photo
S-KA-109	Suladat spring, Suvl and Bangadi of H.Sayyid -Us - Sadat	Bidar		Bidar	17°55′43″N 77°30′33″E	Upload Photo
S-KA-110	Dargah of H. Khali Mullah (Cheukhandi)	Ashtoor		Bidar	17°55′05″N 77°33′15″E	Upload Photo
S-KA-111	Amir Fakrul Mulk Gilan's tomb	Fathepur		Bidar	17°59′05″N 77°33′06″E	Upload Photo
S-KA-112	Pre-historic site			Bidar		Upload Photo
S-KA-113	Bidar Fort	Bidar		Bidar	17°55′25″N 77°31′34″E	Bidar Fort More images
S-KA-114	Sri Eshwara temple	Jalasangvi		Bidar	17°49′53″N 77°10′35″E	Sri Eshwara temple More images
S-KA-115	Maqbara Mahmood Gavan	Bidar		Bidar	17°52′52″N 77°32′04″E	Upload Photo
S-KA-116	Shankaralingadeva temple, Hemadpanti temple with inscribed stone	Agarkhed		Vijayapura		Upload Photo
S-KA-117	Mallikarjuna Temple	Ankalgi		Vijayapura		Upload Photo
S-KA-118	Jain temple, 2 Shaivite temple, 2 inscribed stones	Basarkod		Vijayapura		Upload Photo
S-KA-119	Temples of Basaveshwara, Rameshwara (Jain), Basavanna Well	Bagewadi		Vijayapura		Upload Photo
S-KA-120	Maleswamy temple	Bellubbi		Vijayapura		Upload Photo
S-KA-121	Siddeshwara temple	Bableshwar		Vijayapura		Upload Photo
S-KA-122	Temple of Ramalinga, Paramananda Deva	Chandkavathe		Vijayapura		Upload Photo
S-KA-123	Temple of Dattathreya with inscription	Chattarki		Vijayapura		Upload Photo
S-KA-124	Temples of Kalameshwara, Mallikarjuna and Shankaralinga	Devangaon		Vijayapura		Upload Photo
S-KA-125	Temples of Shiva, Eshwara	Chimmalgi		Vijayapura		Upload Photo
S-KA-126	Old temple of Shankaralingadeva	Dhulkhed		Vijayapura		Upload Photo
S-KA-127	Temple of Golalishwara	Golgeri		Vijayapura		Upload Photo
S-KA-128	Temples of Narsoba, Amriteshwara	Halsangi		Vijayapura		Upload Photo
S-KA-129	Eshwara temple	Hebbal		Vijayapura		Upload Photo
S-KA-130	Temples of Kalameshwara, Mallikarjuna, Mallaya, Heggappaya, Madiwaleshwara	Hippargi		Vijayapura		Upload Photo
S-KA-131	Bhageshwara temple	Hirur		Vijayapura		Upload Photo
S-KA-132	Temples of Siddeshwara, Mallikarjuna, Eshwara	Horti		Vijayapura		Upload Photo
S-KA-133	Temples of Narayandeva, Siddeshwara and Ananthashayana	Ingaleshwar		Vijayapura		Upload Photo
S-KA-134	Temples of Ramadeva, Rameshwara	Ittagi		Vijayapura		Upload Photo
S-KA-135	Temples of Lingadakatti Papannashankatti and Ramatirtha	Ainapur		Vijayapura		Upload Photo
S-KA-136	Temples of Mahipatiswami Mallikarjuna, Sangameshwara, Karvirbhadra	Kukhandki		Vijayapura		Upload Photo
S-KA-137	Sangameshwara temple; Sculptures of elephants, lovers of Buddha	Kadakola		Vijayapura		Upload Photo
S-KA-138	Sangameshwara Temple, Eshwara temple	Kadlewadi		Vijayapura		Upload Photo
S-KA-139	Fort; Temples			Vijayapura		Fort; Temples More images
S-KA-140	Mosque and Tomb of Gangapaya	Khanapur		Vijayapura		Upload Photo
S-KA-141	Temple of Bageshwara with worn inscriptions	Kuntoji		Vijayapura		Upload Photo
S-KA-142	Temples of Bail Hanumantha, Mahalakshmi, Mahalingeshwara, Madiwaleshwara, Tomb of Saint Kamal Saheb; inscription of dams	Mundapur		Vijayapura		Upload Photo
S-KA-143	Ramalinga temple	Managoli		Vijayapura		Upload Photo
S-KA-144	Eshwara Temple	Muddebihal		Vijayapura		Upload Photo
S-KA-145	Temples of Hanuman, Ramalings, Mukteshwara, Lakshmi, Narasimha, Lakshminarayana, Kashi Vishweshwara	Muttagi		Vijayapura		Upload Photo
S-KA-146	Temples of Eshwara, Basavanna and Veerabhadra, Inscriptions	Nalatwad		Vijayapura		Upload Photo
S-KA-147	Maruti temple	Nimbargi		Vijayapura		Upload Photo
S-KA-148	Ancient Temple in Chalukya style	Padaganur		Vijayapura		Upload Photo
S-KA-149	Shiav Yogeshwara temple	Salotgi		Vijayapura		Upload Photo
S-KA-150	Temple of Sangameshwara and Nelaganga	Sindhi		Vijayapura		Upload Photo
S-KA-151	Shiva Temple, Jama Mosque, Panch Pir Mosque	Talikote		Vijayapura		Shiva Temple, Jama Mosque, Panch Pir Mosque
S-KA-152	Inscriptions	Tambe		Vijayapura		Upload Photo
S-KA-153	Temples of Narasimha, Hanumantha, Narasimha Tirth	Torvi		Vijayapura		Temples of Narasimha, Hanumantha, Narasimha Tirth
S-KA-154	Maruti Temple with inscriptions	Tubgi		Vijayapura		Upload Photo
S-KA-155	Hanumanta temple	Yelgur		Vijayapura		Upload Photo
S-KA-156	Sangameshwara temple	Miragi		Vijayapura		Upload Photo
S-KA-157	Durga temple	Masali B.K.		Vijayapura		Upload Photo
S-KA-158	Eshwara Temple	Nandaragi		Vijayapura		Upload Photo
S-KA-159	Rameshwara temple	Chamarajnagara				Upload Photo
S-KA-160	Varadaraja Temple	Chamarajnagara				Upload Photo
S-KA-161	Chamarajeshwara temple	Chamarajnagara				Chamarajeshwara temple
S-KA-162	Residence of Dewan Poornayya	Chamarajnagara				Upload Photo
S-KA-163	Eshwara, Yupasthambha and Kodanda Ramaswamy temple	Chikkamagaluru				Upload Photo
S-KA-164	Shiva Temple	Chikkamagaluru				Upload Photo
S-KA-165	Siddeshwara Temple	Chikkamagaluru				Upload Photo
S-KA-166	Channakeshwara Temple	Chikkamagaluru				Upload Photo
S-KA-167	Markandeshwara Temple	Chikkamagaluru				Upload Photo
S-KA-168	Someshwara Temple	Chikkamagaluru				Upload Photo
S-KA-169	Lakshmikanta temple and Lakshmeesha monuments	Chikkamagalur				Upload Photo
S-KA-170	Jain Bastis	Chikkamagaluru				Upload Photo
S-KA-171	Keshava Statue in the ruined temple	Chikkamagaluru				Upload Photo
S-KA-172	Kalasheshwara Temple	Chikkamagaluru				Kalasheshwara Temple
S-KA-173	Gangeshwara, Parameshwara, Veerabhadreshwara, Chandikeshwaraswamy Temple	Chikkamagaluru				Upload Photo
S-KA-174	Yoganarasimhaswamy temple	Chikkamagaluru				Upload Photo
S-KA-175	Rangayyana Bagilu, Fort Gate	Chitradurga				Rangayyana Bagilu, Fort Gate
S-KA-176	Siddeshwara Temple	Chitradurga				Siddeshwara Temple
S-KA-177	Channakeshava Temple	Chitradurga				Upload Photo
S-KA-178	Trisankeshwara Temple	Chitradurga				Upload Photo
S-KA-179	Lakshminarayana Temple	Chitradurga				Upload Photo
S-KA-180	Rock cut Temples	Chitradurga				Rock cut Temples
S-KA-181	Jain Bastis	Chitradurga				Upload Photo
S-KA-182	Durga Parameshwara [Trishulini]	Dakshin Kannada	Balpa Subramanya	Dakshina Kannada	12°41′21″N 75°31′05″E	Durga Parameshwara [Trishulini]
S-KA-183	Eshwara Temple (Anakonda)	Davanagere				Upload Photo
S-KA-184	Eshwara Temple (Nandigudi)	Davanagere				Upload Photo
S-KA-185	Eshwara Temple (Nanditavare)	Davanagere				Upload Photo
S-KA-186	Rajamadakaarinayakana 200 A Samadhi	Davanagere				Upload Photo
S-KA-187	Thimmanna Nayaka's Tomb	Davanagere				Upload Photo
S-KA-188	Kalleshwara Swamy Temple	Davanagere				Upload Photo
S-KA-189	Ranganathaswamy Temple	Davanagere				Upload Photo
S-KA-190	Inscription on Eshwara temple	Dharwad				Upload Photo
S-KA-191	Jain temple of Neminatha	Dharwad				Upload Photo
S-KA-192	Shaiva temples of Sri Kalmeshvara	Dharwad				Upload Photo
S-KA-193	Mallikarjuna temple and Inscriptions	Dharwad				Upload Photo
S-KA-194	Veerabhadra Temple with Inscription	Dharwad				Upload Photo
S-KA-195	Two Inscriptions	Dharwad				Upload Photo
S-KA-196	Ruined temple of Ramalinga with three Inscriptions	Dharwad				Upload Photo
S-KA-197	Siddeshwara temple with pillars and Inscriptions	Dharwad				Upload Photo
S-KA-198	Veerabhadradeva Temple with Inscription	Dharwad				Upload Photo
S-KA-199	Mallikarjuna and Netagalla Basavanna temple	Dharwad				Upload Photo
S-KA-200	Temple of Budangudden called Ajavankatti	Dharwad				Upload Photo
S-KA-201	Kalmeshvara temple with stone inscription	Dharwad				Upload Photo
S-KA-202	Ranganath temple	Dharwad				Upload Photo
S-KA-203	Hanuman temple with 6 inscriptions	Dharwad				Upload Photo
S-KA-204	Shambulinga temple with inscription	Dharwad				Upload Photo
S-KA-205	Veerabhadra temple and inscriptions	Dharwad				Upload Photo
S-KA-206	Old town, 3 Brahminical and 2 Lingayat temples, mosques, New town - 15 Brahminical, 5 Lingayat, 1 Jain temple; Monasteries; old and new fort	Dharwad				Upload Photo
S-KA-207	Narayanadeva temple with 5 inscriptions	Dharwad				Upload Photo
S-KA-208	Kalmeshwara Temple; 2 inscriptions	Dharwad				Upload Photo
S-KA-209	Fine temple with carvings	Dharwad				Fine temple with carvings
S-KA-210	Lingayat temple of Veerabhadra, Someshwara, Siddalinga	Dharwad				Upload Photo
S-KA-211	Temple of Kallappadeva and Ramalingadeva with inscription	Dharwad				Upload Photo
S-KA-212	Solabeshwara temple with inscription	Dharwad				Upload Photo
S-KA-213	Temple of Siddalinga and Kalmeshvara with inscriptions	Dharwad				Upload Photo
S-KA-214	Rameshwara Temple with inscriptions	Dharwad				Upload Photo
S-KA-215	Kalmeshwaradeva Temple with inscriptions	Dharwad				Upload Photo
S-KA-216	Kalmeshwara Temple with 4 inscriptions	Dharwad				Upload Photo
S-KA-217	Carved and inscribed slabs	Dharwad				Upload Photo
S-KA-218	Veerabhadra temple 3 inscriptions	Dharwad				Upload Photo
S-KA-219	Narayana temple with stone inscriptions	Dharwad				Upload Photo
S-KA-220	Europian Samadhigalu	Dharwad				Upload Photo
S-KA-221	Black stone temples of Sri Eshwaradeva and Jyotilingadeva with inscriptions	Gadag				Upload Photo
S-KA-222	Eshwara temple with inscriptions	Gadag				Upload Photo
S-KA-223	Temple of Somappa and Hanuman with inscriptions	Gadag				Upload Photo
S-KA-224	Temple of Veerabhadra with Inscriptions	Gadag				Upload Photo
S-KA-225	Bharateshwara temple with Inscriptions	Gadag				Upload Photo
S-KA-226	Hanumanta temple	Gadag				Upload Photo
S-KA-227	Temples of Venkatesha, Dandeshwara	Gadag				Upload Photo
S-KA-228	Inscriptions	Gadag				Upload Photo
S-KA-229	Maruti Deva	Gadag				Upload Photo
S-KA-230	Temples of Virupaksha, Ramalinga, Pandurangadeva, caves, Tirthas; Shrines of Veerabhadra and Kalkeshwara	Gadag				Upload Photo
S-KA-231	Rameshwara temple; cave	Gadag				Upload Photo
S-KA-232	Inscriptions in front of Narayana temple	Gadag				Upload Photo
S-KA-233	Seven Inscriptions	Gadag				Upload Photo
S-KA-234	Temples of Gramadevata, Maruti, Mosques	Gadag				Upload Photo
S-KA-235	Stone inscriptions in Maruti temple	Gadag				Upload Photo
S-KA-236	Inscriptions in temple of Madesh Linga	Gadag				Upload Photo
S-KA-237	Temples of Kalmeshwara and Siddeshwara with Inscriptions	Gadag				Upload Photo
S-KA-238	Maruti temple with well preserved inscriptions	Gadag				Upload Photo
S-KA-239	Inscriptions in Brahmadeva temple	Gadag				Upload Photo
S-KA-240	Temple of Parameshwaradeva and Rameshwaradeva	Gadag				Upload Photo
S-KA-241	Old temple with good carving	Gadag				Upload Photo
S-KA-242	Somappa temple with 2 inscriptions	Gadag				Upload Photo
S-KA-243	Temple of Gavaresvar Keri Basappa, Shankaralinga, Virupaksha and inscriptions	Gadag				Upload Photo
S-KA-244	Temples of Gramadevate, Hanuman, Makhan	Gadag				Upload Photo
S-KA-245	Temples of Someshwaradeva, Lakshmilinga and Kodiyellamma, Sankabasti and Halabasti (Jain), Kali Masjid; inscriptions	Gadag				Upload Photo
S-KA-246	5 Brahmanic, 4 Jain temples, large rock with unfinished carving and inscription	Gadag				Upload Photo
S-KA-247	Mahabaleshwara Temple with inscriptions	Gadag				Upload Photo
S-KA-248	Tripurantakeshwara, Someshwaradeva, Kalmeshwaradeva, Chandramoulishwaradeva, Narayanadeva	Gadag				Upload Photo
S-KA-249	Fort, Temples of Shankaralinga, Mahabaleshwara, Venkatesha	Gadag				Upload Photo
S-KA-250	Narayana temple	Gadag				Upload Photo
S-KA-251	Dronacharya temple	Gadag				Upload Photo
S-KA-252	Temples of Brahmadeva and Narayanadeva	Gadag				Upload Photo
S-KA-253	Temple of Malgi, Eshwara and Torangalla Brahmadeva and 4 Inscriptions	Gadag				Upload Photo
S-KA-254	Palace	Gadag				Upload Photo
S-KA-255	Shaivite temple of Eshwara, Maleshwara and Veerabhadra; Jain Temple; 5 inscriptions	Gadag				Upload Photo
S-KA-256	3 temples of Basavanna with inscription, temple of Mallikarjuna, Eshwara and Ganapati	Gadag				Upload Photo
S-KA-257	Kariyammadevi temple Gramadevate	Gadag				Upload Photo
S-KA-258	Temples of Hanuman and Eshwara with inscriptions	Gadag				Upload Photo
S-KA-259	Jain statute	Gadag				Upload Photo
S-KA-260	Brameshwara temple	Gadag				Upload Photo
S-KA-261	Eshwara temple	Gadag				Upload Photo
S-KA-262	Veeranarayandevara Gudi	Gadag				Veeranarayandevara Gudi
S-KA-263	Halalamma temple Srimantha Feda Fort	Gadag				Upload Photo
S-KA-264	Tomb of Alla udin Hassan Gangu Bahamani	Gulbarga				Upload Photo
S-KA-265	Tomb of Mohammed Shah 1	Gulbarga				Upload Photo
S-KA-266	Dargah of Hazrat Khwaja Band Nawaz Syed Mohammed Gesu Darz	Gulbarga				Dargah of Hazrat Khwaja Band Nawaz Syed Mohammed Gesu Darz
S-KA-267	Large Bijapuri arch and Afzal Khan's Mosque inside the Dargah premises	Gulbarga				Upload Photo
S-KA-268	Chand Bibi's Tomb	Gulbarga				Upload Photo
S-KA-269	Siddi Ambais tomb	Gulbarga				Upload Photo
S-KA-270	Ismail Mokh's mosque and tomb	Gulbarga				Upload Photo
S-KA-271	Shah Bazaar Mosque and Hammam	Gulbarga				Upload Photo
S-KA-272	Chor Gumbad	Gulbarga				Chor Gumbad
S-KA-273	Old Idgah	Gulbarga				Upload Photo
S-KA-274	Dargah of Hazrat Shaikh Sirajuddin Junaidi	Gulbarga				Upload Photo
S-KA-275	Langar-ki-masjid	Gulbarga				Upload Photo
S-KA-276	Dargah, Mosque, Sarai of H.K. Kamal Mujarrad	Gulbarga				Upload Photo
S-KA-277	Qalandar Khan's Mosque and tomb	Gulbarga				Upload Photo
S-KA-278	Hirapur Mosque and well	Gulbarga				Upload Photo
S-KA-279	Fiozabad Remains	Gulbarga				Upload Photo
S-KA-280	Bahmani Tombs at Holkonda	Gulbarga				Upload Photo
S-KA-281	Neolithic Implements	Gulbarga				Upload Photo
S-KA-282	Shorapur Fort, Taylor Manzil, etc.	Gulbarga				Upload Photo
S-KA-283	Cairns	Gulbarga				Upload Photo
S-KA-284	Pre- historic site (Shorapur)	Gulbarga				Upload Photo
S-KA-285	Pre- historic site (Shorapur)	Gulbarga				Upload Photo
S-KA-286	Pre- historic site (Hungsi)	Gulbarga				Upload Photo
S-KA-287	Pre- historic site (Yaddalbhavi)	Gulbarga				Upload Photo
S-KA-288	Pre- historic site (Hagaratgi)	Gulbarga				Upload Photo
S-KA-289	Pre- historic site (Kakkera)	Yadgir				Upload Photo
S-KA-290	Stone circles	Gulbarga				Upload Photo
S-KA-291	Pre- historic Cairns (Sagar)	Gulbarga				Upload Photo
S-KA-292	Pre- historic Cairns (Thaumandi - Tanda)	Gulbarga				Upload Photo
S-KA-293	Pre- historic Cairns (Uppalai)	Gulbarga				Upload Photo
S-KA-294	Pre- historic stone circles (Buchaimatti)	Gulbarga				Upload Photo
S-KA-295	Pre- historic stone circles (Mallur)	Gulbarga				Upload Photo
S-KA-296	Pre- historic stone circles (Mallur)	Gulbarga				Upload Photo
S-KA-297	Pre- historic Cromlech	Gulbarga				Upload Photo
S-KA-298	Pre- historic Site	Gulbarga				Upload Photo
S-KA-299	Stone circles	Gulbarga				Upload Photo
S-KA-300	Pre-historic stone circles (Buchaimatti)	Gulbarga				Upload Photo
S-KA-301	Pre- historic stone circles (Mallur)	Gulbarga				Upload Photo
S-KA-302	Pre-historic graves	Gulbarga				Upload Photo
S-KA-303	Pre-historic cairns (Baillastapur)	Gulbarga				Upload Photo
S-KA-304	Pre-historic stone circles	Gulbarga				Upload Photo
S-KA-305	Pre-historic Cromlechs	Gulbarga				Upload Photo
S-KA-306	Tombs of Adil Shahi kings and other remains	Gulbarga				Upload Photo
S-KA-307	Pre-historic site (Gogti)	Gulbarga				Upload Photo
S-KA-308	Cairns	Gulbarga				Upload Photo
S-KA-309	Cairns and Avenues	Gulbarga				Upload Photo
S-KA-310	Pre-historic cairns	Gulbarga				Upload Photo
S-KA-311	Stone Circles	Gulbarga				Upload Photo
S-KA-312	Pre-historic cairns	Gulbarga				Upload Photo
S-KA-313	Avenues	Gulbarga				Upload Photo
S-KA-314	Sangar: Remains	Gulbarga				Upload Photo
S-KA-315	Shahpur Fort and other remains	Gulbarga				Upload Photo
S-KA-316	Avenues (Pre-historic burials)	Gulbarga				Upload Photo
S-KA-317	Shahpur Avenues and Menhirs	Gulbarga				Upload Photo
S-KA-318	Mosque and tomb of Afzal khan	Gulbarga				Upload Photo
S-KA-319	Ali Farhad Khan's mosque and inscription and Dargah of H.Sahik Allaudin Ansari	Gulbarga				Ali Farhad Khan's mosque and inscription and Dargah of H.Sahik Allaudin Ansari More images
S-KA-320	Panchalinga temple, monolithic pillar and other remains	Gulbarga				Upload Photo
S-KA-321	Malked Fort and other remains	Gulbarga				Upload Photo
S-KA-322	Nagai remains	Gulbarga				Upload Photo
S-KA-323	Pre-historic cairns (Uppaldivi)	Gulbarga				Upload Photo
S-KA-324	Pre-historic stone circles	Gulbarga				Upload Photo
S-KA-325	Pre-historic cairns (Kodemathai hill)	Gulbarga				Upload Photo
S-KA-326	Pre-historic cairns (Taivathivi)	Gulbarga				Upload Photo
S-KA-327	Pre-historic stone circles (Mandavalli)	Gulbarga				Upload Photo
S-KA-328	Pre-historic stone circles (Kottur)	Gulbarga				Upload Photo
S-KA-329	Pre-historic stone circles (Agalgi)	Gulbarga				Upload Photo
S-KA-330	Pre-historic stone circles (Helbahavi)	Gulbarga				Upload Photo
S-KA-331	Stone Circles	Gulbarga				Upload Photo
S-KA-332	Cromlechs	Gulbarga				Upload Photo
S-KA-333	Pre-historic cairns	Gulbarga				Upload Photo
S-KA-334	Pre-historic stone circles (Ijheri)	Gulbarga				Upload Photo
S-KA-335	Fort	Gulbarga				Upload Photo
S-KA-336	Pre-historic stone circles (Kodakal)	Gulbarga				Upload Photo
S-KA-337	Pre-historic cairns	Gulbarga				Upload Photo
S-KA-338	Cairns	Gulbarga				Upload Photo
S-KA-339	Stone Circles	Gulbarga				Upload Photo
S-KA-340	Pre-historic cairns (Anandapur)	Gulbarga				Upload Photo
S-KA-341	Pre-historic cairns (Yarkanapalli)	Gulbarga				Upload Photo
S-KA-342	Pre-historic stone circles	Gulbarga				Upload Photo
S-KA-343	Ranganatha temple with the Ramatirtha pond	Gulbarga				Upload Photo
S-KA-344	Maruti temple	Gulbarga				Upload Photo
S-KA-345	Mosque and inscriptions	Gulbarga				Upload Photo
S-KA-346	Raghunatha temple	Gulbarga				Upload Photo
S-KA-347	An old Hindu temple	Gulbarga				Upload Photo
S-KA-348	Veerabhadra temple with inscriptions	Gulbarga				Upload Photo
S-KA-349	Jami Masjid	Gulbarga				Upload Photo
S-KA-350	Hill Fort	Gulbarga				Upload Photo
S-KA-351	Mosque and inscriptions	Gulbarga				Upload Photo
S-KA-352	Hindu temple	Gulbarga				Upload Photo

== See also ==
- List of Monuments of National Importance in Karnataka
- List of State Protected Monuments in India
