= Ek Minar Mosque, Raichur =

Mosque in Raichur, Karnataka, India

Ek Minar Mosque
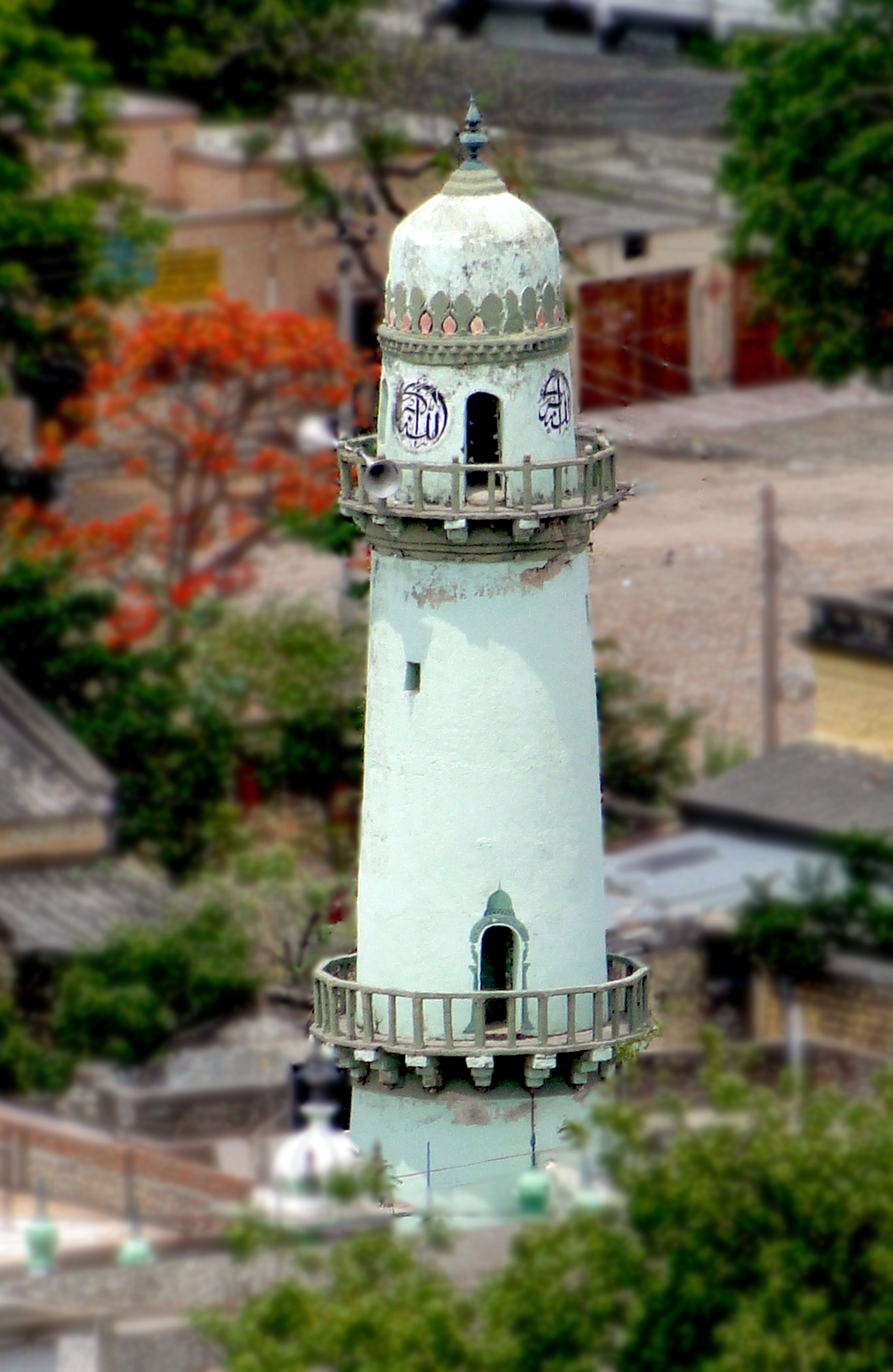
- The mosque minar, in 2011

- Location of the mosque in Karnataka

Religion
- Affiliation: Islam
- Ecclesiastical or organizational status: Mosque
- Status: Active

Location
- Location: Raichur, Karnataka
- Country: India
- Interactive map of Ek Minar Mosque
- Coordinates: 16°12′12″N 77°21′10″E

Architecture
- Type: Mosque architecture
- Style: Indo-Islamic; Bahmani
- Founder: Malik Ambar
- Completed: 919 AH (1513/1514 CE)

Specifications
- Minaret: One
- Minaret height: 20 metres (65 ft)
- Inscriptions: One (maybe more)

The Ek Minar Mosque, also known as Ek Minar Masjid (lit. 'One-minaret Mosque') and Ek Minar Ki Masjid (lit. 'Mosque of One Minaret'), is a mosque located in Raichur, in the state of Karnataka, India. The mosque is a state protected monument.

Whilst the minaret is standing, some of the historical structures in the grounds of the mosque were demolished in 2016 to enable an adjacent road to be widened.

== History ==
According to the Persian inscription on its threshold, it was commissioned by Malik Ambar, Peshwa (Prime Minister) of the Ahmadnagar Sultanate in 919 AH (1513/1514 CE) during the reign of Mahmud Shah Bahmani.

== Etymology ==
The mosque draws its name from the fact that it has only one minaret. In Indo-Islamic architecture, stand-alone minarets, such as the Qutb Minar and Chand Minar, would typically serve as victory towers, while minarets attached to mosques would be multiplied symmetrically for aesthetic reasons. The stand-alone minaret of this mosque is an exception to this rule.

== Architecture ==
There is a courtyard in front of the mosque, with two graves. At the head of the courtyard is a water cistern. The mosque is entered from the south, with the roof of the entrance being supported on eight Chalukyan pillars.

The prayer hall is rectangular, measuring approximately 12.2 by 9.1 metres (40 by 30 ft). It has a flat ceiling, and a battlement parapet rises above the roof. The western wall is decorated with verses from the Quran as well as hadith, inscribed in stone slabs.

=== Minaret ===
The minaret, for which the mosque is named, is the principal architectural characteristic. It is situated just above the entrance in the south-eastern corner of the courtyard. It rises to a height of approximately 20 metres (65 ft) and has a diameter of approximately 4.0 metres (13 ft). The minaret is built in a Persian style, very similar to the Chand Minar, as well as the minarets of the Mahmud Gawan Madrasa, both of which are earlier Bahmani-style constructions.

It consists of two stories, each being provided with windows to let in light and air, and each having galleries girded with stone balustrades. A winding staircase within leads up to the top story of the minaret. The minaret gradually tapers from bottom to top, and is surmounted by a typical Bahmani rounded dome, adorned with floral decorations at the bottom. The dome is topped by a pinnacle with a crescent.

== See also ==
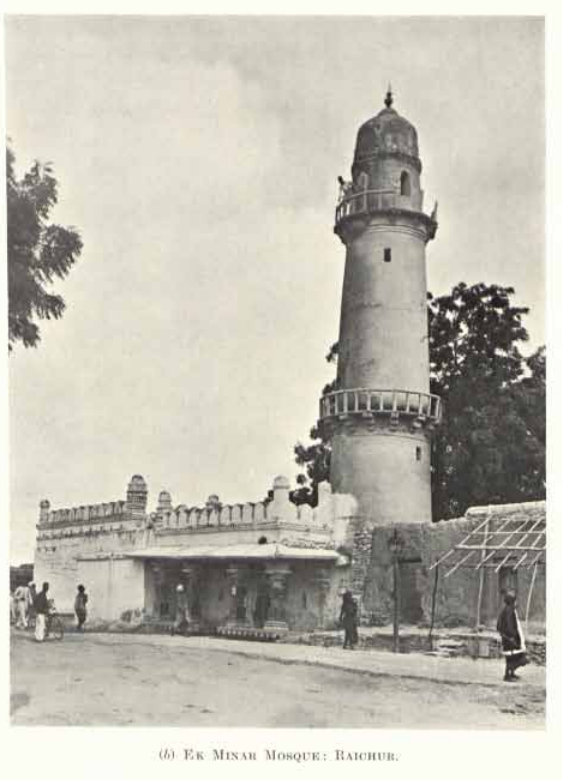
The mosque and minaret, c. 1933

- Islam in India
- List of mosques in India
- List of State Protected Monuments in Karnataka
