= Madiyal =

- village
- Country: India
- State: Karnataka
- District: Kalaburagi
- Talukas: Aland

Population (2001)
  - Total: 5,799

Languages
  - Official: Kannada
- Time zone: UTC+5:30 (IST)

Madiyal is a village in the northern state of Karnataka, India. It is located in the Aland taluk of Kalaburagi in Karnataka.

== Demographics ==
As of 2001 India census, Madiyal had a population of 5799 with 2920 males and 2879 females.

== See also ==
- Kalaburagi
- Districts of Karnataka
