= Ali Farhad Khan's Mosque =

Mosque in Aland, Karnataka, India

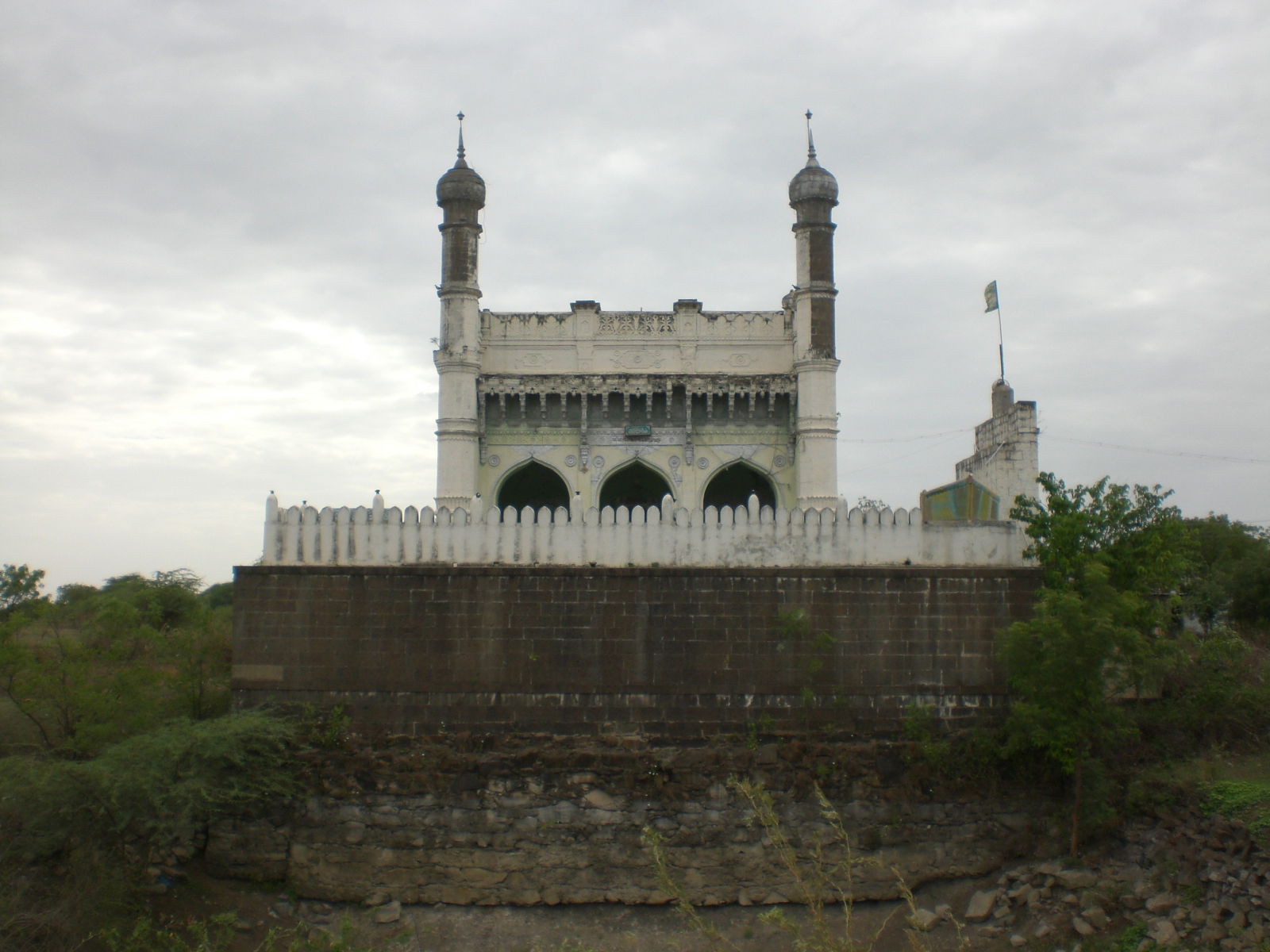
- The mosque, viewed from the east, in 2012

- Location of the mosque and dargah in Karnataka

Religion
- Affiliation: Islam
- Ecclesiastical or organizational status: Mosque and dargah
- Status: Active

Location
- Location: Aland, Karnataka
- Country: India
- Interactive map of Ali Farhad Khan's Mosque
- Coordinates: 17°33′25″N 76°33′32″E

Architecture
- Type: Mosque architecture
- Style: Adil Shahi
- Founder: Ali Farhad Khan
- Completed: c. 16th century

Specifications
- Minaret: Two
- Monuments: Two (Ali Farhad Khan and his wife)
- Inscriptions: One (maybe more)
- Materials: Stone

The Ali Farhad Khan's Mosque, also known as Kali Masjid, is a mosque and dargah, located in Aland, in the state of Karnataka, India. The mosque structure is a state protected monument.

== Description ==
The mosque is built in the Adil Shahi style, during the reign of the Sultanate of Bijapur. It was commissioned by Ali Farhad Khan, a brother of the general Afzal Khan.

=== Exterior ===
The mosque stands atop a rectangular plinth that is 2.29 metres (7 ft 6 in) high. The plinth is 24.49 metres (80 ft 4 in) long and 16.92 metres (55 ft 6 in) wide. It is accessible through a portal in the middle of the northern side, reached by a flight of eleven steps. The mosque is located at the western end of a courtyard, paved with stone slabs. Opposite the mosque stands a large masonry well, as well as two raised platforms – a dargah – containing the tombs of Ali Farhad Khan and his wife.

The mosque is built out of stone masonry, and the façade has three arched entrances opening out into the eastern courtyard. Each arch has a span of 2.51 metres (8 ft 3 in), and there is a Persian inscription above the central arch. The inscription, written in the Naskh script, notes that Ali Farhad Khan built the mosque, but does not give the date of its construction. Above the arches, a chajja rests on carved brackets. Finally, a parapet runs across the length of the façade, interspersed with small turrets.

The façade is flanked by two identical octagonal minarets, each approximately 9.1 metres (30 ft) high and 3.7 metres (12 ft) in girth, resting on square pedestals. Four ornamental bands are placed at equal intervals on each minaret. Each minaret is topped with an orb, resting on a disc of carved lotus petals, upon which is a stone finial.

An arcade consisting of nineteen arches runs across each of the northern, southern, and western walls. Two turrets are situated on the corners of the rear wall.

=== Interior ===
The prayer hall is 9.37 metres (30 ft 9 in) long and 6.1 metres (20 ft) wide. The mihrab (prayer-niche) in the center of the western wall is carved out of black stone. It is flanked by two smaller niches, which have a black stone outline. The basmala is carved over the prayer-niche. The floor is paved with slabs of grey stone.

== See also ==
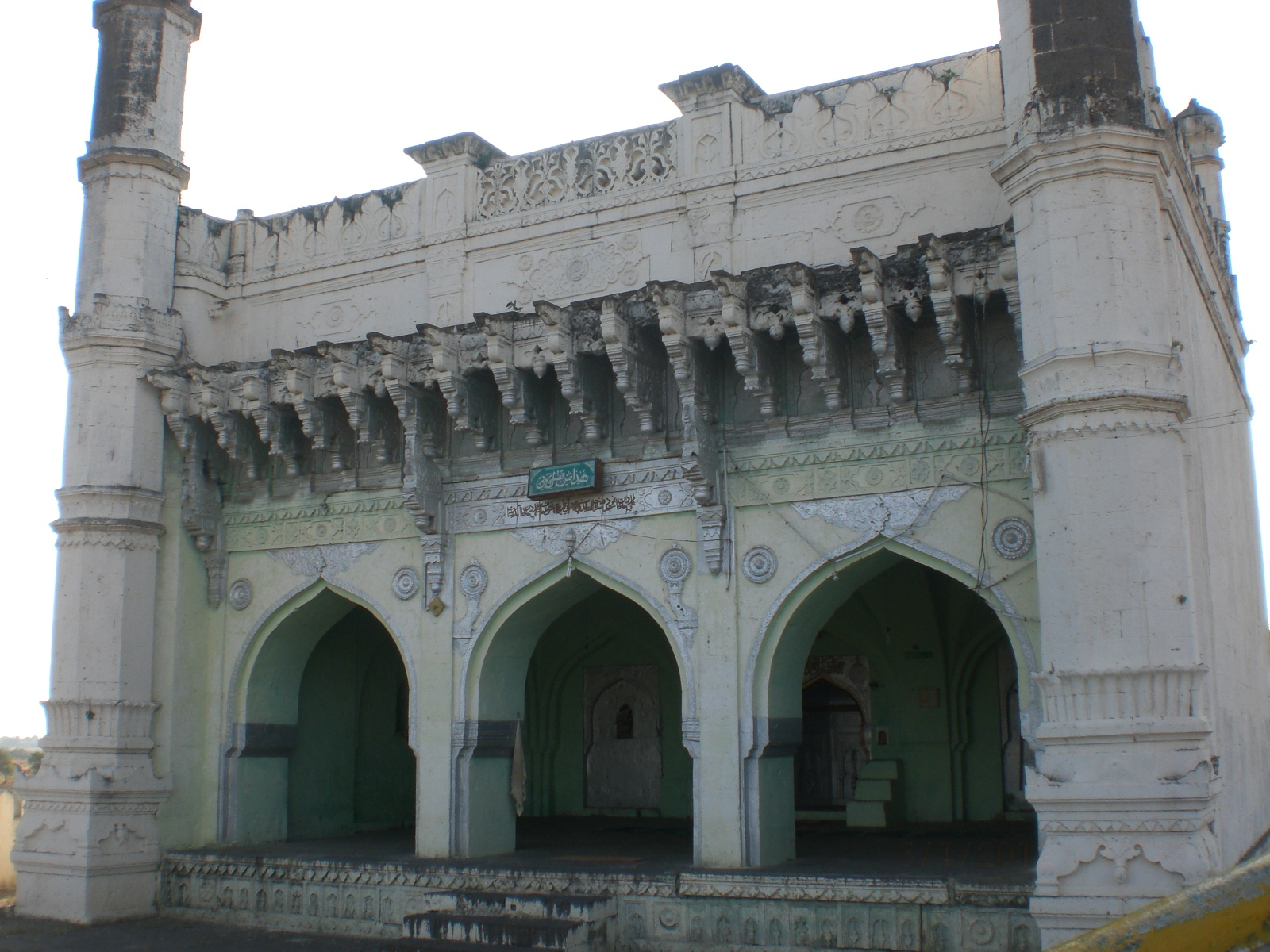
The mosque façade contains three arched entrances, and is flanked by two minarets

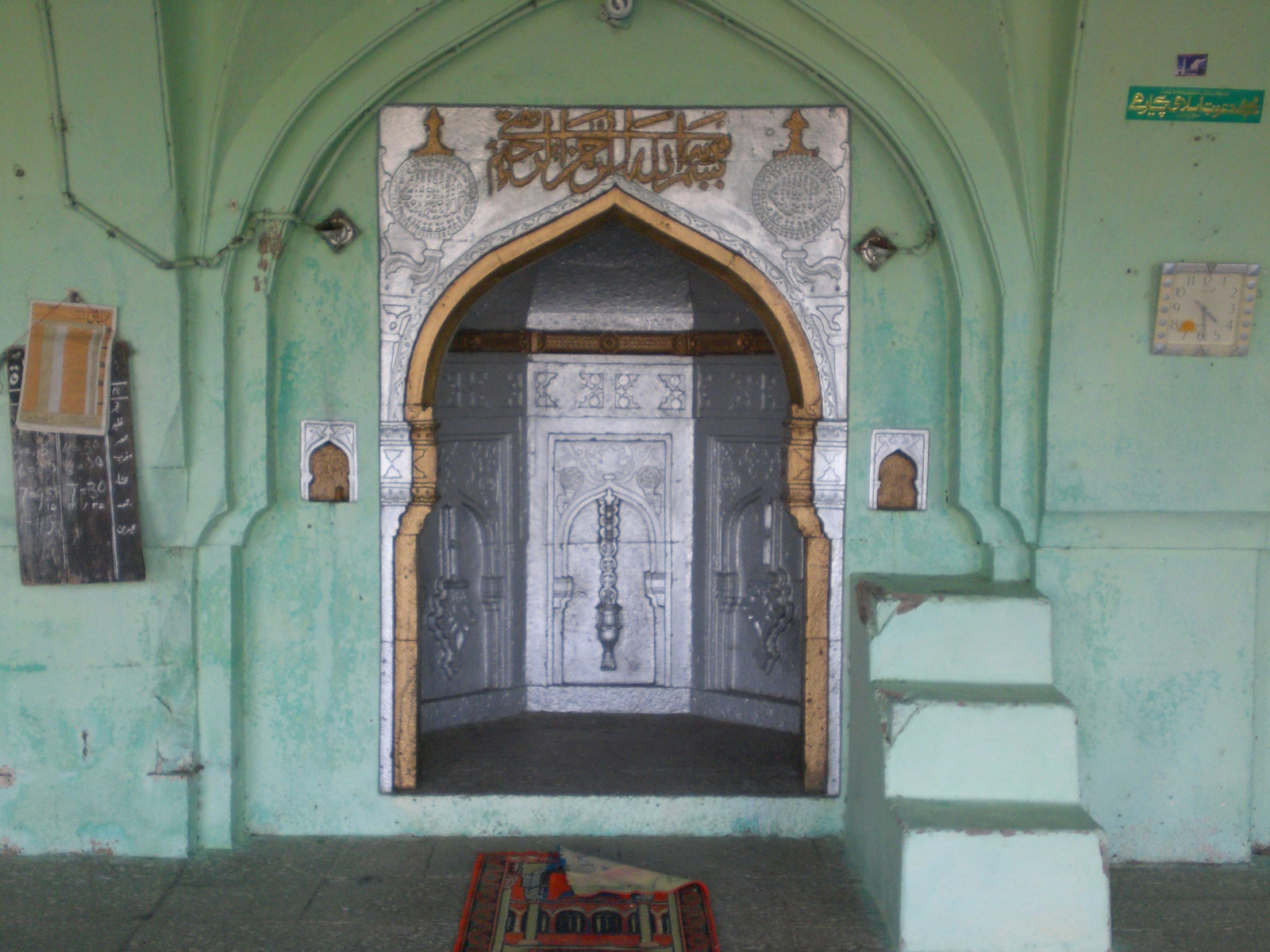
The mihrab in the center of the western wall

- Islam in India
- List of mosques in India
