= Group of temples at Magadi, Karnataka =

Ranganatha Swamy and Someshwara Magadi town
- Hindu temple
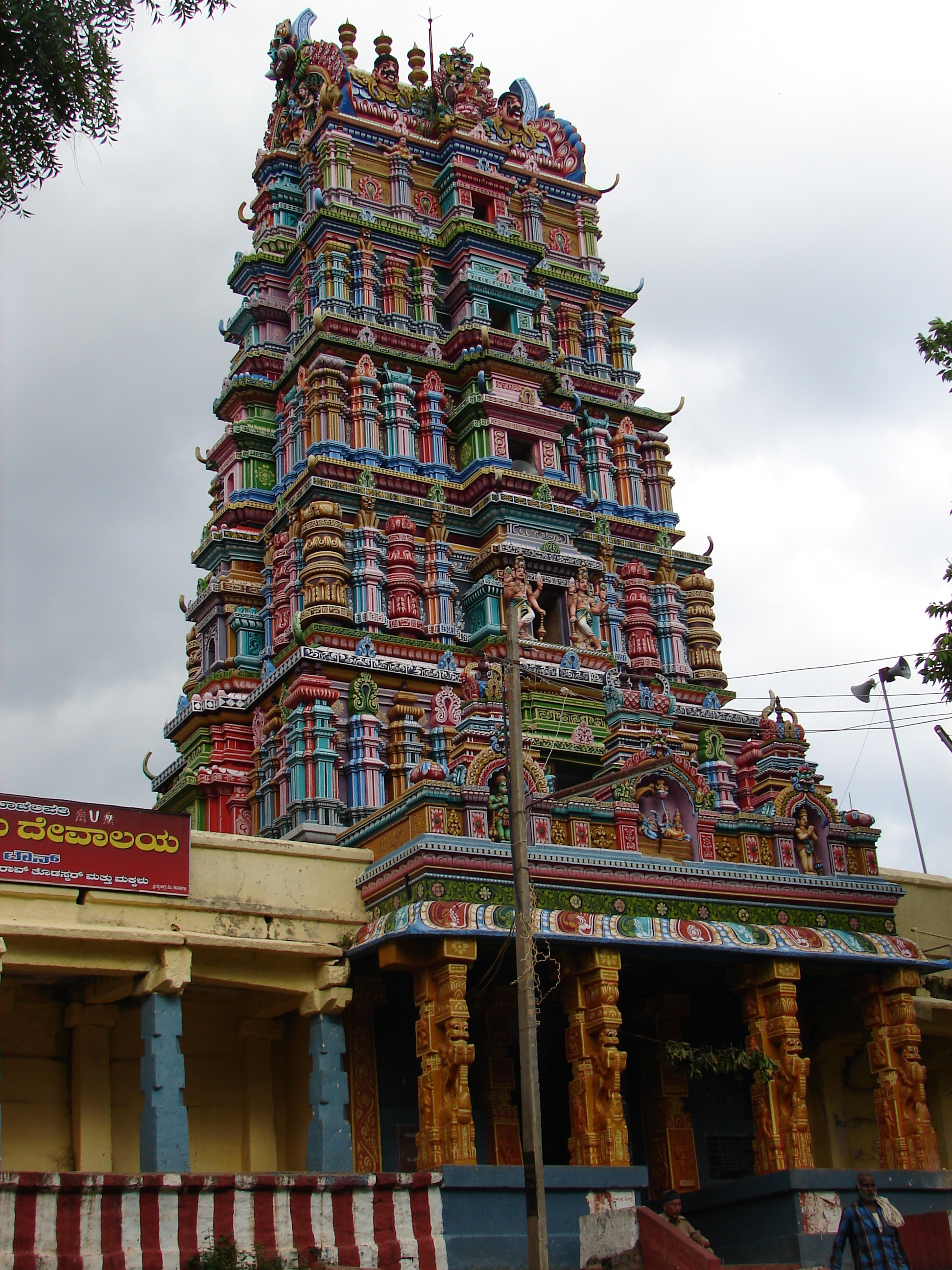
- Ranganatha temple at Magadi in Ramanagara district
- Nickname: magadi ranganatha swamy
- Interactive map of Ranganatha Swamy and Someshwara
- Country: India
- State: Karnataka
- District: Bengaluru South

Languages
  - Official: Kannada
- Time zone: UTC+5:30 (IST)

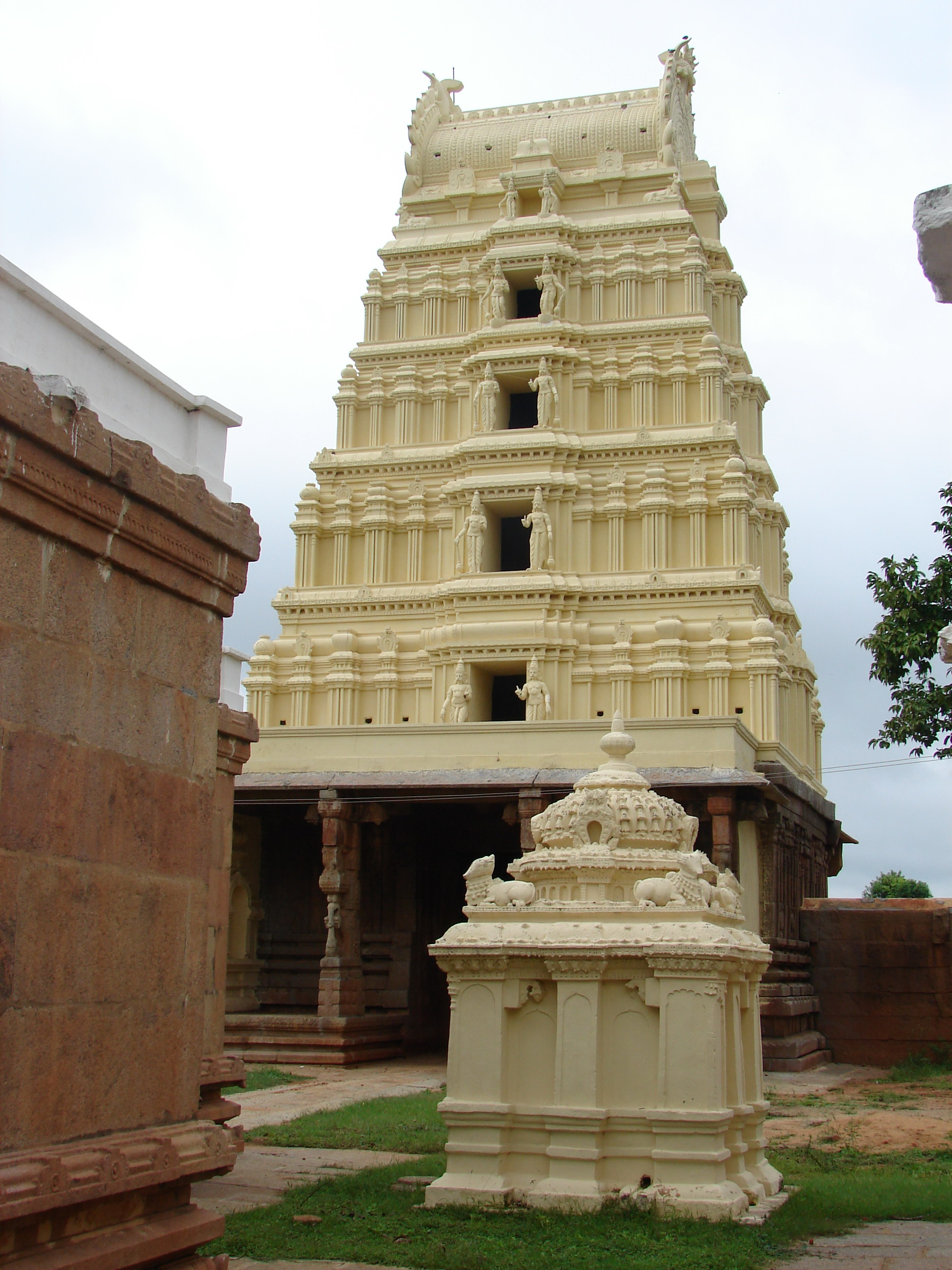
The Someshwara temple at Magadi

The Ranganatha Swamy and the Someshwara temples are located in the historic town of Magadi, about 41 km from Bangalore, the capital of the Indian state of Karnataka. These temples are protected monuments under the Karnataka state division of the Archaeological Survey of India.

== History ==
Magadi was first founded by the Chola dynasty around 1139 A.D. during their rule over the region. Magadi is the birthplace of Kempe Gowda, the Vijayanagara chieftain who founded Bangalore in the 16th century. Kempe Gowda and the chiefs who followed him built many architectural temples here.

=== Ranganatha temple ===
The presiding deity of the temple is lord Vishnu in his standing posture, similar to the one in Tirupati. The name of this temple is actually Paschima Venkatachalapthi temple as the presiding deity faces west. The area in which the temple is located is called Tirumale. However nowadays it is more popular as Ranganatha temple due to the presence of a small image of Rangatha on the temple wall which is believed to be growing in size every year. According to the priest of the temple, The sanctum of the Ranganatha temple was first consecrated in early 12th century by the Chola ruler and the temple has undergone renovations and expansion since. Based on an inscription on a Garuda sthamba (Garuda pillar) in front of the temple, the tall decorative Gopurams (towers) were added by the famous Vijayanagara Empire King Krishnadeva Raya in 1524 A.D. Contributions were also made by the Mysore regent Tipu Sultan; and the Maharaja of Mysore, Jayachamaraja Wodeyar. The Ranganatha temple complex consists of several shrines which includes sanctums for the Hindu deities Rama, Sita, Anjaneya, Lakshmi, Venugopala Krishna and Ranganatha (a form of the Hindu god Vishnu). Legend has it that the main deity (Ranganatha) was installed by Sage Mandavya lending the location the name "Mandavya Kshetra" (abode of Manavya). The pillars in the temple have attractive sculptures in relief. On either side of the temple entrance are two large colorful images of elephants.

=== Someshwara temple ===
According to the noted epigraphist and historian B. Lewis Rice, the Someshwara temple was built by Kempe Gowda II after coming to power in 1569 A.D. However, there is another view that the temple was actually built by his descendant Kempavira Gowda III in 1712 A.D. Notable structures in the large temple complex include a spacious inner prakara (courtyard) with lofty towers and mantapas (halls) which are in a state of neglect. Pillar decor includes motifs of dancing girls, soldiers, birds, and animals such as lions in relief. The complex includes a small shrine for Parvati, consort of the Hindu god Shiva. A short distance from the complex is a mantapa for Nandi, the vehicle of the god Shiva.

== Gallery ==
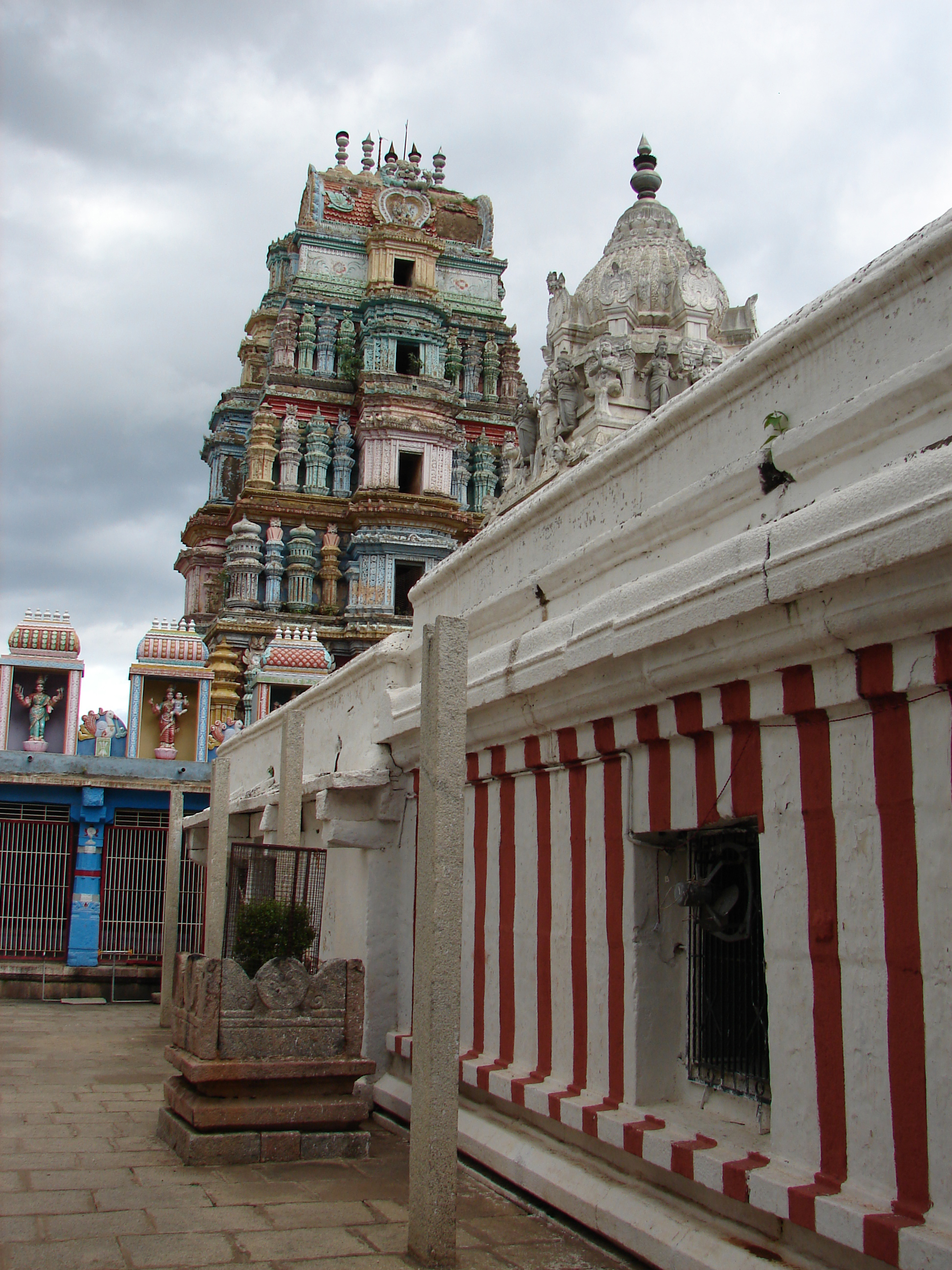
View from the rear of the Ranganatha Swamy temple, Magadi

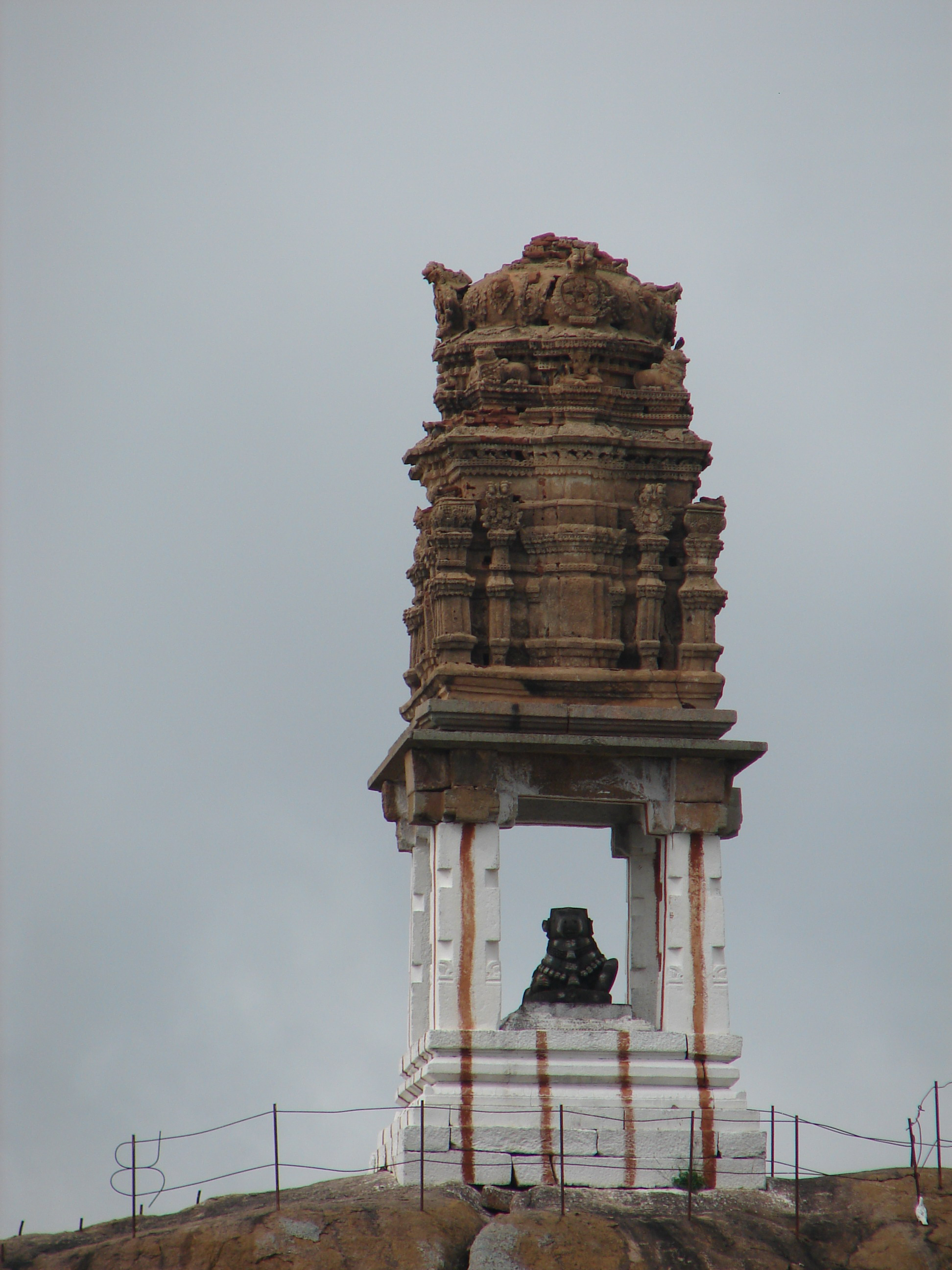
Nandi (bull) mantapa viewed from the Someshwara temple complex, Magadi

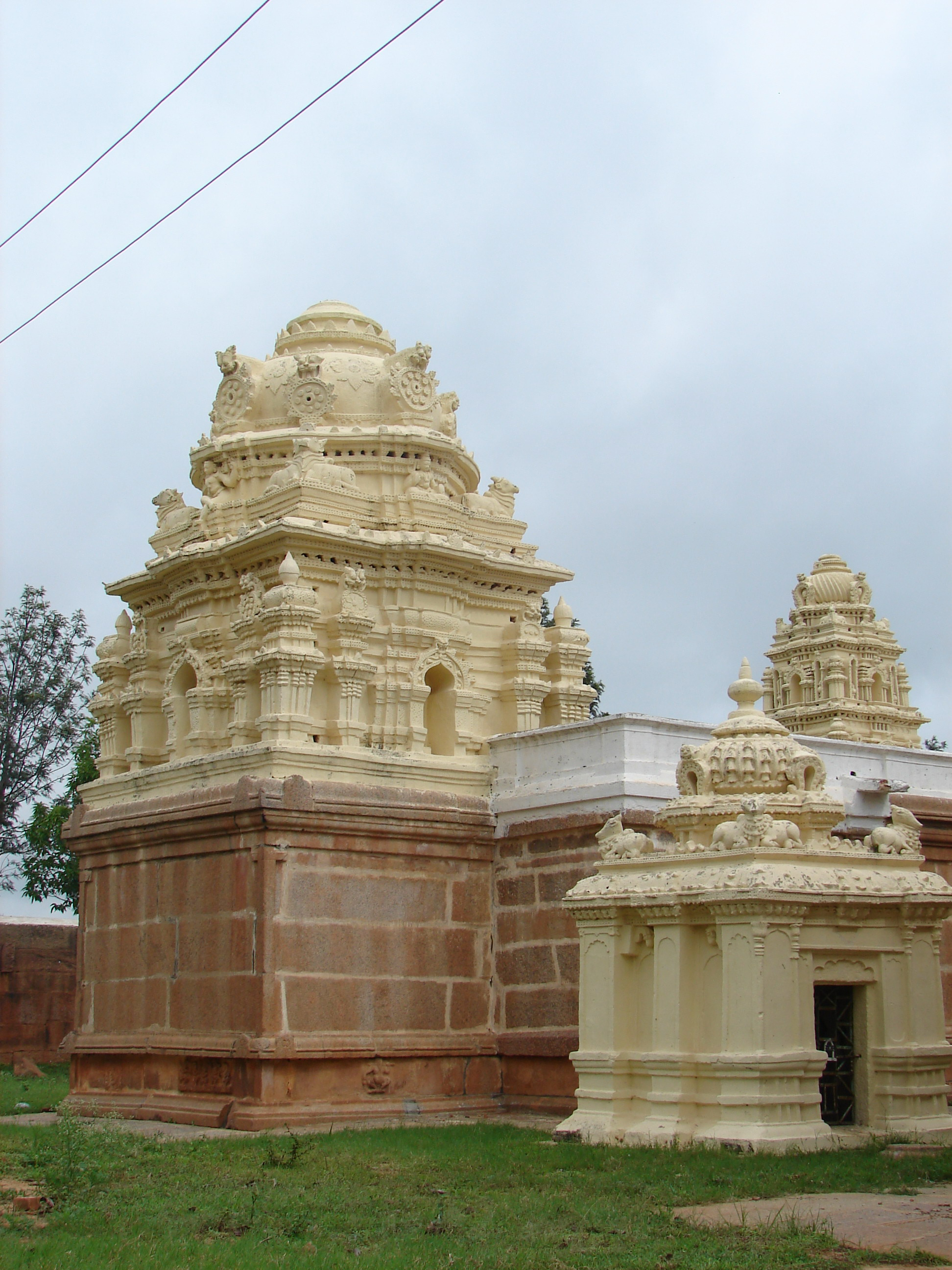
Shrine of Parvati in the Someshwara temple complex, Magadi

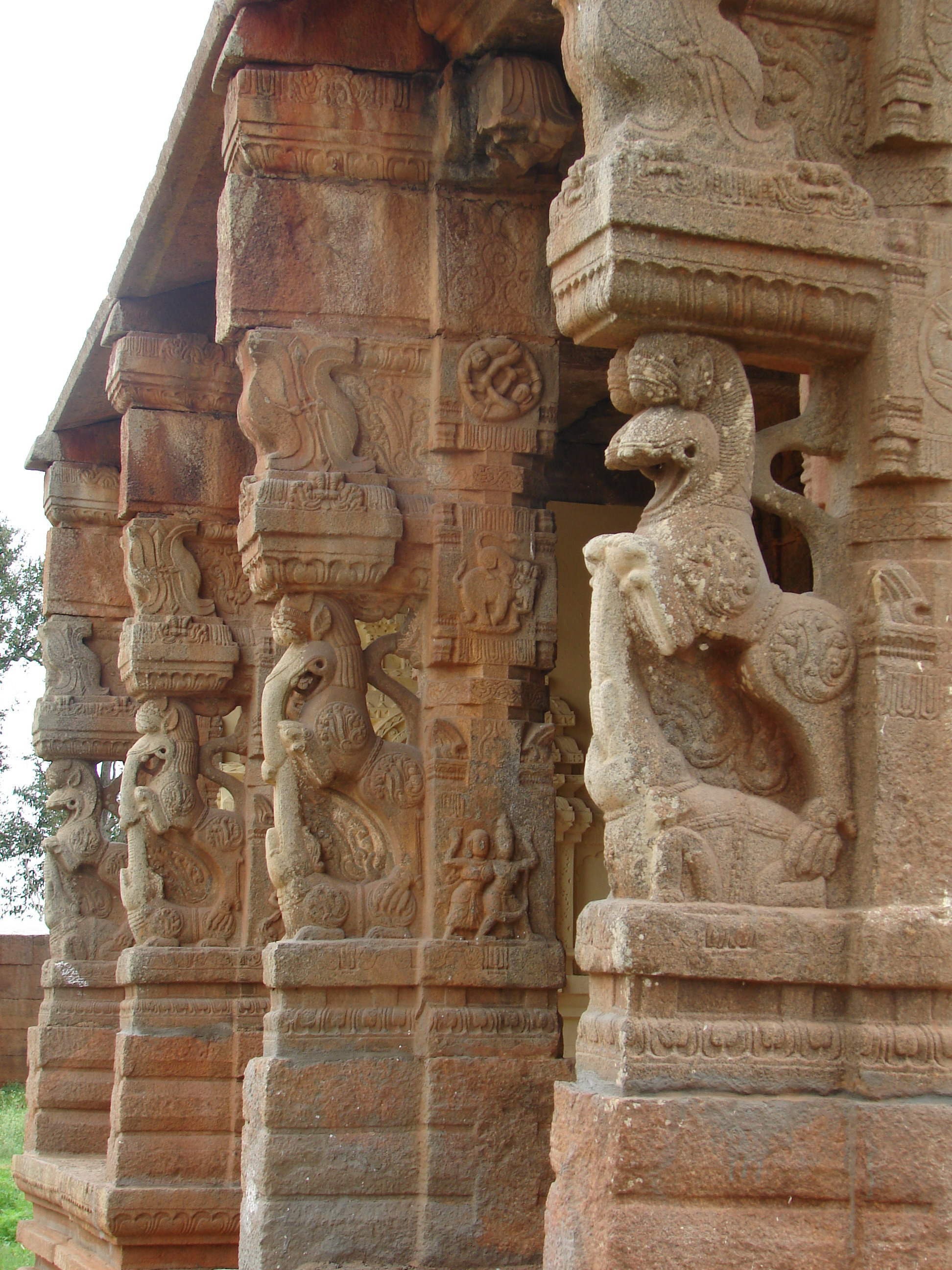
Yali pillars under the Someshwara temple gopura (tower), Magadi
