= Chaubara (watchtower) =

Coordinates: 17°54′42″N 77°31′49″E

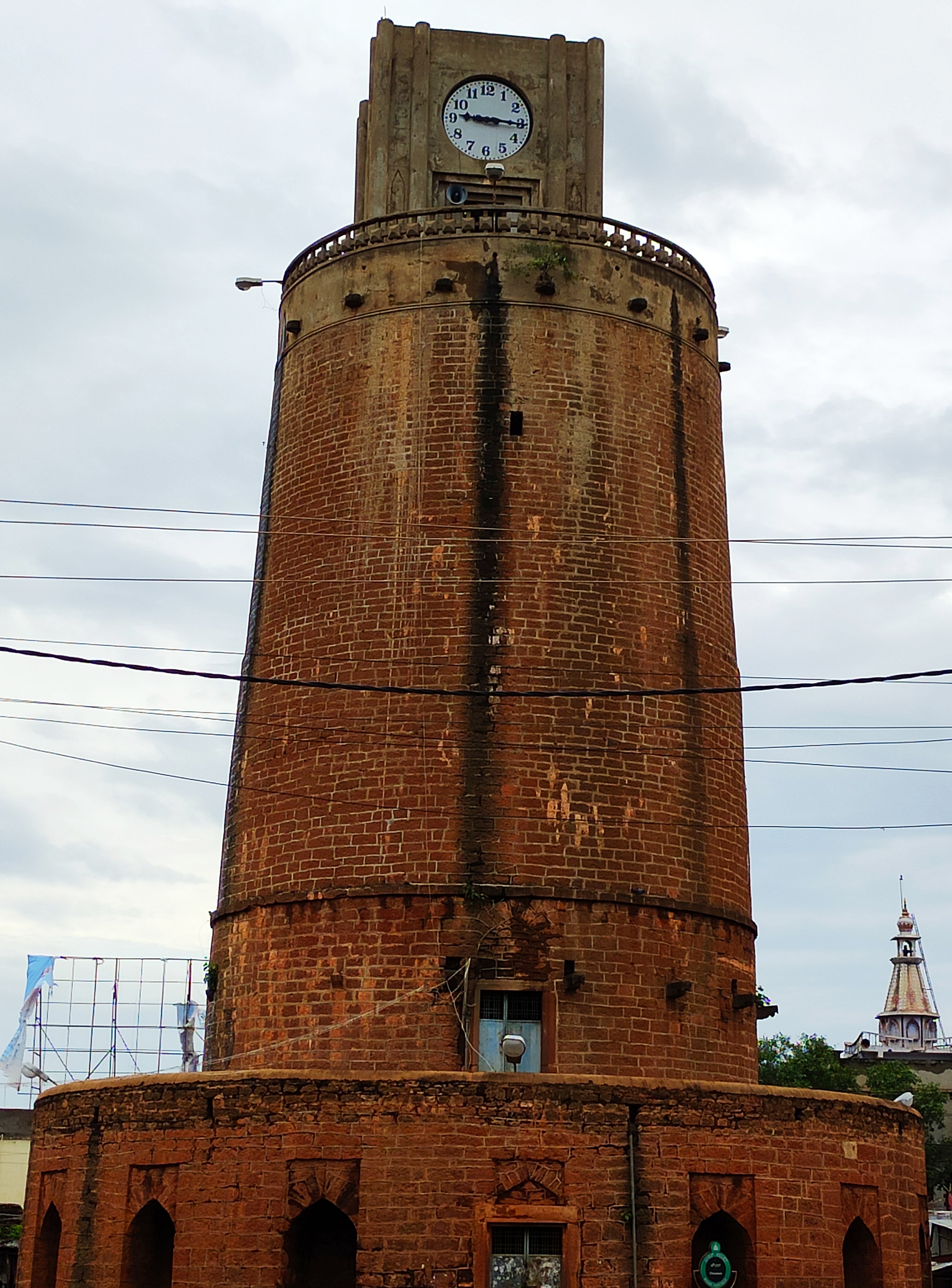

General information
- Location: Bidar

Height
- Height: 71 feet (22 m)

Chaubara, also spelt Choubara, is a historic watchtower located in Bidar, in the Indian state of Karnataka. It is listed as a state protected monument.

== History ==
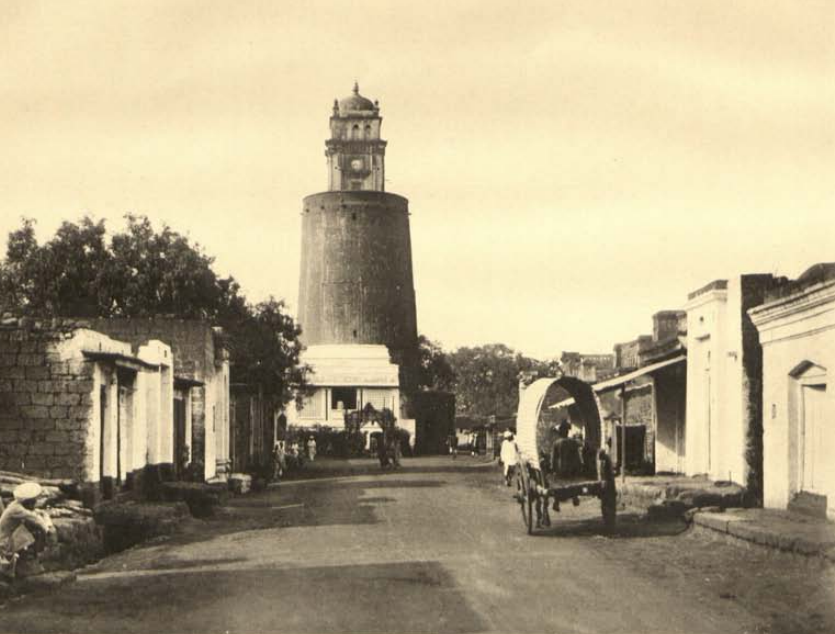
Chaubara, c. 1933

The tower dates back to the Bahmani period. It was probably built by Ahmad Shah, along with other fortifications of the city. It seems to have been used as a watchtower, as it offers a view of the entire plateau and lowlands around it for several miles. It might also have been used as a central tribunal for punishments of criminals, and promulgation of royal decrees.

During the British period, a police station was built adjoining the tower on its northern side. However, it was removed upon the recommendations of the archaeological department.

== Description ==
It is situated at the intersection of the two main streets of Bidar, which run from north to south, and east to west. It is a cylindrical tower, tapering upwards, and built entirely out of black trap masonry laid in lime. It is about 71 feet (22 m) tall, thus commanding a view of the entire plateau and the lowlands surrounding it, far beyond the town.

The tower has a circular base, measuring about 180 feet (55 m) in perimeter, and having a height of about 16.75 feet (5.11 m). Arched niches are built into the base along its entire circumference, which may have been occupied by guards or may have been intended for pedestrians to take shelter in.

An entrance to the base is provided on the eastern side. From there, a staircase leads to the top of the base. On this level, in the northern side, is a door which leads to a winding staircase that ascends to the top of the tower. This staircase comprises eighty steps. The tower has four rectangular openings to let in light and air. A parapet about 3.5 feet (1.1 m) tall rises above the summit.
