= Chor Gumbad =

Coordinates: 17°20′54″N 76°48′40″E

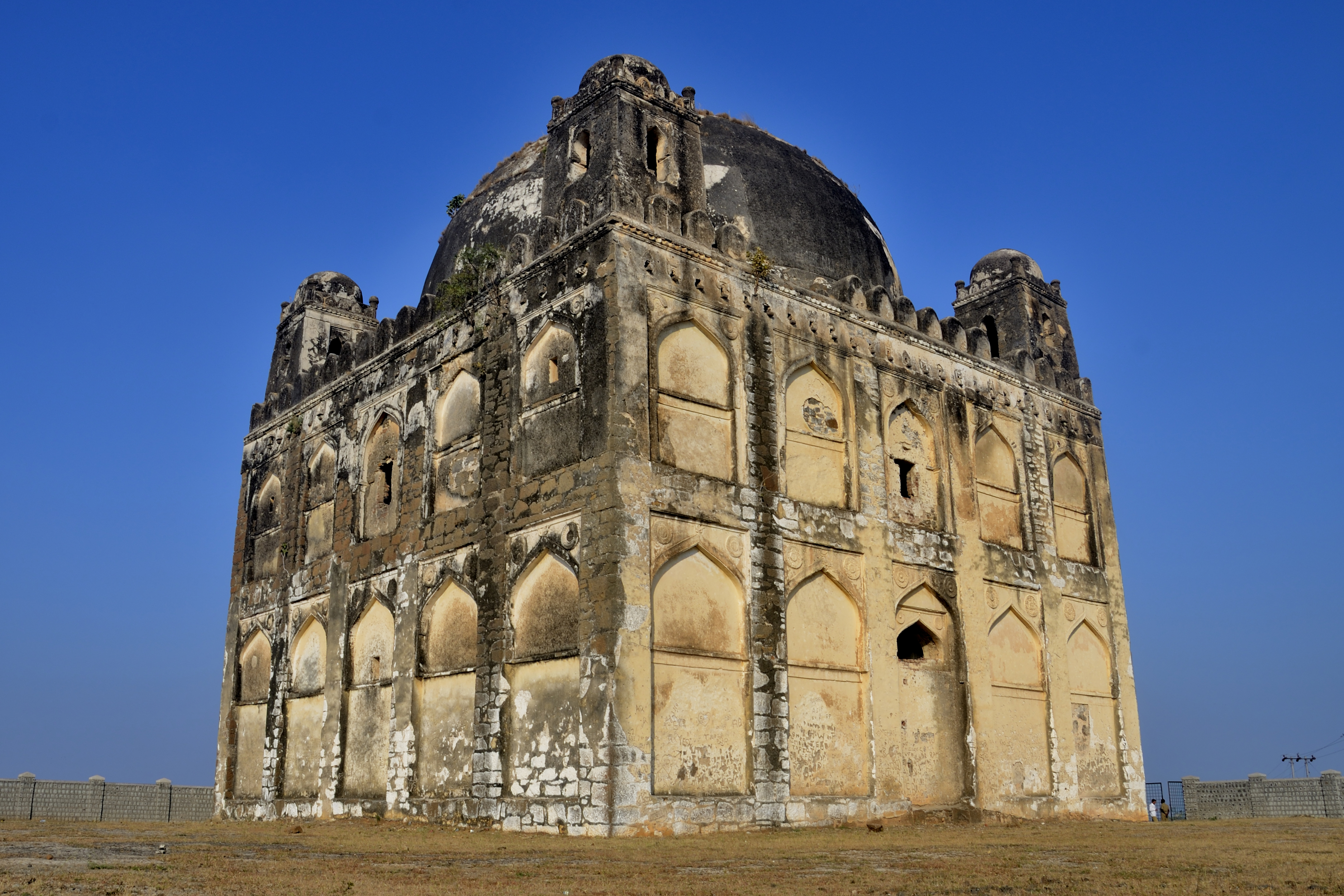
- Interactive map of the Chor Gumbad area

General information
- Location: Kalaburagi
- Year built: 15th century

Chor Gumbad, Gulbarga is a domed building in Gumbad, Kalaburagi. It is listed as a state protected monument.

== Etymology ==
The Chor Gumbad (lit. Dome of thieves), as it is colloquially known, might have been named as it came to have been occupied by thieves.

Another name for the building is the Shor Gumbad (lit. Dome of noise), also spelt Shor Gumbaz. This is ascribed to the supposed use of the building as a watchtower. As the soldiers deployed on the turrets would sound an alarm upon spotting any enemy army approaching, which could be heard from a distance.

== History ==
The building dates back to the Bahmani period. There are no graves within the building, and it may have been built as a commemorative monument by Ahmad Shah to mark his victory over Firuz Shah and ascension to the throne in 1422.

== Description ==
It is situated on a hillock, to the west of Gulbarga Fort. The square-shaped building is surmounted by a massive dome. This dome rises to a height of 100 feet. At four corners of the roof are turrets which are crowned by kiosks. A five feet tall parapet rises above the structure. The walls have arches carved into them, with each wall having ten arches arranged in two stories. There is only one entrance, at the Eastern end.

Internally, the tomb measures 74' by 66'. A corridor beneath the dome has arched windows covered by jali screens. This was probably provided to allow elite women of the zenana to observe events while maintaining their privacy as required by purdah.
