= Savadatti Fort =

Fort in Karnataka, India

- Savadatti, Karnataka, India
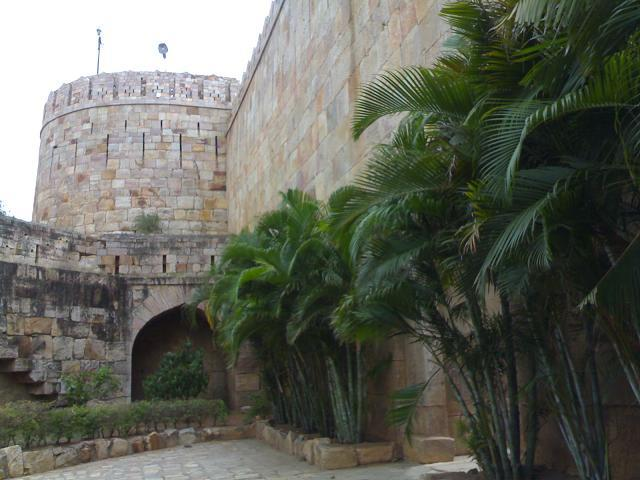
- Entrance view of the Savadatti fort

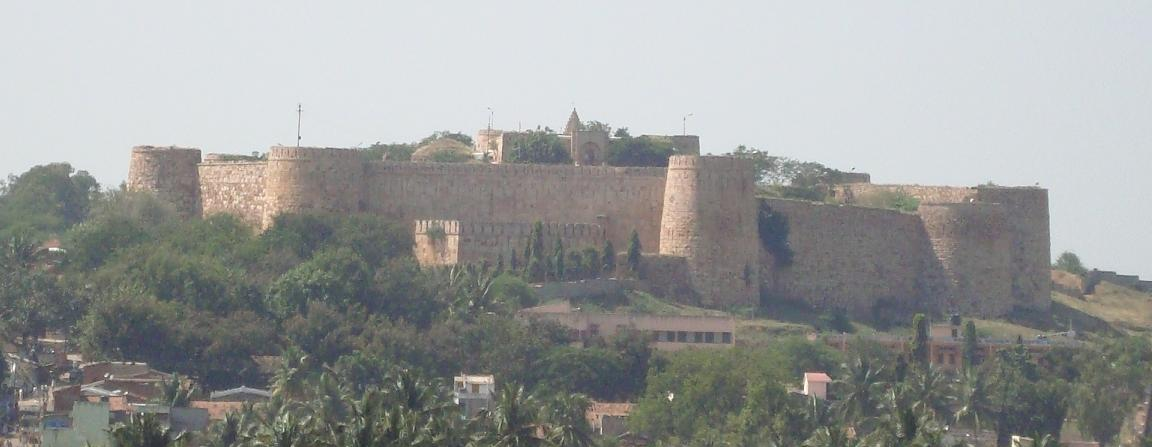
- A full view of the Savadatti fort

Site information
- Type: Fort
- Owner: Jayappa Desai
- Open to the public: Yes
- Condition: Restored

Location
- Coordinates: 15.76°N 75.11°E

Site history
- Built: 1734
- In use: 18th century

The Savadatti Fort, also known as Saundatti Fort located in the western part of Savadatti town (which is also known as Saundatti or Sughandavarti, Savandavatti, Savadavatti, meaning fragrant city) in the Indian state of Karnataka is an irregular shaped military structure built in the 18th century over a small hill. A smaller fort within the main fort houses the Kadasiddheshwara temple.

== Geography ==
Located in the Savadatti town, on its western part, the fort is constructed over a small hill of stand-alone formation, which has flanks of exposed rocks. The hill is covered with a thick forest of prickly pear. It is approachable by road from Savadatti right up to the main gate. It is in the Belgaum district of Karnataka and is 83 kilometres (52 mi) distance from Belgaum.

== History ==
The town in which the fort lies was ruled by the Ratta dynasty from 9th to 13th centuries, prior to shifting the capital to Belgaum. In 1730, the Savanur Nawab gifted Savadatti along with Dharwar village to the Naralgund Desai who built the fort in 1734. It is also said that the fort was built by Jayappa Desai of the Navalgund Sirasangi Sansthan between 1743 and 1751. When the fort came under the control of Hyder Ali of Mysore, the Desai declared his allegiance to him.

== Features ==
The fort, built on a rising ground, is in the shape of a nine-sided polygon. The east-facing main entry gate is approachable by road. From the road, access to the main gate is steep. From this gate, further inwards to another gate, is also a steep climb over a stairway of about 30 steps. Each segment of the fort walls are 120 feet (37 m) in length, with heights ranging from 24 to 60 feet (7.3 to 18.3 m), and are made of large, hewn stones. The fort is fortified with eight bastions. The fort measures 325 feet (99 m) in the north–south direction and 450 feet (140 m) in the east–west direction. The fort is surrounded by a moat. The main gate of the fort is further fortified with two posterns or sally ports on its northern and southern flanks. The ramparts of the fort are narrow parapets of stone with loop holes; these are well protected with revetments. In the interior part of the fort, at the higher end, there is a new temple dedicated to Hanuman, and below this temple a beacon light has been installed.

Within the fort stands a smaller fort, square in shape, fortified with corner towers or bastions. The entrance gate to this fort is well built and is accessed via a flight of steps. The ramparts of this fort are built with stone pillars that form a passage. There is a moat surrounding this fort which is in need of repairs. Within the fort lies a large pond surrounded by high parapet walls and a well protected gate, which was the source of good quality water. The Kadisiddeshwara Temple stands in the center of this fort. The eaves of the roof inside the prakara (the walls that surround the temple) feature a row of more than 200 ornamental carvings in geometric designs, some of them painted.

== Bibliography ==
- California, University of (1884). Gazetteer of the Bombay Presidency:Belgaum. Government Central Press.
- Vijaisri, Priyadarshini (1 January 2004). Recasting the Devadasi: Patterns of Sacred Prostitution in Colonial South India. Kanishka Publishers, Distributors. ISBN 978-81-7391-644-1.
