= List of Monuments of National Importance in Karnataka =

This is a list of Monuments of National Importance (ASI) as officially recognized by and available through the website of the Archaeological Survey of India in the Indian state Karnataka. The monument identifier is a combination of the abbreviation of the subdivision of the list (state, ASI circle) and the numbering as published on the website of the ASI. 506 Monuments of National Importance have been recognized by the ASI in Karnataka.Subsequently the Department of Archeology Museums and Heritage of Government of Karnataka has published a report which lists 609 Monuments of National Importance in Karnataka.

Heritage monuments in Karnataka is subdivided by the ASI into three circles: Bangalore, Hampi and Dharwad. The list for Dharwad is long, so it has been split up on a district basis.

== List of monuments of National importance ==
- Bangalore Circle
- Dharwad Circle is divided in the following districts:
  - Belgaum
  - Bidar
  - Bagalkot and Bijapur
  - Dharwad
  - Gulbarga
  - North Kanara
  - Raichur

== See also ==
- List of Monuments of National Importance in India for other Monuments of National Importance in India
- List of State Protected Monuments in Karnataka
