= Aland, Karnataka =

Aland
- City
- Aland
- Interactive map of Aland
- Coordinates: 17°34′N 76°34′E
- Country: India
- State: Karnataka
- District: Kalaburagi
- Vehicle registration: KA-32
- Website: www.alandatown.mrc.gov.in

Aland or Ālanda is a city and taluka in Kalaburagi district in the state of Karnataka, India. It is the headquarters of Aland Taluka. Aland was formed in 1952 as a town municipal council. It is 683 kilometres (424 mi) from the state capital Bengaluru, and 43 kilometres (27 mi) from district headquarters Kalaburagi. It shares a border with Maharashtra state and is also 85 kilometres (53 mi) from Sholapur.

== Geography ==
Aland is situated at coordinates 17°34′N 76°34′E, with an average elevation of 480 metres (1,570 ft) AMSL. The town covers an area of 8 square kilometres (3.1 sq mi).

Aland Taluk is bordered by Kalaburagi Taluk of Kalaburagi district to the east, Afzalpur Taluk of Kalaburagi district to the south, and Basavakalyan Taluk of Bidar district to the northwest.

Aland experiences a dry climate with low rainfall. A significant portion of the population lives in poverty. In recent years, a large number of residents have migrated to cities due to inadequate water supplies, limited educational facilities, and poor employment opportunities. Power shortages are also a serious issue in the area. Aland has witnessed a high number of farmer suicides. The lack of natural resources and educational opportunities has resulted in low industrialization and high unemployment rates. Aland ranks among the least productive tehsils in India, whether measured in terms of revenue, employment, malnutrition, industrial development, or agricultural development.

== Demographics ==
According to the 2011 India census, Aland had a population of 42,371. Males accounted for 51.6% of the population, while females accounted for 48.4%. Aland has a low literacy rate of 49.4%, which is lower than the national average of 59.5%. Among the population, 55% of males and 40% of females are literate.

Aland is home to several famous temples/Dargas where devotees can offer prayers and worship, including Siddharud Temple, Ladle Mashaq Darga, Markandey Temple, Hastamalik Temple, Hingulambika Temple, Chakri Katta, Eknath Temple, Mahadev Gundaga Temple, Chaudamma Temple, Sri Ram Temple, Hanuman Temple, Raghav Chetanya Temple, Digambar Jain Temple, and Mahadev Temple.

The primary language spoken in Aland is Kannada. Additionally, Marathi, Hindi, and Urdu are also spoken in the area.

== Facilities and structures ==
- Ali Farhad Khan's Mosque, a state protected monument
