= Kekkera =

Kekkera Kakkera
- Town
- Location in Karnataka, India Kekkera (India)
- Coordinates: 16°23′03″N 076°35′20″E
- Country: India
- State: Karnataka
- District: Yadgir
- Talukas: Shorapur

Government
  - Type: Panchayat raj
  - Body: Gram panchayat

Population (2001)
  - Total: 15,492

Languages
  - Official: Kannada
- Time zone: UTC+5:30 (IST)
- ISO 3166 code: IN-KA
- Vehicle registration: KA
- Website: karnataka.gov.in

Kakkera is a TMC in the southern state of Karnataka, India. Administratively, it is in the Shorapur taluka of Yadgir district in Karnataka state.

== Demographics ==
As of 2015 India census, Kakkera had a population of 35,492 with 18,345 males and 17,147 females.

== See also ==
- Yadgir
