= Mallur, Karnataka =

Mallur, Karnataka Dodda Mallur
- village
- Location in Karnataka, India Mallur, Karnataka (India)
- Coordinates: 12.647017°N 77.179844°E
- Country: India
- State: Karnataka
- District: Bengaluru South

Languages
  - Official: Kannada
- Time zone: UTC+5:30 (IST)
- Postal code: 562160

Mallur is a village in Channapatna Taluk in Bengaluru South district in the Indian state of Karnataka. Mallur is located on the banks of the river Kanva. The village is famous for its temples of Sri Ramaprameya Swamy, Aravindavalli and Ambegalu Navaneeta Krishna (crawling Krishna) This temple was built by the Great Chola dynasty, South Indian Tamil rulers maybe in the 12th century. It is approximately 60 km from Bangalore in Bangalore-Mysore state highway. It is roughly 3 km from Channapatna.

The idol of Ambegalu Navaneetha Krishna (crawling Krishna with butter in hand), is believed to be the only deity of Lord Sri Krishna in this pose. This idol was installed by Vyasaraja (a.k.a. Vyasatirtha), who was a prominent saint of Dvaita Vedanta. The famous Kriti (musical composition or song) "Jagadodharana Adisidale Yashode" was composed by most prominent composer of Carnatic music Purandaradasa in appreciation of the beauty of this idol.

Dodda Mallur is located between Bangalore and Mysore. Its 60 km from Bangalore and approximately 80 km from Mysore. It is 3 km from Channapatna.

Transport: You can reach Channapatna by Bus and Train. From Channapatna, local autorickshaws and private vehicles transport travelers to Doddamallur.

== History ==
History has it that the temple of Aprameya was built in the 11th century by Chola Emperor Rajendra Simha. The temple is named after the Chola general Aprameya.

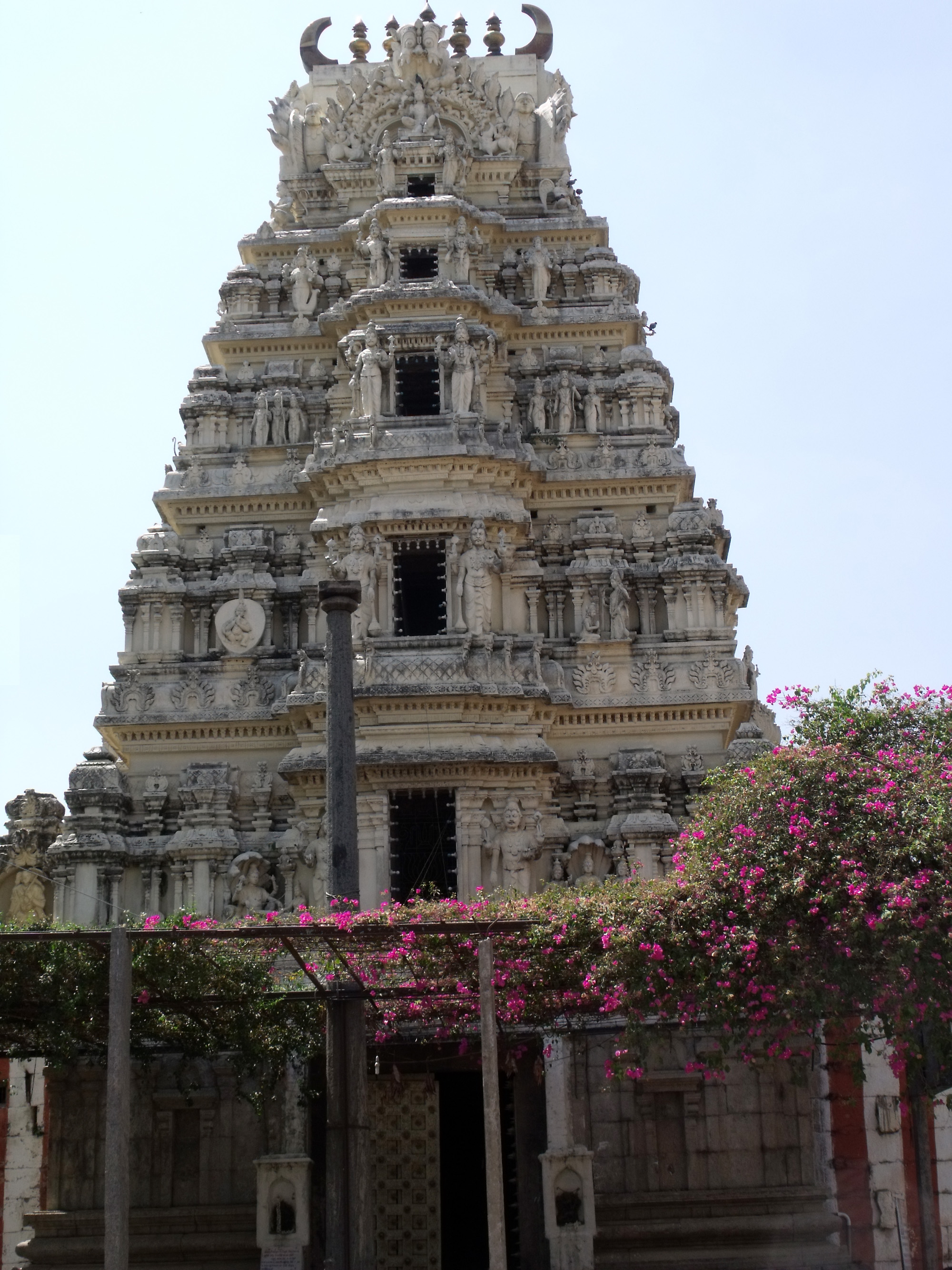
Main entrance of the Aprameya Swamy Temple

This place is on the banks of river kanva and river bed constitutes the major portion on this village, hence this place is called Maraloor (ಮರಳೂರು) Manalur, While “Manal-ur” of the Mahabharata is purely a Tamil name meaning “Sandy, Sand City, later transformed to Mallur in Kannada. Legends says Lord Aprameya swamy temple has been built on this sand has no strong foundations, similar to the Brihadisvara Temple at Thanjavur.

== Geography ==
Dodda Mallur is located at 12.647017°N 77.179844°E. It has an average elevation of 739 metres (2424 feet).

== Events ==
The Brahmotsavam of Sri Ramaprameya Swamy happens to fall in the months of April/May of every year. The architecture of this temple is built in such a way that for this part of the year the sunrays at sunrise fall directly on the sanctum sanctorum (Garbhagudi of Sri Aprameya Swamy).
