= State Protected Monuments of India =

This article contains lists of State Protected Monuments of India.

== Table of monuments ==
The State Protected Monuments are designated by the Archaeological Survey of India (ASI). The state governments of India are authorised to maintain, protect and promote the State Protected Monuments.

State Protected Monuments designated by the ASI
States		No. of Monuments
Andhra Pradesh	List	177
Arunachal Pradesh	List	7
Assam	List	96
Bihar	List	30
Chhattisgarh	List	58
Goa	List	51
Gujarat	List	366
Haryana	List	23
Himachal Pradesh	List	5
Jharkhand	List	3
Karnataka	List	747
Kerala	List	116
Madhya Pradesh	List	326
Maharashtra	List	244
Manipur	List	49
Meghalaya	List	4
Mizoram	List	53
Nagaland	–	0
Odisha	List	218
Punjab	List	63
Rajasthan	List	227
Sikkim	–	0
Tamil Nadu	List	109
Telangana	List	323
Tripura	–	0
Uttar Pradesh	List	143
Uttarakhand	List	21
West Bengal	List	106
Union territories		No. of Monuments
Andaman and Nicobar Islands	–	0
Chandigarh	–	0
Dadra and Nagar Haveli and Daman and Diu	–	0
Delhi	List	33
Jammu and Kashmir	List	28
Ladakh	–	0
Lakshadweep	–	0
Puducherry	–	0
Total:		4,134

== See also ==
- Monuments of National Importance of India
- National Geological Monuments of India
- List of World Heritage Sites in India
- List of Water Heritage Sites in India
- List of rock-cut temples in India
- List of forts in India
- List of museums in India
