= Kali Masjid =

Kali Masjid (Black Mosque) may refer to several mosques in India:

- Kali Masjid, Aland, or Ali Farhad Khan's Mosque, in Karnataka
- Kali Masjid, Bidar, in Karnataka
- Kali Masjid, Hyderabad, in Telangana
- Kali Masjid, Jalna, in Maharashtra
- Kali Masjid, Agra, or mosque of the Taj Mahal, in Uttar Pradesh

== See also ==
- Kalan Masjid, a mosque in Old Delhi, India
