= Lal Masjid =

Lal Masjid or Red Mosque may refer to:

- Jami Ul-Alfar Mosque or Red Mosque, Pettah, Sri Lanka
- Lal Masjid, Delhi, India
- Lal Masjid, Islamabad, Pakistan
  - Siege of Lal Masjid, 2007
  - 2008 Lal Masjid bombing
- Lal Masjid, Tijara, Red Mosque
- Red Mosque, Berat, Albania
- Red Mosque, Kandahar, Afghanistan
- Red Mosque of Panjunan, West Java, Indonesia
