= List of mosques in India =

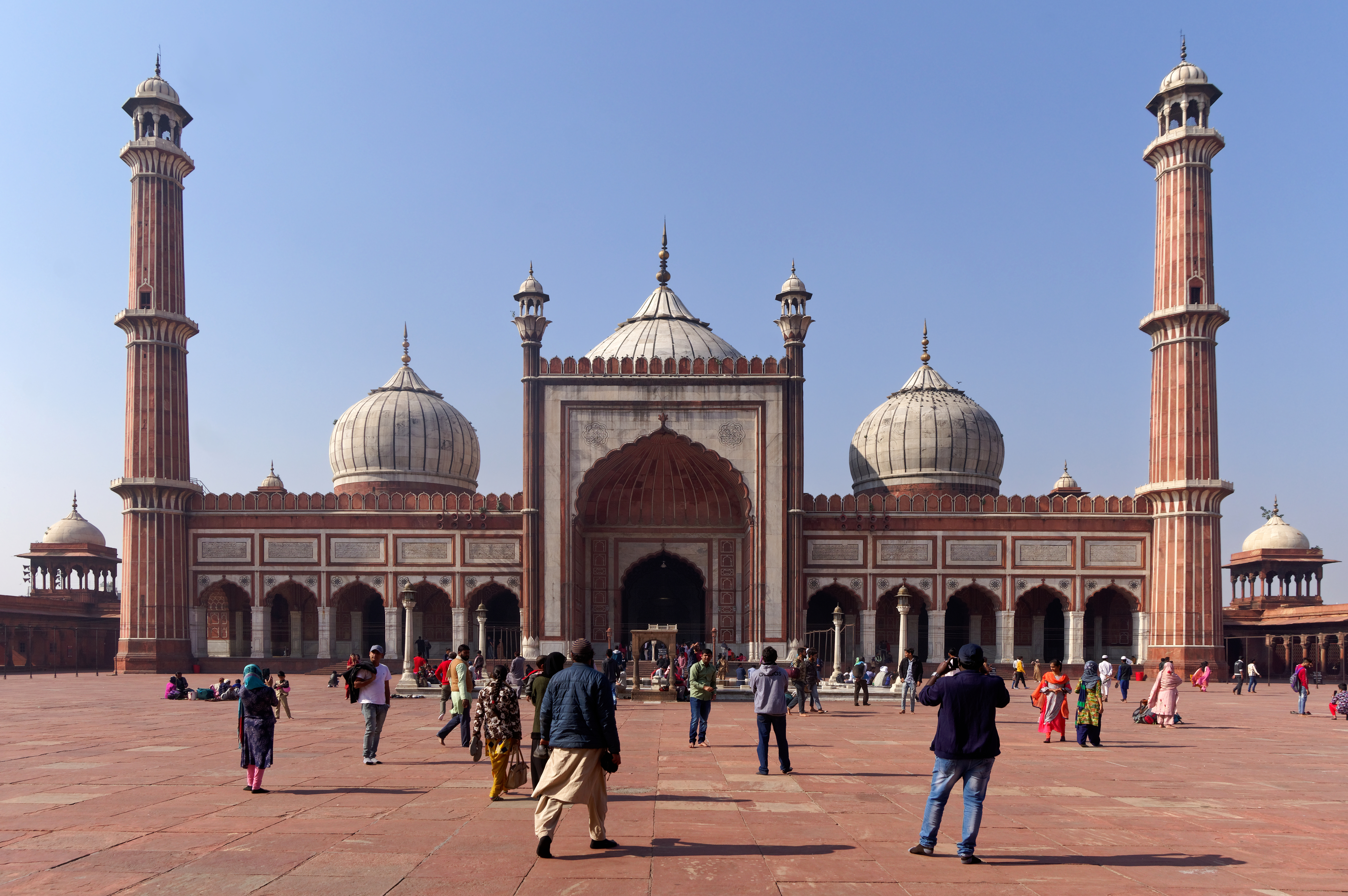
Jama Masjid, Delhi

This is a list of notable mosques in India, organised by state or union territory. As of 2021, India had more than 55,000 active mosques and had the third largest Muslim population in the world. In 2024, there were roughly 300,000 mosques in India, putting India second position in country with most mosques.

== Andaman and Nicobar Islands ==
Name	Location	Image	Year	Religious branch	Remarks
Delanipur Jama Mosque	Port Blair				

== Andhra Pradesh ==
Name	Location	Image	Year	Religious branch	Remarks
Shahi Jamia Mosque	Adoni		1662	Sunni Barelvi	

== Assam ==
Name	Location	Image	Year	Religious branch	Remarks
Panbari Mosque	Dhubri		c. 16th century		Built by either the Sultan of Bengal, Alauddin Husain Shah or Mir Jumla II, a Mughal governor
Puranigudam Jame Masjid	Puranigudam		1824		

== Bihar ==
Name	Location	Image	Year	Religious branch	Remarks
Pathar Ki Masjid	Patna		1621 CE		Built by Parviz Mirza, son of 4th Mughal Emperor, Jahangir
Sher Shah Suri Mosque	Patna		1545 CE	Sunni	Built by Sher Shah Suri, the founder and 1st ruler of Sur Empire, to commemorate his reign
Chatta Masjid	Gaya			Sunni	
Noori Masjid	Patna		1913	Sunni	It was established by the prominent philanthropist, lawyer, and zamindar Syed Noorul Huda

== Chhattisgarh ==
Name	Location	Image	Year	Religious branch	Remarks
Jama Masjid	Bhilai		1967	Sunni Deobandi	First mosque in the world built in the shape of Arabic word Yā Allāh

== Delhi ==
Name	Location	Image	Year	Religious branch	Remarks
Fatehpuri Masjid	Delhi		1650 CE	Sunni Barelvi	Built by Fatehpuri Begum, one of the wives of 5th Mughal Emperor, Shah Jahan; Mufti Mukarram Ahmad is the chief mufti and imam of the mosque
Jama Masjid	Delhi		1656 CE	Sunni	Also known as Masjid-i-Jehān-Numā, roughly translating to "mosque commanding the view of the world" in Persian and Urdu; Built by Shah Jahan
Kalan Masjid	Old Delhi		1387 CE		One of the seven mosques built by Khan-i-Jahan Tilangani
Khirki Mosque	South Delhi		1354 CE		Built by Khan-i-Jahan Junan Shah, the prime minister of Feroz Shah Tughlaq, of the Tughlaq dynasty; A Monument of National Importance; no longer used as a mosque
Khairul Manazil	New Delhi		1561 CE		Built by one of the most influential and powerful women in Akbar's court, Maham Anga
Lal Masjid	Old Delhi		1728 CE		
Moth ki Mosque	Delhi		1505 CE		Built in 1505 by Wazir Miya Bhoiya, Prime Minister during the reign of Sikander Lodi.
Moti Masjid	Delhi		1660 CE		Built by the 6th Mughal Emperor, Aurangzeb, at the Red Fort complex for his 2nd wife Nawab Bai
Mubarak Begum Mosque	Delhi		1823 CE		Built by Mughal Dancer Mubarak Begum
Sunehri Masjid	Chandni Chowk		1722 CE		Built by Roshan-ud-Daula, during the reign of Emperor Muhammad Shah
Sunehri Bagh Masjid	Central Delhi		17th century		
Zeenat-ul-Masajid	Central Delhi		c. 1710 CE		Built by Zeenat-un-Nissa, the second daughter of Aurangzeb

== Goa ==
Name	Location	Image	Year	Religious branch	Remarks
Safa Shahouri Mosque	Ponda		1560 CE		Built by Ibrahim Adil Shah I, the 4th Adil Shahi Sultan of Bijapur

== Gujarat ==
Name	Location	Image	Year	Religious branch	Remarks
Jama Masjid	Ahmedabad		1424 CE	Sunni	Built during the reign of Ahmad Shah I, 3rd ruler of Muzaffarid dynasty and 4th Sultan of Gujarat
Ahmed Shah's Mosque	Ahmedabad				
Achut Bibi's Mosque	Ahmedabad				
Baba Lului's Mosque	Ahmedabad				
Dastur Khan's Mosque	Ahmedabad				
Rani Rupamati's Mosque	Ahmedabad				
Rani Sipri's Mosque	Ahmedabad				
Sidi Bashir Mosque	Ahmedabad				
Sarkhej Roza	Ahmedabad				
Jama Masjid	Champaner		1513 CE	Sunni	Built during the reign of Mahmud Shah I, 7th ruler of Muzaffarid dynasty and 8th Sultan of Gujarat
Masjid-e-Moazzam	Surat		1799 - 1817 CE	Dawoodi Bohra	First Built by Abde Ali Saifuddin; Rebuilt later in 1996 by Mohammed Burhanuddin

== Haryana ==
Name	Location	Image	Year	Religious branch	Remarks
Kabuli Bagh Mosque	Panipat		1527 CE		Built by Babur to mark his victory over Ibrahim Lodhi in the First Battle of Panipat
Mosque of Ala Vardi Khan	Gurgaon		18th century		built by Nawab Alivardi Khan
Thanesar Pathar Mosque	Thanesar		17th century		A Monument of National Importance; no longer used as a mosque

== Himachal Pradesh ==
Name	Location	Image	Year	Religious branch	Remarks
Jama Mosque	Dharamshala		1719 CE		
Sanjauli Mosque	Sanjauli		1907		

== Jammu and Kashmir ==
Name	Location	Image	Year built (CE)	Religious branch	Remarks
Hazratbal Shrine	Srinagar		1600s	Sufism	Considered to be Kashmir's holiest Muslim shrine; Built by 5th Mughal Emperor, Shah Jahan; Expanded in 1979
Jamia Masjid	Srinagar		1402	Sunni	Built by Sikandar Shah Miri, the 6th ruler of Shah Mir dynasty
Aali Mosque	Srinagar		1417	Islam	Situated at the premises of Eidgah Shah-i-Hamdan

== Jharkhand ==
Name	Location	Image	Year built (CE)	Religious branch	Remarks
Jama Masjid	Jamshedpur		1936	Sufism	One of the oldest and largest mosques in Jamshedpur.; Built with contribution of Muslim employees of Tata Steel; The mosque consists of a large market
Dhatkidih Masjid	Jamshedpur		1970		Largest mosque in Dhatkidih
Golmuri Masjid	Jamshedpur		1936	Hanafi and Barelvi	
Aambagan Masjid	Jamshedpur		1936		
Jama Mosque	Chitarpur		1670		One of the oldest mosques in Jharkhand

== Karnataka ==
Name	Location	Image	Year	Religious branch	Remarks	Notes
Ali Farhad Khan's Mosque	Aland					
Andu Masjid	Bijapur					
Ek Minar Mosque	Raichur					
Jama Masjid	Bidar					
Jama Masjid	Bijapur		1576 CE	Shia	Construction started by Ali Adil Shah I, the 5th Adil Shahi Sultan of Bijapur but was never completed	
Jama Masjid	Kalaburagi		1367 CE	Shia	Built by Mohammed Shah I, the 2nd ruler of Bahmani Sultanate	
Kali Masjid	Bidar					
Langar Ki Masjid	Kalaburagi					
Masjid-i-Ala	Srirangapatna					
Mecca Masjid	Bijapur					
Nav Gumbaz	Bijapur					

== Kerala ==
Name	Location	Image	Year	Religious branch	Remarks
Central Mahallu Juma Masjid	Muvattupuzha		1927 CE	Sunni	
Cheraman Juma Mosque	Kodungallur		629 CE	Sunni	Built by Malik Dinar, companion of Muhammad, on orders of Cheraman Perumal, then King of modern-day Kerala; The oldest and first mosque in the Indian subcontinent; Destroyed by the Portuguese in 1504 CE; The old building was built some time after 1504 CE; Modern corridors and halls were built in 1984 CE
Malik Dinar Mosque	Kasaragod		720 - 740 CE	Sunni (Shafi'i)	Grave of Malik Dinar
Odathil Palli	Thalassery		1806 CE	Sunni (Shafi'i)	
Sha're Mubarak Masjid	Kozhikode		2022	Sunni (Shafi'i)	India's largest mosque

== Laddakh ==
Name	Location	Image	Year	Religious branch	Remarks
Jama Mosque	Leh		1666-67 CE		
Tsa Soma Mosque	Leh				

== Madhya Pradesh ==
Name	Location	Image	Year	Religious branch	Remarks
Bibi Ki Masjid	Burhanpur				
Jama Masjid	Burhanpur				
Jama Masjid	Chanderi		853 AH (1449/1450 CE)	Sunni	
Jama Masjid	Mandu		1454 CE		Hoshang Shah, the 2nd Sultan of Malwa, started the construction and was completed during the reign of Mahmud Khalji, the 4th Sultan of Malwa
Lat Mosque	Dhar				
Moti Masjid	Bhopal		1860		
Taj-ul-Masajid	Bhopal		1871 CE	Sunni Deobandi	Largest mosque in India; Construction began in 1871 and resumed in 1971; Initiated by Shah Jahan Begum of Bhopal and continued to be built by her daughter Sultan Jahan Begum

== Maharashtra ==
Name	Location	Image	Year	Religious branch	Remarks
Alamgir Mosque	Aurangabad		1693 CE		Built by Mughal Emperor Aurangzeb
Damdi Masjid	Ahmednagar		1568 CE		Built by Sahir Khan, a nobleman of the Ahmednagar Sultanate; A Monument of National Importance; no longer used as a mosque
Haji Ali Dargah	Mumbai		1431 CE	Sufism	Mosque and Dargah or the monument of Pir Haji Ali Shah Bukhari, Sufi saint and merchant from Uzbekistan
Jama Masjid	South Mumbai		1802–1874	Sunni	
Jama Mosque	Aurangabad		1612 CE		Built by Malik Amber
Kali Masjid	Jalna		1578 CE		Built by Syed Farooque, of the Ahmadnagar Sultanate
Moghal Masjid	Mumbai		1860 CE	Shia	Funded by Haji Mohammed Husain Shirazi, an Iranian businessman; Completed in the Qajar style

== Manipur ==
In Manipuri tradition, Laishang (mosque) denotes a place where the Jumu'ah prayer is performed, while Penjaga (musalla) refers to smaller prayer houses used only for daily Salat. By 1819 CE, 13 Laishangs and 11 Penjagas were reported across the Muslim settlements of Manipur.

Historical Laishangs (Mosques) and Penjagas (Musallas) in Manipur before 1819 CE
Laishang (Mosque)	Penjaga (Musalla)
Md. Saani’s Lainingsang (Kangla Sanathong)	Fundrei Penjaga
Moirangkhom Sangoi Laishang	Hairok Penjaga
Kangla Ukok Sangoi Laishang	Ukhongsang Penjaga
Ningthounai Sangoi Laishang	Thoubal Moiching Penjaga
Erong Chesaba Sangoi Laishang	Malom Khongmangbang Penjaga
Mayang Imphal Sangoi Laishang	Uroop Penjaga
Sangai Yumfam Sangoi Laishang	Khetri Bengul Penjaga
Awang Laikai Sangoi Laishang	Lamsang Taokhong Penjaga
Lilong Sangoi Laishang	Khomyam Penjaga
Makha Laikai Sangoi Laishang	Moirang Taokhong Penjaga
Kairao Sangoi Laishang	Pangal Tabi Penjaga
Kairao Sangoi Laishang (duplicate)	
Porompat Sangoi Laishang	

Today, there are 116 Mosques in Manipur.

== Meghalaya ==
Name	Location	Image	Year	Religious branch	Remarks
Madina Mosque	Shillong		2012	Sunni	One of the largest mosques in Northeast India; Capacity for 2,000 worshippers

== Mizoram ==
There are several mosques in Mizoram:

- Aizawl Mosque
- Pushpak Masjid
- Jame Masjid (Lunglei)
- Kolasib mosque

== Nagaland ==
- Kohima Jama Masjid is built in 1906

== Odisha ==
- Qadam e Rasool, Cuttack
- Bukhari Baba Mosque, Cuttack
- Dewan Bazar Masjid, Cuttack
- Nimasahi Masjid, Cuttack
- Shahi Mosque, Cuttack
- Jama Mosque, Cuttack

== Punjab ==
Name	Location	Image	Year	Religious branch	Remarks
Moorish Mosque	Kapurthala		1930		Built by Maharajah Jagatjit Singh, the last ruler of Kapurthala

== Rajasthan ==
Name	Location	Image	Year	Religious branch	Remarks
Chaurasi Khamba Mosque	Kaman		13th century	Sunni	Built by Mohammad Ghouri on the site of a former Hindu temple; Patronized by Baha Al-Din Tughrul
Lal Masjid	Tijara		17th century		Built by Hindal Mirza

== Sikkim ==
According to Sikkim government official site there are 7 most in whole Sikkim by region:-

East Sikkim

- Gangtok Masjid
- Singtam Masjid
- Ramgpo Masjid

North Sikkim

- Mangan Masjid

South Sikkim

- Namchi Masjid
- Jorthang Masjid

West Sikkim

- Gyalsing Masjid

== Tamil Nadu ==
Name	Location	Image	Year	Religious branch	Remarks
Kazimar Big Mosque	Madurai		1284 CE	Sunni Barelvi	First Muslim place of worship in Madurai; One of the oldest mosques to follow Hanafi, Hanbali and Shadhili
Palaiya Jumma Palli	Kilakarai		628–630 CE	Sunni Barelvi	Oldest mosque in Tamil Nadu and one of the oldest mosque in India; Rebuilt in 1036 CE
Periamet Mosque	Chennai		1838		Capacity for 4,000 worshippers
Triplicane Big Mosque	Chennai		1795		Built by the family of Muhammad Ali Khan Wallajah; Includes a dargah in the mosque grounds

== Telangana ==
Name	Location	Image	Year	Religious branch	Remarks
Charminar	Hyderabad		1591 CE	Shia	Mosque of four minarets; Situated on the east bank of Musi river and adjacent to Makkah Masjid; Built by Muhammad Quli Qutb Shah, the 5th Sultan of Golconda and ruler of Qutb Shahi dynasty, a Persianate Shia Islamic dynasty
Hayat Bakshi Mosque	Golconda, Hyderabad		1672 CE	Shia	Built by Abdullah Qutb Shah, the 7th Sultan of Golconda and ruler of Qutb Shahi dynasty, a Persianate Shia Islamic dynasty; Named after Hayat Bakshi Begum, wife of Muhammad Qutb Shah, 6th Sultan of Golconda and ruler of Qutb Shahi dynasty
Khairtabad Mosque	Hyderabad		1626 CE		Built in honor of Akhund Mulla Abul Malik, the tutor of Khairunnisa Begum, daughter of Quli Qutb Shah, 1st Sultan of Golconda and founder of Qutb Shahi dynasty
Makkah Masjid	Hyderabad		1693 CE	Sunni	Construction began in 1617 CE, during the reign of Muhammad Qutb Shah, 6th Sultan of Golconda and ruler of Qutb Shahi dynasty; Construction completed in 1693 CE, during the reign of 6th Mughal Emperor, Aurangzeb; It was built after Charminar
Mian Mishk Masjid	Hyderabad		1674 CE		Built by Miyan Mishk, a nobleman during the reign of 7th Sultan of Golconda and ruler of Qutb Shahi dynasty, Abdullah Qutb Shah; In a partial ruinous state
Spanish Mosque	Hyderabad		1906 CE		Built in Moorish style of architecture by Sir Vicar-ul-Umra
Toli Masjid	Hyderabad		1671 CE		Built by Abdullah Qutb Shah, the 7th Sultan of Golconda and ruler of Qutb Shahi dynasty, a Persianate Shia Islamic dynasty

== Tripura ==
- Gedu Mia Mosque

== Uttar Pradesh ==
Name	Location	Image	Year	Religious branch	Remarks
Aasfi Masjid	Lucknow		1784 CE	Shia	Located in the Bara Imambara complex; Built by Asaf-ud-Daula, 4th Nawab of Awadh
Atala Masjid	Jaunpur		1408 CE	Sunni	In 1377 CE, Firuz Shah Tughlaq, the 19th Sultan of Delhi and 3rd ruler of Tughlaq dynasty laid the foundation; In 1408 CE, Ibrahim Shah, the 3rd ruler of Jaunpur Sultanate completed the construction
Great Mosque	Budaun		1223 CE	Sunni	Built by Iltutmish, the 3rd Sultan of Delhi and the Mamluk dynasty
Jama Masjid	Agra		1648 CE	Sunni	Built by Jahanara Begum, daughter of 5th Mughal Emperor, Shah Jahan
Jama Masjid	Dildarnagar		1705 CE	Sunni	
Jama Masjid	Fatehpur Sikri		1571 - 1574 CE	Sunni	Built by 3rd Mughal Emperor, Akbar
Jama Masjid	Jaunpur		1473 CE	Sunni	The foundation of the mosque was laid in 1438 CE by Ibrahim Shah, the 3rd ruler of Jaunpur Sultanate; The complex was built in stages but was finally completed in 1473 CE by Hussain Shah, the last ruler of the Jaunpur Sultanate
Jama Masjid	Lucknow		1845 CE	Shia	Construction was started in 1839 CE by Mohammad Ali Shah, 9th Nawab of Awadh; After the death of Mohammad Ali Shah in 1842 CE, construction was completed by his wife
Jama Masjid	Rampur		1939 CE	Sunni	Built by Nawab Raza Ali Khan of Rampur State
Moti Masjid	Agra		1653 CE	Sunni	Built by the 5th Mughal Emperor, Shah Jahan
Sir Syed Masjid	Aligarh		1915 CE	Shia & Sunni	Located in Aligarh Muslim University campus
Teele Wali Masjid	Lucknow		1658 - 1660 CE	Sunni Barelvi	Shahi Imam Syed Fazlul Mannan Rahmani
Ziarat Shareef	Kakrala		1980 CE	Sunni Barelvi	Built by Shah Saqlain Miyan

== West Bengal ==
Name	Location	Image	Year	Religious branch	Remarks
Adina Mosque	Malda		1363 CE	Shia	At the time, the largest mosque of South Asia built by Sikandar Shah, 2nd Sultan of Bengal and the Ilyas Shahi dynasty; It is a centrally protected monument as per Archaeological Survey of India
Baro Shona Masjid					
Basri Shah Mosque	Kolkata		1804 CE	Sunni	Oldest mosque in Kolkata
Chawk Masjid	Murshidabad		1767 CE	Shia	Established by Munni Begum, 2nd wife of the Nawab of Bengal, Mir Jafar
Jama Masjid, Motijheel	Motijheel				
Katra Masjid	Murshidabad		1724 CE	Shia	A former caravanserai; Tomb of Nawab Murshid Quli Khan; One of the largest caravansaries in the South Asia
Nakhoda Mosque	Kolkata			Sunni Barelvi	Reconstructed in 1935 CE
Tipu Sultan Mosque	Kolkata		1842 CE	Sunni	Built by Ghulam Muhammad Sultan Sahib, the youngest son of Tipu Sultan

== See also ==
- Anti-Mosque campaign in India
- Islam in India
- Lists of mosques
  - List of grand mosques
  - List of largest mosques
  - List of oldest mosques
  - List of tallest mosques
  - List of mosques in Kolkata
