= Ziarat Shareef =

- Ziarat Shareef Kakrala
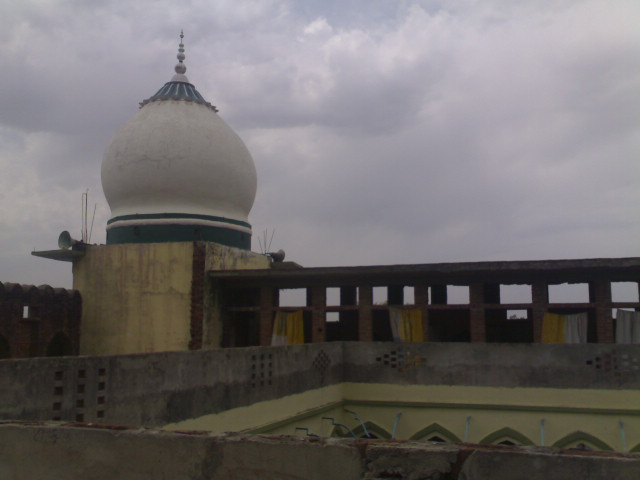
- A dome of the mosque and madrasah, in 2010

- Location of the mosque and madrasah in Uttar Pradesh

Religion
- Affiliation: Islam
- Ecclesiastical or organizational status: Mosque and madrasah
- Status: Active

Location
- Location: Kakrala, Badaun district, Uttar Pradesh
- Country: India
- Interactive map of Ziarat Shareef
- Coordinates: 27°53′36″N 79°11′38″E

Architecture
- Architect: Shah Saqlain Miyan

Specifications
- Dome: One
- Elevation: 160 m (525 ft)

The Ziarat Shareef (Urdu: زیارت) is a mosque and madrasah (Arabic: مدرسة خاصة, romanized: Madrasah khāṣah, lit. 'private school'), located in Kakrala city, in the Budaun district of the state of Uttar Pradesh, India. The building was designed and built by Shah Saqlain Miyan. The building also contains the Khatoli Shareef of Shah Dargahi Miyan. People from across the country come to visit the Khatoli Shareef. This visit is called the ziyarat, hence the name of this building.

== Overview ==
The madrasah is the oldest madrasah in Kakrala City. The main objective of the institution is to impart education to under-privileged students. The madrasah provides Islamic as well as modern education to students who come from across northern India.

== See also ==
- Islam in India
- List of mosques in India
