= Periamet Mosque =

Mosque in Chennai, India

- பெரியமேடு மசூதி
- Location of the mosque in Chennai

Religion
- Affiliation: Islam
- Ecclesiastical or organizational status: Mosque
- Status: Active

Location
- Location: Sydnehams Road, Periamet, Chennai, Tamil Nadu
- Country: India
- Interactive map of Periamet Mosque
- Coordinates: 13°05′05″N 80°16′13″E

Architecture
- Type: Mosque architecture
- Established: 1838

Specifications
- Capacity: 4,000 worshipers
- Dome: Three (maybe more)
- Minaret: Many

The Periamet Mosque (Tamil: பெரியமேடு மசூதி) is a mosque situated on the corner of Sydnehams Road and Vepery High Road in the Periamet (Note: Sometimes spelled as Periyamet.) neighbourhood of Chennai, in the state of Tamil Nadu, India.

== History ==
The Periamet Mosque was constructed in 1838 by hides and skins' dealers, then later by Haji Mohamed Khasim Baig Sahib, The mosque has been rebuilt twice after the Independence of India. The mosque can accommodate up to 4,000 worshipers.

== See also ==
- Islam in India
- List of mosques in India
