= Moghal Masjid, Mumbai =

Mosque in Mumbai, Maharashtra, India

Moghal Mosque
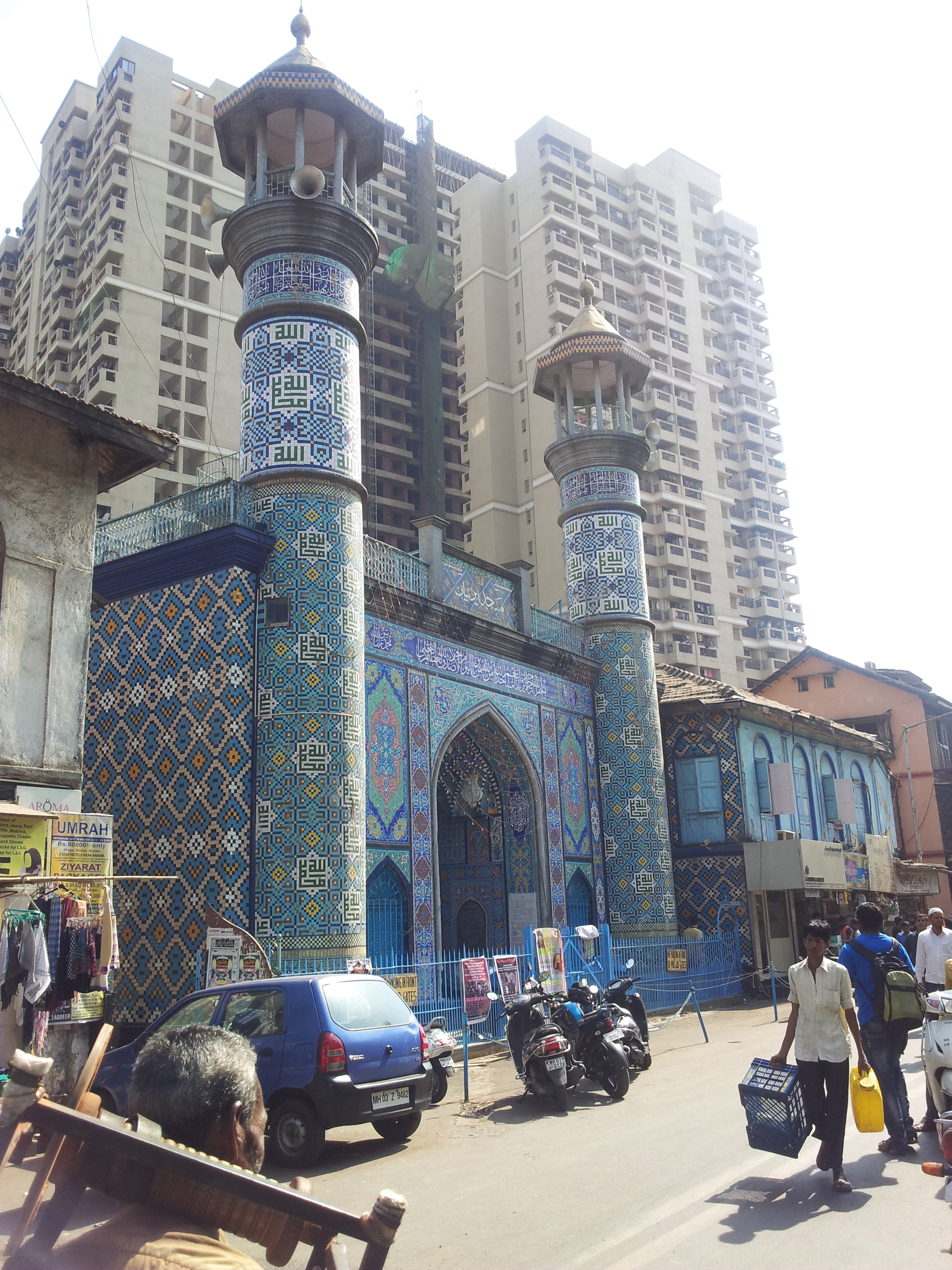
- The gate of the mosque, in 2016

- Location of the mosque in Mumbai

Religion
- Affiliation: Shia Islam
- Ecclesiastical or organizational status: Mosque
- Status: Active

Location
- Location: Dongri, Mumbai, Maharashtra
- Country: India
- Interactive map of Moghal Mosque
- Coordinates: 18°57′34″N 72°50′00″E

Architecture
- Type: Mosque architecture
- Style: Qajar
- Funded by: Haji Mohammed Husain Shirazi
- Completed: 1860
- Minaret: Two

The Moghal Masjid, officially the Masjid-e-Iranian, is a Shia mosque, located in the Dongri area of Mumbai, in the state of Maharashtra, India.

== Overview ==
The mosques was built in 1860, with the support of Haji Mohammed Husain Shirazi, a prominent Iranian businessman who was living in Mumbai.

Built in an Iranian Qajar style, the exterior is embellished with coloured tiles. The carpets and chandeliers in the mosque interior were imported from Iran. Verses from the Quran are inscribed on the walls. In the 1990s, the mosque was restored by Reza Kabul.

The mosque is managed by the Haji Mohammed Husain Shirazi trust.

== See also ==
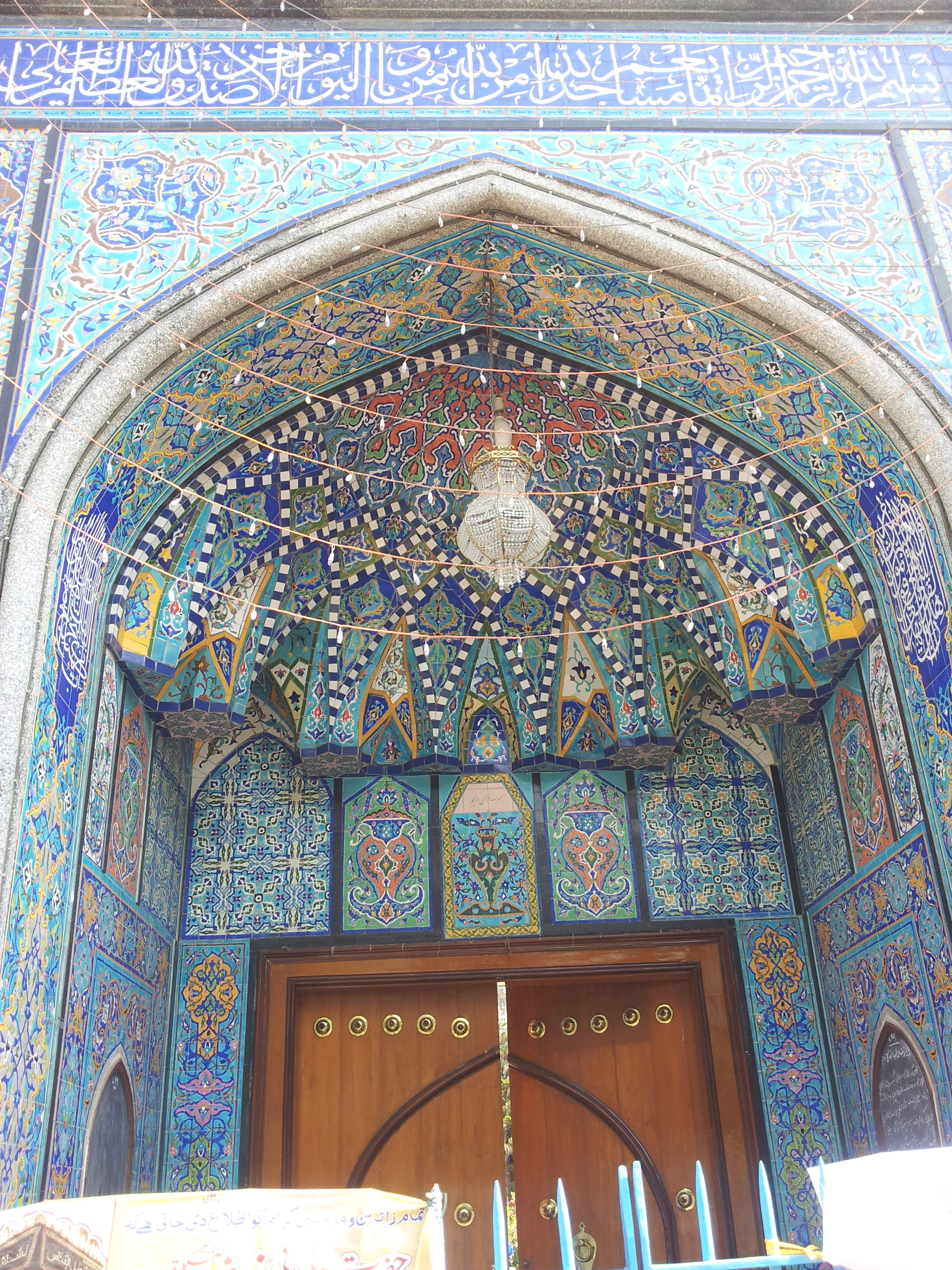
Detail of the Qajar architecture, at the mosque entrance

- Shia Islam in India
- List of mosques in India
