= Moth ki Mosque =

Mosque in Delhi, India

- Urdu: موتھ کی مسجد
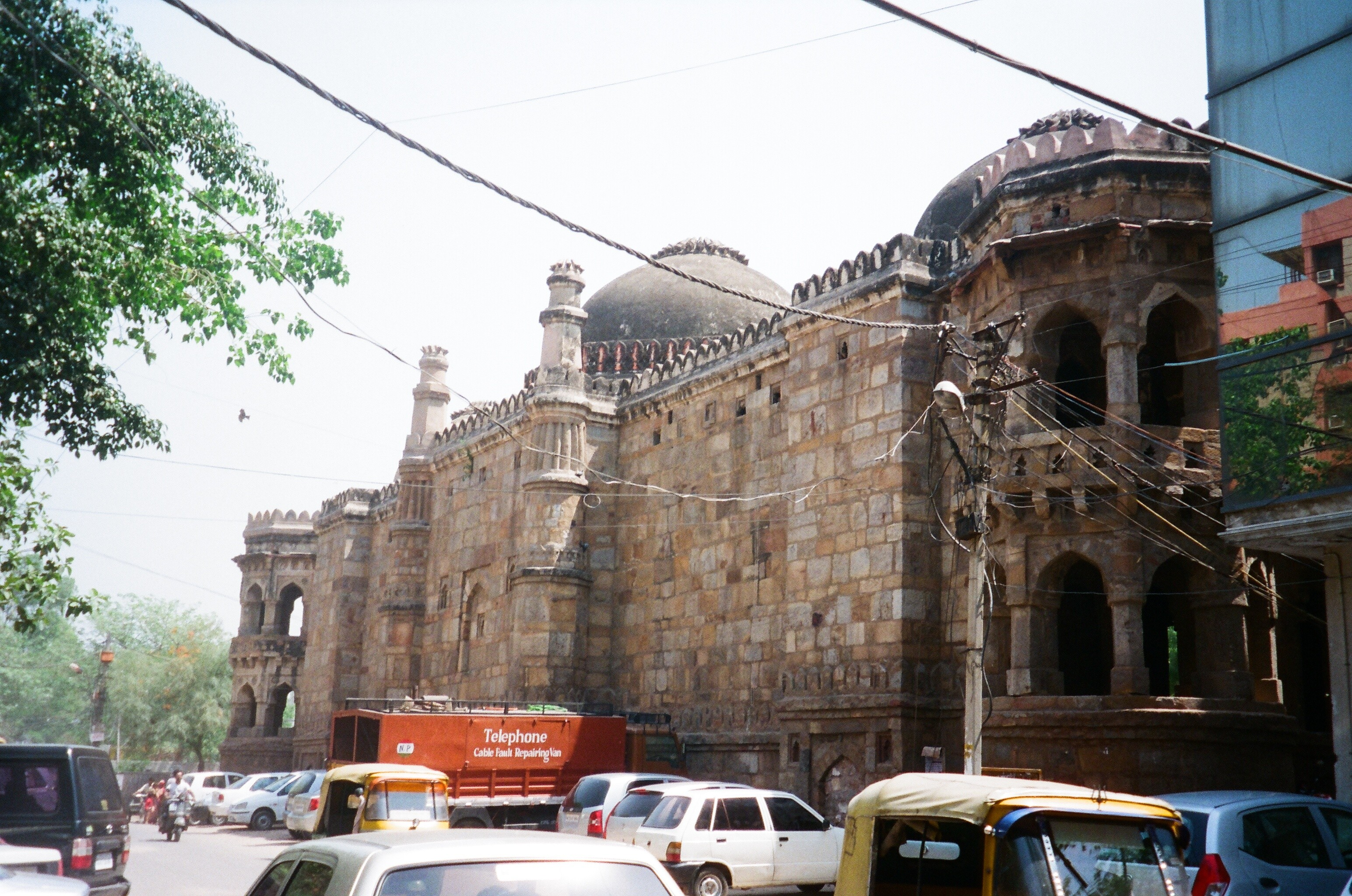
- The north side of the mosque, in 2009

- Location of the mosque in South Delhi

Religion
- Affiliation: Islam
- Ecclesiastical or organisational status: Mosque
- Status: Active

Location
- Location: South Extension Part II, South Delhi, Delhi NCT
- Country: India
- Coordinates: 28°33′45″N 77°13′4″E

Architecture
- Architect: Miyan Bhuiya
- Type: Mosque architecture
- Style: Indo-Islamic
- Founder: Miya Bhoiya, Lodi dynasty
- Completed: 1505

Specifications
- Length: 38.6 m (126.6 ft)
- Dome: Three (semi circular)
- Materials: Red sandstone; white marble; tiles

Monument of National Importance
- Official name: Moti-ki-Masjid
- Reference no.: N-DL-101

Moth ki Mosque (Urdu: موتھ کی مسجد, romanized: Moth-ki Masjid, lit. 'Lentil Mosque'; [moʈʰ kiː masdʒɪd]) is a 16th-century mosque located in the South Delhi district of India. The mosque was built in 1505 by Wazir Miya Bhoiya, Prime Minister during the reign of Sikander Lodi of the Lodi dynasty. It was a new type of mosque developed by the Lodis in the fourth city of the medieval Delhi Sultanate. This mosque was considered a beautiful domed (gumbad) structure of the period.

The mosque is in the modern locality of South Extension Part II, Uday Park, and Masjid Moth, comprising residential and commercial establishments in the urban setting of South Delhi. It is surrounded by various other smaller dargahs and monuments that may be found peppered within the urban village. The mosque is a Monument of National Importance, administered by the Archaeological Survey of India.

== Legend ==
It is narrated that when Sultan Sikandar Lodi was on a visit to a mosque in the vicinity of the present location of the Moth Ki Masjid for prayer, he knelt over a grain of moth (a kind of lentil), which had been dropped by a bird. Wazir Miya Bhoiya, who had accompanied the King, saw the lentil seed and observed that:

A seed so honoured by His majesty must not be thrown away. It must be used in the service of God.

So he took the moth seed and planted it in his garden for further growth. Over the years, the process of repeated planting and replanting of the moth seeds was carried out. In this process, the seeds multiplied several times. The Wazir finally sold the rich harvest and earned good money. With the proceeds of the sale he built the mosque after seeking permission from the Sultan to construct the Mosque. Impressed by the ingenuity of his minister, Sikandar Lodi laid the foundation for building the mosque.

Another version of the legend is that Sikandar Lodhi on one of his visits to the area played a prank on his Prime Minister by giving him a gift of a grain of moth (lentil). The Wazir accepted the gift in good grace and instead of throwing it away planted it in his garden. Over the years repeated plantation resulted in a rich harvest that provided a surplus income to the Wazir. Thereafter, the wazir, with the revenue earned from the lentil grains, decided to build a mosque. On completion, he invited the Sultan to visit the mosque and narrated the sequence of events which led to the building of the mosque. Impressed by this unique achievement, the Lodi named the mosque as "Moth Ki Masjid" or the Mosque from the Moth Lentil.

== Structure ==
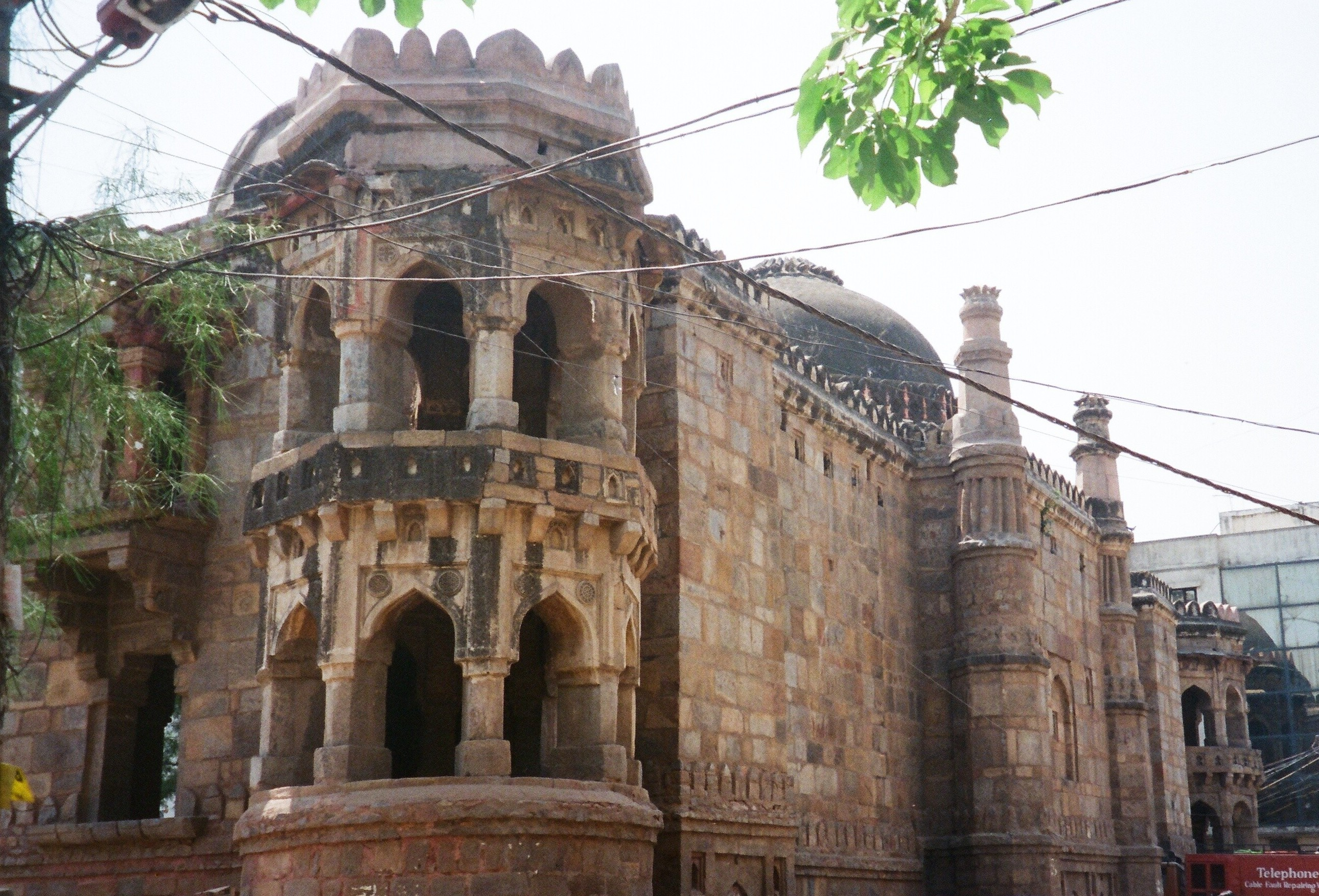
Outer wall of the mosque

Raised on a high plinth, the mosque has a square layout. It is approached from the eastern side street of village Moti Masjid, through an exquisitely designed gate made of red, blue, black and white coloured sandstone arranged in a neat design. In particular, the arch of the gateway has a Hindu arch within a Muslim arch.

Up the gateway steps, the entry is into a large courtyard, 38.6 metres (127 ft) wide, surrounded by walls. Within the courtyard, on the western side is the main shrine or the mosque with the rectangular prayer hall porch, which has a façade of five arched openings. The corners of the rectangular prayer hall are adorned with double storied towers. The towers have arched openings at the rear end of the roof with domed octagonal chhatris (cenotaphs) on the related walls. The west side wall is provided with tapering turrets that depict a sophisticated outline.

The cenotaphs were the first of its kind to be built in India and since then these have been replicated in several other monuments, even in the Deccan. There are three impressive domes inside the prayer hall with the mihrab located on the west qibla wall of the central dome, which is the largest of the three domes. The mihrab depicts Quranic inscriptions in flora Nakashi in Iranian design. Turrets project out of the qibla. The central dome is supported on squinches. The domes on both flanks are borne on muqarnas pendentives. Carved panels of red sandstone and white marble and plaster, as well as glazed tiles embellish the walls of the mosque. The overall effect of the Mosque has been best described as:

… epitomizes in itself all that is best in Architecture of the Lodis and displays a freedom of imagination, a bold diversity of design, an appreciation of contrasting light and shade and a sense of harmony in line and colour, which combine to make it one of the most spirited and picturesque buildings of its kind in the whole range of Islamic art.

It is also said that it was the private mosque of the builder.

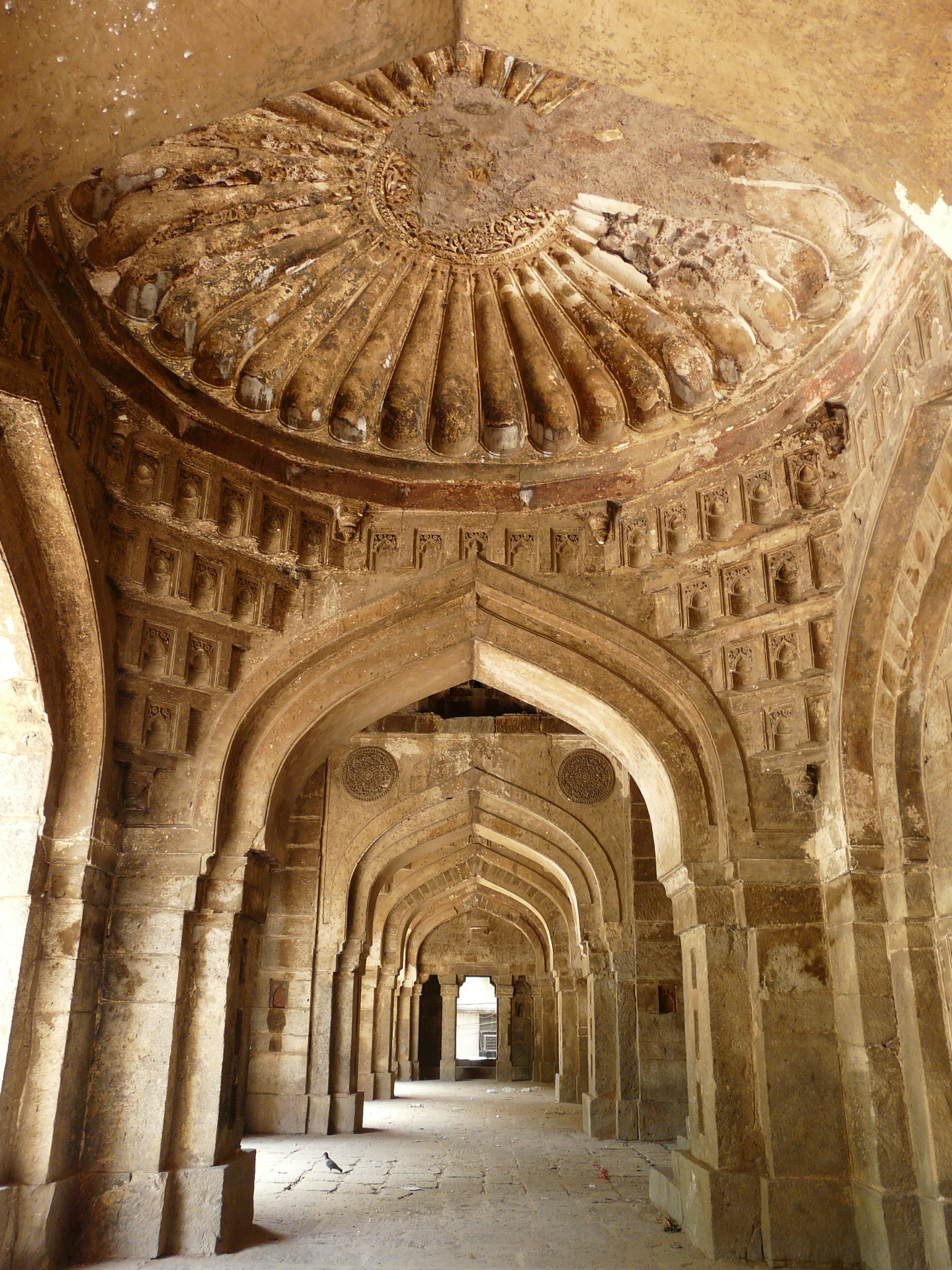
Five towered passage inside the mosque

An unusual feature of this Indo–Islamic mosque is that it has an austere design with no minarets, calligraphic decorations, and embellishments, which are otherwise traditional features of mosques. The dome is semicircular and windows have latticework screens. An architectural appreciation of the structure vis-à-vis the five arched façade of domes of the period aptly infers:

… the rapid crystallization of the earlier concept. Firstly, it is considerably larger than its predecessor. Secondly, the articulation of the recessed arches is far more adept. Thirdly, embellishment has been done using elegant niches on the columns abutting the arches. Another important feature is the use of better material and color, as if the masons were trying for something more permanent and forceful.

== Gallery ==
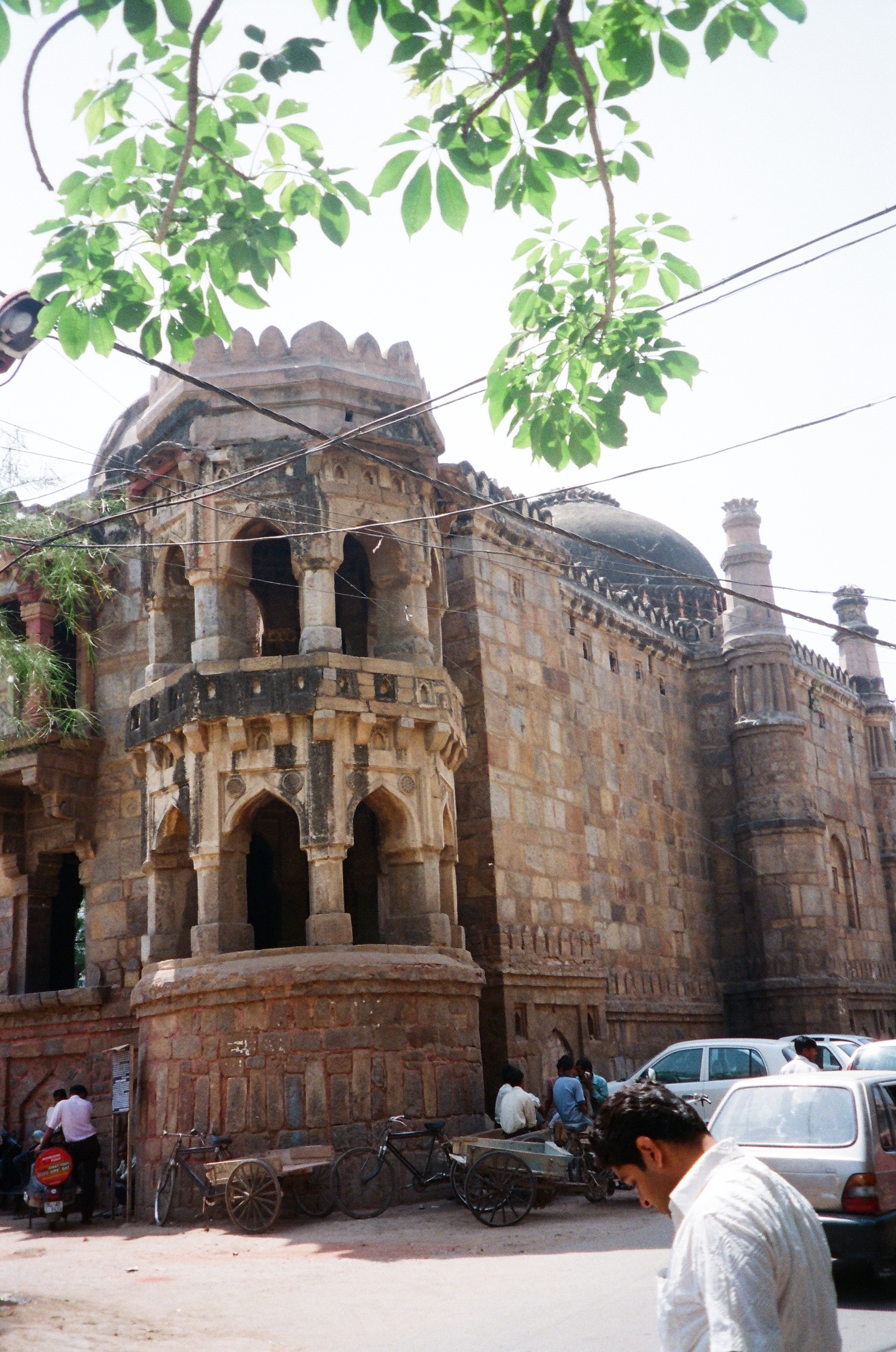
Double storeyed corner tower of the mosque

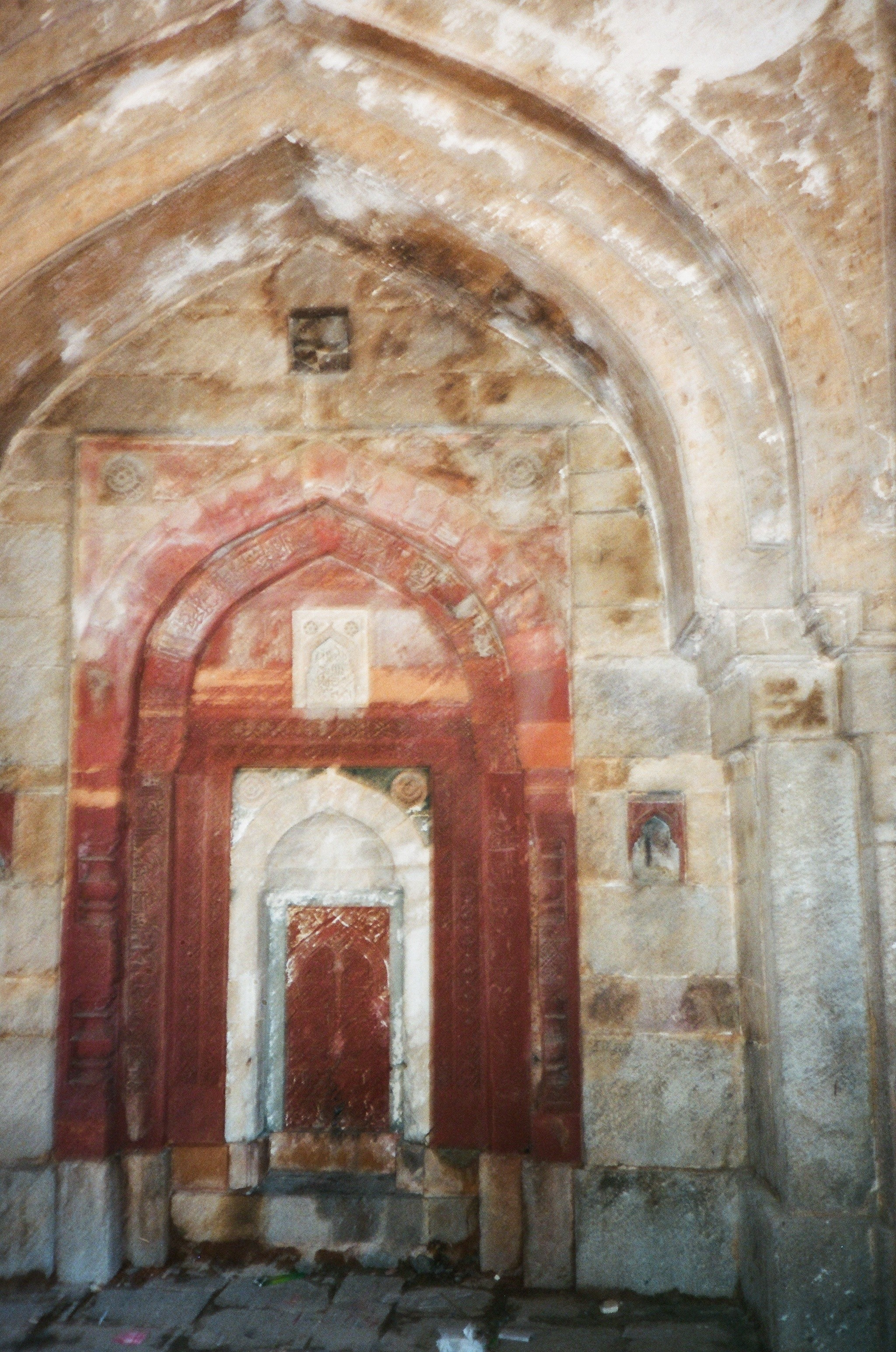
Mihrab below the main dome

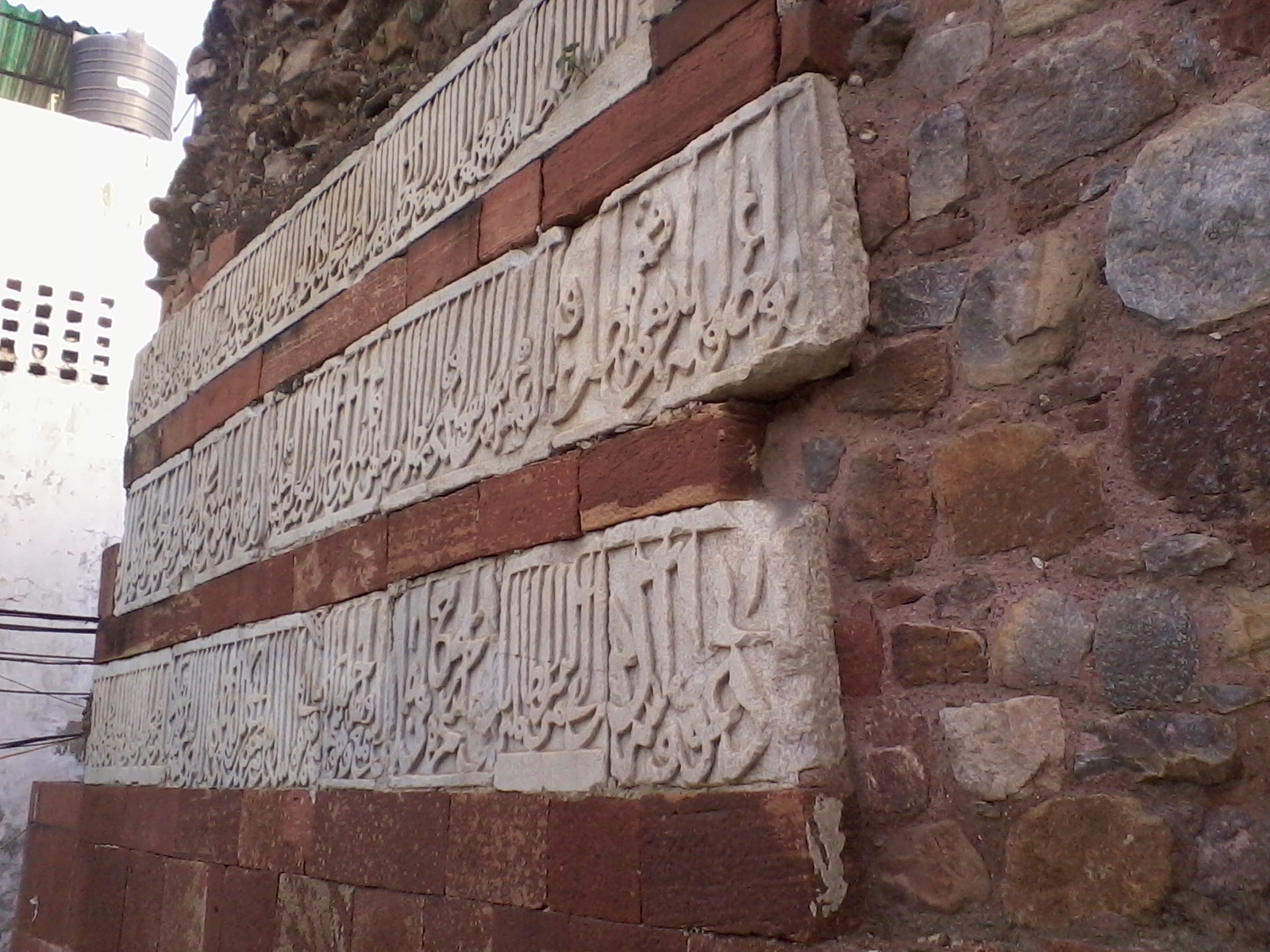
Urdu inscription on the entrance gate

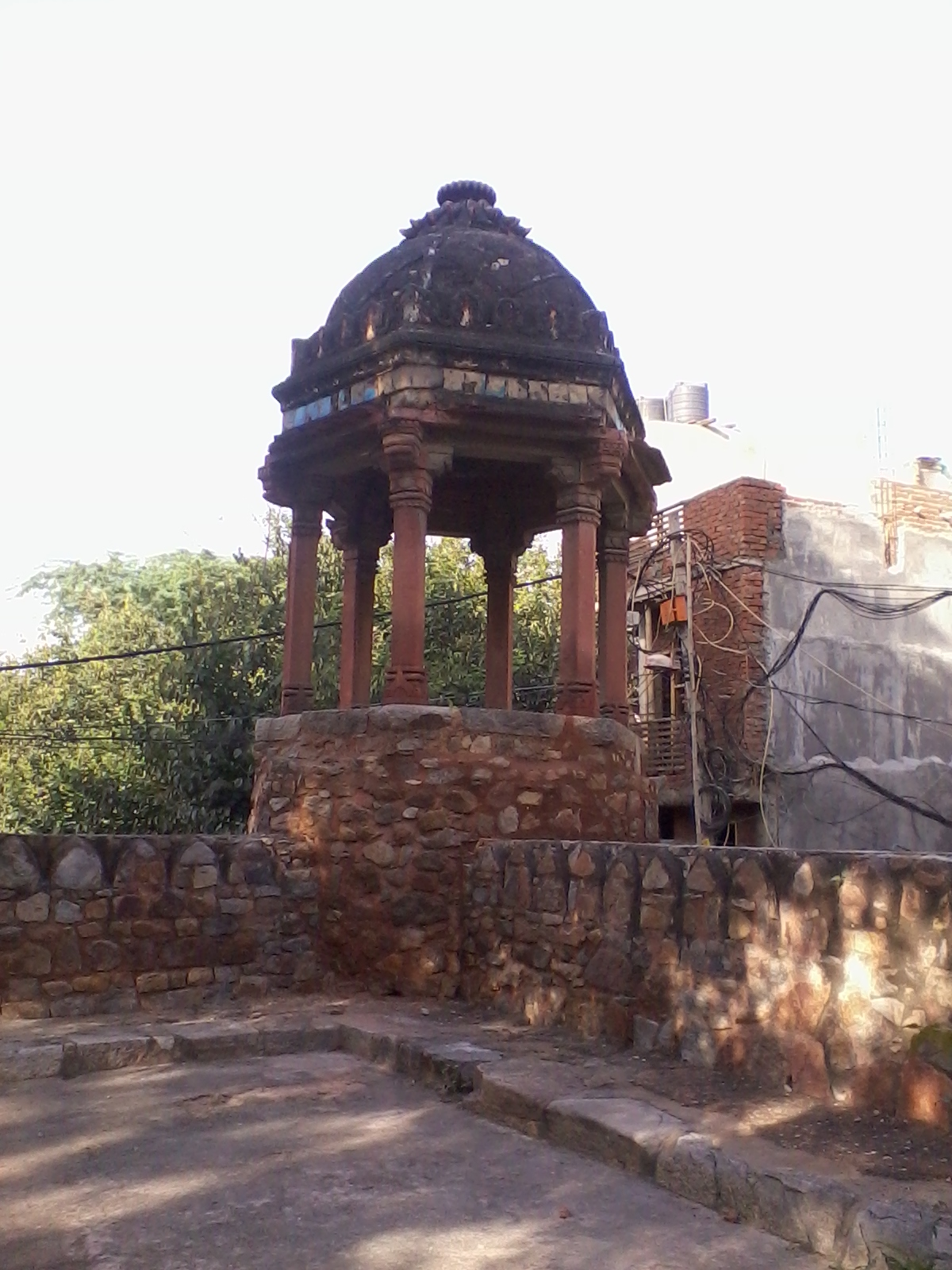
One of four tombs located in the mosque grounds

== See also ==
- Islam in India
- List of mosques in India
- List of Monuments of National Importance in Delhi
