= Langar Ki Masjid =

Former mosque in Kalaburagi, Karnataka, India

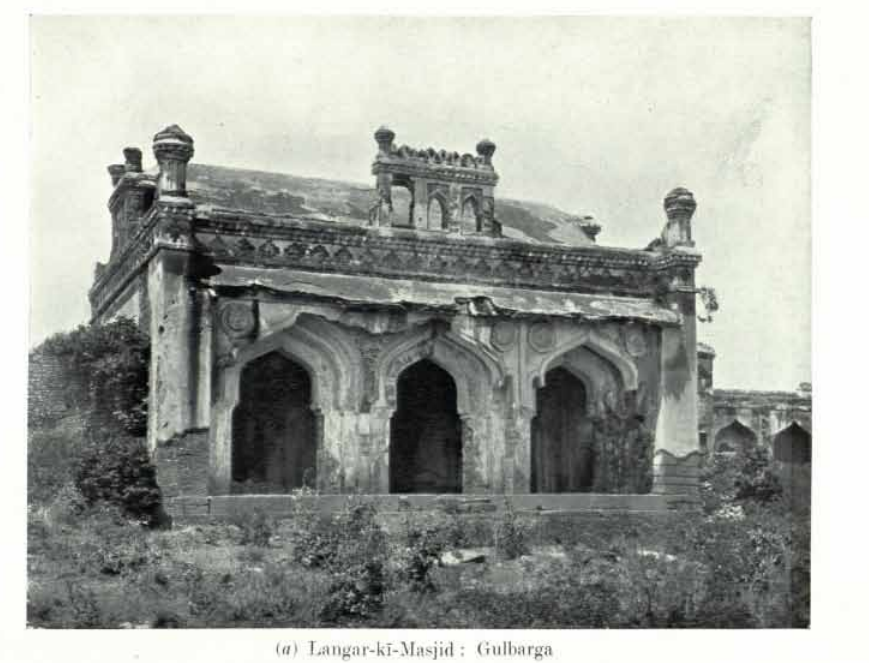
- The mosque, in partial ruins, in c. 1939

- Location of the former mosque in Karnataka

Religion
- Affiliation: Islam (former)
- Ecclesiastical or organizational status: Mosque (former)
- Status: Inactive (partial ruinous state)

Location
- Location: Kalaburagi, Karnataka
- Country: India
- Interactive map of Langar Ki Masjid
- Coordinates: 17°21′52″N 76°49′55″E

Architecture
- Type: Mosque architecture
- Style: Bahmani
- Completed: 14th century

Specifications
- Dome: Several
- Minaret: Four
- Inscriptions: One (maybe more)

The Langar Ki Masjid, also known as Langar Masjid or Langar Mosque, is a former mosque, now in partial ruins, situated in Kalaburagi, in the state of Karnataka, India. The former mosque is a state protected monument.

== History ==
The former mosque is dated from the 14th century, during the Bahmani Sultanate.

== Architecture ==
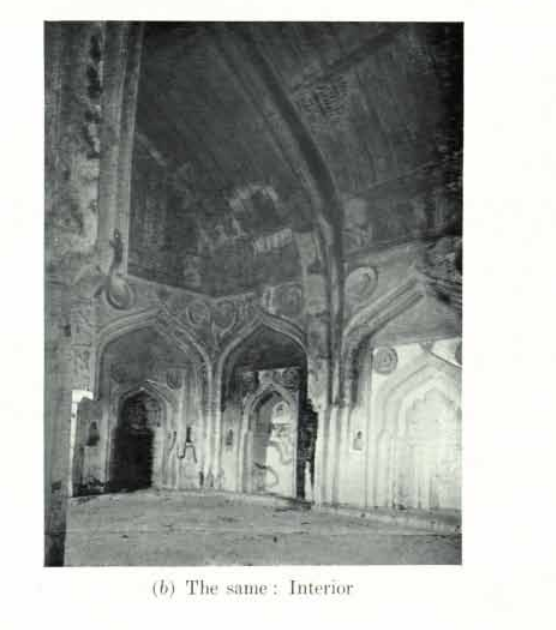
Interior

The plan of the building is quadrangular, and small minarets are provided on all four corners. The façade has three identical arched entrances leading into the interior. These arches are 5.5 metres (18 ft) high, and 3.0 metres (10 ft) wide, and their spandrels contain medallions ornamented with plaster work. Above the arches, a chajja rests on stone brackets. A parapet with a cruciform-like design runs across the length of the roof, on all four sides. The roof is arch-shaped, and is covered with screens of arches, placed in the middle of the parapet. There are two extensions to the mosque, added at a later date, attached to the northern and southern walls respectively.

The prayer hall, measuring 14.9 by 9.8 metres (49 by 32 ft), is divided into three bays by two arches. These arches are 8.2 metres (27 ft) high and 9.1 metres (30 ft) wide. The ceiling is the mosque's chief architectural feature, which is vaulted in the shape of an arch, with representations of ribs and struts, resembling those of a Buddhist chaitya.

=== Tomb ===
Towards the northwest of the mosque is a Bahmani-style tomb. The tomb has a square base surmounted by a semi-circular dome. Each of the sides of the base measure 16 metres (52 ft). The base is approximately 7.9 metres (26 ft) high, with the dome rising another 7.9 metres (26 ft), and thus the entire tomb is 16 metres (52 ft) high. Two arched entrances are provided in the northern and southern walls of the tomb. Its western wall contains some inscriptions from the Quran. The tomb also bears an inscription dating it to 1434.

== See also ==
- Islam in India
- List of mosques in India
