= Jama Mosque, Delanipur =

Mosque in Andaman and Nicobar Islands, India

Jama Mosque
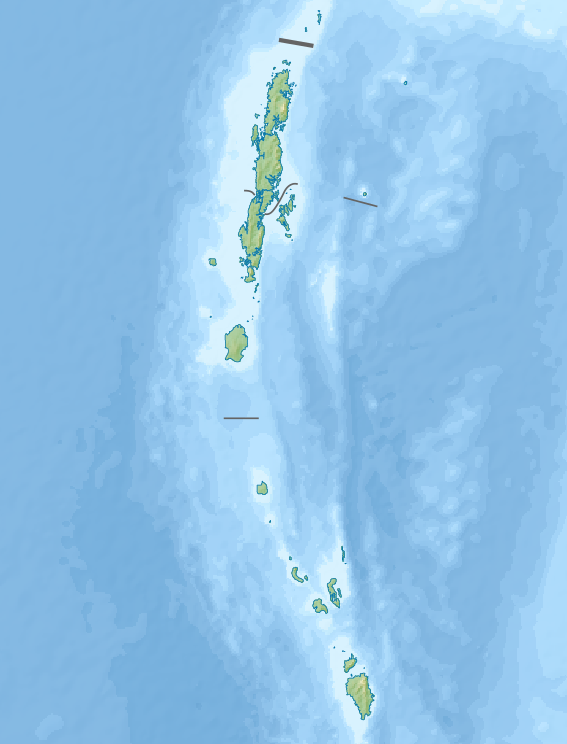
- Location of the mosque in the Andaman and Nicobar Islands

Religion
- Affiliation: Islam
- Ecclesiastical or organizational status: Friday mosque
- Status: Active

Location
- Location: Delanipur, Port Blair, Andaman and Nicobar Islands
- Country: India
- Interactive map of Jama Mosque
- Coordinates: 11°40′01″N 92°43′34″E

Architecture
- Type: Mosque architecture
- Style: Islamic

Specifications
- Dome: One
- Minaret: Two

The Jama Mosque, also known as Delanipur Mosque or Jama Masjid, is a Friday mosque located in the Delanipur area of Port Blair in Andaman and Nicobar Islands in the India.

The mosque is a venue of celebration during festivals of Id-Ul-Fitr and Id-Ul-Zuha, by the local Muslim community. The mosque holds prayer sessions every day.

== See also ==
- Islam in India
- List of mosques in India
