= Jama Masjid, Chanderi =

Mosque in Chanderi, Madhya Pradesh, India

Jama Masjid
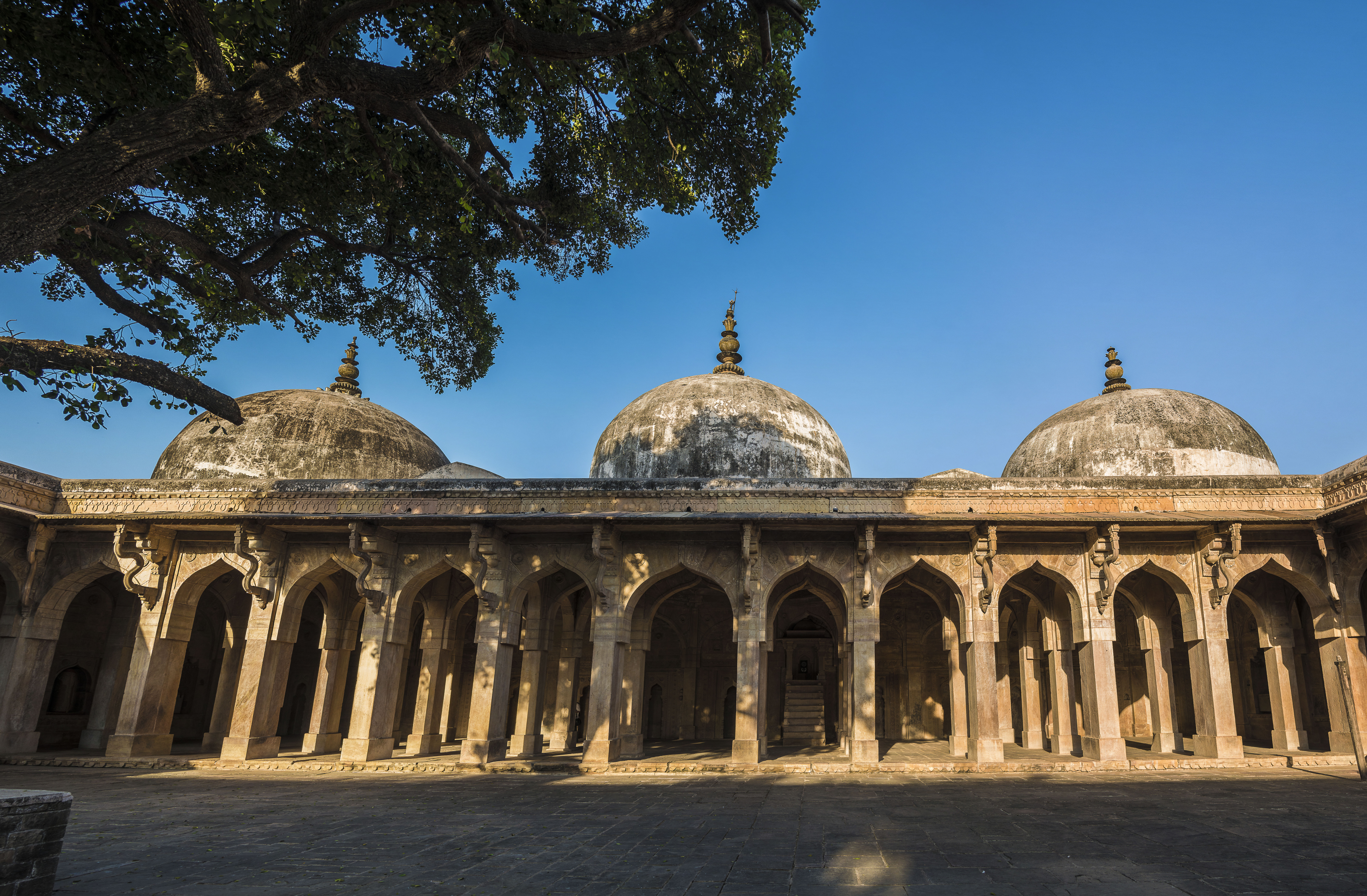
- The mosque in 2014

- Location of the mosque in Madhya Pradesh

Religion
- Affiliation: Sunni Islam
- Ecclesiastical or organizational status: Friday mosque
- Status: Active

Location
- Location: Chanderi, Ashoknagar district, Madhya Pradesh
- Country: India
- Interactive map of Jama Masjid
- Coordinates: 24°42′37″N 78°08′06″E

Architecture
- Type: Mosque architecture
- Style: Indo-Islamic
- Completed: 853 AH (1449/1450 CE)

Specifications
- Dome: Three
- Materials: Stone; marble

Monument of National Importance
- Official name: Jama Masjid
- Reference no.: N-MP-127

The Jama Masjid is a Friday mosque in Chanderi, in the Ashoknagar district of the state of Madhya Pradesh, India. The mosque was completed in 853 AH (1449/1450 CE) and is a Monument of National Importance.

== Description ==
The mosque has three domes, one over each bay, completed in white marble. The prayer hall has eleven arched entrances, while the northern and southern arcades have nine each.

== Gallery ==
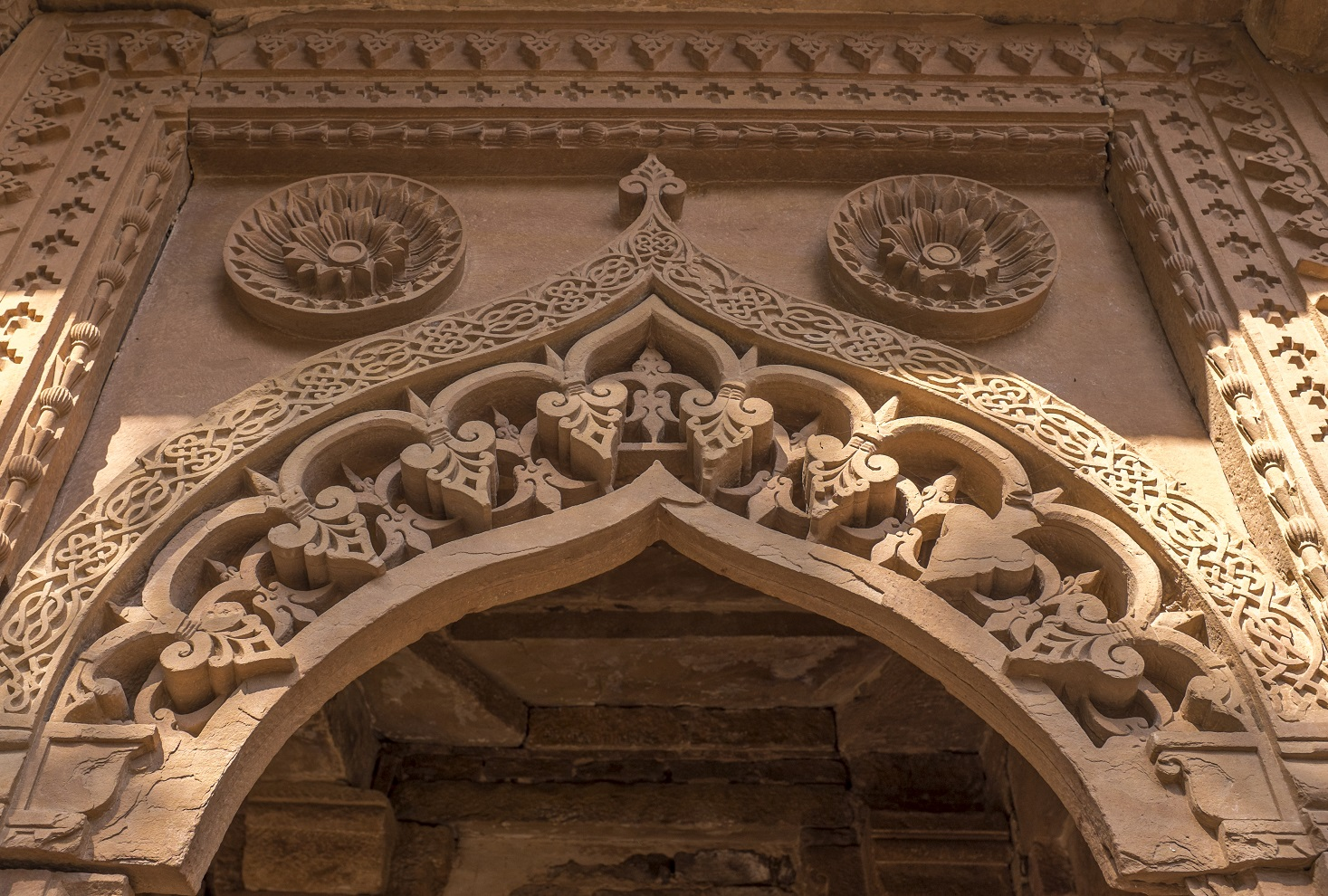
Ornately carved doorway

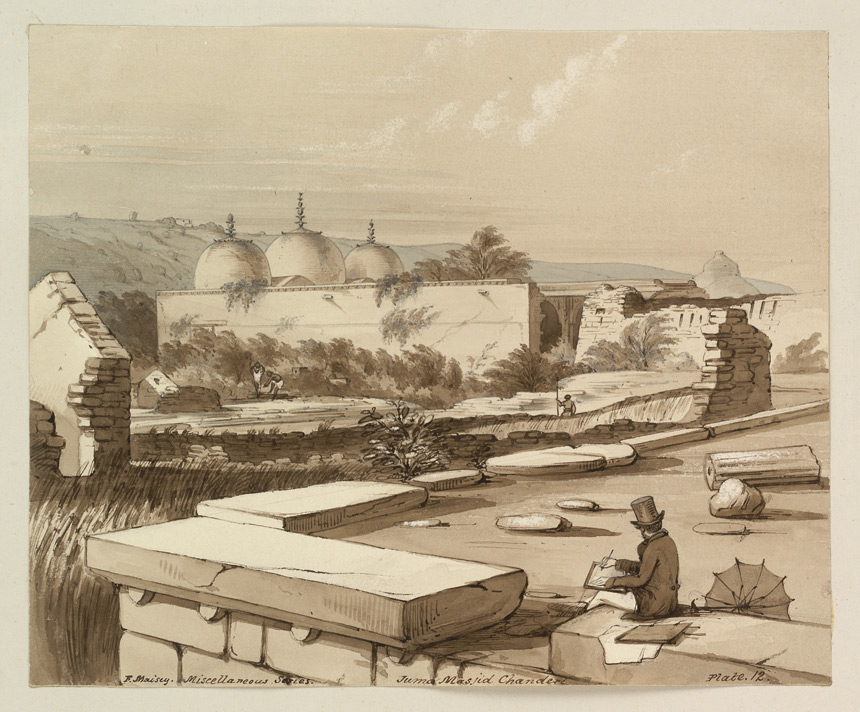
The mosque in 1850, by Frederick Charles Maisey

== See also ==
- Islam in India
- List of mosques in India
