= Rani Sipri's Mosque =

Mosque in Ahmedabad, Gujarat, India

- Gujarati: રાણી સિપ્રીની મસ્જીદ
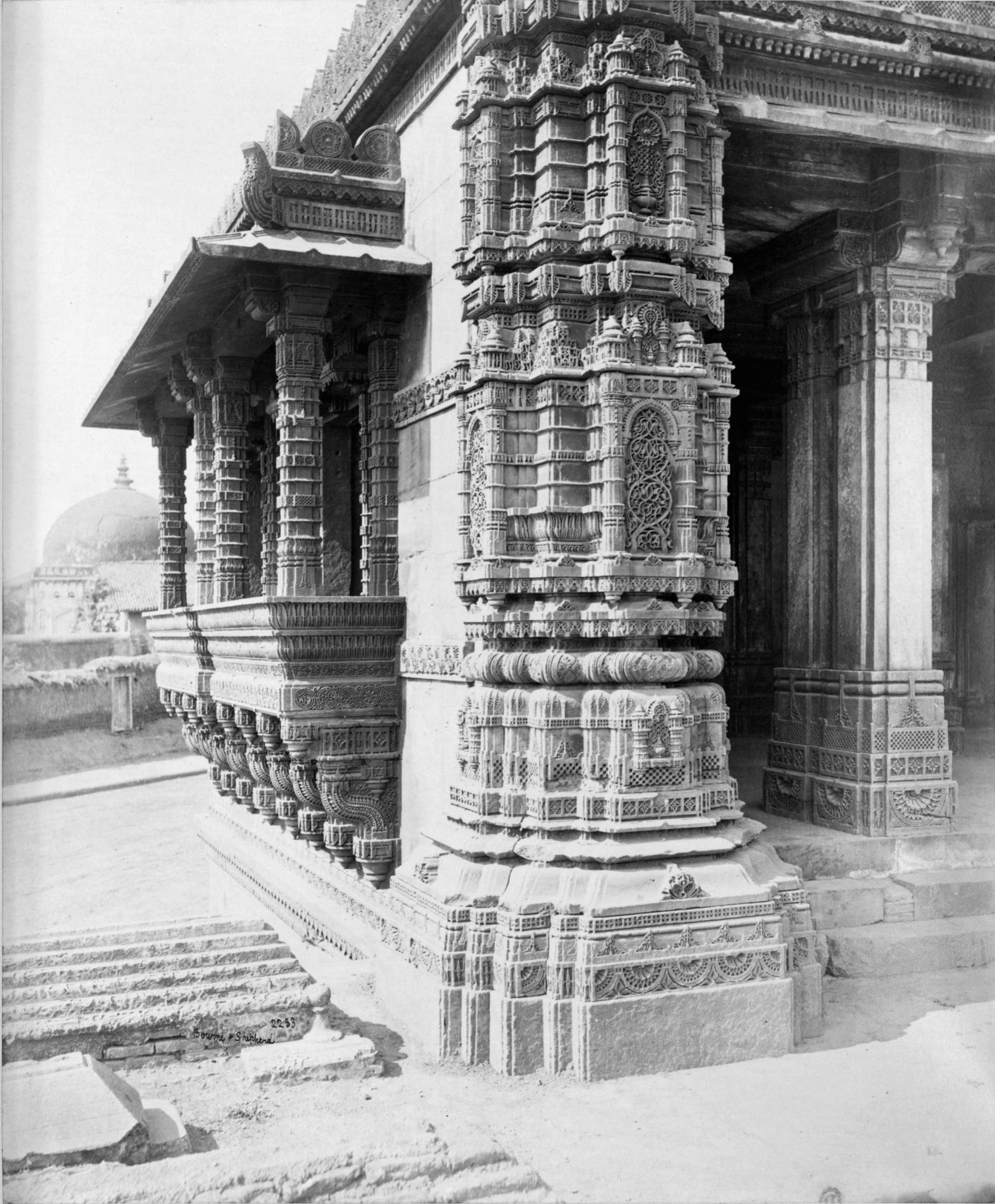
- Retouched image of a window and the minaret base, 1874 (source: Burgess, Bourne & Shepherd)

- Location in Ahmedabad

Religion
- Affiliation: Islam
- Ecclesiastical or organizational status: Mosque
- Status: Active

Location
- Location: Old Ahmedabad, Gujarat
- Country: India
- Interactive map of Rani Sipri's Mosque
- Coordinates: 23°01′02″N 72°35′25″E

Architecture
- Type: Mosque architecture
- Style: Indo-Islamic; Māru-Gurjara
- Completed: 1514

Specifications
- Length: 54 ft (16 m)
- Height (max): 50 ft (15 m)
- Dome: One
- Minaret: One

Monument of National Importance
- Official name: Mosque of Ala Vardi Khan
- Reference no.: N-GJ-34

Rani Sipri's Mosque (Gujarati: રાણી સિપ્રીની મસ્જીદ, romanized: Rani Sipri ni Masjid), also known locally as Masjid-e-nagina, and formerly known as Rani Asni's Mosque, is a mosque in the walled city of Ahmedabad, in the state of Gujarat in India. The structure is a Monument of National Importance.

== History ==
The mosque was commissioned in 1514 by Queen Sipri, the Hindu wife of Mahmud Begada, a sultan who ruled Gujarat. It is also known as Masjid-e-Nagina (Jewel of a Mosque) because of the intricate jali carvings on its walls. In 2006–7, the Ahmedabad Municipal Corporation proposed demolishing part of the monument in order to expand a road.

The mosque is named after the Hindu queen of Sultan Mahmud Begada, Rani Sabrāi or Sipri. She was also the mother of Abā Khān. The queen commissioned this mosque in 1514. After her death, the queen was buried in this mosque. Inside, there is also a jenana, a separate area for women to worship.

== Architecture ==
The jali screen work that includes flowering plants and trees is the prime attraction of this monument. Similar intricate jali work can be seen in other Indo-Islamic architectural monuments in the city like Siddi Sayyed Jali and Sarkhej Roza.

== Gallery ==
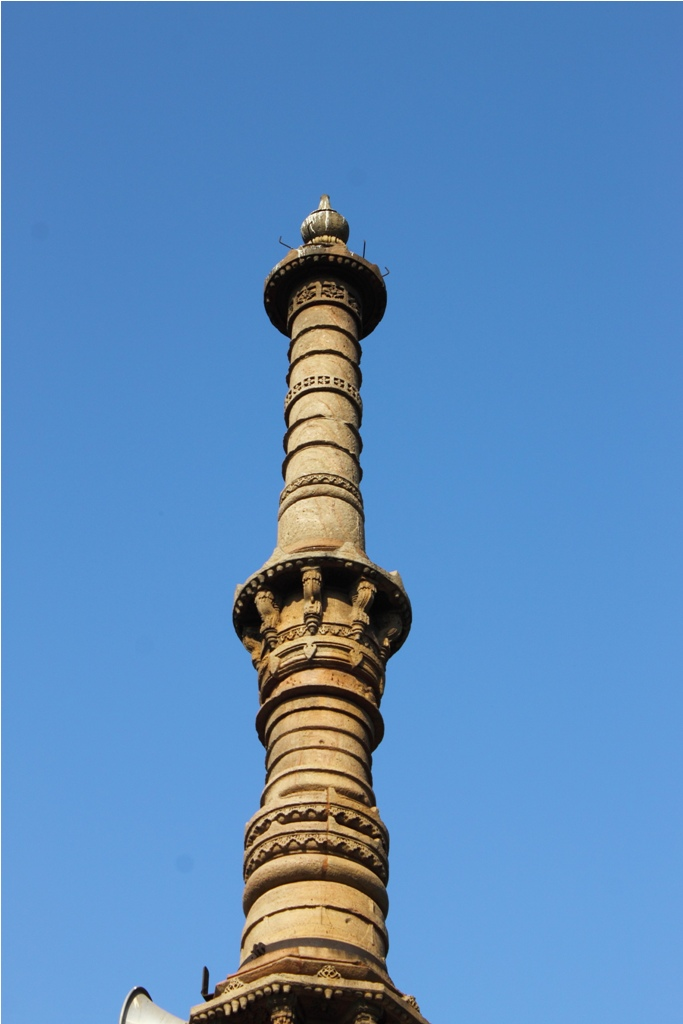
The minaret, in 2011

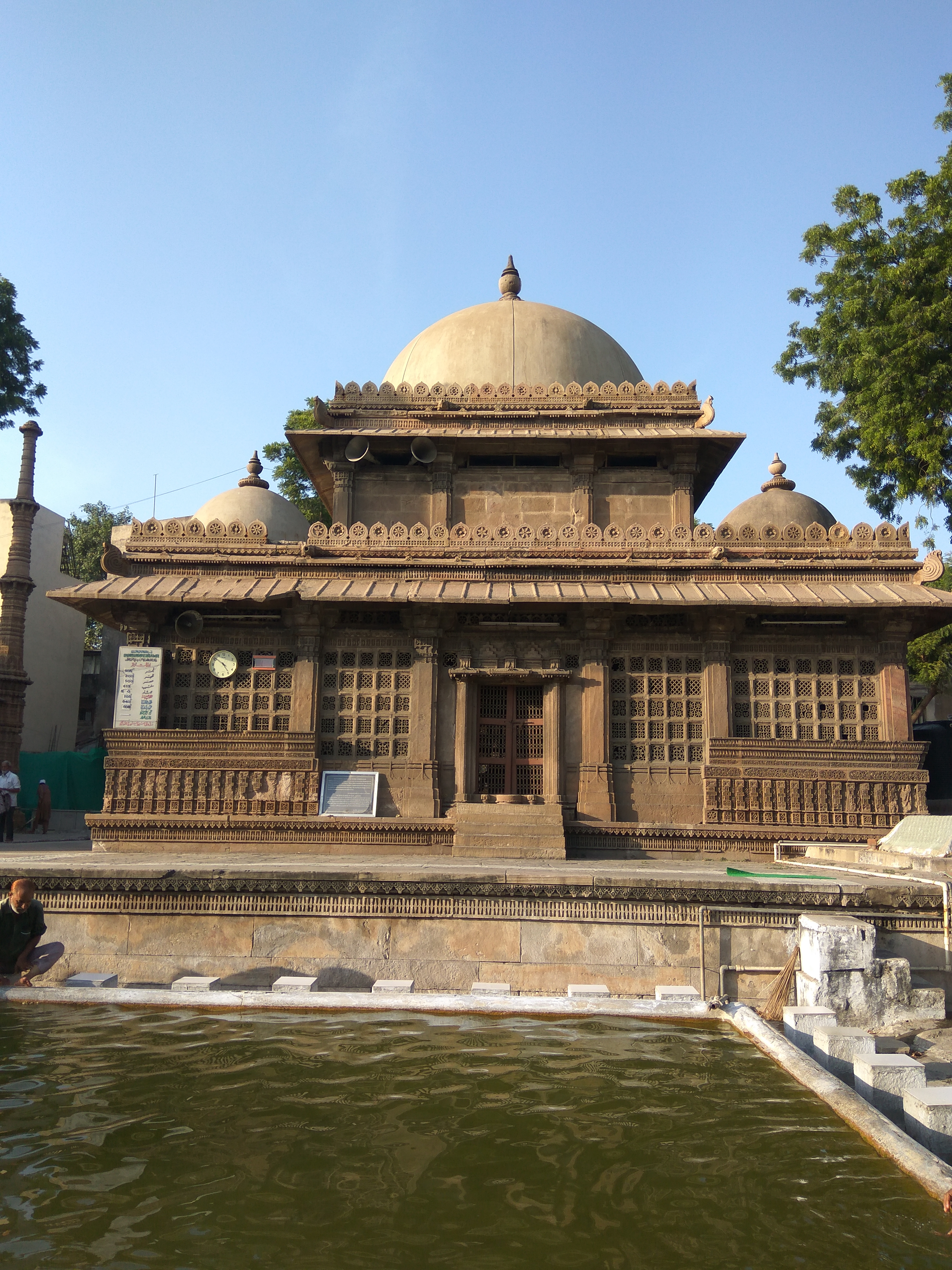
The mosque

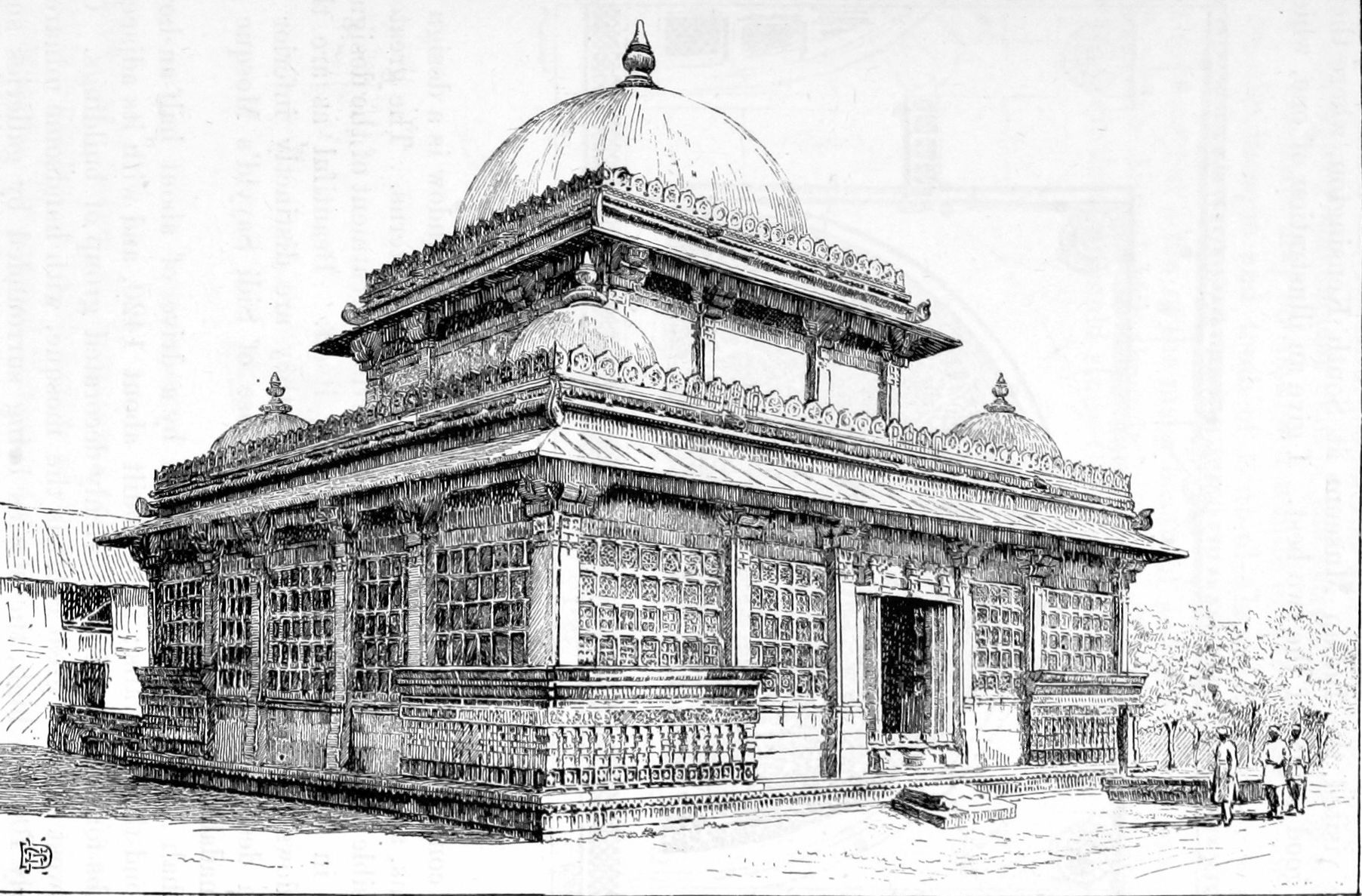
Tomb drawing, 1890

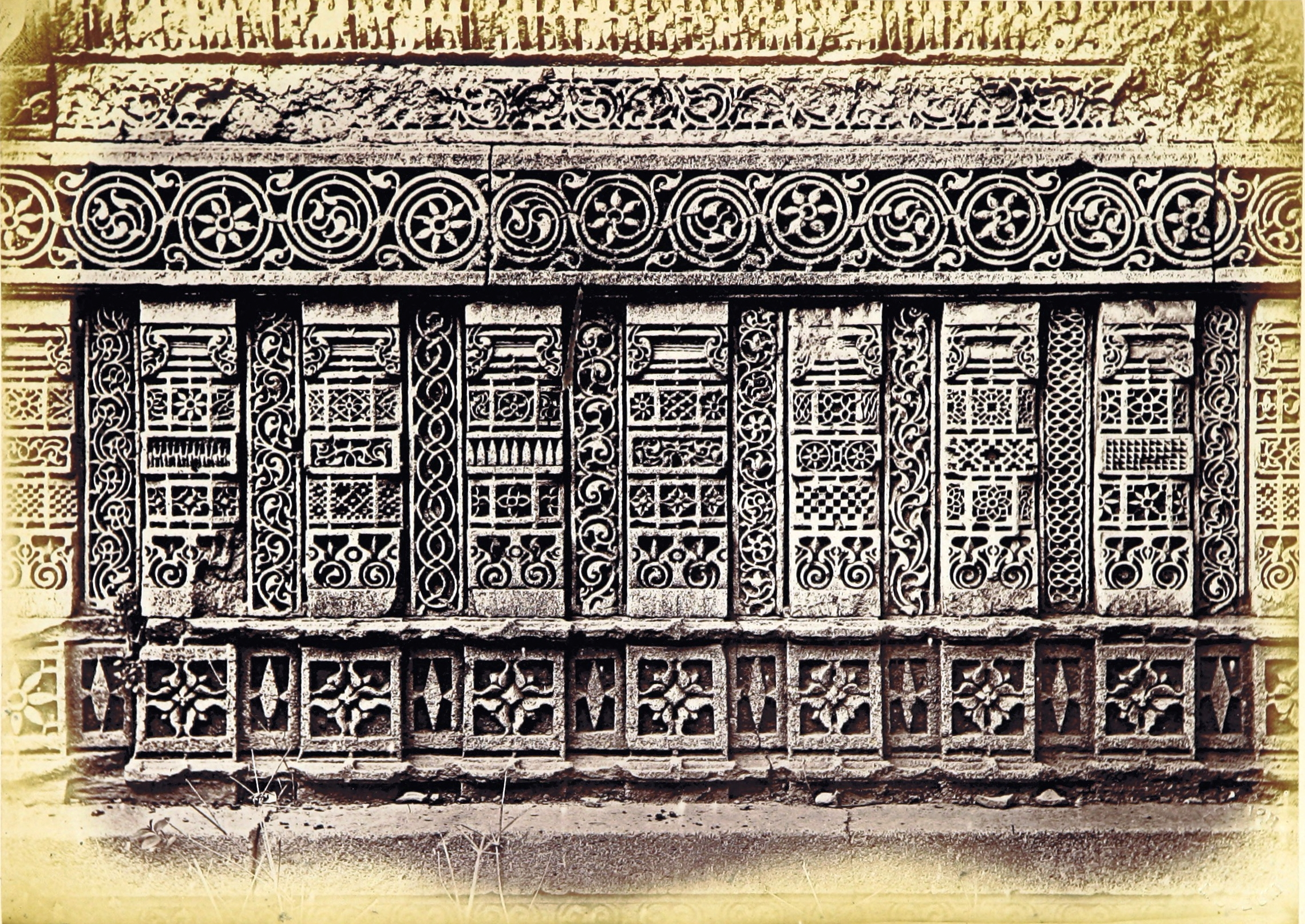
Details of carving on base of the tomb

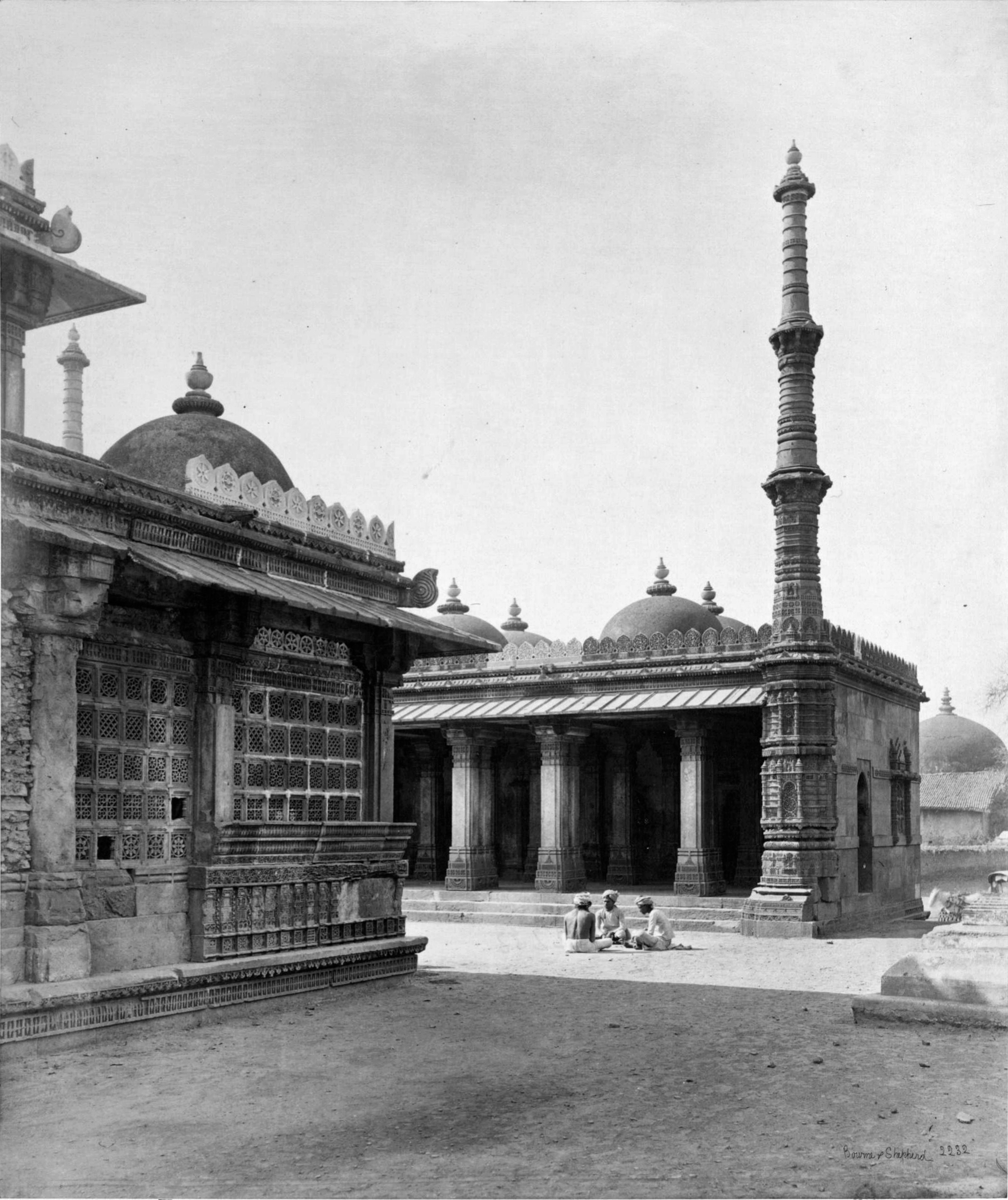
Mosque and tomb

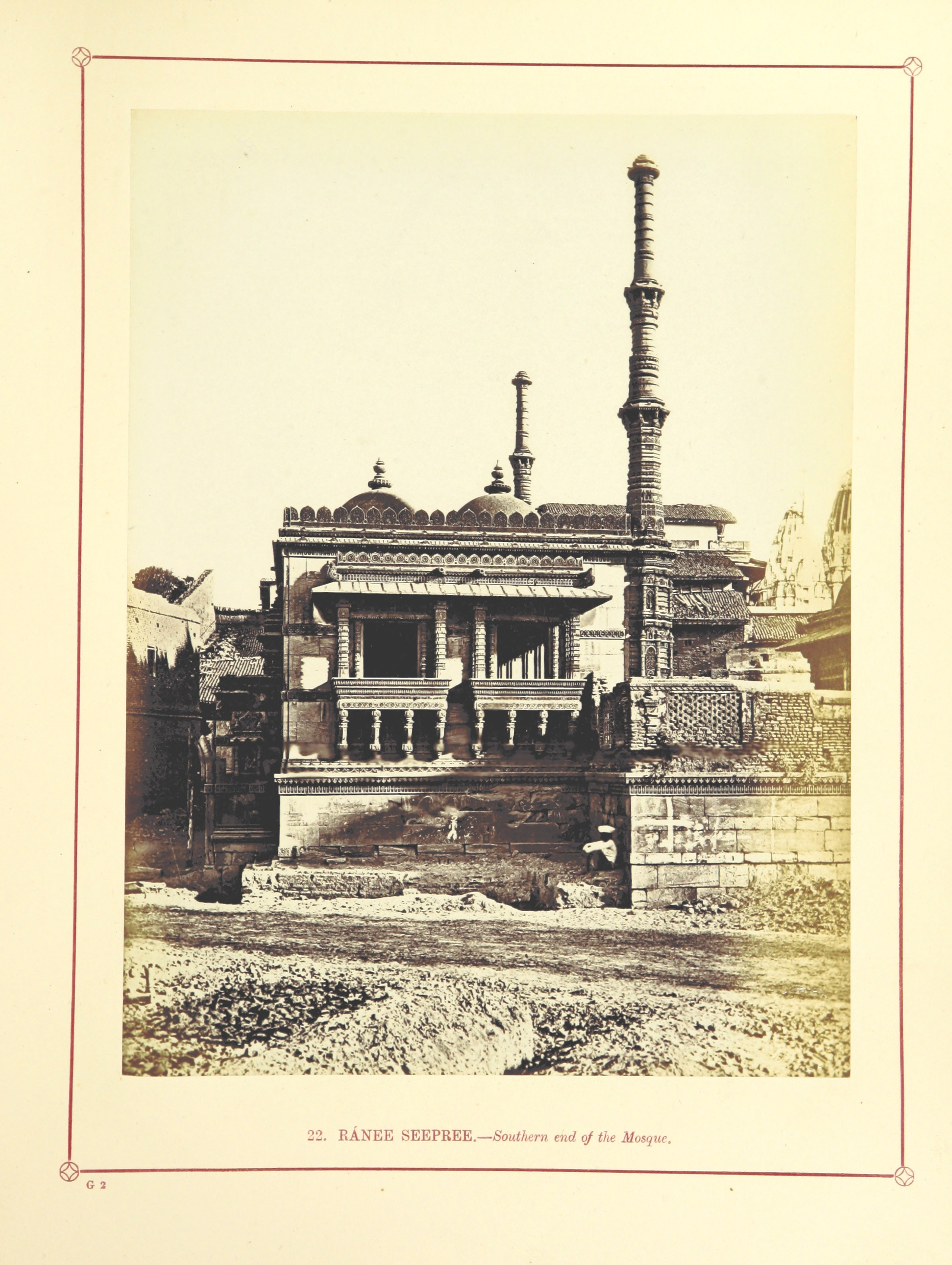
Southern end of the mosque, 1866

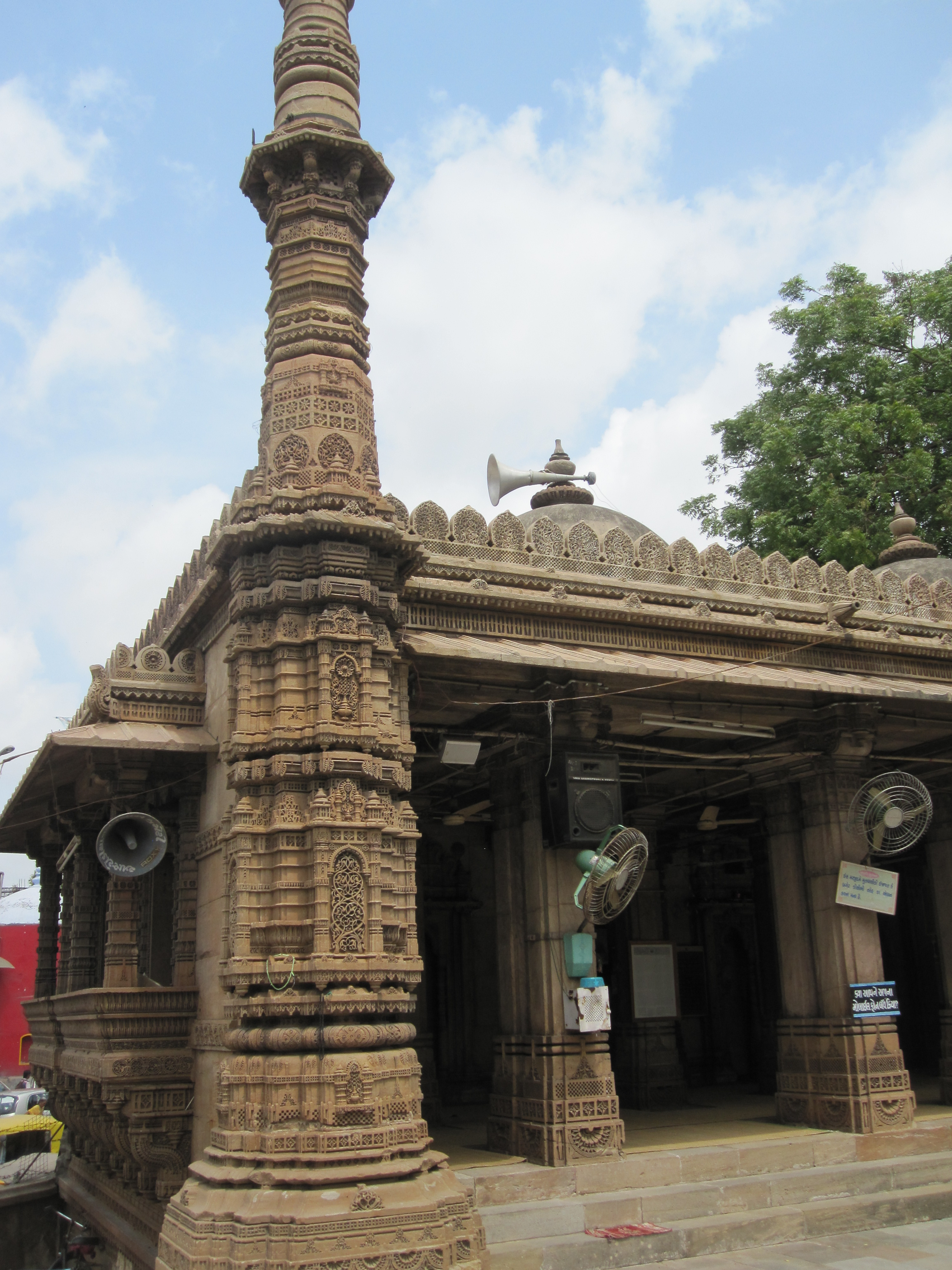
The mosque in Astodia

== See also ==
- Islam in India
- List of mosques in India
- List of Monuments of National Importance in Gujarat
