= Jama Mosque, Bhilai =

Sunni Islam mosque in Chhattisgarh, India

Jama Mosque
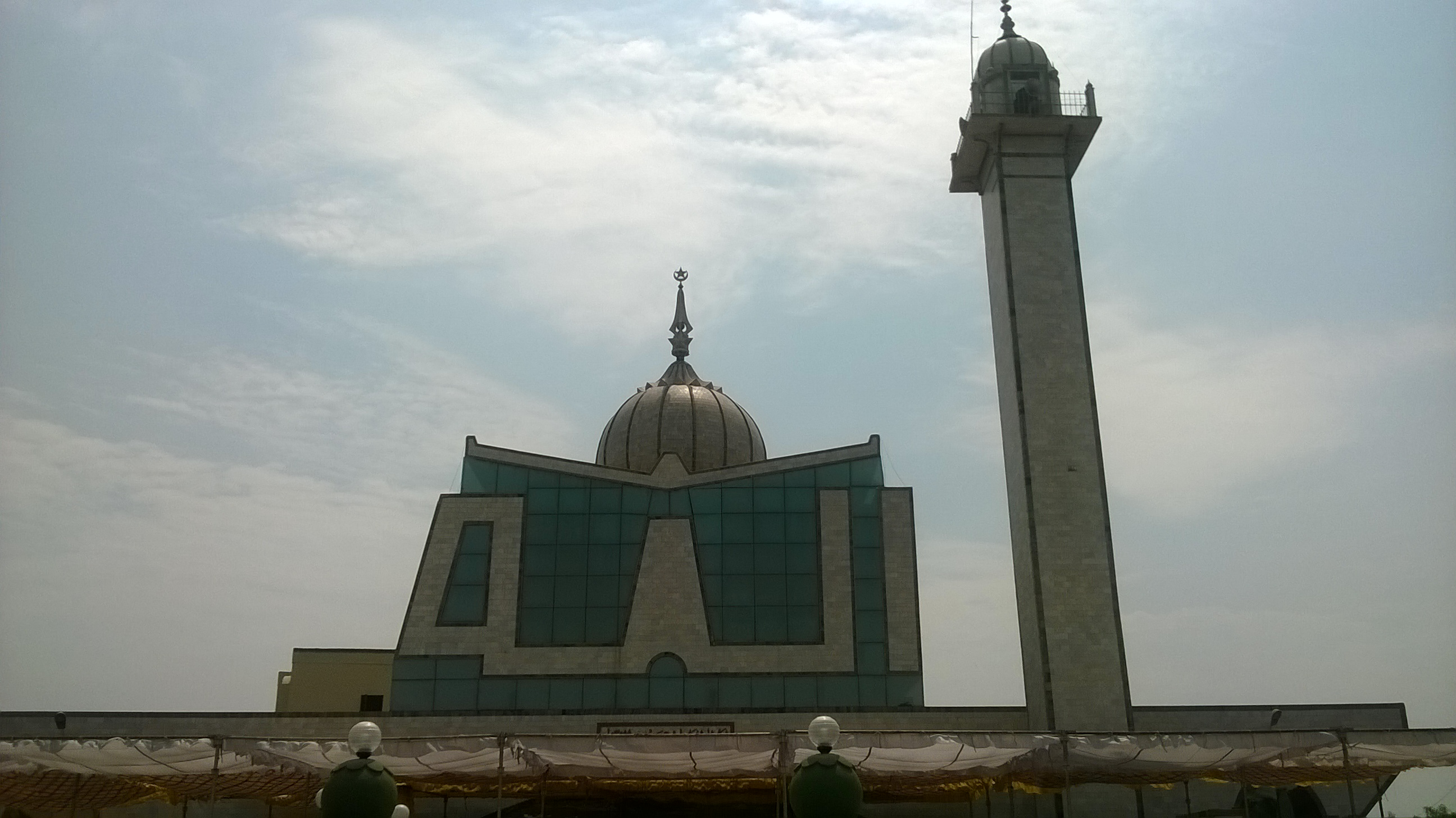

- Location of the mosque in Chhattisgarh

Religion
- Affiliation: Sunni Islam
- Ecclesiastical or organisational status: Mosque
- Leadership: Hafiz Iqbal Haider Anjum (Imam)
- Status: Active

Location
- Location: Bhilai, Durg, Chhattisgarh
- Country: India
- Coordinates: 21°12′05.1″N 81°21′00.2″E

Architecture
- Architect: Khairuddin Ahmad Siddiqui
- Type: Mosque architecture
- Groundbreaking: 1964
- Completed: 1967

Specifications
- Capacity: 3,000 worshipers
- Length: 36 m (118 ft)
- Width: 30 m (98 ft)
- Height (max): 18 m (59 ft)
- Dome: One
- Dome height (outer): 5 m (16 ft)

The Jama Mosque, or Jama Masjid, is a Sunni Islam mosque, located in Bhilai, Chhattisgarh, India. The mosque was completed in the 1960s and can accommodate 3,000 worshippers at a time and is one of the largest mosques in the state, and also in Asia. It is the first mosque in the world to be built in the shape of the word "Ya Allah" in Arabic script. It took three years for the construction of the mosque which was completed in 1967.

== History ==
Before the construction of the mosque, Bhilai Muslims used to pray in their respective localities and gathered only on Eid al-Fitr and Eid al-Adha to offer common prayers near Nehru house of Culture in sector-1, Bhilai.

The Muslim executives of Bhilai steel plant formed a committee and applied for its registration. It was registered as Bhilai Nagar Masjid Trust under the Madhya Pradesh Public Trust Act 1951. The Bhilai steel plant allotted a plot measuring 1,100 square metres (12,000 sq ft) in sector-6 to this committee for the mosque. The construction began in 1964 and was completed in 1967. The first Friday prayer was held in the new mosque on 31 March 1967.

== Architecture and design ==
The special design of the mosque has created a history in the world of Islamic architecture through its monumental elevation which forms an Arabic word Yā Allāh (یا الله). The 80 feet high minar shapes ‘Ya’ while the concrete walls of the first floor with a slab above in the shape of tashdeed projects ‘Allah’. The building is topped with a marble dome.

It was designed by the architect Khairuddin Ahmad Siddiqui, Siddiqui and associates, Hyderabad, Telangana.

The mosque is 18 metres (59 ft) high, including the 4.9-metre-high (16 ft) dome, and is 37 metres (120 ft) long and 30 metres (100 ft) wide. The Eid-gah adjacent to the mosque is 76 metres (250 ft) long and 70 metres (230 ft) wide. Marble tiles have been fixed inside and outside of the mosque’s minar. The mosque is maintained by the founding committee, the Bhilai Nagar Masjid Trust.

== Imams ==
Alhaj Hafiz Sayed Ajmaluddin Haider served as the first Imam of this Mosque from 1968 to 2013. Born in Patna in 1942, his family moved permanently to Durg in 1952. His father, Maulana Afzaluddin Haidar became Imam of Jama Masjid Durg since 1952 and his mazaar is in Supela Kabristan, Bhilai. Alhaj Hafiz Sayed Ajmaluddin Haider is affiliated to Qadiriyyah Chishtiya Ashrafiya order of Sufism and is educated from Darul Uloom Islamia Nagpur.

Hafiz Iqbal Haider Anjum is the current Imam of the mosque who commenced on 1 January 2014. He is educated from Jame Ashraf, Kichaucha Shareef, Faizabad in Uttar Pradesh.

== Welfare and development ==
A Muslim community hall is built near the mosque by the Bhilai Nagar masjid trust with the help of Muslims in Bhilai. The hall is 27 metres (90 ft) long, 13 metres (42 ft) wide and 6.7 metres (22 ft) high. A ladies’ hall has been partitioned out of it with approximately half of the total dimensions of the hall. The second floor is under construction and is estimated to be completed by the end of July 2015.

Representatives from non-Muslim communities, Sikh, Christian and Arya Samaj, visit the mosque every year to wish Muslims on the occasions of Eid conveying the spirit of inter-religious brotherhood and peace in Bhilai.

== See also ==
- Islam in India
- List of mosques in India
