= Mosque of Ala Vardi Khan =

Mosque in Haryana, India

Religion
- Affiliation: Islam
- Ecclesiastical or organizational status: Mosque
- Status: Active

Location
- Location: Gurgaon, Haryana
- Country: India

Architecture
- Style: Mughal
- Founder: Alivardi Khan
- Completed: 18th century
- Dome: 3

Monument of National Importance
- Official name: Mosque of Ala Vardi Khan
- Reference no.: N-HR-26

The Mosque of Ala Vardi Khan is a mosque, located near Gurgaon, in the state of Haryana, India. The mosque is a Monument of National Importance.

== Overview ==
The mosque was built by Nawab Alivardi Khan in 18th century, along with a sarai. Such combinations of mosques and sarais were common in the area and built every 18 kilometres (11 mi) on the journey from Delhi to Ajmer. The mosque is located 2 kilometres (1.2 mi) from the Old Tehsil Office, in Gurgaon.

== See also ==
- Islam in India
- List of mosques in India
