= Lal Masjid, Tijara =

Mosque in Tijara, Rajasthan, India

Lal Masjid
- Location of the mosque in Rajasthan

Religion
- Affiliation: Islam
- Ecclesiastical or organizational status: Mosque
- Status: Active

Location
- Location: Tijara, Rajasthan
- Country: India
- Interactive map of Lal Masjid
- Coordinates: 27°55′59″N 76°51′51″E

Architecture
- Type: Mosque architecture
- Style: Mughal
- Founder: Hindal Mirza
- Completed: 17th century

Specifications
- Length: 35 m (115 ft)
- Width: 12 m (40 ft)
- Dome: Three (once since collapsed)
- Minaret: Four
- Materials: Red stone

Monument of National Importance
- Official name: Tijara
- Designated: 19 April 1976
- Reference no.: N-RJ-145

The Lal Masjid (lit. 'Red Mosque') is a mosque located in Tijara, in the state of Rajasthan, India. It is listed as a monument of national importance.

== Background ==
The Lal Masjid' is so named due to its reddish colour, and is situated to the east of the town of Tijara. It was built by Hindal Mirza, who had received Tijara as a jagir from his father, the Mughal emperor Babur.

== Architecture ==
The mosque building is rectangular, measuring 35 metres (115 ft) by 12 metres (40 ft). There are fluted minarets at each of the four corners. The façade contains three arched doorways leading into the prayer hall. It was originally covered by three domes, with the central dome being larger than the others; as of 2024, the southern dome has collapsed. The remains of a pillared cupola can be seen atop the central dome.

The prayer-hall measures 30 metres (100 ft) by 7.6 metres (25 ft).

== See also ==
- Islam in India
- List of mosques in India
- List of Monuments of National Importance in Rajasthan
