= Chatta Masjid =

Congregational mosque in Gaya, Bihar, India

- छत्ता मस्जिद (Hindi) چھتہ مسجد (Urdu)
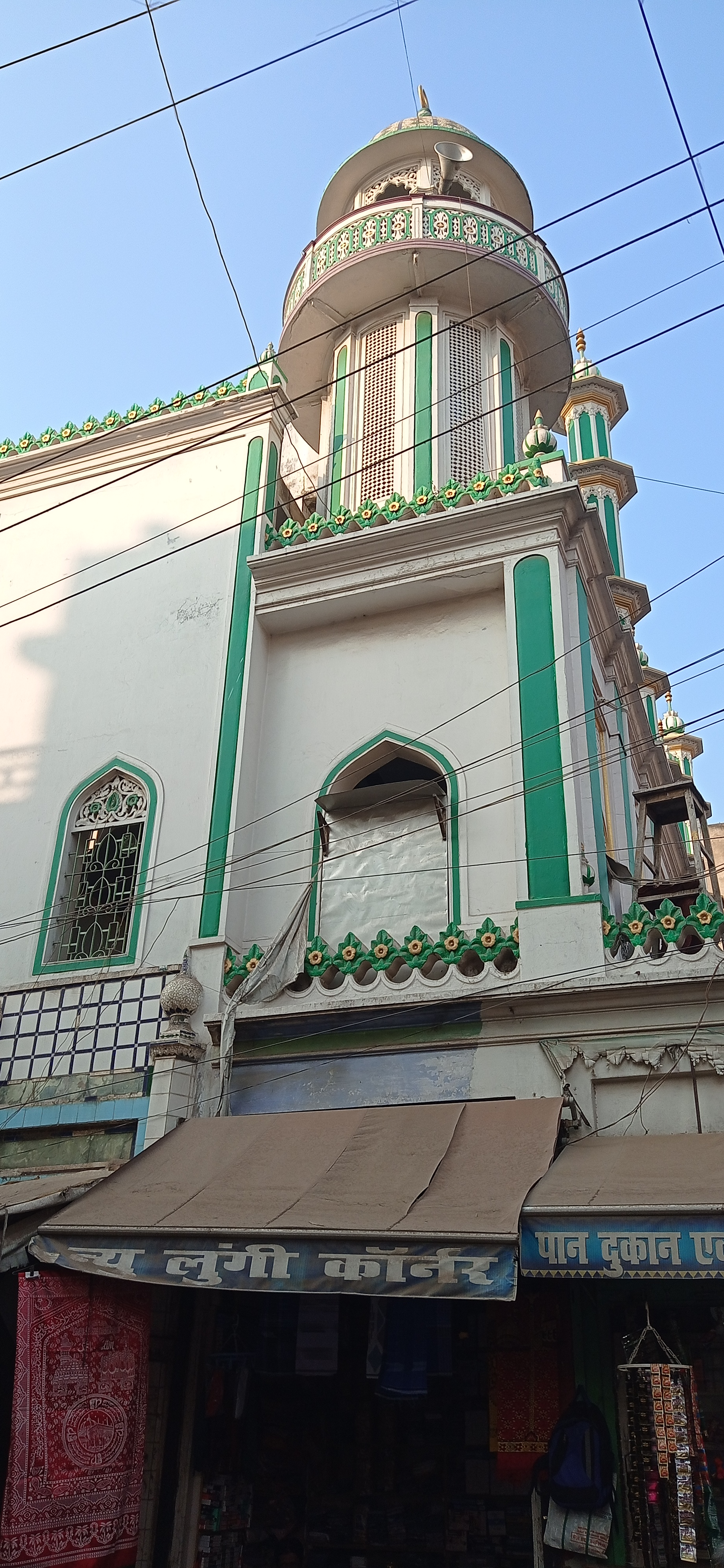
- Entrance to the Chatta Masjid, 2021.

Religion
- Affiliation: Islam

Location
- Location: Gaya
- Municipality: Gaya Nagar Nigam
- State: Bihar
- Country: India
- Interactive map of Chatta Masjid
- Coordinates: 24°47′44″N 85°0′29″E

Architecture
- Type: Mosque
- Style: Indo-Islamic

Chatta Masjid (Hindi: छत्ता मस्जिद, IAST: Chattā Masjida; Urdu: چھتہ مسجد, romanized: Chatta Masjid), also spelled as Chhatta Masjid, is a congregational mosque located in Dulhingunj neighborhood of Gaya, Bihar, India, close to Falgu river. Popular for being situated at a bustling marketplace, the mosque also serves as a landmark for nearby bakeries that sell traditional bakarkhanis and sheermals besides wholesale shops that import dates from the Middle East. The mosque usually gets crowded during Shab-e-Barat and serves as a local eidgah during the festive seasons of Eid al-Fitr and Eid al-Adha.

== COVID-19 lockdown and subsequent closures ==
After the outbreak of the COVID-19 pandemic, the Government of Bihar announced a complete state-wise lockdown from 22 March 2020 till 31 March 2020, and two days later on the evening of 24 March 2020, the Indian government announced nation-wide lockdown for the next 21 days till 14 April 2020. Chatta Masjid's nearby marketplace remained closed till late May 2021 while the premises of the mosque remained closed for visitors till late August 2021 when Bihar government eased restrictions during the Unlock 6.0 phase.
