= Saqlain Miyan =

Indian Muslim scholar (1947–2023)

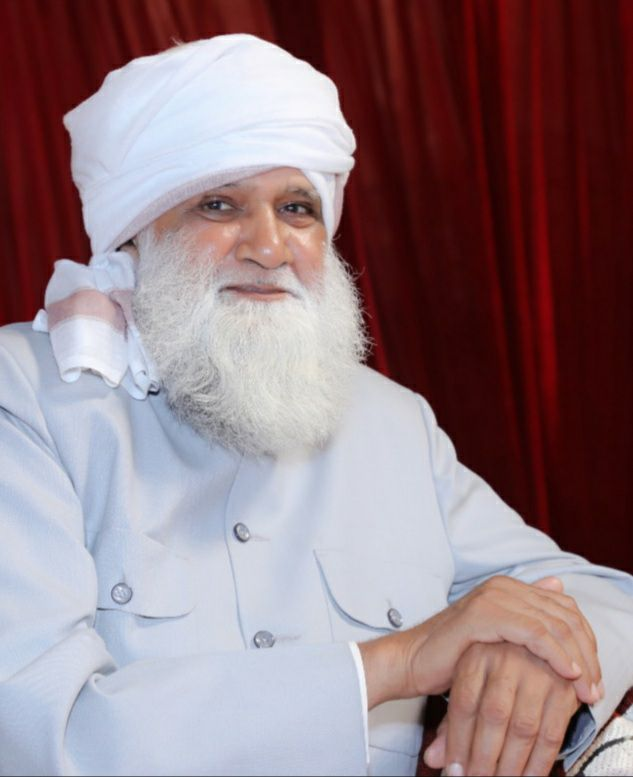

Sajjadanasheen of Khanqah Sharafatiya
- In office 1969 – 20 October 2023

Personal life
- Born: 13 March 1947
- Died: 20 October 2023 (aged 76) Bareilly, Uttar Pradesh
- Home town: Kakrala, Uttar Pradesh
- Region: India

Religious life
- Religion: Islam
- Denomination: Sunni
- Creed: Sufi

Saqlain Miyan (13 March 1947 – 20 October 2023) was an Indian Sufi scholar of Sunni Islam. He was the Sajjada Nasheen of Khanqah-e-Sharafatiya in Bareilly, Uttar Pradesh. He founded the Shah Saqlain Academy of India.

== Early life ==
Saqlain Miyan was born Hazrat Shah Saqlain Miya Huzur on 13 March 1947 in Kakrala, Uttar Pradesh. He was the grandson of Shah Sharafat Miyan.

He became a murid of Qadiriyya and Naqshbandi Silsila when he was only one day old by the hands of a Mawlana.

Saqlain Miyan was brought up in Bareilly with his two brothers, one of whom died on 17 September 2021.

In 1956, his father died. He became the Sajjada Nasheen of Dargah Sharafatiya in 1969 after the death of Sharafat Miyan.

== Death ==
Shah Saqlain Miyan Huzoor died on 20 October 2023 and was buried in Bareilly, India.

His Namaz-e-Janaza was held on 22 October 2023. It was led by his son Mohammad Ghazi Saqlaini Al Qadri in Islamia High School Maidan. He is buried in the Dargah Shah Sharafat Miyan along with his grandfather.
