= Lal Masjid, Delhi =

Mosque in Delhi, India

Lal Masjid
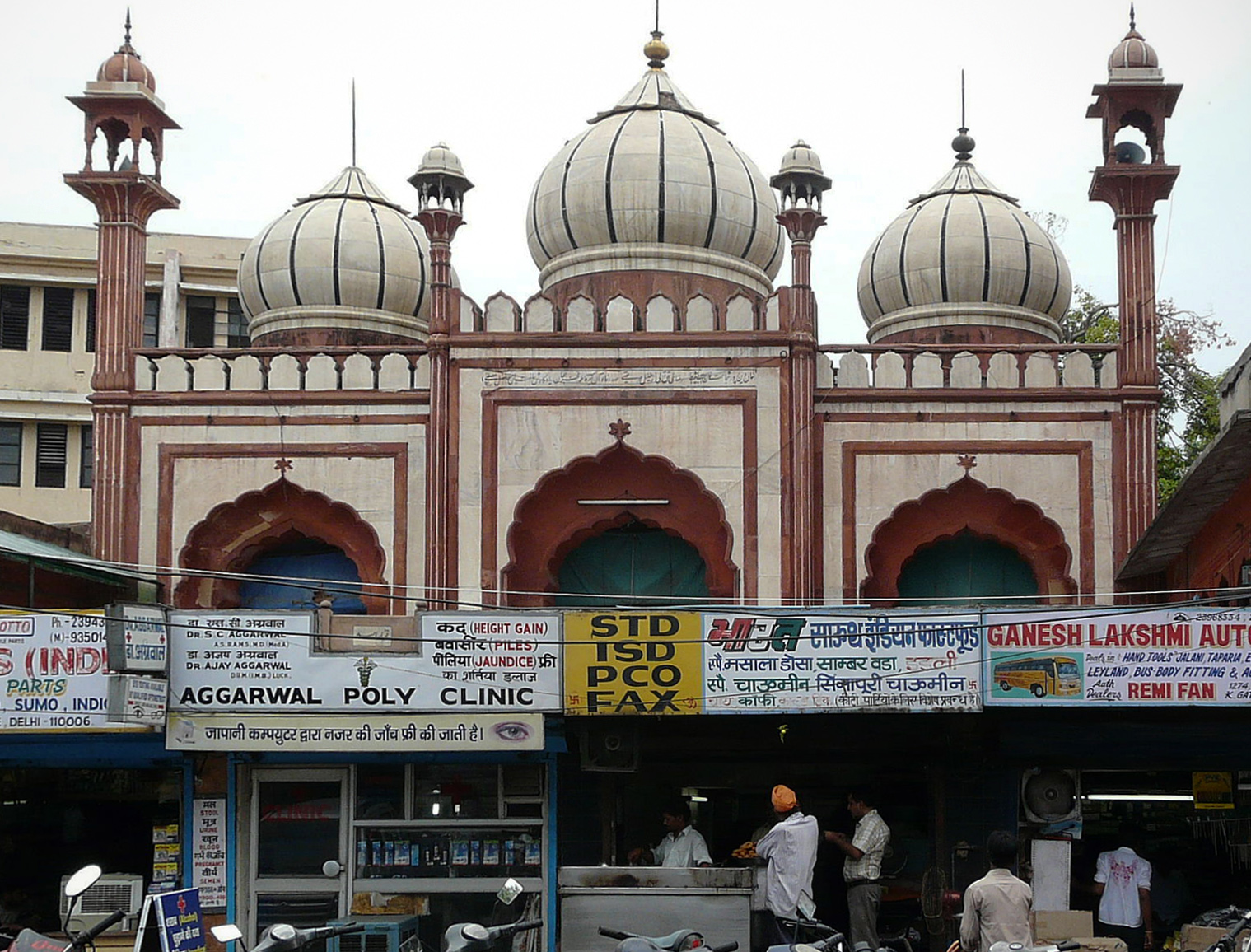
- The mosque, in 2009

- Location of the mosque in Central Delhi

Religion
- Affiliation: Islam
- Ecclesiastical or organisational status: Mosque
- Status: Active

Location
- Location: Old Delhi, Central Delhi, Delhi NCT
- Country: India
- Coordinates: 28°39′55″N 77°13′47″E

Architecture
- Type: Mosque architecture
- Style: Indo-Islamic
- Groundbreaking: 1728
- Completed: 1729

Specifications
- Dome: Three
- Minaret: Two
- Materials: Red sandstone; white marble

The Lal Masjid (lit. "Red Mosque") of Delhi, also known as the Fakr-ul Masjid (lit. "Pride of Mosques") or Sikandar Sahib's Masjid, is a mosque located in Bara Bazaar, near the Kashmiri Gate in Old Delhi, in Central Delhi, in India.

== History ==
The building was built in 1728 by Kaniz-i-Fatima (entitled Fakr-i-Jahan), in memory of her husband, Shujaat Khan, a noble in the court of Mughal emperor Aurangzeb. Colonel James Skinner repaired the mosque and its construction is sometimes misattributed to him.

Illustrations and descriptions of the mosque were included in Reminiscences of Imperial Delhi, by Sir Thomas Metcalfe, published in 1844.

In the 1857 Siege of Delhi the mosque was damaged, and has since been repaired.

== Architecture ==
The mosque sits on a raised plinth of approximately 12.2 by 7.3 metres (40 by 24 ft) and stands 2.5 metres (8.2 ft) above the adjacent shop-lined streets. The main complex consists of three rooms each with its own arched entryway. Two striped towers on either side of the center arch are mirrored by the mosque's two minarets standing at the rear corners of building. Behind a decorated parapet on the roof of the mosque sit three white and black marble domes. The building's prominent use of red sandstone and white marble is considered unusual for the period, though many of its other features, including its minarets and domes, are closely modelled off of the major mosques of Delhi including the nearby Jama Masjid.

== See also ==
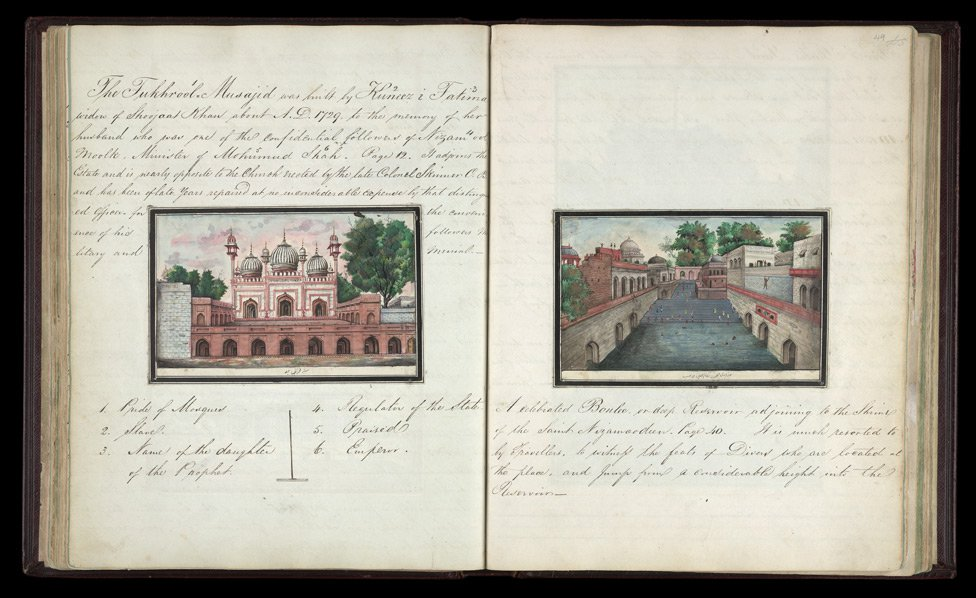
Illustration of the mosque (left) from Reminiscences of Imperial Delhi

- Islam in India
- List of mosques in India
