= Kali Masjid, Bidar =

Mosque in Bidar, Karnataka, India

Kali Masjid
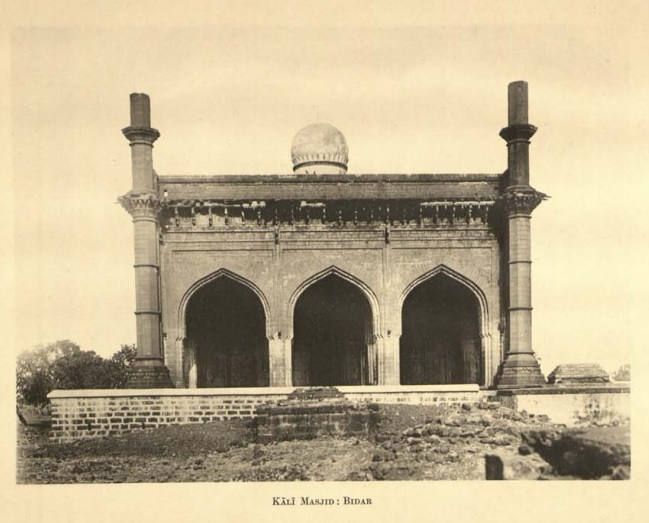
- The mosque, in 1933

- Location of the mosque in Karnataka

Religion
- Affiliation: Islam
- Ecclesiastical or organizational status: Mosque
- Status: Active

Location
- Location: Bidar, Karnataka
- Country: India
- Interactive map of Kali Masjid

Architecture
- Type: Mosque architecture
- Style: Bahmani
- Completed: c. 16th century

Specifications
- Dome: One
- Minaret: Two (incomplete)

The Kali Masjid is a mosque in the town of Bidar, in the state of Karnataka, India.

== History ==
The mosque does not bear an inscription, and thus, the exact date of its construction is unknown. However, from the style of its construction, it was probably built in the first half of the 16th century, during the early Barid Shahi period.

== Architecture ==
The mosque is located to the south-west of the Bidar Railway Station. There is also a well within the premises, which is a later addition.

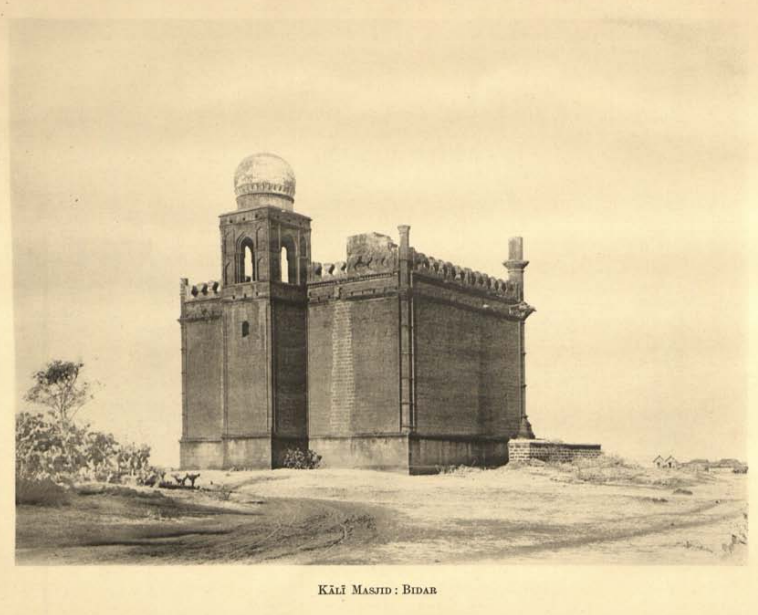
Kali Masjid, viewed from the south-western side

=== Exterior ===
The mosque is built of trap masonry laid in lime. The façade has three arched openings, and is flanked by two incomplete minarets. The minarets were either unfinished, or destroyed by vandalism at some later date. The minarets are octagonal in shape and rise from square bases.

Above the arches are two bands of polished hornblende in the form of a frieze. An inscription was probably present here, detailing the date of completion of the mosque and its founder. Above this are the brackets which support the chajja. A trefoil patterned parapet wall rises above the structure. This parapet only survives at the side and back walls.

A dome on a square base rises above the western end of the building, right above the mihrab. The square base of the dome has open arches on all four sides, similar to the tomb of Ali Barid Shah. This chimney-like dome above the mihrab is similar to the domes in Al-Zaytuna Mosque and other mosques in North Africa.

=== Interior ===
The mosque is divided into six bays by the means of pillars, upon which rest arches that support the ceiling. The ceiling, which is elaborately decorated with plaster work, is casket-shaped in the middle bay at the rear, and shallow-domed in all other bays. The interior measures 13.97 metres (45 ft 10 in) by 11 metres (35 ft). The prayer niche has a decagonal base.

== See also ==
- Islam in India
- List of mosques in India
