= Kakrala =

- City
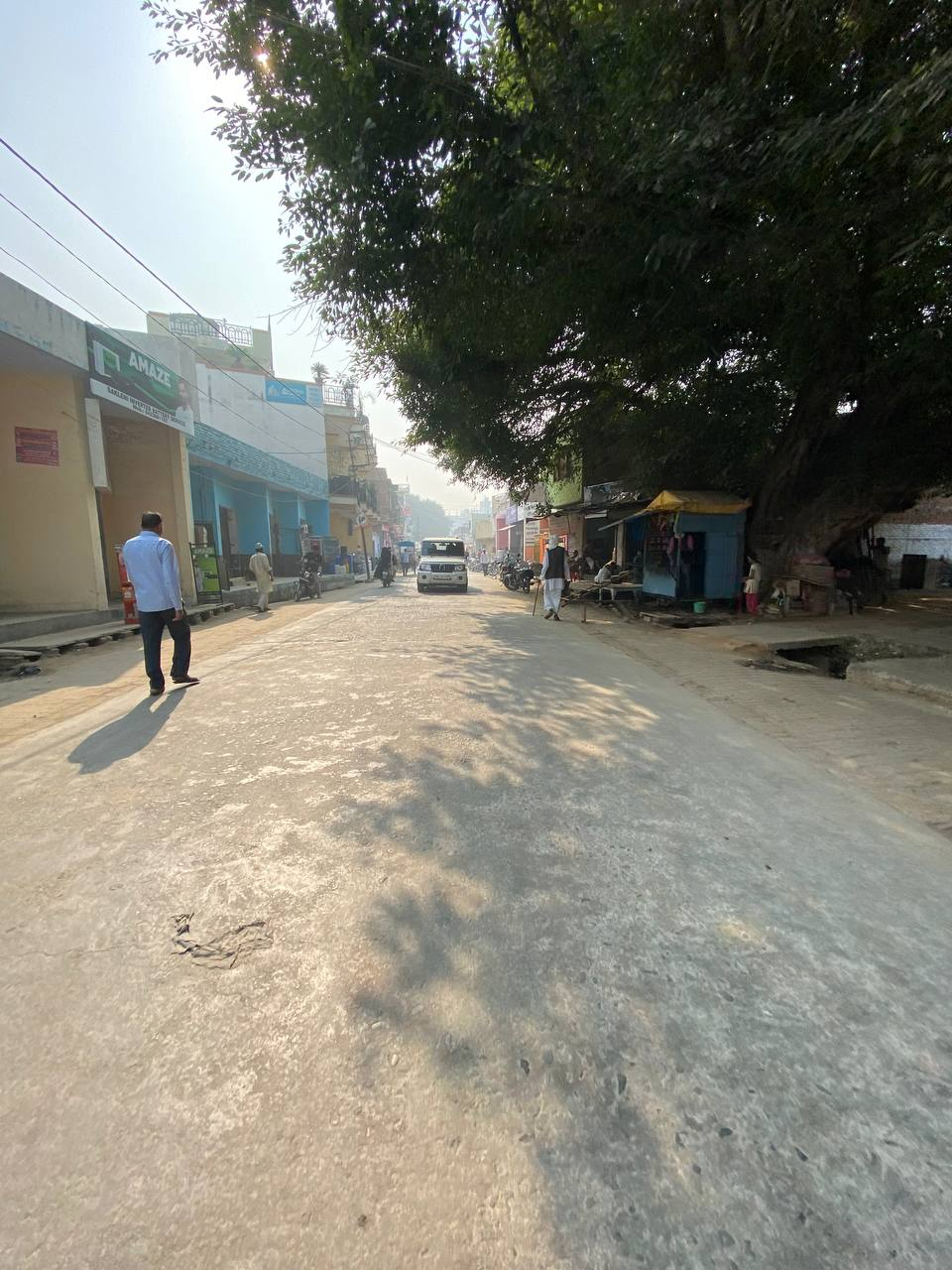
- Kakrala-Budaun Road

- Location in Uttar Pradesh, India
- Coordinates: 27.89222°N 79.19528°E
- Country: India
- State: Uttar Pradesh
- District: Badaun
- Established: About 450 years ago..

Government
  - Chairman of Municipal Board: Intkhab Mumtaz Saqlaini
  - MLA: Himanshu Yadav
  - MP: Neeraj Kushwaha Maurya

Area
  - Total: 39 km^{2} (15 sq mi)
- Elevation: 160 m (520 ft)

Population (2011)
  - Total: 40,081
  - Density: 1,000/km^{2} (2,700/sq mi)

hindi. Urdu Kokri
  - Official: English, Urdu, Hindi
- Time zone: UTC+5:30 (IST)
- PIN: 243637
- Vehicle registration: UP-24

Kakrala is a city and municipal board in Badaun district in the Indian state of Uttar Pradesh. Intikhaab Mumtaaj Saqlaini is the newly elected chairman of the town.

== Geography ==
Kakrala is located at 27.89222°N 79.19528°E. This place is situated in Budaun, Uttar Pradesh, India, its geographical coordinates are 27° 54' 0" North, 79° 12' 0" East and its original name (with diacritics) is Kakrāla. The average temperature in winter is 25 °C (77 °F), and can reach up to 38 °C (100 °F) in summer.

== Demographics ==
At the 2011 census, Kakrala had a population of 105,000. Males constituted 52.71% of the population while females constituted 47.28%. Kakrala has an average literacy rate of 57.96%, lower than the national average of 74.04%: male literacy is 61.69%, and female literacy is 53.76%.
