= GNH =

GNH may refer to:

- Greenhithe railway station, England
- Grey Nuns Hospital (disambiguation)
- Gross National Happiness
- Guru Nanak Home for Handicapped Children, Ranchi, India
- Lere language
