= List of things named after Guru Nanak =

This is a list of things named after the first guru of Sikhs, Guru Nanak Dev Ji.

== Educational Institutions ==
=== Educational Institutions in India ===
==== University ====
- Guru Nanak Dev University, Amritsar
- Guru Nanak Open University Patiala

==== Colleges and Institutes ====
- Guru Nanak Institute of Management and Technology (GNIMT) Ludhiana
- Gujranwala Guru Nanak Khalsa College (Boys) Ludhiana
- Gujranwala Guru Nanak Khalsa College (Girls) Ludhiana
- Guru Nanak Girls College, Model Town (Girls) Ludhiana
- Guru Nanak National College (Girls) Nakodar
- Guru Nanak National College (Boys) Nakodar
- Guru Nanak Dev University, Amritsar
- Guru Nanak Dev Engineering College, Ludhiana
- Guru Nanak Dev Engineering College, Bidar
- Guru Nanak Khalsa College (King's Circle), Mumbai
- Guru Nanak Dev Dental College and Research Institute, Sunam
- Guru Nanak Engineering College, Ibrahimpatnam, RR District, Andhra Pradesh
- Guru Nanak Institute of Technology (GNIT), Ibrahimpatnam
- Guru Nanak College, Chennai
- Guru Nanak Dev Institute of Technology, Sector-15, Rohini, Delhi
- Guru Nanak college, Firozpur cantt, Punjab, India
- Guru Nanak Institute of Engineering & Technology, Nagpur
- Guru Nanak Dev Polytechnic College, Ludhiana
- Guru Nanak Khalsa College, Yamuna Nagar
- Sri Guru Nanak Dev Khalsa College, Dev Nagar, Karol Bagh, New Delhi
- Guru Nanak College of Education, Punjabi Bagh, Road No. 75, New Delhi
- Guru Nanak Institute of Management, New Delhi (GNIM)

==== Schools ====
- Guru Nanak Public School, Punjabi Bagh, New Delhi
- Guru Nanak Public School, Sector 36, Chandigarh
- Guru Nanak Institute of Dental Sciences and Research, Kolkata.

=== Educational Institutions outside India ===
- Guru Nanak Sikh Academy, London, England
- Baba Guru Nanak University, Nankana Sahib, Pakistan

== Gurdwaras ==
- Gurdwara Nanak Jhira Sahib, BIDAR, Karnataka, India
- Gurdwara Guru Nanak Darbar - Medford, MA
- Guru Nanak NSJ, Soho Road, Birmingham
- Guru Nanak Darbar, Dubai UAE
- Guru Nanak Khalsa College Matunga, Mumbai 19.
- Gurdwara Sahib Klang, Malaysia
- Gurdwara Guru Nanak Sahib, Brussels (Vilvoorde) Belgium
- Sri Guru Nanak Sat Sangh Sabha Gurudwara, Chennai

== Others ==
- Guru Nanak Dev Thermal Plant, Bathinda
- Guru Nanak Stadium, Ludhiana
- Guru Nanak Home for Handicapped Children
- Guru Nanak pura, Gujranwala, Punjab, Pakistan.
- Guru Nanak Sacred Forests (Guru Nanak Bagichi), Mathura

== See also ==
- Sikh gurus
- Sikh religious philosophy
