= Ujlam =

Ujalamb
- village
- Location in Karnataka, India Ujalamb (India)
- Coordinates: 17.86°N 76.95°E
- Country: India
- State: Karnataka
- District: Bidar
- Talukas: Basavakalyan

Population (2001)
  - Total: 5,004

Languages
  - Official: Kannada
- Time zone: UTC+5:30 (IST)

Ujalamb is a village in the southern state of Karnataka, India. It is located in the Basavakalyan taluk of Bidar district.

== Demographics ==
As of the 2001 India census, Ujalamb had a population of 5,004 with 2,528 males and 2,476 females.

== See also ==
- Bidar
- Districts of Karnataka
