= GNDEC =

GNDEC may stand for:

In education:

- Guru Nanak Dev Engineering College, Ludhiana, engineering institution of Punjab named after first guru of Sikhs
- Guru Nanak Dev Engineering College, Bidar, engineering college of Karnataka with same name
