= Bemalkheda =

Bemalkheda Earlier known as Vimalkheda
- village
- Nickname: Bemalgi
- Location in Karnataka, India Bemalkheda (India)
- Coordinates: 17.77°N 77.14°E
- Country: India
- State: Karnataka
- District: Bidar
- Talukas: Chitguppa

Government
  - Type: Gram
  - Body: panchayat[Bemalkheda]

Population (2011)
  - Total: 7,834

Languages
  - Official: Kannada
- Time zone: UTC+5:30 (IST)
- Postal code: 585227

Bemalkheda is a village in the southern state of Karnataka, India. It is located in the Chitguppa taluk of Bidar district in Karnataka, at a distance of 40 km from Bidar district.

== Demographics ==
As of 2001 India census, Bemalkheda had a population of 7716 with 3973 males and 3743 females.

== See also ==
- Bidar
- Districts of Karnataka
