= Shaheen Group of Institutions =

Education Institute In Bidar Shaheen Nagar Hyderabad Ring Road, Karnataka India

- Type: Private
- Industry: Private education
- Founded: 1989 (37 years ago) in Bidar, India
- Headquarters: Hyderabad Road, Bidar, Karnataka, India 585403
- Area served: India; Saudi Arabia
- Services: Secondary and tertiary education
- Owner: Dr. Abdul Qadeer (Chairman, President, and Founder)
- Number of employees: 1,000+
- Subsidiaries: Shaheen Colleges; Shaheen Coaching Institutions for JEE and NEET
- Website: shaheengroup.org

The Shaheen Group of Institutions is a group of private secondary and tertiary educational institutions founded by Dr. Abdul Qadeer, in Bidar, Karnataka, India. The group includes several schools, PU colleges, and graduation colleges in 13 Indian states, and one college in Saudi Arabia. The Group also provide coaching for NEET & JEE Mains, JEE advanced, UPSC, and similar programs, and the Group's NEET-aspirants have been successful in gaining admission into various prominent medical colleges including AIIMS Delhi.

== History ==
The Shaheen Group of Institutions was started in 1989 by Dr. Abdul Qadeer, a civil engineer. Qadeer was looking for an education institute for his younger brother. However, when he was unable to find a school that met his expectations, he started the first Shaheen Group institution, in Bidar, with just 17 students.

== Locations ==
The Shaheen Group has three campuses in the Bidar city, with multiple schools and colleges with a resident capacity of 3,500 students. It has separate campuses for male and female students, where approximately 16,000 students from 23 different states of India are studying.

The Group has approximately 45 branches in India, in the states of Andhra Pradesh, Assam, Bihar, Delhi, Gujarat, Jharkhand, Karnataka, Kerala, Madhya Pradesh, Maharashtra, Telangana, and Uttar Pradesh; and in September 2024 launched its first international academy, located in Saudi Arabia.

== Philanthropy ==
In 2024, the Shaheen Group signed an agreement with the Archaeological Survey of India to assist with preservation of the Mahmud Gawan Madrasa, a 15th-century former Islamic madrasa in Bidar, in partial ruins.
