= Ravinder Singh (author) =

Indian writer and software engineer

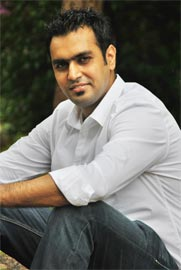
- Ravinder Singh
- Born: 4 February 1982 (age 44); Calcutta, West Bengal, India
- Education: Indian School of Business, Hyderabad
- Occupations: Writer, entrepreneur
- Writing career
- Genre: Fiction
- Notable work: I Too Had a Love Story

Ravinder Singh (born 4 February 1982) is an Indian software engineer and author of nine novels — I Too Had a Love Story, Can Love Happen Twice?, Like it happened Yesterday, Love Stories That Touched My Heart, Tell Me A Story, Your Dreams are Mine Now, This Love That Feels Right, Will You Still Love Me? and The Belated Bachelor Party. He started his career as an IT professional in Infosys. His girlfriend died in 2007 before they got formally engaged. He adapted his own story into his first novel I Too Had a Love Story which was published in 2008. Writing the book helped him cope with the tragedy in his life. This novel was reviewed by N R Narayana Murthy, Chairman Emeritus of Infosys Technologies, who called it "Simple, honest and touching".

== Early life ==
Singh was born in a Sikh family in Calcutta, West Bengal and brought up in Burla, Orissa. He completed his schooling at Guru Nanak Public School, Sambalpur. He received a Bachelor of Engineering in computer science engineering from Guru Nanak Dev Engineering College in Karnataka. He did his MBA at Indian School of Business in Hyderabad. He was working as a Sr. Program Manager at Microsoft when he decided to become a full-time author.

== Writing career ==
Singh's debut novel is based on a real-life incident when he met a girl, how his romance flourished and then how it came to an unfortunate end, before he could propose marriage to her. After a six-month search, an editing team sent the manuscript to the publisher Srishti, who published the book. The book was unveiled at a press conference in Chandigarh. An audio version of the novel I Too Had a Love Story was also launched in mid-2011. After the release of his first book in 2008 ravinder singh books list has grown richer and richer. This novel was also published in Kannada language, entitled Nannadu Ondu prema kathe.

"After the unfortunate incident, I was looking for a reason to live. And I started to pen down the moments I had been through."

"I can't deny that. I had to go back in time, close my eyes, relive the moments, tears rolled down and I wrote the words."

— Ravinder Singh talking at the launch of I Too Had a Love Story.

== Novels ==
1. I Too Had a Love Story (2007)
2. Can love happen twice? (2011)
3. Love Stories That Touched My Heart (2012)
4. Like it Happened Yesterday (2013)
5. Your Dreams Are Mine Now (2014)
6. Tell me a Story (2015)
7. This Love That Feels Right (2016)
8. Will You Still Love Me? (2018)
9. The Belated Bachelor Party (2019)
10. You Are All I Need (2020) (Editor)
11. Write Me A Love Story (2021)

== Entrepreneur ==
Ravinder Singh ventured into book publishing in the year 2015 with his publication house Black Ink.

=== Books by Black Ink ===
1. A Good Girl — By Chandana Roy
2. Making Of Babaji Inc — By Shravya Bhinder
3. The Guest — By Mitali Meelan
4. Three Marketeers — By Ajeet Sharma
