= Guru Nanak Dev Engineering College, Bidar =

Guru Nanak Dev Engineering College
- Motto: Essence of Wisdom is Service of Humanity
- Established: August 1980 (46 years ago)
- Founder: S. Joga Singh Ji
- Chairman: S. Balbir Singh
- Principal: Dr. Veena S. Soraganvi
- Students: 2800
- Location: Bidar, Karnataka, India; 17°53′48.3″N 77°30′40.4″E
- Website: gndecb.ac.in

Guru Nanak Dev Engineering College (abbreviation GNDEC) is a centre of technical education, in Bidar, Karnataka. It was established in the August 1980 by the Prabandhak Committee Gurudwara, Sri Nanak Jhira Saheb, Bidar. The college is approved by the All India Council for Technical Education (AICTE).

== History ==
Initially Guru Nanak Dev Engineering college was affiliated to Karnataka University, Dharwad. When Gulbarga University was created, it came under the jurisdiction of Gulbarga University, Gulbarga.

Now the college is affiliated to Visvesvaraya Technological University, Belgaum and approved by All India Council for Technological Education (AICTE), New Delhi and accredited by National Board of Accreditation (NBA), New Delhi.

Sardar Joga Singh, President of Nanak Jhira Trust, established the premier institute in the year 1980. The college started with an annual intake of 120 students, in three disciplines, and as of 2009 had an annual intake of 570 students in seven undergraduate disciplines and one master's discipline. It currently has 2800 students.

The college has an Administrative building, Auditorium, Central Library, Laboratories, Workshops, Seminar Halls, Digital class room and Hostel accommodation. The college has stringent intake standards. A Candidate who has passed the Second Year Pre-University or XII standard or equivalent examination with Physics, Chemistry, Mathematics, and Bio Technology and obtained at least 60% aggregate marks in these subjects is eligible.

== Departments ==
- Computer Science Engineering
- Information Science and Engineering
- Electronics and Communication Engineering
- Mechanical Engineering
- Electrical and Electronics Engineering
- Artificial Intelligence and Machine Learning
- Computer Science & Engineering (Data Science)
- Civil Engineering
- Master of Business Administration
- Master of Technology

== Notable alumni ==
- Ravinder Singh, (author) of I Too Had a Love Story Can, Love Happen Twice? "Like it happened Yesterday" and Your Dreams are Mine Now. New book "tell me a story"
- Jaideep Sahni, Screen Writer, Song Writer of films like Chak De! India, Khosla Ka Ghosla, Company, Bunty Aur Babli and Rocket Singh: Salesman of the Year.
- Kultar Singh Sandhwan,18th Speaker Of Punjab Legislative Assembly.
- Ajay Kumar Prashar is a senior ISRO Scientist and Researcher at Space Applications Centre (SAC), known for key contributions to Chandrayaan-1, Chandrayaan-2, Chandrayaan-3, Mars Orbiter Mission and the development and of PDS systems.

== See also ==
- List of things named after Guru Nanak
