= Guru Nanak Nishkam Sevak Jatha =

Sikh organisation

Coordinates: 52°30′5.65″N 1°55′28.39″W

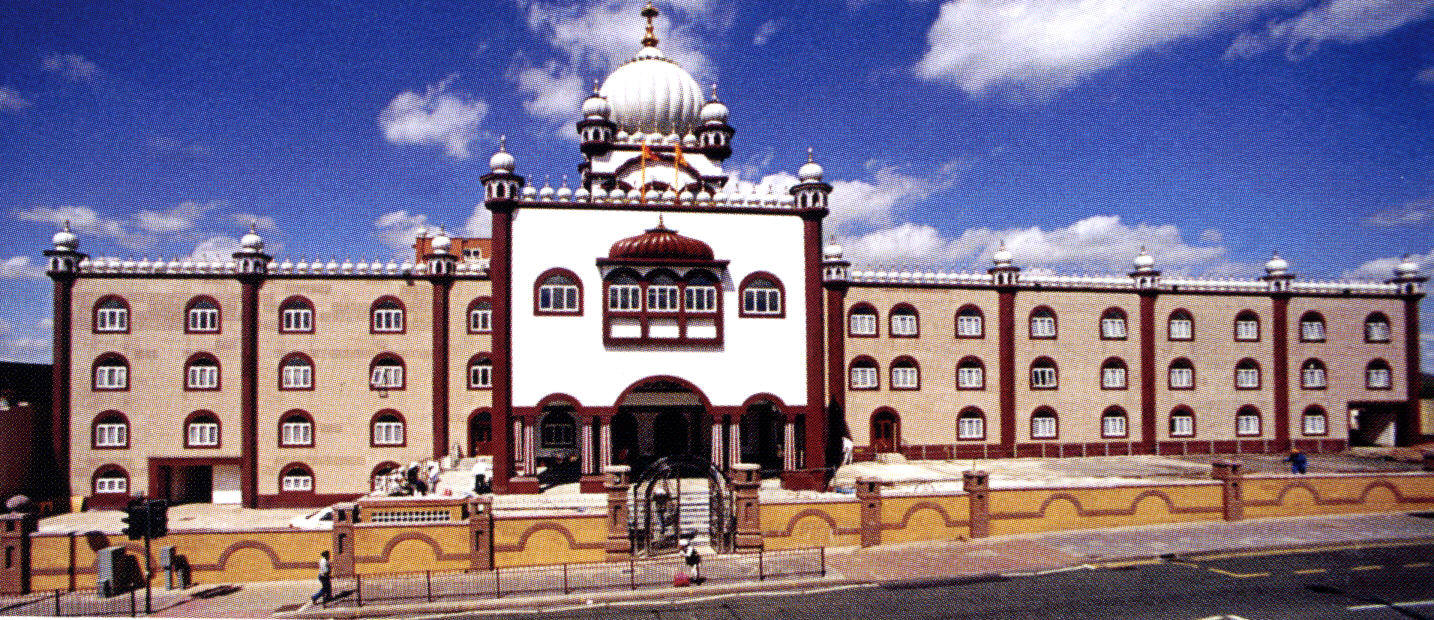
Full Front view from Soho Road

Guru Nanak Nishkam Sevak Jatha operates three Sikh gurdwaras in the United Kingdom, two in India and one in Kenya. The gurdwara in Handsworth, Birmingham, England, also serves as the organisation's headquarters.

== Aims ==
Guru Nanak Nishkam Sevak Jatha is a UK-registered charity whose states aims are

to carry... forward the legacy of the Sikh Gurus through the practice of nishkam sewa (selfless service) and principle of sarbat da bhalla (the wellbeing and flourishing of all).

== Birmingham Gurdwara and international headquarters ==
The Gurdwara Sahib is a Sikh place of worship. It was built in the late 1970s under the spiritual guidance of Sant Baba Puran Singh ji (d. 1983) and the leadership of Norang Singh (d. 1995). The Spiritual leadership of the jatha is now continued through the vision of Mohinder Singh.

The gurdwara spans an area of about 25,000 square meters and the building is four stories high. There are five main Darbar Halls and three Langar Halls. There are approximately 100 rooms, most of which are for the sangat who want to stay at the Gurdwara for the night and have facilities for sleeping and washing.

The main Darbar is used for continuous Akhand Path recital. A new Paath is started on Monday, Wednesday and Friday mornings, unless a Samagam "community meeting" is under way.

At Samagam programs, there is Sampat Paath recitation of a shabda: each line of the gurbani is followed by a sampat. Sampath Paath usually takes eleven days of continuous reading.

== See also ==
- List of places named after Guru Nanak Dev
