= Mahmud Gawan Madrasa =

15th-century place of learning, now a mosque, in Bidar, Karnataka, India

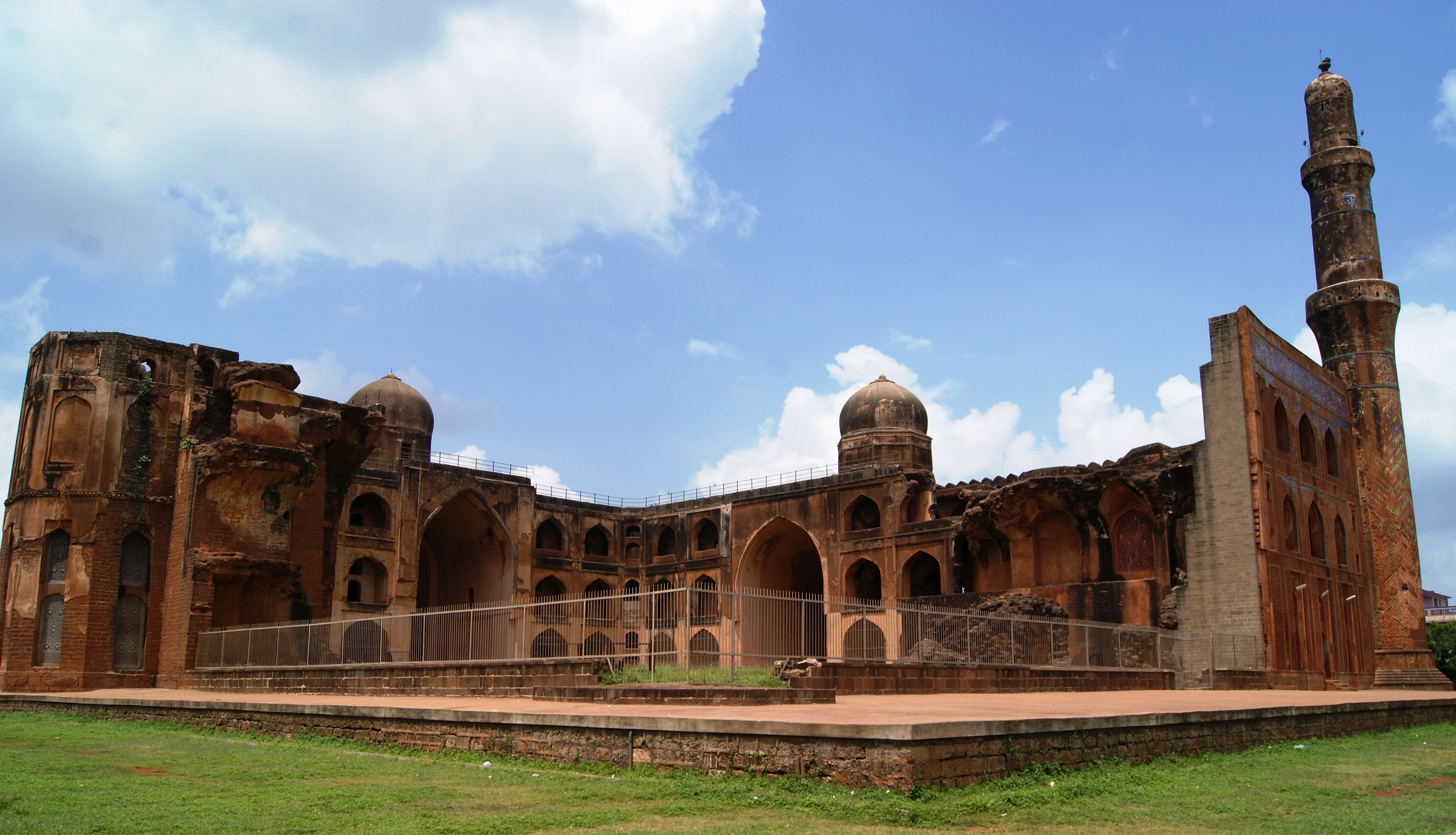
- Complete view of the former madrasa, now mosque, in 2012

- Location of the former madrassa and mosque in Karnataka

Religion
- Affiliation: Sunni Islam
- Ecclesiastical or organisational status: Madrassa (former); Mosque (current or not?); Profane use (1656–1690s)
- Governing body: Government of India
- Status: Active (partial ruinous state)

Location
- Location: Bidar, Karnataka
- Country: India
- Administration: Archaeological Survey of India (since 1914)
- Coordinates: 17°54′53″N 77°31′48″E

Architecture
- Type: Mosque architecture
- Style: Indo-Islamic; Bahmani
- Founder: Mahmud Gawan (Khwaja Mahmud Geelani)
- Funded by: Bahamani Dynasty
- Established: 1460 (as an institution)
- Completed: 876 AH (1471/1472 CE) (as a madrassa)

Specifications
- Length: 62 m (205 ft)
- Width: 55 m (180 ft)
- Height (max): 40 m (131 ft)
- Dome: Two
- Minaret: Two (one partially intact)
- Elevation: 710 m (2,329 ft)

Monument of National Importance
- Official name: Madarsa Mahmud Gawan
- Criteria: Archaeological and Cultural Heritage
- Reference no.: N-KA-D40

The Mahmud Gawan Madrasa is a former madrasa, now mosque, in partial ruins, located in Bidar, in the state of Karnataka, India. It was completed in 876 AH (1471/1472 CE) and is an example of the regional style of Indo-Islamic architecture under the Bahmani Sultanate. Founded by the prime-minister of the sultanate in the late 15th century, it bears testimony to the scholarly genius of Mahmud Gawan, who first came to Delhi, in exile, as a Persian trader from Gilan in Iran and moved to Bidar in 1453.

Mahmud reportedly built the madrasa with his own money and it functioned like a residential university which was built and maintained on the lines of Madrasa of Khurasan. The imposing and spacious building of the institution is considered as an architectural gem and an important landmark of Bidar.

The structure is a Monument of National Importance, administered by the Archaeological Survey of India (ASI) since 1914. In 2014, UNESCO placed the building on its "tentative list" to become a World Heritage Site, under the name Monuments and Forts of the Deccan Sultanate. (Note: The singular use of "Sultanate" by UNESCO implies the existence of just one Sultanate. However, there were a number of different Sultanates.)

== Location ==
Situated on the Deccan Plateau, 710 metres (2,330 ft) AMSL, Bidar is a place of Cultural and Historical Importance for many years. The monument is located between the Chowbara (Clock Tower) and the fort, 200–300 metres (660–980 ft) away. Remains of the monument stand strong amongst the chaos of urban settlement around it. Its principal east façade, now partly ruined, faces the city's main street leading to the Bidar Fort.

== History ==
In the reign of Muhammad Shah Bahamani II (1463–1482), Khwaja Mahmud Geelani (better known as Mahmud Gawan), an old noble who bore the title of Maliku't-Tujar built the madrasa of which the remains still exist. In the time of Firishta, nearly a century and a half later, it was still in perfect preservation and with the great mosque and other buildings by the same founder, in what was called Gawan-ki Chowk (present day Gawan Chowk) were then still applied to the purpose for which they were originally designed.

In 1635, during the wars of Aurangzeb, Bidar was ravaged by Khan Dauran. In the end of 1656, it was invested by Aurangzeb himself. The historians of this time describes ″he entered the city and proceeding to a mosque which had been built 200 years before, in the reign of Bahamani Sultans, he caused the Kutba to be read in the name of his father Emperor Shah Jahan.

After this capture, the madrasa was principally appropriated as barrack for a body of cavalry, while a room (or rooms) near the left minar were used to store gunpowder which exploded in an accident. It blew up fully of one-fourth of the edifice, destroying the tower and entrance.

The structure suffered significant damage following a lightning strike in 1107 AH (1695/1696 CE) and the building fell into disuse. When the ASI took over administration of the property in 1914, it was in a poor and partially ruinous state.

== Architecture ==
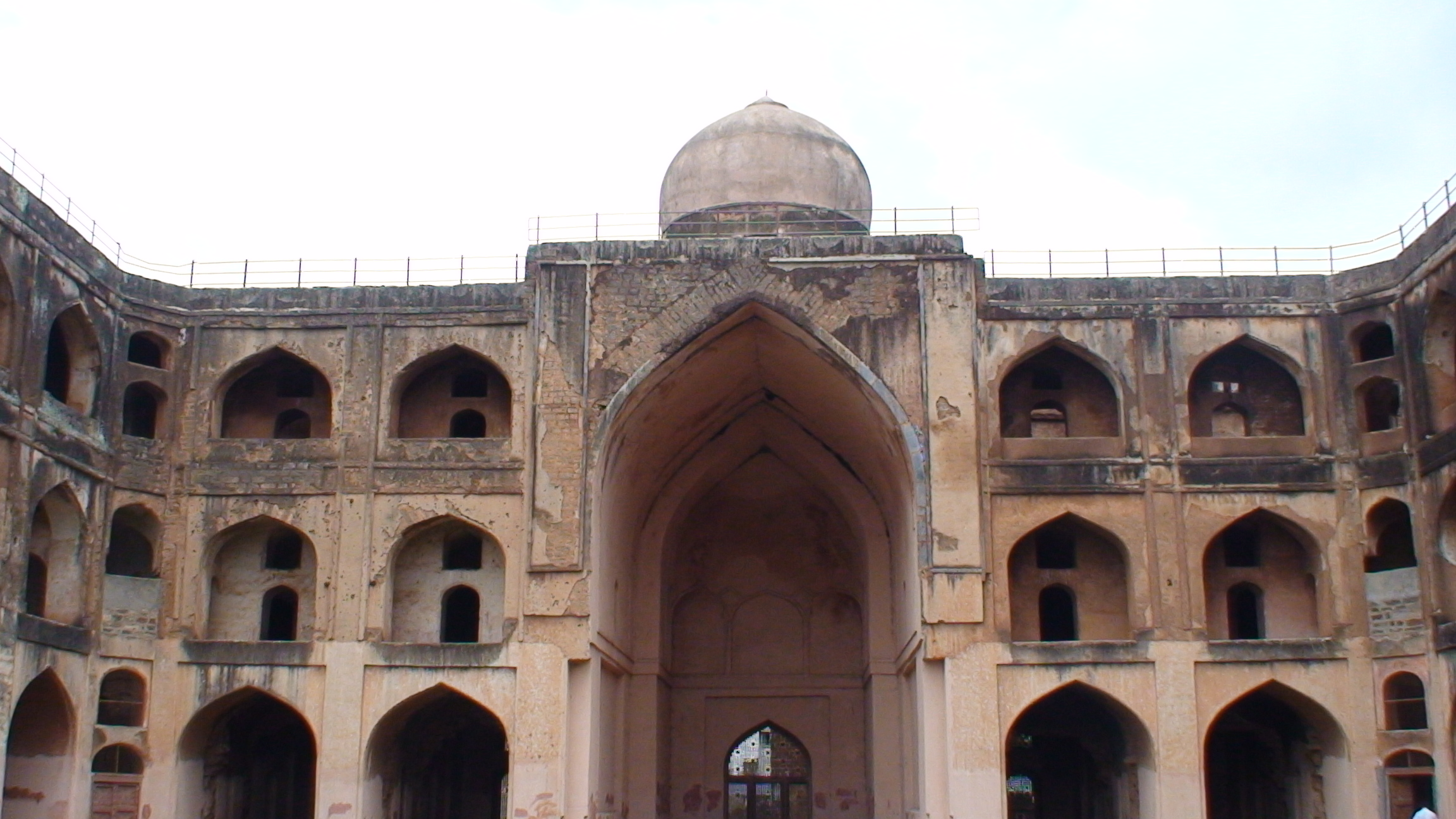
Front of the madrasa

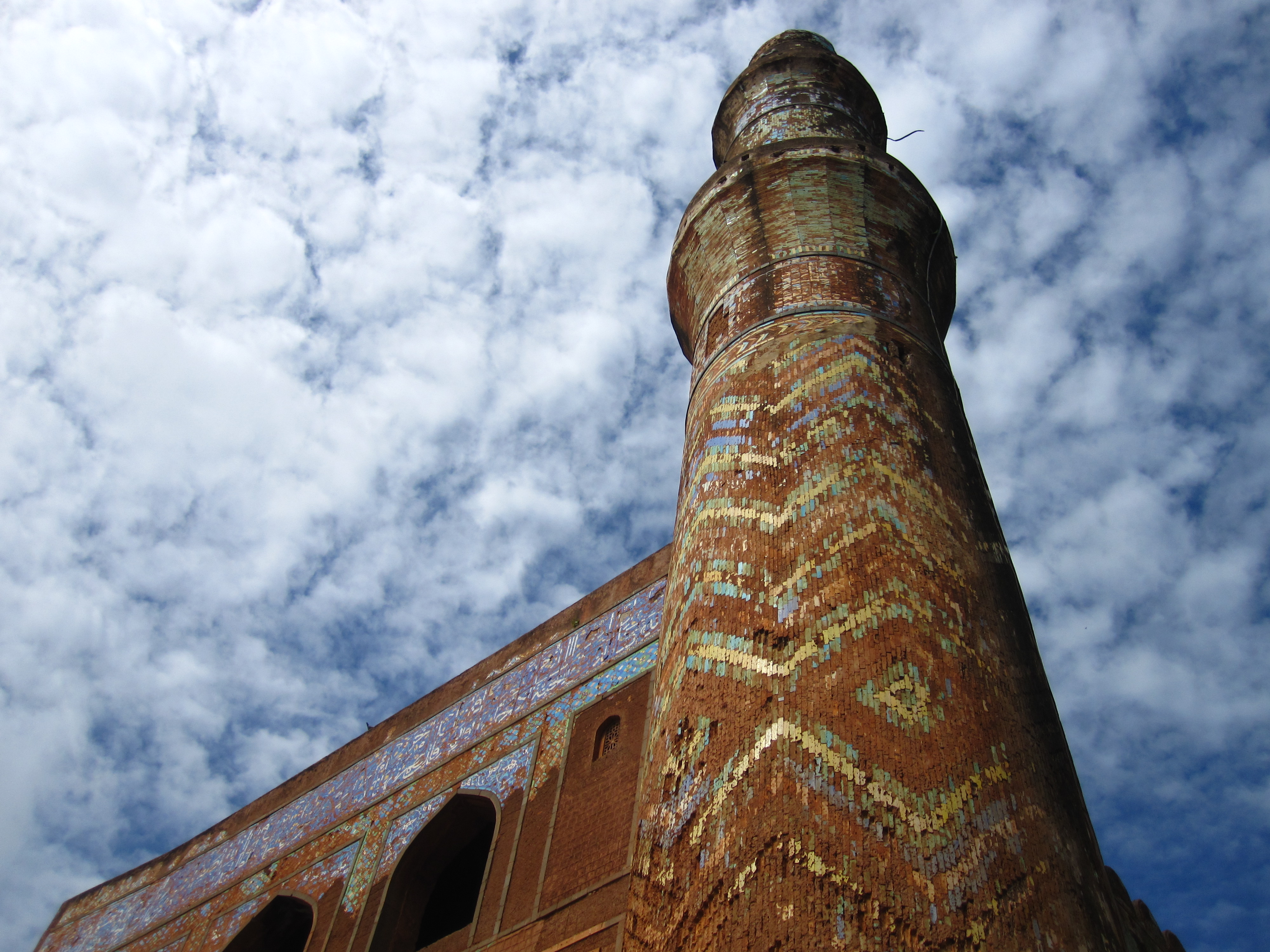
Minaret with decorative tiles

The madrasa, or Islamic seminary, was a striking building, though long in a ruinous condition. It occupied an area of 62 by 55 metres (205 by 180 ft), (Note: With one source claiming that the site was 68 by 60 metres (223 by 197 ft), including the courtyard.) and was entered by a large gateway on the east in front of which it had two minarets, approximately 30 metres (100 ft) high. The rooms surround an open area 9.3 square metres (100 sq ft), in the middle of each of three sides of which was a large apartment or hall 7.9 metres (26 ft) wide by approximately 16 metres (52 ft) long, rising to the full height of building, which is of three stories. Each of these hall has a dome on the outer end over the oriel that projects beyond the line of the walls. The walls of the madrasa measure exactly 74 metres (242 ft) from east to west and 67 metres (220 ft) from north to south.

The building has a high basement. To make the approach convenient, two terraces were built in front of it. The main entrance has vanished, and its floor was exposed during excavations. Beyond the entrance there was a portico, square in plant at the base, measuring 4.67 metres (15 ft 4 in) each way. The minaret at the northern and of the façade and the wall adjoining it towards the south are comparatively the best preserved portions of the madrasa, although only fragments of their tile decoration and trellis work have survived. The minaret has an octagonal base with a round shape at the point. The minaret has three storey, the first and second have balconies which project from the main body of the tower in a curvilinear form, without support brackets.

The foundations and the lower courses, at least, of the building are all jointed with thin sheets of lead. The minar was faced with enamelled tiles of different colours in zig zag lines round the lower half of it.

=== Inscription ===
Portions of the walls, especially in the front, have also been covered with the same materials, and a broad frieze along the top of the front wall was inscribed with sentences from Q'uran in coloured letters on a ground of green and gold. A part of this wall remains intact, seen on the right side of the front.

In Arabic

این مدرسہ رفیع و محمود بنا
تعمیر شدہ است قبله اهل صفا
آثار قبول بین که تاریخش
از آیت ربّنا تقبّل مِنّا

Translation:
In English

This exalted school with a high (lit. praiseworthy) basement,
Has been built as the place of adoration (qibla) for the pure.
Look at the signs of its Divine acceptance that its chronogram
(Is contained) in the Qur'anic verse, "‘Our Lord, accept it from us”.

== Significance ==
The entire campus is a grand presentation of Islamic architecture, with intelligent planning and construction for building the madrasa. The surface treatment is composed of colour produced by glazed tiles of different hues. Traces of exquisite colourful tiles are visible on the building walls. The floral decor, arabesque design, and decorative inscriptions with arches dominate every facade, making it a striking example of Indo-Islamic architecture. (Note: By the beginning of the 14th century, the plan was stereotypical, and used for Ben Youssef Madrasa (in Marrakesh), and madrasas in Fez, and elsewhere in north-west Africa. However, the stately round minarets of Mahmud Gawan Madrasa are unique.) Mahmud Gawan was familiar with similarly renowned colleges in Samarkhand and in the wider Khorasan, a historical region spanning parts of present-day Iran, Afghanistan, and Central Asia. The madrasa contains lecture halls, a laboratory, a mosque, students’ hostel, dining room, and quarters for teaching faculty. In addition to Islamic studies, science and mathematics were taught by a carefully chosen faculty which comprised Islamic scholars, scientists, philosophers, and Arabic scholars. Free boarding, lodging, and education was provided to over 500 students at any given time, including students from outside India. Prior to his death, the founder established a library of 3,000 volumes in the madrasa; however, what became of it is not known.

=== Preservation ===
The Archaeological Survey of India (ASI) took up the programme to preserve and protect ancient monuments in Bidar district in 2005. It included marking boundaries around these structures, building aesthetically designed compound walls, providing lighting and laying gardens around some monuments.

Bidar was placed on the World Monument Watch List, 2014, which gives some hope for improvements in this City of Whispering Monuments.

Today goats graze among the majestic ruins and the windows with exquisite jali look out like haunted eyes. There are approximately 100 historic monuments in and around Bidar, including the Mahmud Gawan Madarasa. Plans to develop a park around the madrasa has not been realised. The open space behind the monument is used as cricket ground by locals, with the balls often hitting the monument.

In 2024, the ASI signed an agreement with the Bidar-based Shaheen Group of Institutions to assist with preserving the site.

== Gallery ==
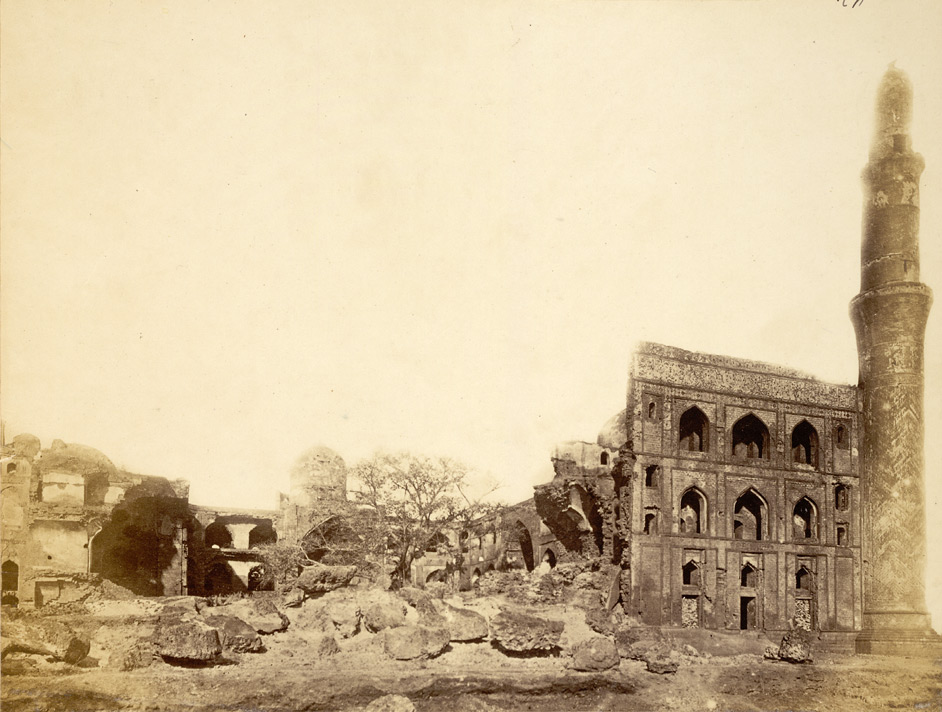

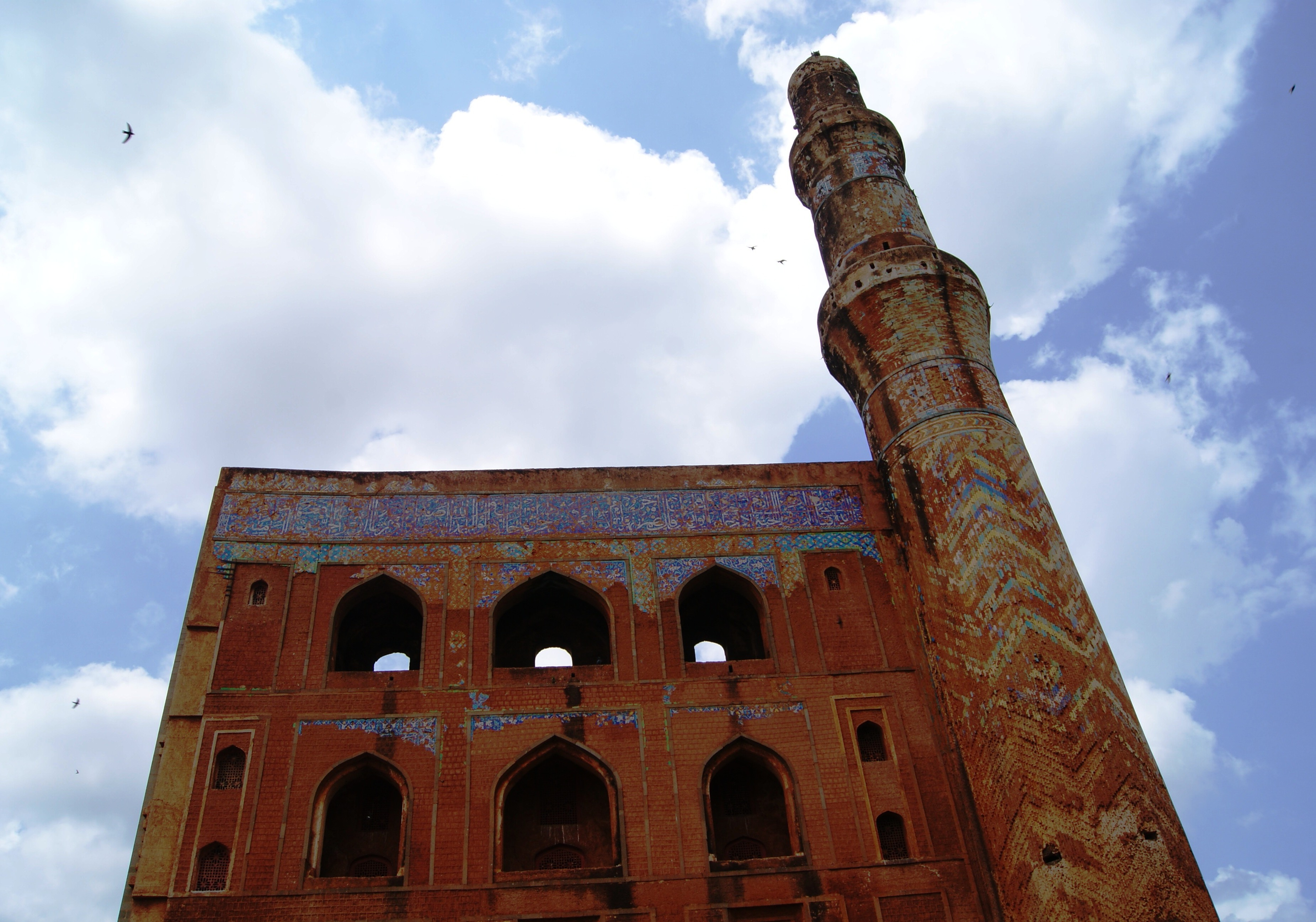

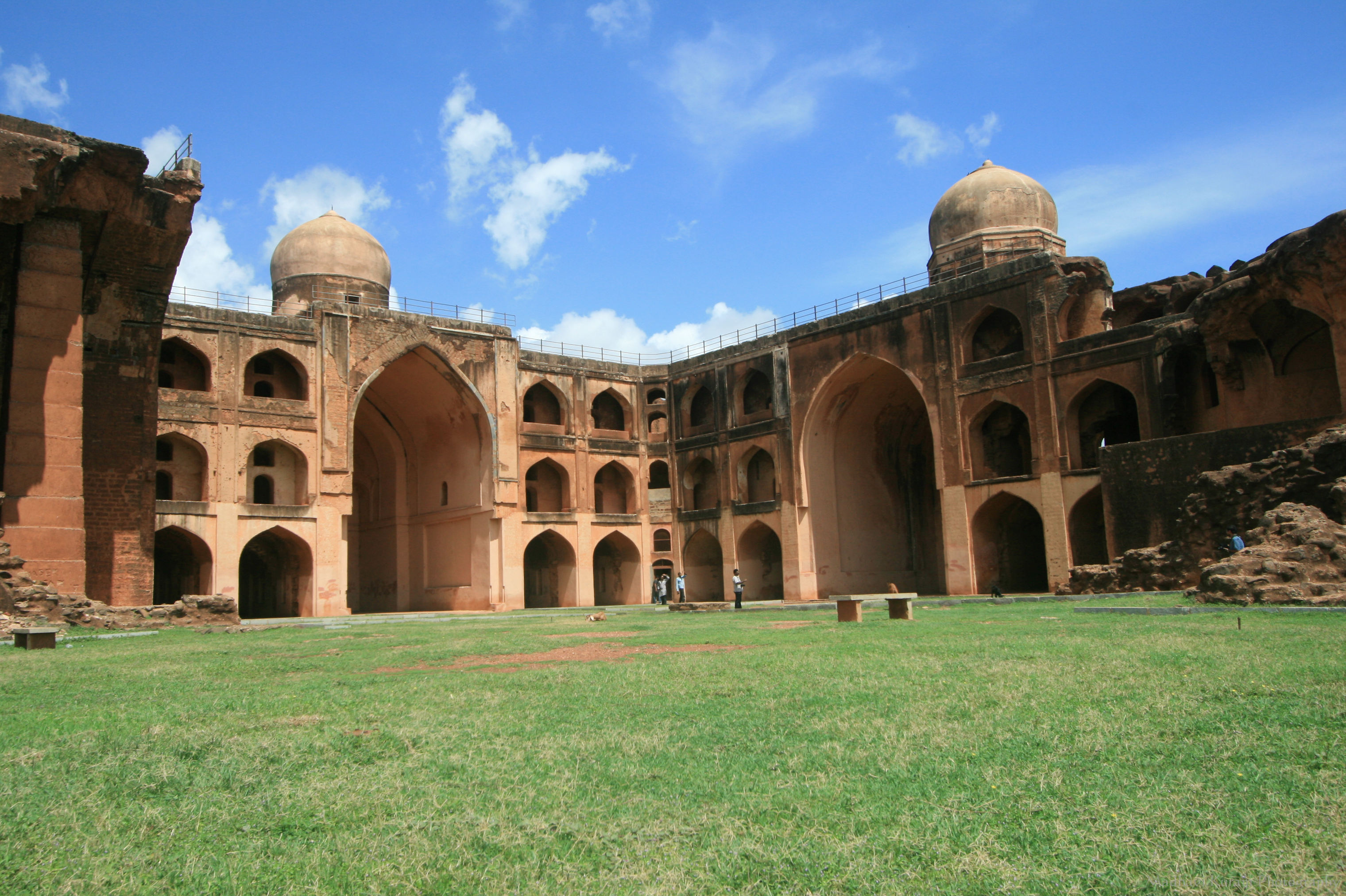

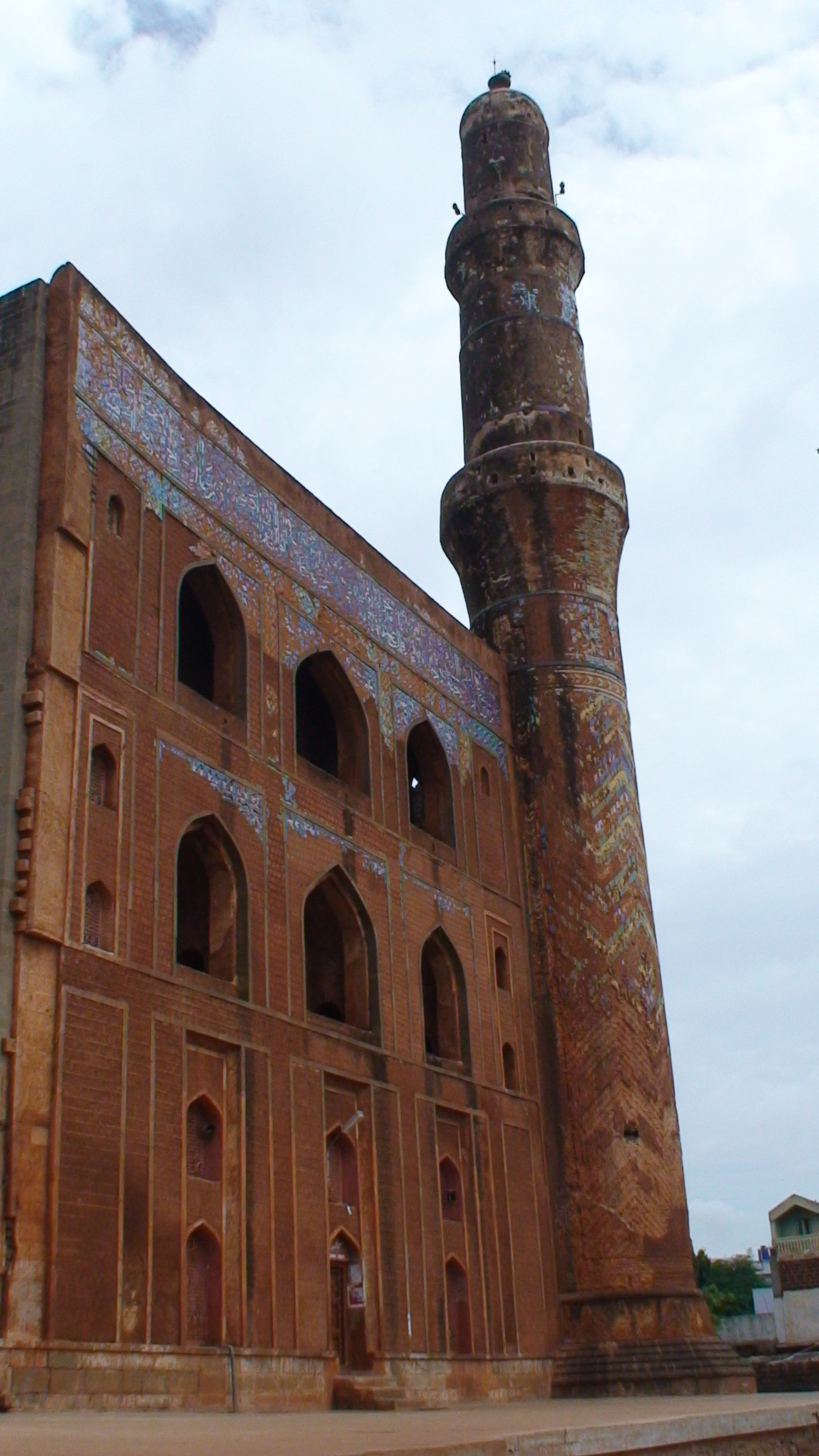

== See also ==
- Islam in India
- List of mosques in India
- List of Monuments of National Importance in Bidar district
