= Guru Nanak Home for Handicapped Children =

Ranchi, India

- Abbreviation: GNH
- Formation: February 1970
- Founder: Ishar Singh Chopra
- Type: Charitable trust
- Location: Bariatu Road, Ranchi - 834 009, Jharkhand
- Website: http://www.gurunanakhome.org

Guru Nanak Home for Handicapped Children (GNH) is a charitable institution in Ranchi, Jharkhand, India, providing free medical treatment, corrective surgeries, physiotherapy, and rehabilitation for physically disabled children. It was founded by Ishar Singh Chopra.

== Description ==
This Institution was established in February 1970 to commemorate 500th Birth Anniversary (1469-1969) of Saheb Shri Guru Nanak Dev Jee. It is managed by a board of trustees. This Institution is dedicated to the service of humanity without distinction of caste, creed, religion or sex. The main aim of the Institution is to provide free treatment to the physically handicapped children.

The 'Home' has existing 80 indoor beds which can be increased to a hundred beds. It has an operation theatre, three physiotherapy halls, Pathology Lab., an 'X'-Ray Unit and an O.P.D.

The Home has RJSP Artificial Limb Centre in the campus. Physically handicapped children are provided free board and lodging along with free treatment. Dining Hall, Kitchen and a Recreation Room have been provided for these children. Attendants of the patients are also provided free board and lodging. Cerebral palsy, congenital (from birth) deformities, myopathy, paraplegia, hemiplegia, polio deformities, complicated problems following injuries and other deformities are managed here. Physiotherapy and occupational therapy for outdoor patients are also available. Xavier Institute of Social Service helps in educating the children admitted in the Home. This Institution has been selected for training of International surgeons. The Home spends over Rs. 2,00,000.00 (Rupees Two lac only) approximately per month for all the above-mentioned facilities. This money comes as donation mainly from the public of Ranchi in cash or in kind. Army units and Army Wives Welfare Association (AWWA) are actively involved in helping the 'Home'. Guru Nanak Trust Fund, London is a major donor to this Institution. Rotary Club of Ranchi and Ranchi North have been helping the 'Home'. Various Lions Clubs of Ranchi also extend help to the 'Home'.

== Establishment ==
The home was established in February 1970 to commemorate the 500th birth anniversary of Guru Nanak Dev Ji, the central figure in Sikhism. It was founded by Ishar Singh Chopra, Sureshwar Pandey, Harnam Singh Gandhok and Ujjal Singh.

Amarjit Chopra, son of Ishar Singh Chopra, put forward the idea of his father and the renowned orthopaedic surgeon Dr Sureshwar Pandey at a meeting of Newham International Community in Forest Gate, London where Mr Avtar Singh Kalha, their present trustee was also a member. The community agreed to run a project to bring together people of different ethnic groups in Newham for a common purpose. They chose to mark the 500th centenary of the birth of Guru Nanak with a charitable work. All the UK communities, including Christians, Hindus, and Sikhs collected £1,000 and this initiated the Home in Ranchi with just 10 beds in a rented bungalow. The committee of Newham Community was then disbanded, but some of the members continued to keep in touch to support the Home from the UK.

== Present operation ==
The home in Ranchi is run by a properly constituted trust from local donations and help from the UK. Since its inception, the Guru Nanak Home has worked to rehabilitate poor, unfortunate and disabled children without any consideration of cast, creed or religion. Although named after Guru Nanak Dev Ji and helped largely by Sikhs, Guru Nanak Home is a humanitarian charity where most of the children are non Sikhs.

Co-founder Dr. Sureshwar Pandey remains the Honorary Medical Advisor. He and his son Anil (Assistant Medical Director) have contributed their services free to the Home since its inception.

To date, some 36,000 handicapped children have been treated at the Home, 550 artificial limbs have been fitted, and 10,900 orthotic appliances supplied. Complicated operations are performed to correct severe polio, trauma and birth deformities. A programme of rehabilitation follows, which includes education as well, so that the children's school studies are not interrupted while on prolonged treatment periods at the Home.

== See also ==
- List of places named after Guru Nanak Dev
