= Grey Nuns Hospital =

Grey Nuns Hospital may refer to one of several hospitals established by the Grey Nuns in Canada, including:

- Grey Nuns Community Hospital, an acute care hospital in Edmonton, Alberta.
- Grey Nuns' Hospital, a hospital that operated from 1695 to 1880 in Montreal, Quebec.
- Pasqua Hospital (formerly Grey Nuns Hospital), a hospital in Regina, Saskatchewan.
