= I Too Had a Love Story =

2008 autobiography by Ravinder Singh

- Cover page
- Author: Ravinder Singh
- Language: English
- Genre: Memoir, Novel
- Published: 2008
- Publisher: Srishti publishers, Penguin India
- Publication place: India
- ISBN: 978-0143418764
- Website: www.ravindersinghonline.com/first-book-excerpt.html

I Too Had a Love Story is an English autobiographical novel written by Ravinder Singh. This was the debut novel of the author and was first published in 2008 by Srishti Publishers, in 2012 it was republished by Penguin India. The book remained in the best-seller’s list in India even after 6 years of its first publication.

== Plot ==
Ravin and Khushi are the male and female protagonists of the novel. The novel starts with a reunion in Kolkata of Ravin and his three male friends Manpreet, Amardeep, Happy, who used to study in the same engineering college. During the reunion they discuss their future plans of getting married and all of them accept that they did not think about it. Happy suggests Ravin to visit and sign up at Shaadi.com, an online matrimonial website.

She died. I survived.
Because I survived, I died everyday [sic?].
I was bound by my stars to live a lonely life. Without her, I felt so alone. Though the fact is that it’s just she who is gone and everything else is the same. But this ‘everything else’ is nothing to me ...

— Excerpt from the novel

After the reunion, Ravin comes back to Bhubaneswar, Orissa, where he works as an engineer for Infosys, and registers at Shaadi.com. After a few days of registering on the site, Ravin finds a girl named Khushi, a resident of Delhi, and an employee of CSC, Noida. Ravin and Khushi start talking to each other over phone and soon become good friends. They become curious about each other's interest and find there are many similarities between them. After a few months of conversation over phone, they realise that they have started falling in love with each other, although they have never met face-to-face. Very soon, Ravin is asked to travel to the United States for an office assignment. He is required to go to Delhi, where Khushi lives, to board the international flight. Ravin decides to go to Delhi one day earlier to meet Khushi for the first time, and spend time with her.

In Delhi, Ravin meets Khushi and her family including her mother and sisters and then starts his journey to the US. Even during his stay in the US, Ravin is constantly in touch with Khushi. After his return to India, Ravin meets Khushi once again. After sometime, Khushi's family visits Bhubaneswar and meet Ravin's parents. There, they decide the date of Ravin and Khushi's engagement. Both the families start preparing for the event. The engagement date was fixed on 14 Feb 2007. The reason behind this is Khushi wants to be Ravin's girlfriend and fiancée both on the Valentine's Day.

Just before the engagement, Khushi meets with a road accident and is hospitalized in a critical condition. Despite all medical attempts and prayers of Ravin, Khushi dies after a few days. The novel ends with Ravin's narration of his current mental condition. To Ravin, his life has become meaningless after Khushi's death and he has lost interest in almost everything. He feels "She died. I survived. Because I survived, I die everyday [sic?]."

== Reception ==
The novel received positive reviews from critics. The Hindu in their review called the novel a "tear-jerker". MeriNews appreciated the writing style and innate beauty and wrote—

Along with the innate beauty of their love story, the expression of the subtle emotions in the most simple and lucid way makes it special. . . The writer has summed up the essence of his story in the most appealing terms.

The Viewspaper reviewer Savrina Kapoor wrote—

The author has described the instances of his personal life in the story. Being a love story, the genre seems very interesting and appealing to many youngsters who have experienced the essence of love and relationships in their lives and those who have sacrificed something for other’s happiness.
