= Bidar =

City in Karnataka, India

- City
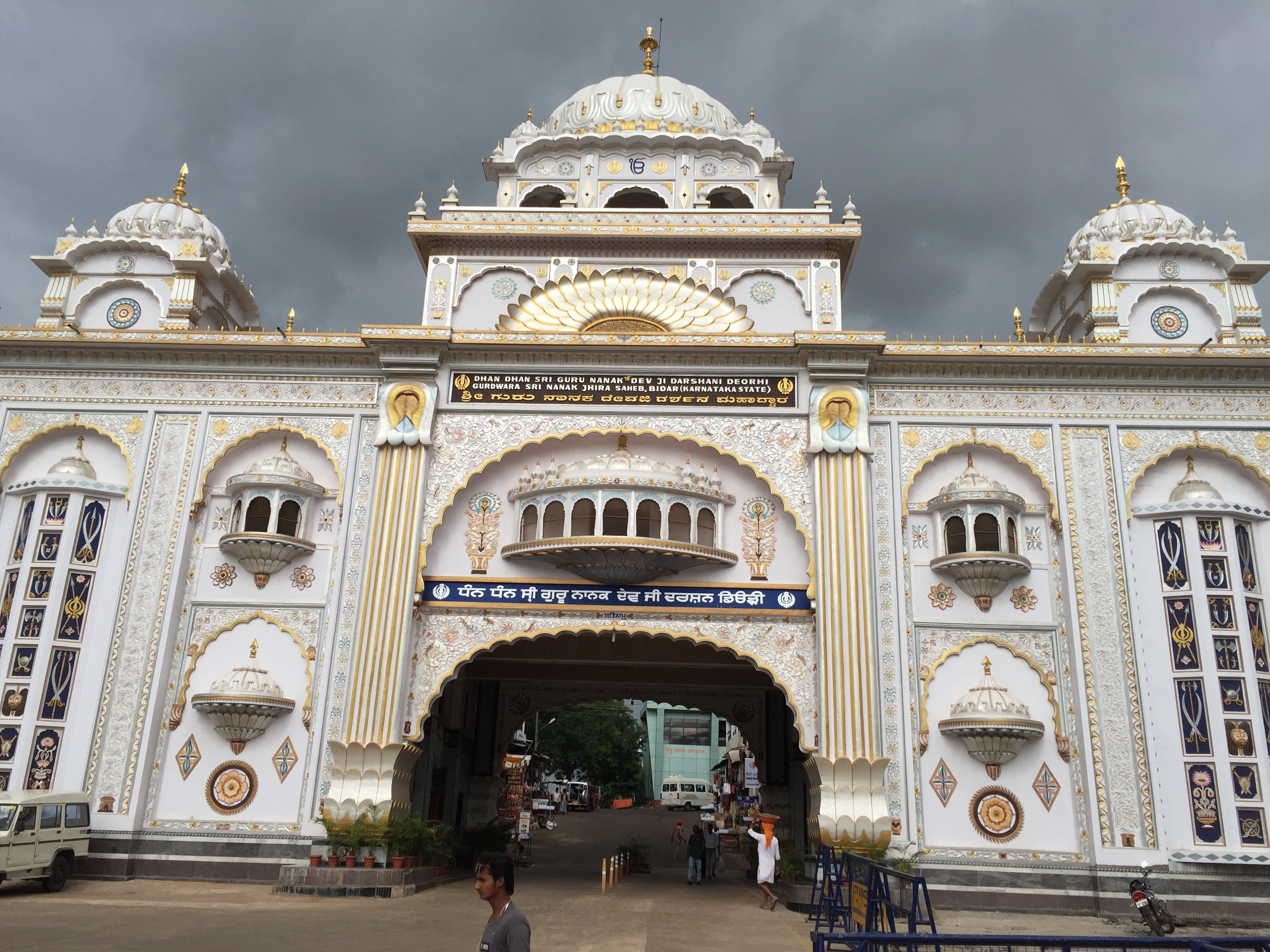
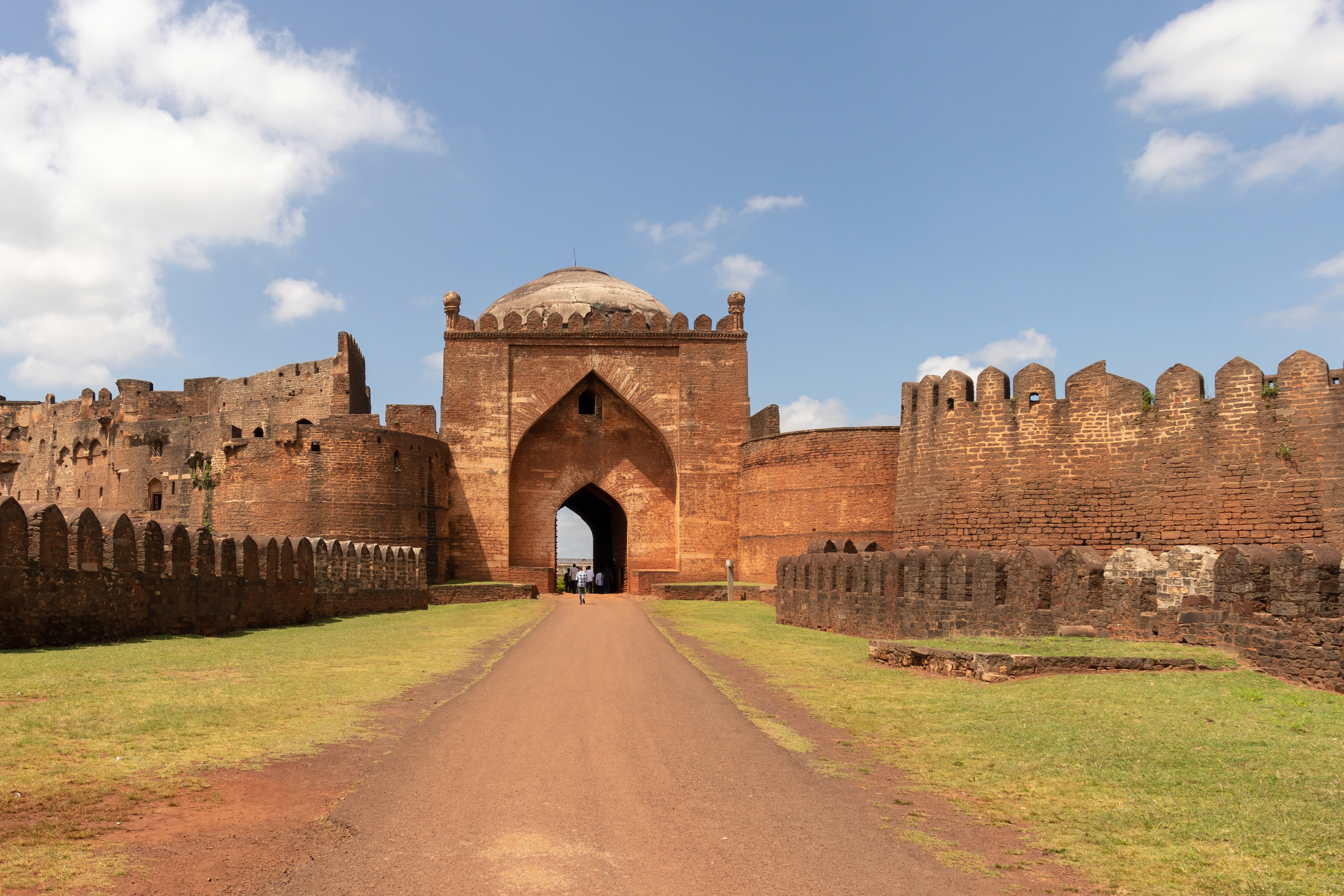
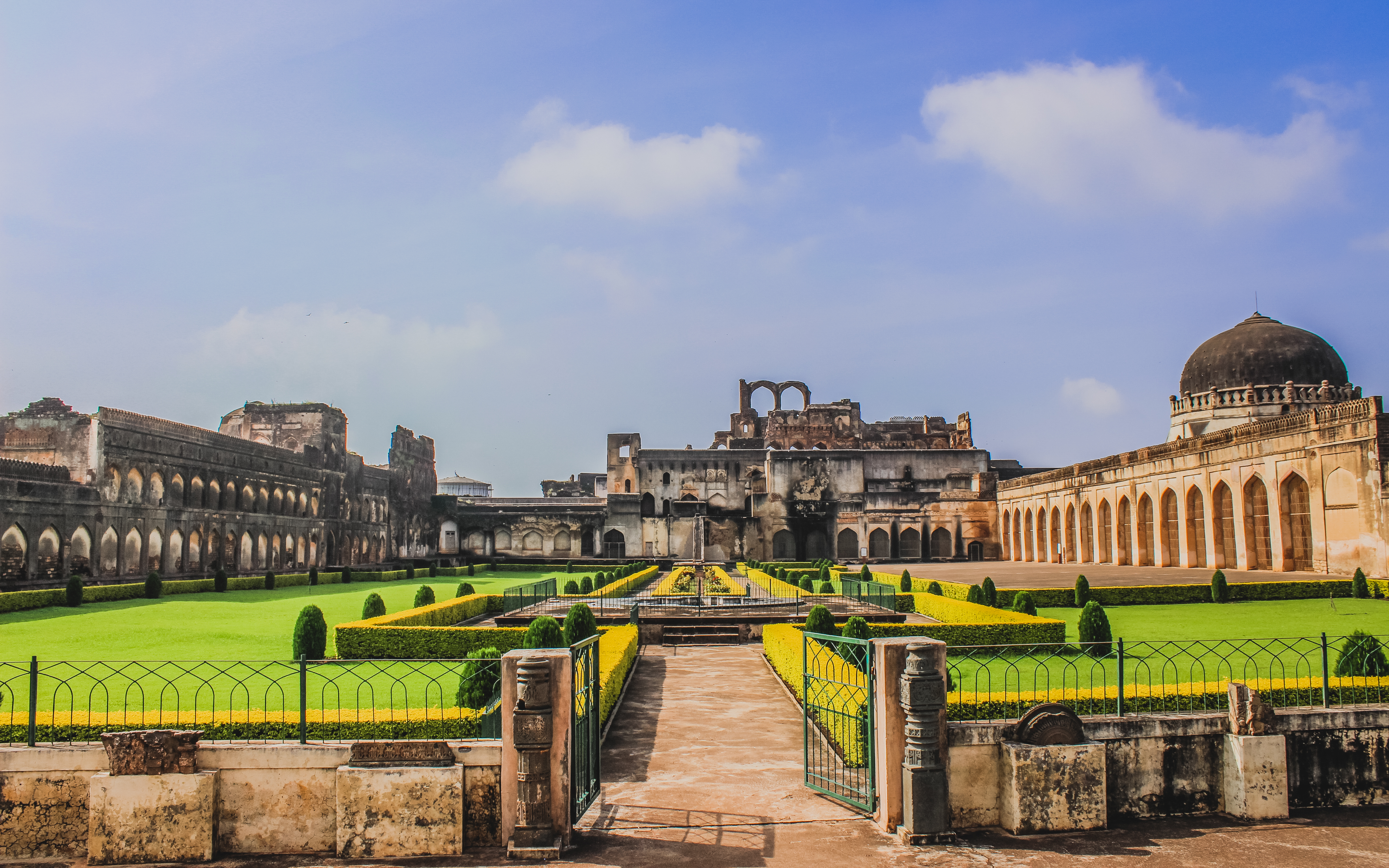
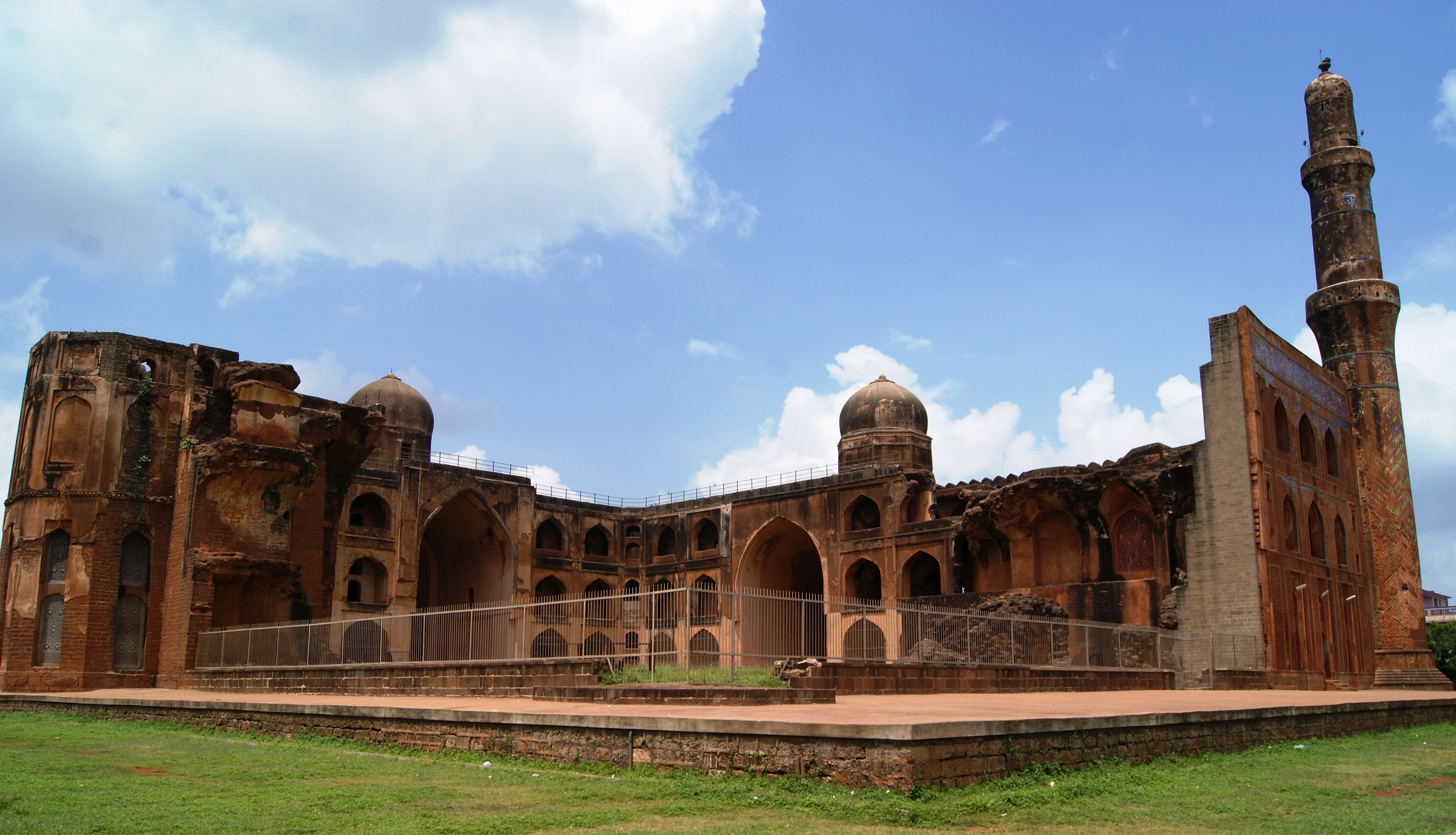
- (clockwise from top) Bidar Fort; One of the Barid Shahi tombs; Guru Nanak Jhira Sahib; Ruins of the Mahmud Gawan Madrasa
- Nicknames: The City of Whispering Monuments and Crown Town
- Interactive map of Bidar
- Coordinates: 17.912°N 77.520°E
- Country: India
- State: Karnataka
- District: Bidar district
- Founder: Bommagondeshwara
- Named for: Bidri

Government
  - Type: City Municipal Corporation; Urban Development Authority
  - Body: Bidar City Municipal Corporation; Bidar Urban Development Authority

Area
  - Total: 55.6 km^{2} (21.5 sq mi)
- Elevation: 710 m (2,330 ft)

Population (2011)
  - Total: 216,020
  - Rank: 11th (Karnataka); 216th (India)
  - Density: 3,890/km^{2} (10,100/sq mi)
  - Sex ratio: 938♀/1,000 ♂
- Demonyms: Bidri; Bidarinavaru
- Time zone: UTC+05:30 (IST)
- Pincode(s): 585401/02/03
- Area code: +91-(0)8482
- Vehicle registration: KA-38
- Official language: Kannada
- Literacy: 92.88%
- Planning agency: Bidar Urban Development Authority
- Website: bidarcity.mrc.gov.in

Bidar ( Kannada: [biːd̪əɾ] ) is a city and the headquarters of the Bidar district in Karnataka state of India. Bidar is a prominent place on the archaeological map of India. It is well known for architectural, historical religious and rich heritage sites. Picturesquely perched on the Deccan Plateau, the Bidar fort (Bidar Kote) is more than 500 years old and still standing strong. According to the book "Bidar Heritage" published by the state Department of Archaeology, Museums and Heritage, of the 61 monuments listed by the department, about 30 are tombs located in and around Bidar city., hence its nickname, "City of Whispering Monuments". The heritage sites in and around Bidar have become the major attraction for film shooting in recent years, with Bollywood making visits apart from Kannada film industry.

Bidar is home for the second biggest Indian Air Force training centre in the country. The IAF Station Bidar is used for advanced jet training of prospective fighter pilots on BAe Hawk aircraft.

Bidar city is known for its Bidri handicraft products, and its rich history. Bidar is also considered one of the holiest place for Sikh pilgrimage. Unlike other places in the region, Bidar is the coldest and wettest place in north Karnataka. For the year 2009–10, Bidar was ranked 22nd among the cleanest cities in India, and 5th cleanest in Karnataka. SH4 passes through Bidar and the whole city is integrated with a 4-lane road.

== Etymology ==
The name Bidar appears to be derived from Kannada word ‘bidiru’, which means bamboo. It was also referred as Bhadrakote.

Legend has associated Bidar with the ancient kingdom of Vidarbha, to which references are found in early Hindu literature like Malavikagnimitra, Mahabharata, the Harivamsa, Bhagavata, and a few other Puranas. Its association can be seen apparently on account of the similarity in names Bidar and Vidarbha. This has been mentioned in Firishta's writings.

The traditional tales reveal that Vidura lived here; hence the place was earlier called Viduranagara and also as the place where Nala and Damayanti (Daughter of Raja Bhima, the King of Vidharba) were meeting.

Bidar under the rule of the Bahmani Sultanate was known as Muhammadabad.

== History ==
The recorded History of the city goes back to the third century B.C. when it was a part of the Mauryan Empire. After the Mauryas, Satavahanas, Kadamba and Chalukyas of Badami and later the Rashtrakutas reigned over Bidar territory. The Chalukyas of Kalyana and Kalachuris of Kalyanis also regained the area. For a short period after Kalyani Chalukyas the area of Bidar was under the rule of Seunas of Devagiri and Kakatiyas of Warangal.

=== Bahmani Sultanate ===
The Delhi Sultanate invaded the area first by Allauddin Khilji, and later, Muhammed-bin-Tughluq took control of entire Deccan including Bidar. In the middle of the 14th century, the Sultan of Delhi's officers that were stationed in Deccan rebelled and this resulted in the establishment of Bahmanid Dynasty in 1347 A.D. at Gulbarga/Hasanabad (present Kalaburagi). There was frequent warfare between the Bahmanids and the Vijaynagar Kingdom.

The history of the present fort at Bidar is attributed to the sultan Ahmed Shah Wali Bahmani, the sultan of the Bahmani dynasty till 1427, when he shifted his capital from Gulbarga to Bidar since it had better climatic conditions and was also a fertile and fruit-bearing land. The earliest recorded history of its existence as a small and strong fort is also traced to prince Ulugh Khan in 1322, whereafter it came under the reign of the Tughlaq dynasty.

With the establishment of the Bahmanid dynasty (1347), Bidar was occupied by Sultan Ala-ud-Din Bahman Shah Bahmani. During the rule of Ahmad Shah I (1422–1486), Bidar was made the capital city of Bahmani Kingdom. The old fort was rebuilt and madrasas, mosques, palaces, and gardens were raised. Mahmud Gawan, who became the prime minister in 1466, was a notable figure in the history of Bidar. Bidar remained under the Barid Shahi dynasty until conquest by the Bijapur Sultanate in 1619. Aurangzeb came to Bidar after his father, Padshah (emperor) Shah Jahan, appointed him the Prince of Deccan. In 1635, during this campaign led by of Aurangzeb, Bidar was ravaged by Khan Dauran. In the end of 1656, and Mahmud Gawan Madrasa was entered by Aurangzeb himself. The historians of this time describes ″he entered the city and proceeding to a mosque which had been built 200 years before, in the reign of Bahamani Sultans, he ordered the khutba to be read in the name of his father, Shah Jahan. The madrasa was principally appropriated as barrack for a body of cavalry, while a room (or rooms) near the left minar were used to store gunpowder which exploded in an accident. It blew up fully of one-fourth of the edifice, destroying the tower and entrance. Finally, in 1656 Aurangzeb then wrested the Bidar Fort from the Adil Shahis after a 21-day war. With this, Bidar became a part of the Mughal dynasty for the second time. Bidar then was made a subah (imperial top-level province) in the same year, which Telangana Subah was merged into the next year.

In 1724, Bidar became a part of the Asaf Jahi Kingdom of the Nizams. Third son of Asaf jah l ( Nizam l ) Mir Sa'id Muhammad Khan, Salabat Jang ruled from Bidar fort from 1751 to 1762, till his brother Mir Nizam Ali Khan Asaf Jah III imprisoned him in this fort, and was killed in Bidar fort on 16 September 1763. Mohammedabad old name of Bidar is also on his name. It was connected to Hyderabad by rail in the early 20th century. After India's independence, in 1956 all Kannada speaking areas were merged to form the Mysore State and Bidar became part of the new Mysore (now Karnataka) state.

==== Karez System ====
Ancient Karez System in the city have been recently discovered. The Karez (Qanat) is an underground network of aqueducts for water supply. The Bidar Karez, built in the 15th century, is more than 3 km (1.9 mi) long with 21 air vents. Underground canals, built to connect underground water streams, were meant to provide drinking water to civilian settlements and the garrison inside the Bidar fort. This was necessary in a city where the soil was rocky and drilling wells was difficult. The Bidar karez systems, believed to be the earliest ones in India, were constructed during the Bahmani period. According to Gulam Yazdani's documentation, Bidar has three karez systems: Naubad, Shukla Theerth, and Jamna Mori. Among these, Shukla Theerth stands out as the longest karez system in Bidar. The origin well of this karez was found near Gornalli Kere, a historic embankment. Jamna Mori, on the other hand, primarily served as a distribution system within the old city, with numerous channels intersecting the city streets.

Restoration efforts began in 2014, focusing on the desilting and excavation of the Naubad Karez. In 2015, this initiative led to the discovery of 27 vertical shafts connected to the Karez. The rejuvenation of these systems has had a significant positive impact on Bidar, a city facing water scarcity. Additionally, in 2016, during a sewage line excavation, a seventh line of the system was uncovered.

== Geography ==
Bidar is located at 17.9°N 77.5°E, lies at a central position in Deccan, a plateau at an elevation of 2300 ft from the sea level. It has common boundaries with Maharashtra and Telangana which is, with the districts of Nizamabad and Medak in Telangana on the East and the districts of Latur, Nanded and Osmanabad in Maharashtra on the west. On the south lies the district Gulbarga of Karnataka.

=== Geology ===
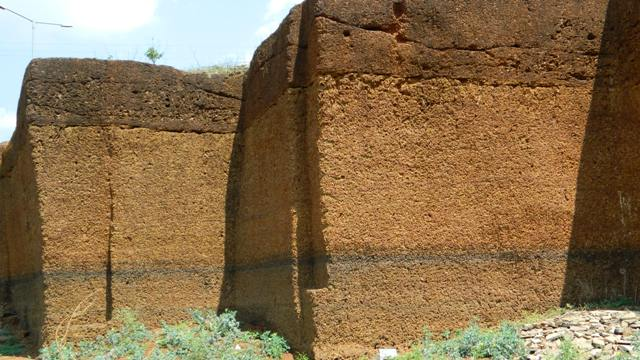
Laterite under the Top soil Layer

The upper crust of the plateau is of laterite, a soft porous rock with limonitic surface. This crust varies in depth from 100 ft (30 m) to 500 ft (150 m) and rests on a bed of trap, which is of much harder texture and less pervious to water. The volume of water filtered during the monsoons through the laterite stratum is arrested by the trappean bed, and a nursery of springs is formed whose natural level of effluence is the line of contact of the two strata along the base of the cliffs of the plateau. The water in course of time frets out for itself an orifice and macerates and loosens portions of its rocky channel till a rift is produced. The rift gradually dilates into a ravine, and the ravine expands into a vale.

The Karez System is built along a geological fracture. Such fractures are formed at the intersection of laterite and basalt rocks and form lineaments or springs that yield water.

=== Soil ===
Bidar soils are deep (>100 cm), well-drained gravelly red clayey soils developed on plateaus of laterites. They are slightly acid to neutral (pH 6.6) in reaction with low cation exchange capacity. They are highly gravelly soils with gravel content (60 to 10%) that decrease with depth.

=== Climate ===
The winter season is from November to middle of February. Bidar is one of the coldest cities (by southern standards) in Karnataka as the minimum temperature during winter nights regularly hovers around 11-12 during December, which is the coldest month with mean daily maximum temperature of 27.3 C and mean daily minimum of 13.4 C. From the middle of the February, both day and night temperatures begin to rise rapidly. May is the hottest month with mean daily maximum temperature of 38.8 C and mean daily minimum of 25.9 C. With the withdrawal of southwest monsoon in the first week of October, there is slight increase in day temperature but night temperature decreases steadily. After October, both day and night temperatures decreases progressively. The hottest temperature recorded at Bidar was 44 °C (111 °F) on 8 May 1931 and the lowest temperature was 2.9 °C (37.2 °F) on 5 January 1901, the lowest temperature ever recorded in Karnataka.

During the 2025-2026 cold wave, Bidar recorded its record low for November and December, and 5.3 °C (41.5 °F) in January.

Present day Bidar covers an expanse of 5448 square kilometres of land and lies between 17°35' and 18°25' North latitudes and 76°42' and 77°39' east longitudes.

Climate data for Bidar (1991–2020, extremes 1901–2020)
Month	Jan	Feb	Mar	Apr	May	Jun	Jul	Aug	Sep	Oct	Nov	Dec	Year
Record high °C (°F)	36.2 (97.2)	39.4 (102.9)	41.7 (107.1)	43.8 (110.8)	44.0 (111.2)	44.0 (111.2)	38.8 (101.8)	36.1 (97.0)	36.7 (98.1)	36.7 (98.1)	36.1 (97.0)	36.8 (98.2)	44.0 (111.2)
Mean daily maximum °C (°F)	29.6 (85.3)	32.6 (90.7)	36.1 (97.0)	38.4 (101.1)	39.3 (102.7)	34.3 (93.7)	30.2 (86.4)	29.2 (84.6)	30.1 (86.2)	30.6 (87.1)	29.6 (85.3)	28.3 (82.9)	32.5 (90.5)
Mean daily minimum °C (°F)	15.6 (60.1)	17.7 (63.9)	21.3 (70.3)	23.9 (75.0)	25.1 (77.2)	23.0 (73.4)	21.6 (70.9)	21.2 (70.2)	21.1 (70.0)	20.2 (68.4)	17.7 (63.9)	15.3 (59.5)	20.3 (68.5)
Record low °C (°F)	2.9 (37.2)	9.4 (48.9)	10.2 (50.4)	12.6 (54.7)	14.2 (57.6)	17.2 (63.0)	15.0 (59.0)	18.0 (64.4)	16.7 (62.1)	12.6 (54.7)	10.2 (50.4)	5.5 (41.9)	2.9 (37.2)
Average rainfall mm (inches)	7.5 (0.30)	1.0 (0.04)	15.8 (0.62)	26.2 (1.03)	24.5 (0.96)	118.8 (4.68)	155.3 (6.11)	185.7 (7.31)	155.8 (6.13)	119.7 (4.71)	23.6 (0.93)	3.0 (0.12)	836.9 (32.95)
Average rainy days	0.4	0.1	1.1	2.1	2.4	7.4	10.0	11.0	8.3	5.6	1.5	0.2	50.2
Average relative humidity (%) (at 17:30 IST)	45	38	36	37	37	57	68	72	67	61	56	50	51
Source: India Meteorological Department

== Demographics ==
Religions in Bidar City (2011)
Religion	Percent
Hinduism	54.63%
Islam	34.53%
Christianity	6.68%
Buddhism	2.10%
Other or not stated	2.06%
Distribution of religions

At the time of the 2011 census, Bidar had a population of 216,020. Bidar city has a sex ratio of 938 females to males and a literacy rate of 85.90%. Scheduled Castes and Scheduled Tribes made up 14.11% and 4.73% of the population respectively.

Languages of Bidar city (2011)
1. Kannada (52.2%)
2. Urdu (33.3%)
3. Marathi (5.54%)
4. Hindi (3.67%)
5. Telugu (3.33%)
6. Others (1.91%)

At the time of the 2011 census, 52.23% of the population spoke Kannada, 33.32% Urdu, 5.54% Marathi, 3.67% Hindi and 3.33% Telugu as their first language.

== Economy ==
Once a home to many cottage industries, such as cotton and oil-ginning mills, there are now few industries that draw on local raw materials or skills. Even the well known form of local art crafts, bidri ware, is in a state of decline. Increasing prices of materials, especially silver, and declining sales have meant that many of the hereditary artisans are no longer employed in the production of such ware. Bidar city has a large industrial area known as Kolar industrial area.

== Tourism ==
Distance from major Metropolitan cities near to Bidar.

Bidar is symbolically described as City of Whispering Monuments. The mountaintop city that served as the capital of medieval Deccan, has 98 monuments of which four national monuments are protected by the Archaeological Survey of India and 14 by the State Archaeology Department, Karnataka.

Bidar earned a place on the World Monument Watchlist 2014. Of the 741 proposals received from 166 countries, 67 sites from 41 countries were finally selected which were announced by WMF president Bonnie Burnham in New York on 8 October 2013. Along with "the historic city of Bidar", two other sites in India to figure in the list were the house of Sheikh Salim Chisti in Fatehpur Sikri and Juna Mahal in Rajasthan.

The WMF in its current watch site for "the historic city of Bidar" says ″challenges to the site include a lack of integrated conservation and maintenance, environmental pollution, and the construction of new developments and roadways that encroach on the historic fabric. Current land use regulations also threaten the economic livelihood of many of the city's residents, and it is hoped that revised, context-specific planning policies would both protect Bidar's historic assets while also supporting the future of its local population. It is hoped that Watch-listing will spur documentation and analysis of the city's conditions, followed by policy development and applied conservation interventions that will reveal and maintain Bidar's rich heritage, as well as support a robust and sustainable tourist industry.″

=== Mahmud Gawan Madrasa ===
This grandiose madrasa was built by the prime-minister of the Bahmani empire, Mahmud Gawan in the late 15th century. Its only the most imposing building of the Bahmani period, but in its plan and in the general style of its architecture it is a unique monument of its kind in India. The Madrasa, a multi-disciplinary university he set up, which had a library of around 3,000 valuable manuscripts, was severely damaged when gunpowder stored inside the rooms went off during a 27-day siege of the city by Mughal king Aurangazeb in 1656. The Mahmud Gawan Madrasa is protected by the Archaeological Survey of India.

=== Bidar Fort ===
Bidar Fort is considered one of the most formidable forts of the country. Bidar city was distinctly planned and built. The main citadel complex housed the royal places. Mahals and Mosque. Adjoining to this on the southern side, the city was built for the people. Both the citadel complex and city had separate forts for protection the plan of the Bidar city fortification is pentagonal. There are five gateways for entry into the city fort. It is main citadel complex fort which is stronger. It is built on the brink of the plateau. Engineers and architecture of various countries were employed on its design and construction. A Museum is preset there having old armor, old sculptures. including many of the ancient stones,

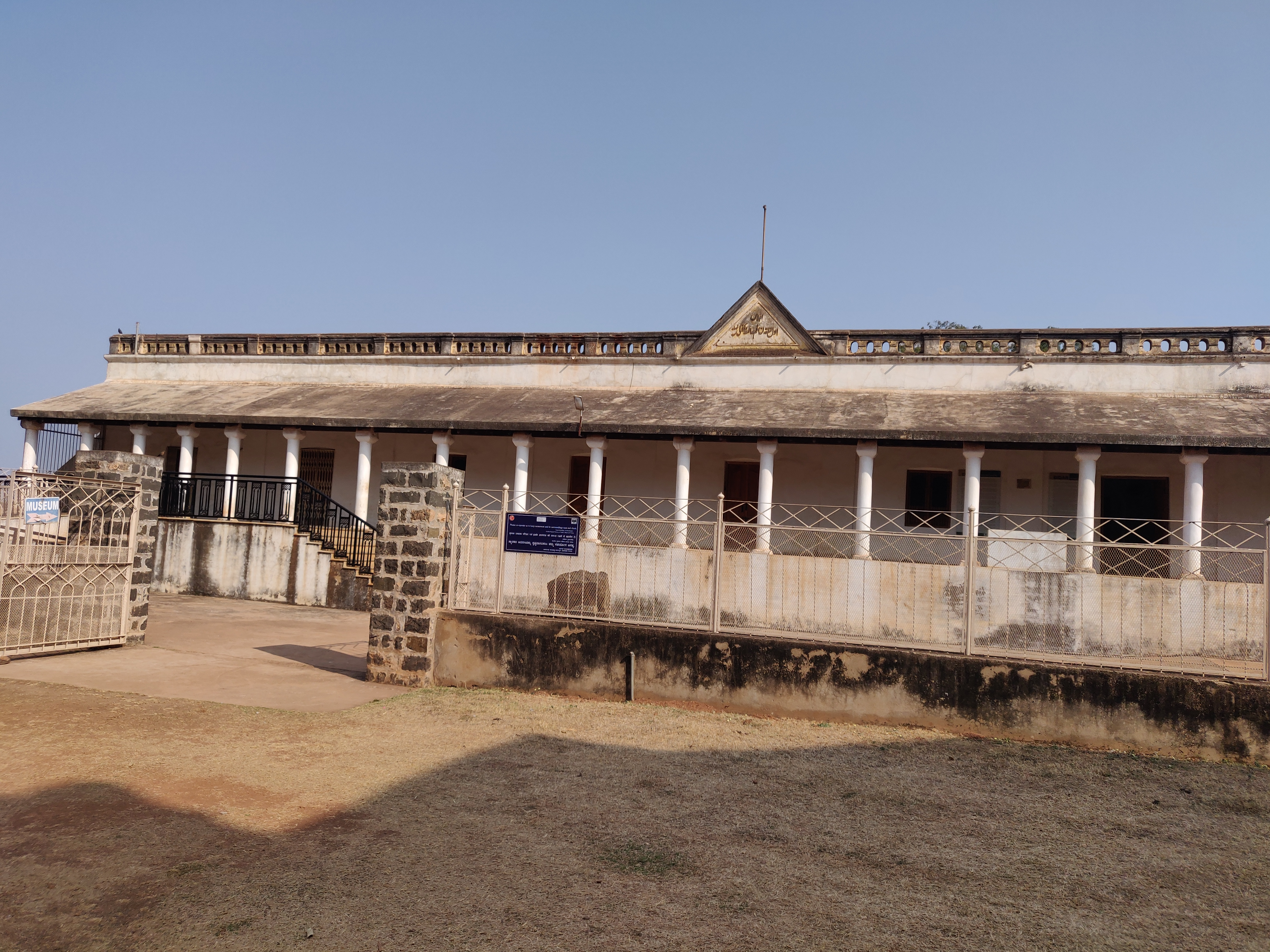
museum inside Bidar fort

- Rangeen Mahal, situated in the fort, near Gumbad Darwaza, is unique because of its decoration with coloured tiles and other art work. Wood carving done there is not only precious but also unique. The walls of Mahal are adorned with mother-of-pearl of the finest quality in laid in jet-black stone. Floral patterns and calligraphic text are also depicted here. Stone carving, stucco art are other attractions of this monument. It was rebuilt during Barid Shahi period. The design of this monument represents a blend of both Hindu and Muslim architecture. There are rooms in the basement of the Rangin Mahal.
- Tarkash Mahal is said to have been built for Turkish wife of the sultan. From the remains of the decorative work found in the ornamentation of the walls, it can be said that the Mahal was built or extended by the Barid Shahi Sultans who had kept large harem with ladies from different nationalities.The rooms were decorated with stucco work.
- Gagan Mahal was originally built by the Bahamani kings and some alterations and additions were made by the Barid Shahi rulers. It has two courts. The outer court was used by the male staff and guards. The inner court also, there are rooms on either side of the covered passage for the accommodation of the guards. The main building of the palace was for the use of the sultan and his harem.
- Takht Mahal, The Royal Palace, was built by Ahemd shah. It was the royal residence. The place was fully decorated with coloured titles and stone carvings part of which can be seen even today. It had two side royal pavilions with lofty arches and a spacious hall at the back of which was the sultan's room. The building had stately dimensions and exquisite surface decoration. The coronations of several Bahamanis and Barid Shahi sultans were held there. From the royal pavilion which is situated behind throne palace one can view the valley and low land below.
- Solah Khamba Mosque (Solah Sutoon Ki Masjid) was built by Qubil Sultani between 1423 and 1424. The mosque derives its name from the 16 pillars that are lined in the front of the structure. Popularly known as the Zanana Masjid, this mosque is about 90 metres long and 24 metres wide. Behind the southern wall of this mosque, there is a large well. Characterised by columns, arches and domes, this mosque is one of the largest in India.

=== Other monuments ===
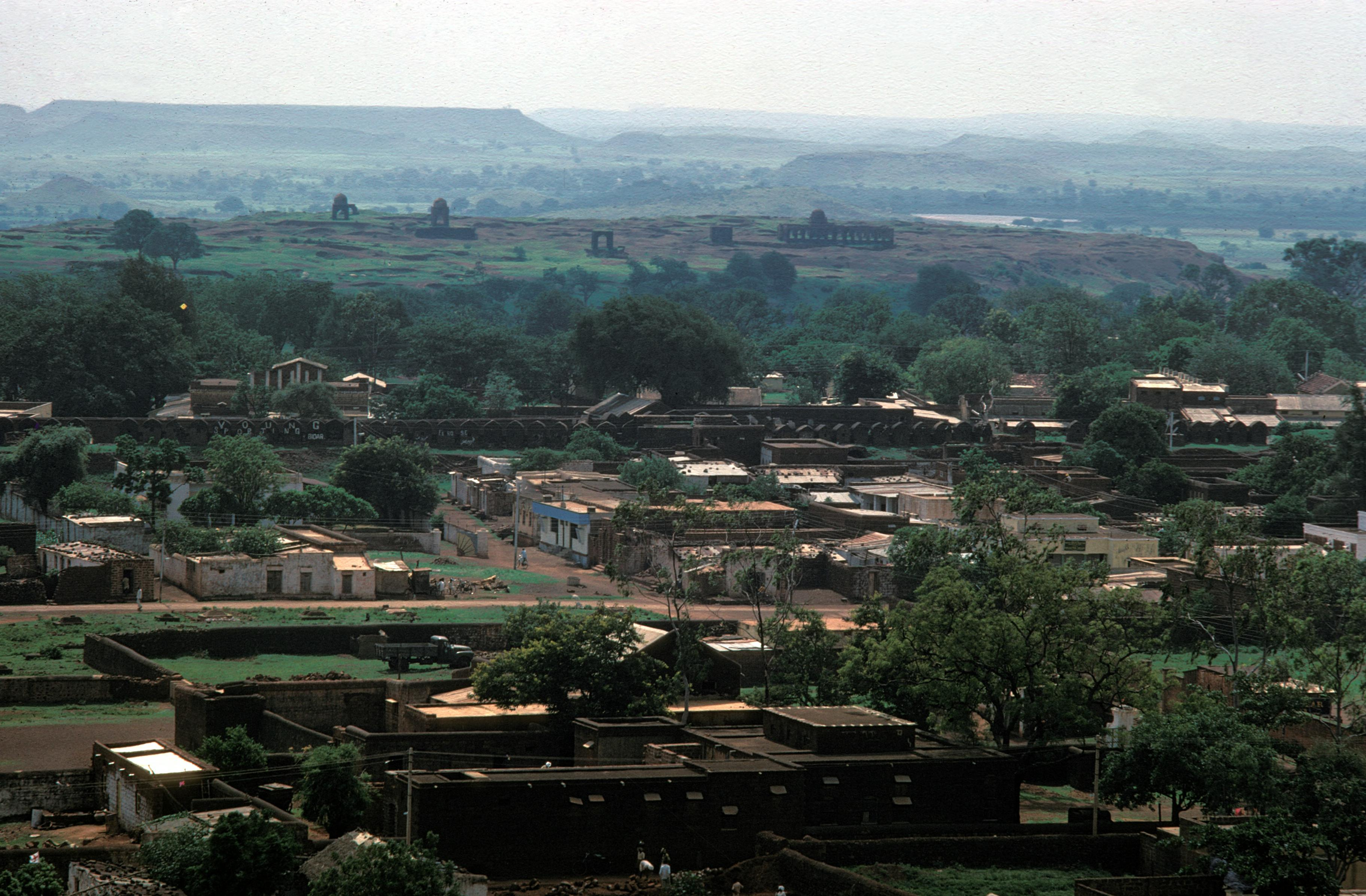
Habshi Kot, seen in the background

Apart from the fort Bidar houses several historical structures consisting of a couple of tomb complexes, a madrasa, a tower and a few gateways along with the fortification wall topped with battlements.

- Chaubara is a tall tower, facing in four directions. This is an old cylindrical tower of 22 meters, height is situated in the centre of Bidar city. It was used as a watchtower, commanding a fine view of the entire plateau from the top. A winding staircase of eight steps leads to the top of the tower, a clock is being placed on top of the tower, can be viewed from all the four directions.
- Jama Masjid, a large mosque with no minarets, located near Chaubara.
- Bahmani Tombs called as "Ashtur"
- Chaukhandi of Hazrat Khalil Ullah
- Barid Shahi tombs
- Chaukhandi of Hazrat Khalil Ullah
- Habshi Kot (lit. Abyssinian fortress), is a hillock situated on the outskirts of Bidar. It contains the tombs of Abyssinian noblemen who were employed in the Bahmani and Barid Shahi courts.

== Religious places ==
Gurudwara Nanak Jhira Sahib is considered one of the holiest places for Sikh devotees in India. It is believed that the first Sikh Guru, Shri Guru Nanak Dev Ji, visited this site during a famine in the region.

Sri Mailar Mallanna Temple is a Hindu temple dedicated to the god Khandoba (also known as Mailar Mallanna and a form of the god Shiva, in Mailar or Khanapur village). It is situated on the Bidar-Udgir Road, 15 km from Bidar.

== Art ==
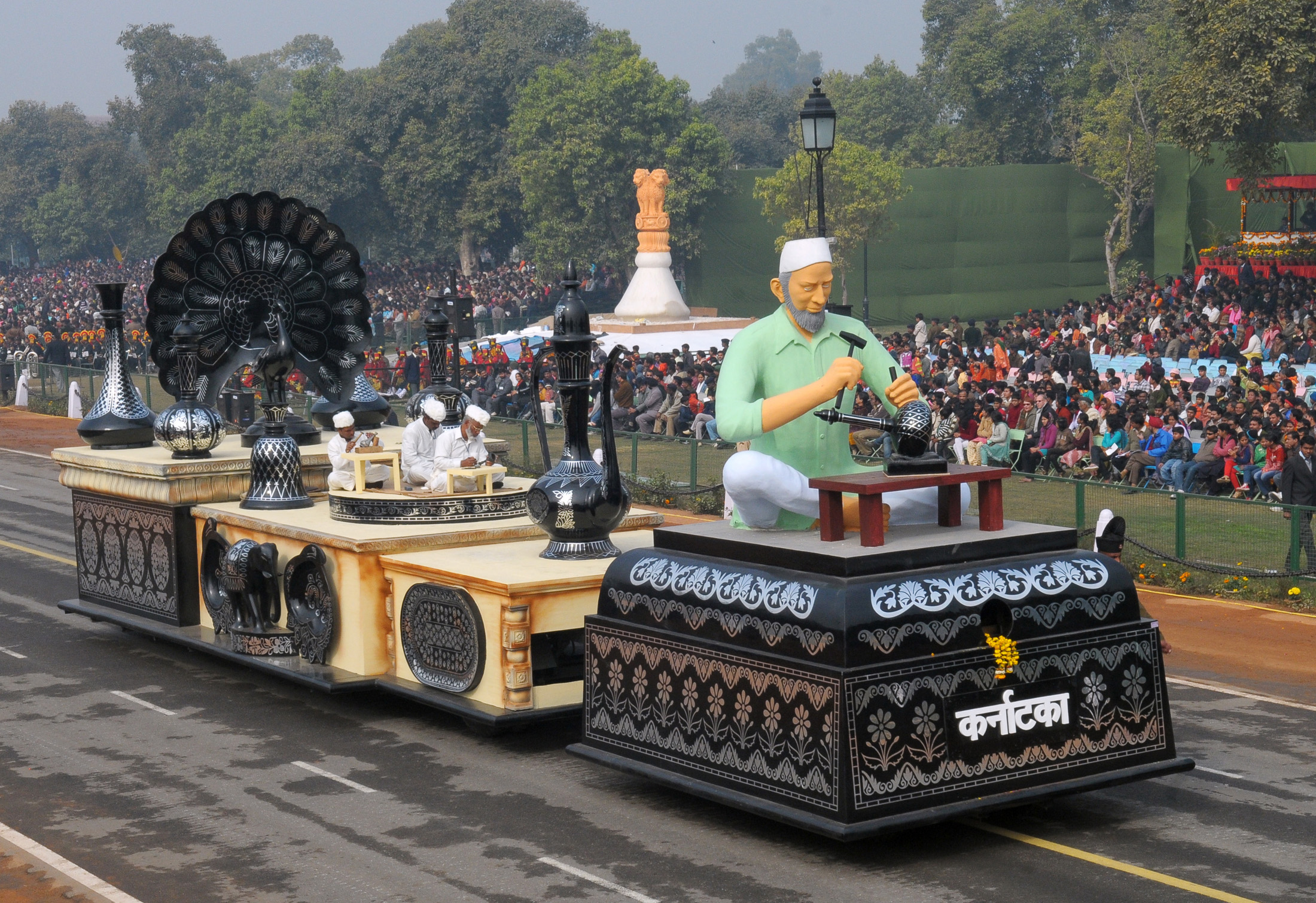
The Karnataka tableau depicting Bidriware Handicraft from Bidar passes through the Rajpath during the Republic Day Parade 2011.

=== Bidri wares ===
Bidriware, one of the rarest and most intricate art forms is now unique to the city. This native art form has obtained Geographical Indications (GI) registry. The various art forms created by artists from Bidar city centuries ago are now major attractions in museums such as Victoria and Albert Museum, London, the National Museum in New Delhi and Indian Museum in Kolkata.

The Karnataka tableau at the 2011 Republic Day Parade at Rajpath in New Delhi featured Bidriware and Bidri artisans from Bidar.

Rehaman Patel did an extensive research in Bidri Art from Gulbarga University. His book in Kannada version (2012) and English version (2017) also published on Bidri Art.

All the dignitaries & guests of XIX Commonwealth Games 2010 were presented with mementos hand crafted in Bidri art. This art form is the Union government's choice for souvenirs at the World Economic Forum in Davos. The Kingfisher company owner Vijay Mallya has a bidri dining table with floral designs made of nearly 3.5 kg silver.

== Transport ==
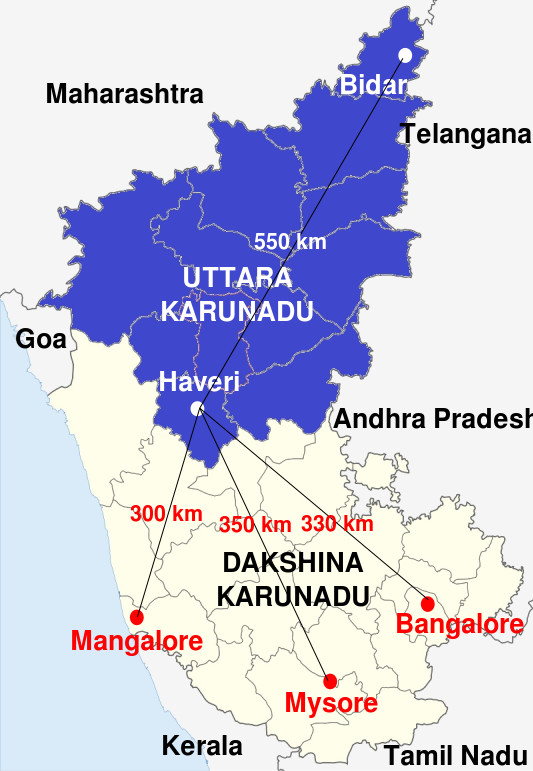
Distance from major cities of Karnataka to Bidar

=== Rail ===
Bidar has connectivity with Bengaluru, Hyderabad, Sainagar Shirdi, Parbhani Jn, Aurangabad, Latur, Nanded, Manmad, Mumbai, Visakhapatnam, Machilipatnam, Vijayawada and Renigunta (according to railway budget 2014–15) Construction of the Gulbarga-Bidar link is completed which was inaugurated by Prime Minister Narendra Modi. Bidar-Hyderabad inter-city train service became operative in September 2012. A Bidar-Yeshwantpur (Daily) express train and Bidar-LTT Mumbai express train service has been started recently. Another train starting from Bidar through Latur to Mumbai started, which runs on Thursday, Saturday and Sunday.

=== Air ===
Bidar Airport, also known as Bidar Air Force Station, (IATA: IXX, ICAO: VOBR) is a military airbase cum Domestic Airport in Bidar, Karnataka, India.

The city is home to an air force station. Star Air operates 3 days a week flight between Bidar (IXX) and Bengaluru (BLR).

=== Road ===
Frequent KSRTC buses to Kalaburgi (Gulbarga), Hyderabad, Latur, Udgir, Nanded, Solapur. Also Volvo services to Bengaluru, Hubli, Belgavi, Davangere, Mumbai, Mangalore and Pune.

== Corporation ==
Bidar was officially upgraded from a City Municipal Council (CMC) to a City Corporation in February 2025, with the final notification process currently underway. The decision was initially approved by the Karnataka state cabinet on September 17, 2024, and received final approval during another cabinet meeting in February 2025. The upgrade was made possible after incorporating several surrounding villages to meet the required population threshold of over three lakh people. A 30-day window for objections was set following the final approval before the corporation officially comes into existence.

== Education institutions ==
- Bidar Institute of Medical Sciences (BRIMS)
- Guru Nanak Dev Engineering College, Bidar
- Karnataka Veterinary, Animal and Fisheries Sciences University
- Shaheen Group of Institutions, Bidar

== Gallery ==
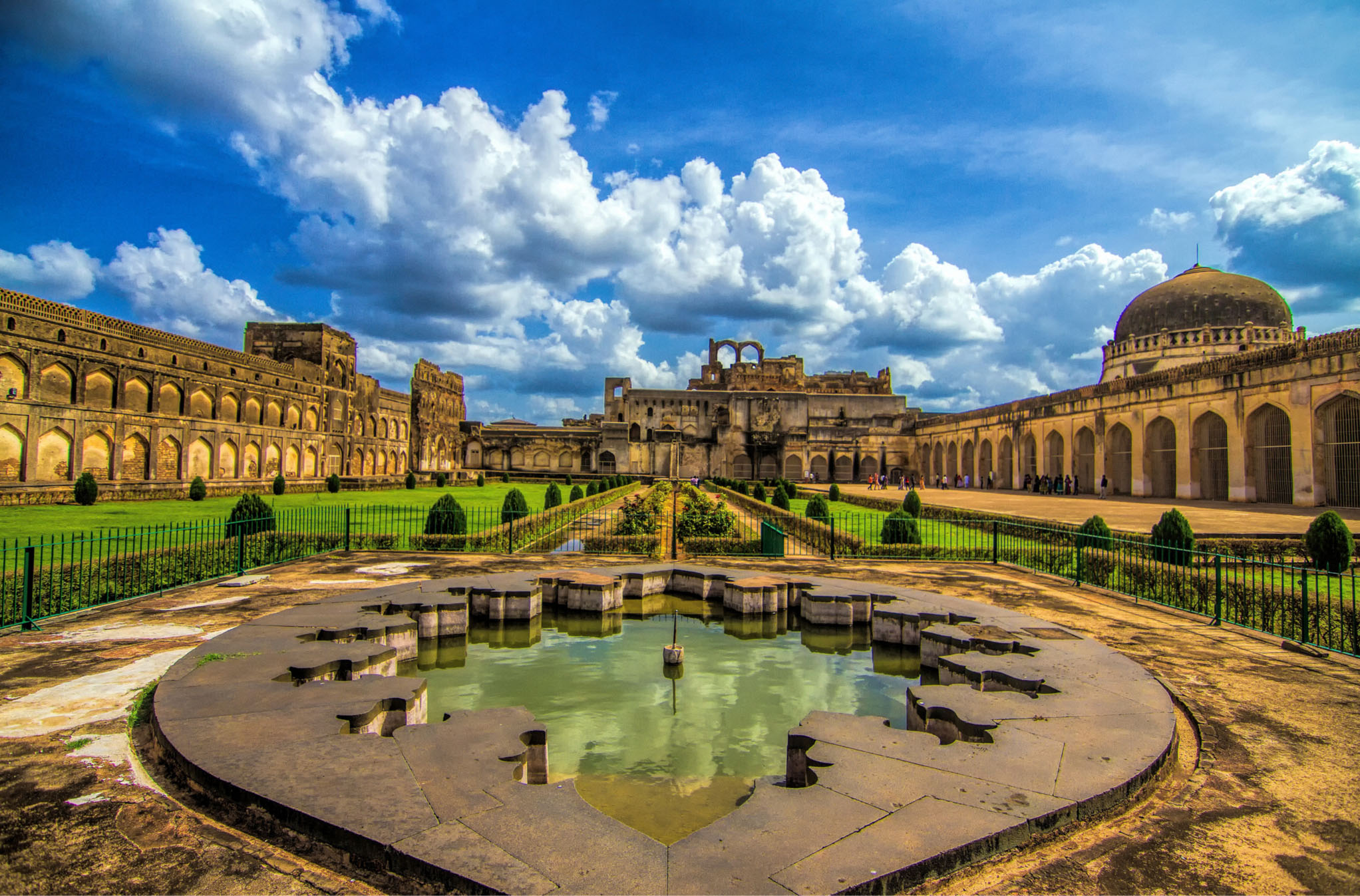
Fort Garden Bidar

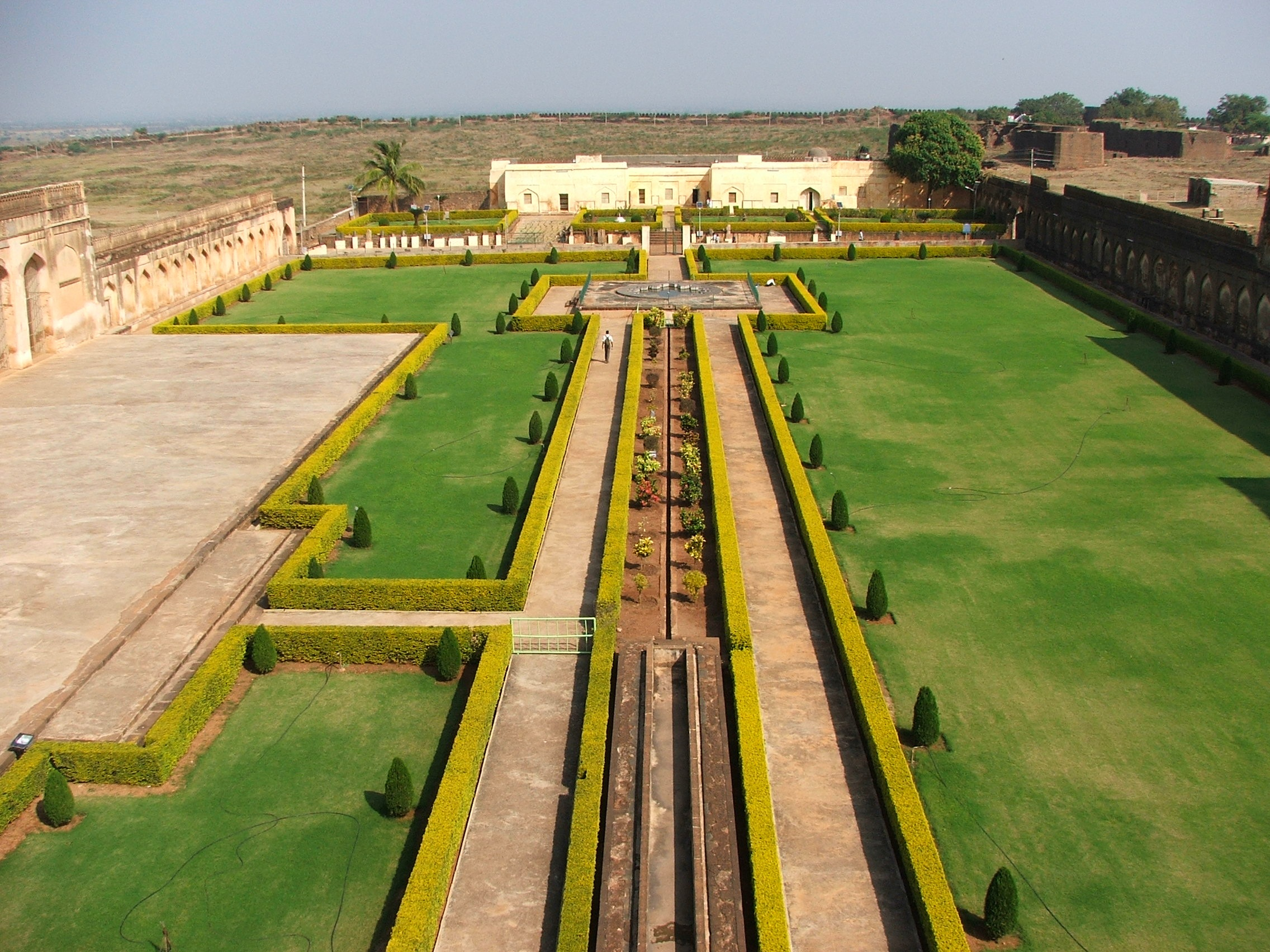
Bidar Fort (inside view garden)

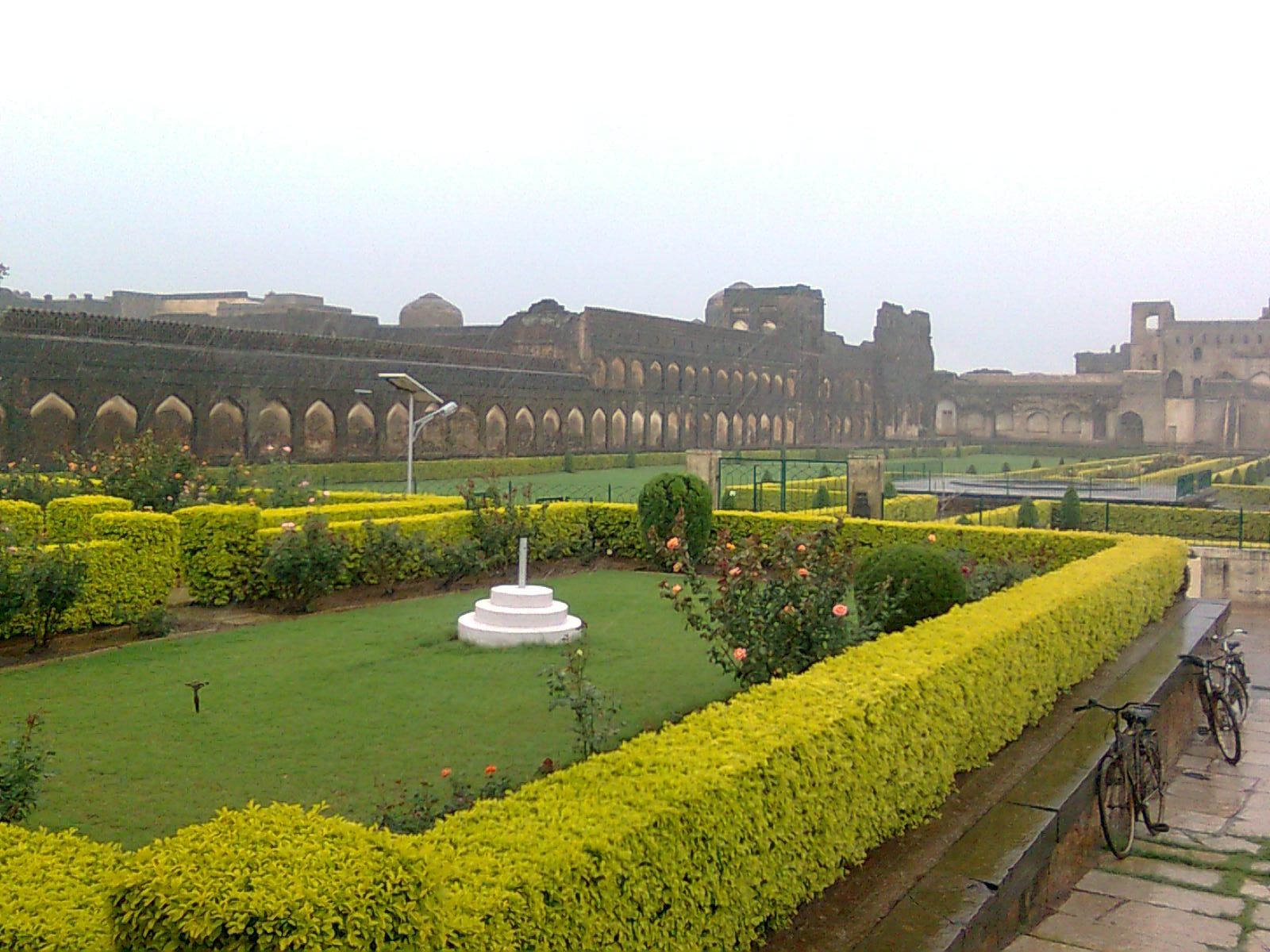
Bidar Fort (inside view)

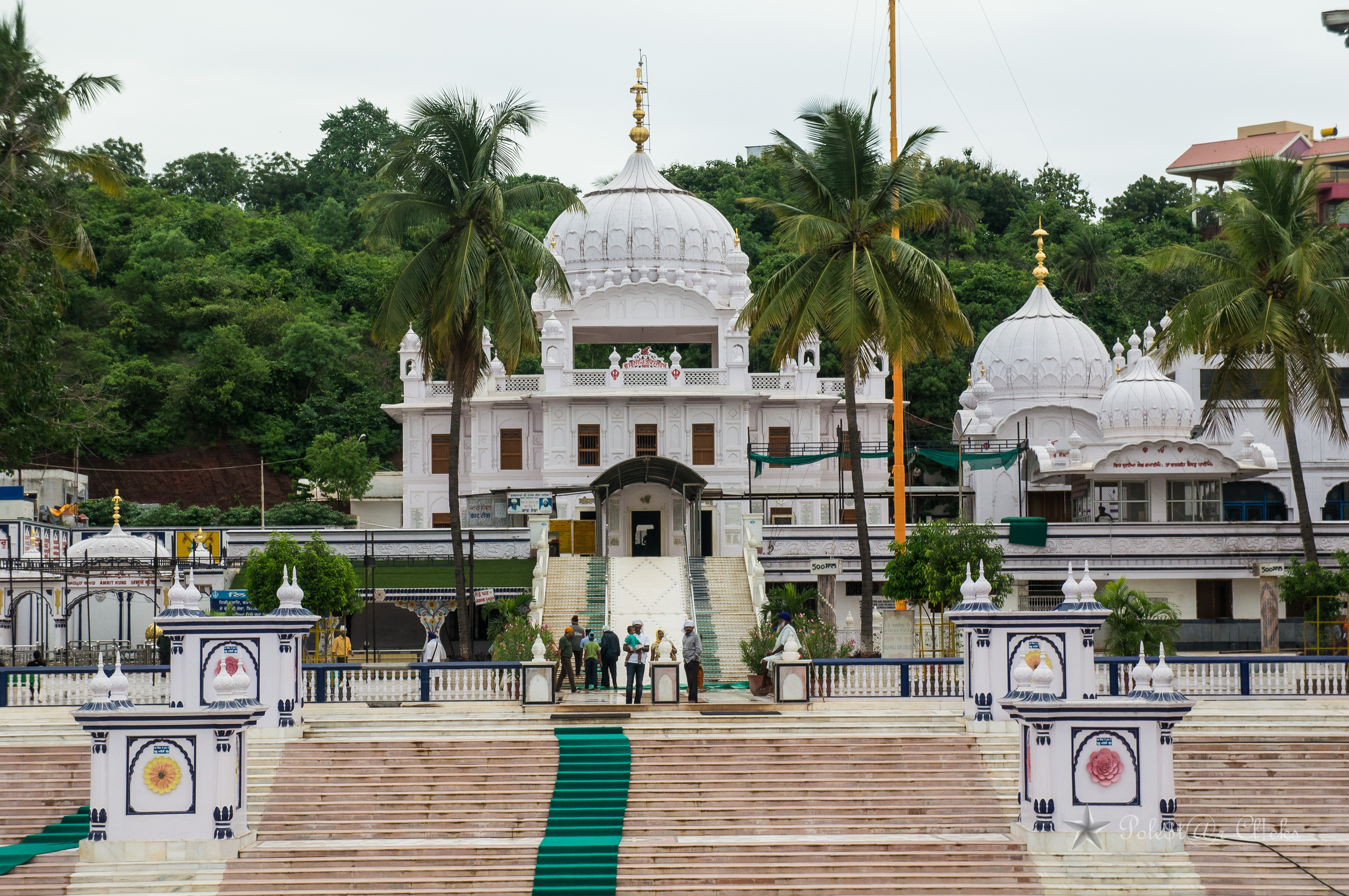
Guru Nanak Jhira Sahib

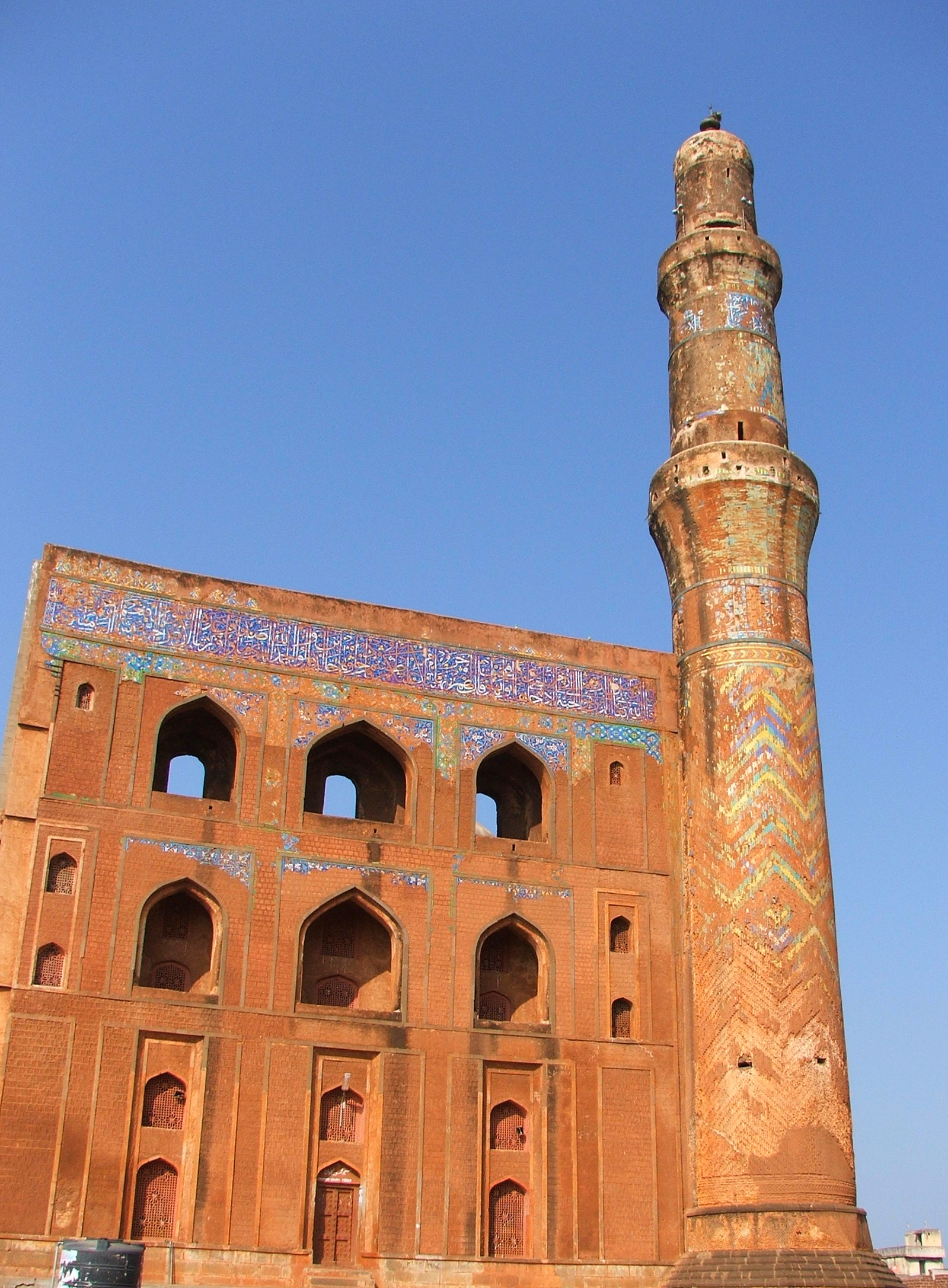
Mahmud Gawan Madrasa

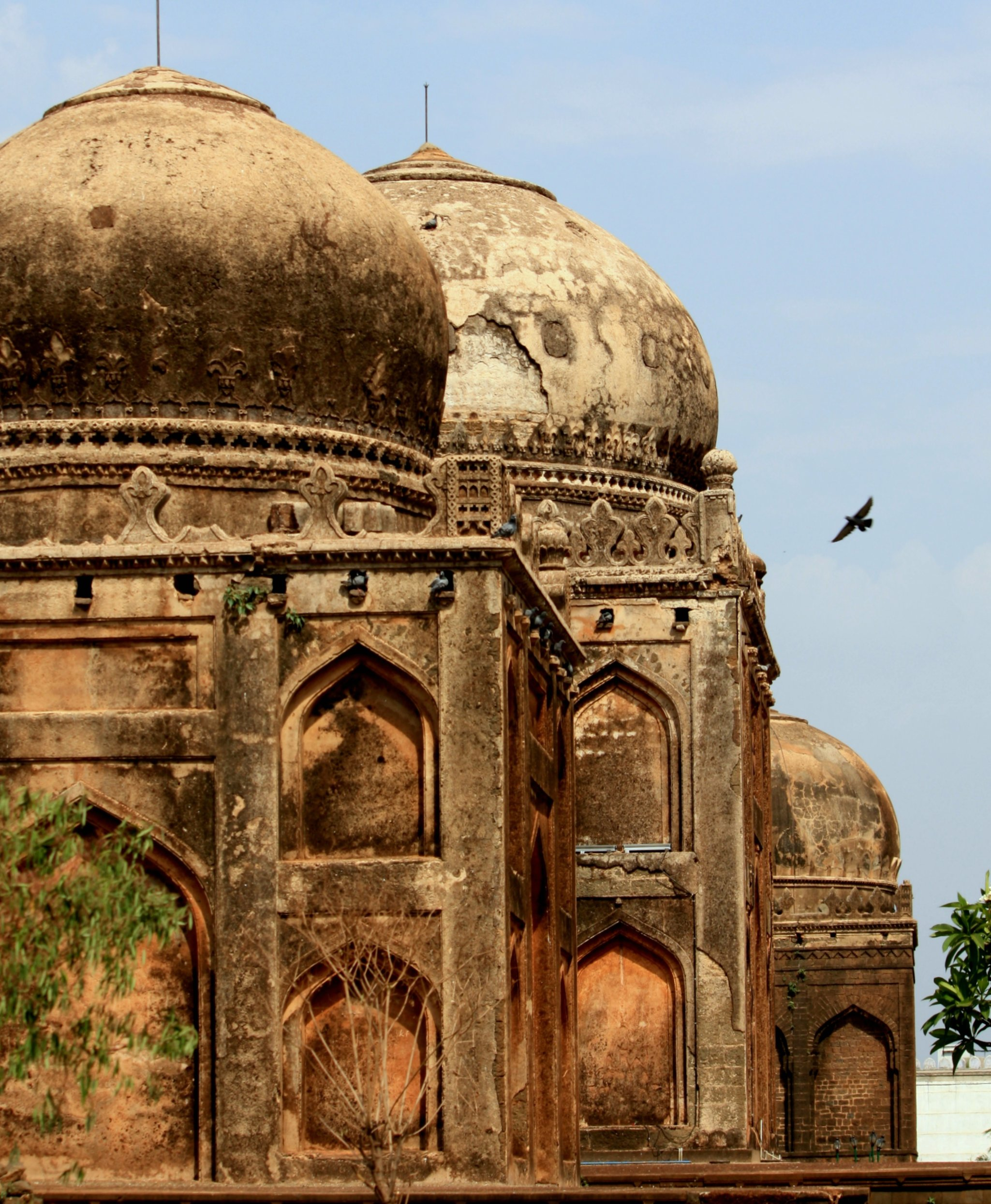
Ashtur Tombs

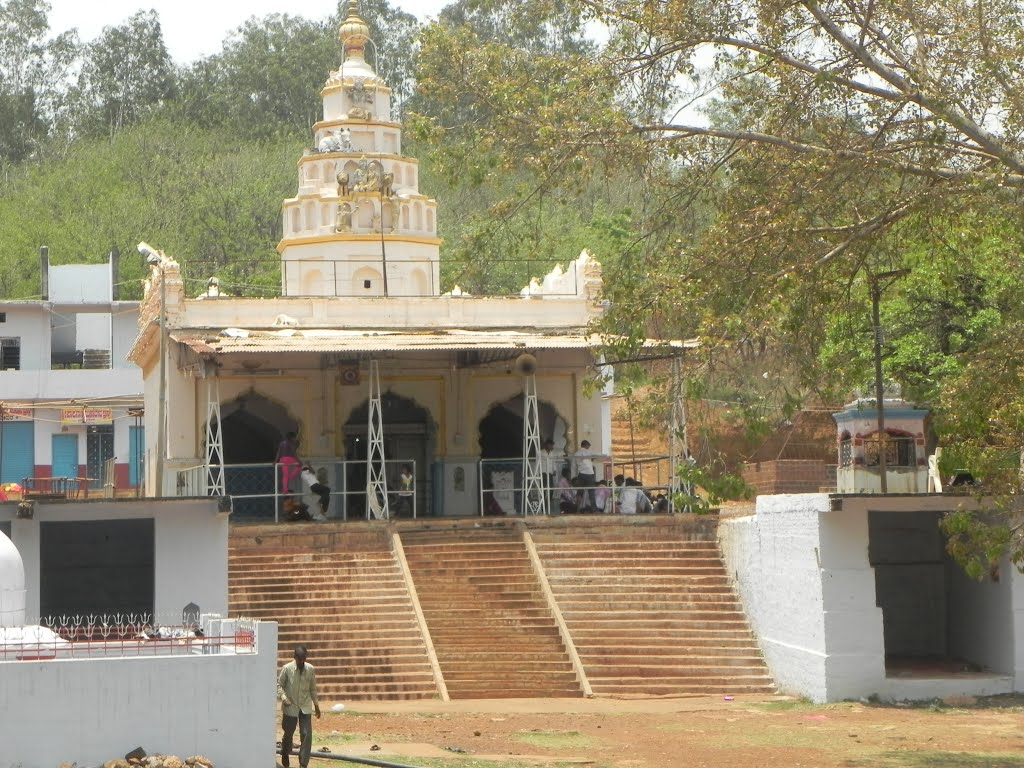
Papnash Temple
