= Tipu Sultan Masjid Tollygunge =

Mosque in Tollygunge, Kolkata

Tipu Sultan Masjid
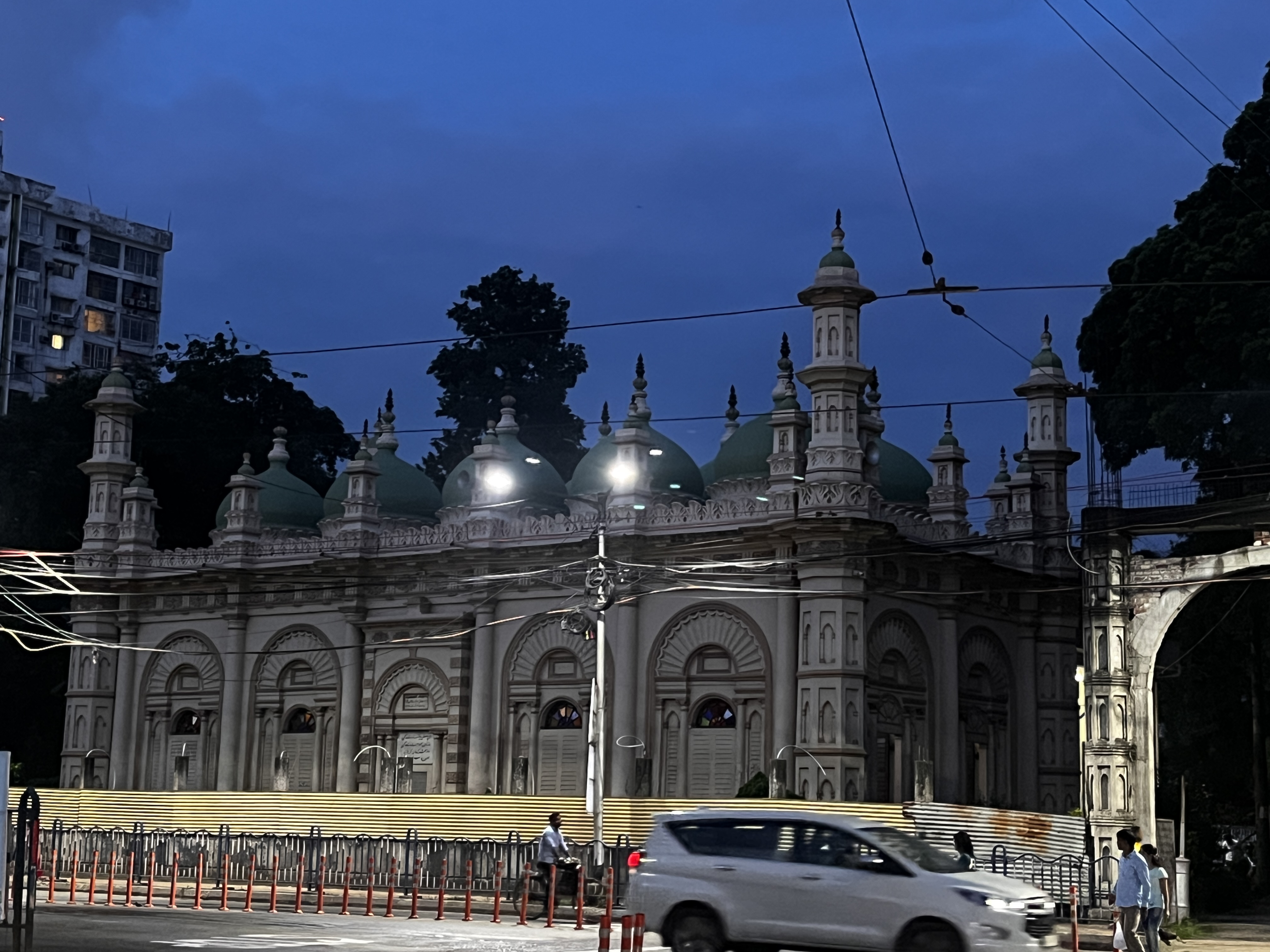
- The mosque at night, in 2023

- Location of the mosque in Kolkata

Religion
- Affiliation: Sunni Islam
- Sect: Barelvi and Sufism
- Festival: Eid-ul-Milad-un-Nabi
- Ecclesiastical or organizational status: Mosque
- Leadership: Imam Abdus Sukur
- Status: Active

Location
- Location: 135 Prince Anwar Shah Road, Tollygunge, Kolkata, West Bengal
- Country: India
- Interactive map of Tipu Sultan Masjid
- Administration: Ghulam Mohammed Wakf Estate; Anwar Shah Committee
- Coordinates: 22°30′06″N 88°20′43″E

Architecture
- Type: Mosque architecture
- Style: Indo-Islamic
- Founder: Ghulam Muhammad Sultan Sahib
- Groundbreaking: 1852
- Completed: 1860

Specifications
- Dome: Six (maybe more)
- Minaret: Four (maybe more)

The Tipu Sultan Masjid, also called Shaheed Tipu Sultan Masjid, is a Sunni mosque, located on Prince Anwar Shah Road in Tollygunge, Kolkata, in the state of West Bengal, India.

== Background ==
Tipu Sultan was the ruler of the Kingdom of Mysore and well known as a scholar and poet. The Tipu Sultan Masjid was built in Calcutta (now Kolkata) by his 11th son, Prince Gholam Mohammed. His youngest son built this mosque in memory of his father, far away from Mysore, in Calcutta, due to family history. Tipu Sultan was engaged in a series of wars with the British East India Company, which had sought trade favours from the Sultan at first, and later tried to annex his Kingdom by military force. After the last war, with Tipu's death on the battlefield, and six years after Tipu's death, the entire family was exiled to Calcutta by the British Government. During that period, the capital of Mysore, Srirangapatnam, was captured by British Army. Gholam Mohammed was a child when arrived in Calcutta and developed into a man of varied qualities. He was involved in many public works and associated with a committee formed for maintenance of roadways and buildings.

== Construction ==
The mosque was built between in 1852 and 1860 by Prince Gholam Mohammed with the same design and look as the earlier–constructed Tipu Sultan Mosque on Dharamtalla Street, completed in 1842.

== Leadership ==
Abdus Sukur is the Imam of the mosque, that is affiliated with the Barelvi and Sufi movements.

== See also ==
- Islam in India
- List of mosques in India
- List of mosques in Kolkata
