= Aminia =

Restaurant chain in West Bengal(Kolkata), India

- Interactive map of Aminia

Restaurant information
- Established: 1929
- Food type: Mughlai cuisine
- Dress code: casual
- Location: 6A, SN Banerjee Road, New Market Area, Dharmatala, Kolkata, West Bengal, 700087, India
- Coordinates: 22°33′45″N 88°21′09″E
- Other locations: Rajarhat (Chinar Park); Jessore Road; Shyambazar; Golpark; Behala; Barrackpore; Serampore; Sodepur; Tollygunge; Garia; Siliguri; Kolaghat
- Website: aminia.co.in

Aminia is a historic chain of restaurants specialising in traditional Mughlai and Awadhi cuisine, headquartered in Kolkata, West Bengal, India. Established in 1929, Aminia has grown from a single outlet on Zakaria Street to become one of Eastern India's most renowned restaurant chains, with outlets across West Bengal and internationally in Dubai.

== Cuisine and Specialities ==
=== Signature Dishes ===
- Kolkata Biryani: Aminia's flagship offering features the distinctive Kolkata-style biryani with potatoes, tender mutton or chicken, fragrant rice, and boiled eggs. The restaurant played a significant role in commercializing the use of potatoes in biryani, following the tradition established by Nawab Wajid Ali Shah.
- Aminia Special Curry - Created in 1929 by founder Abdul Rahim specifically to appeal to British patrons, this dish features mutton chunks, vegetables (carrots, potatoes, onions, tomatoes), and boiled eggs in a light, aromatic gravy that blends Mughlai flavors with subtle taste profiles.

=== Other Notable Dishes ===
- Mutton Rezala: A creamy, subtly spiced signature dish
- Mutton Pasanda: Tender mutton slices simmered in a rich, nutty gravy with royal undertones
- Lahori Chicken: A bold, tangy chicken preparation infused with aromatic spices from Punjab’s heartland
- Reshmi Kebab: Silky-soft chicken skewers marinated in creamy spices and grilled to perfection
- Zafrani Biryani: Fragrant basmati rice layered with saffron and succulent meat, a regal feast in every bite
- Firni (traditional dessert): A chilled, velvety rice pudding delicately flavored with cardamom and rose essence

== History ==
=== Early Beginnings (1929-1947) ===
Aminia's journey began in 1929 when Abdul Rahim opened the first outlet on Zakaria Street in Kolkata, directly opposite the historic Nakhoda Masjid. The restaurant was established with the vision of bringing authentic Lucknowi Awadhi cuisine to Kolkata. The timing was significant, as it coincided with the broader culinary transformation of Kolkata following Nawab Wajid Ali Shah's exile from Lucknow to the city, which had introduced Awadhi cuisine and the unique Kolkata biryani with potatoes.

=== Expansion and the New Market Legacy (1947-1970s) ===
A pivotal moment in Aminia's history came on August 15, 1947 - coinciding with India's Independence Day - when Abdul Rahim's sons, Abdul Qayum and Mohammed Amin, opened what would become the chain's most iconic outlet in New Market (Sir Stuart Hogg Market) at Futnani Chambers near the Kolkata Municipal Corporation. This New Market branch became the largest and most well-known Aminia outlet. The brothers adapted their menu to suit the Bengali palate, reducing spiciness and oiliness while incorporating sweeter elements through increased use of onions in dishes like mutton rezala and chicken chaap. They also modified gravy consistency to create lighter 'jhol'-style preparations, exemplified by their famous "Aminia Special Curry".

=== Modern Era and Expansion (2012-Present) ===
The restaurant chain is currently operated by the third and fourth generations of the founding family. Key figures in the current leadership include Asher Ather and Kabir Azhar, representing the fourth generation, along with Azra Asher Ather (sales director) and Mohammed Azhar (Chairman & Director). The modern expansion phase began earnestly in 2012, growing from the original outlets to 11 locations by 2023. Under the new leadership, Aminia has embraced both traditional values and contemporary business practices, including digital transformation and strategic expansion beyond Kolkata and West Bengal. In 2025, Aminia also opened its first international outlet in Al Karama, Dubai.
