= Tipu Sultan Mosque =

Mosque in Kolkata, West Bengal, India

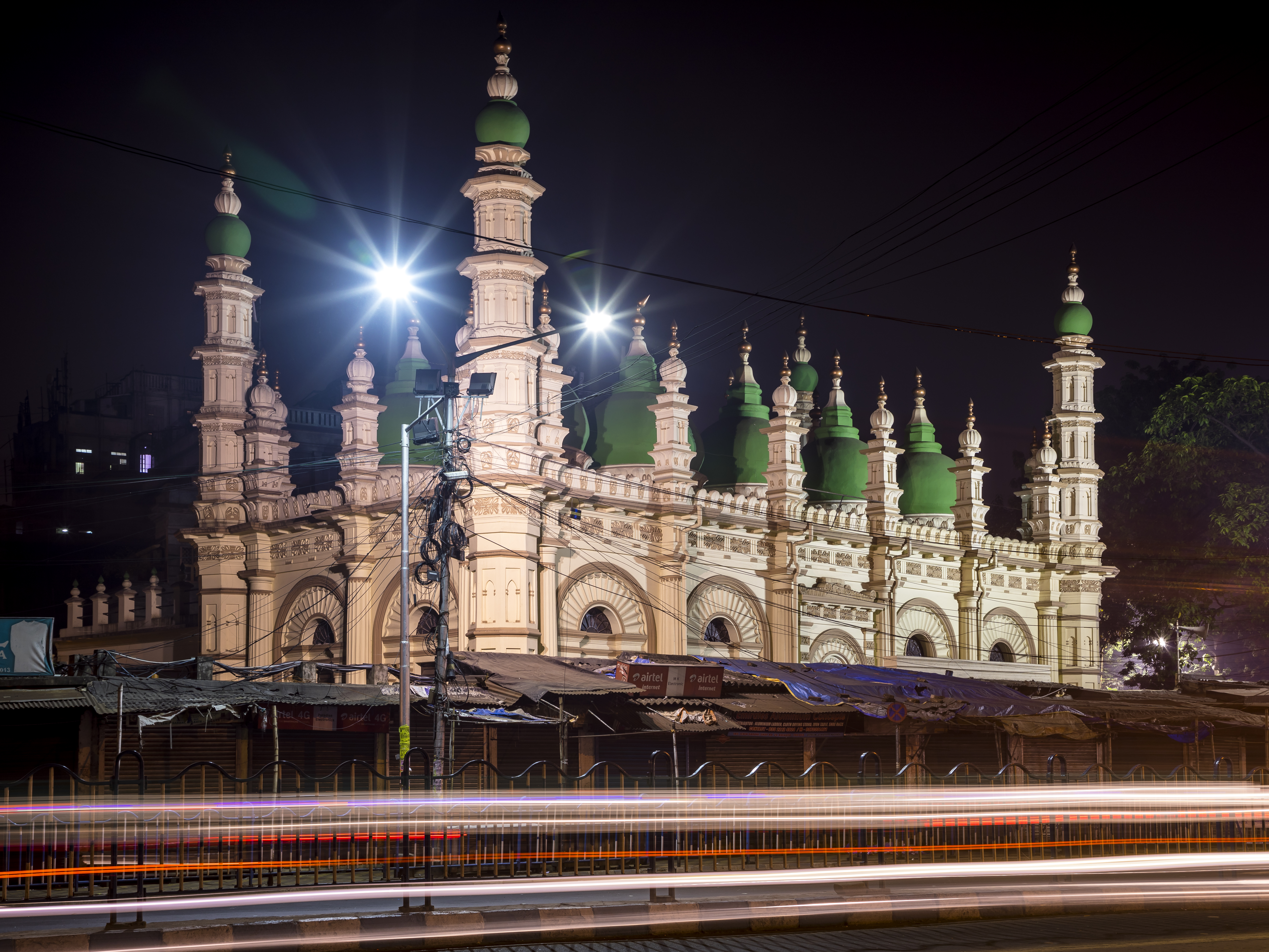
- The mosque at night, in 2016

- Location of the mosque in Kolkata

Religion
- Affiliation: Islam
- Ecclesiastical or organisational status: Mosque
- Leadership: Imam Noor ur Rahmaan Barkati
- Status: Active

Location
- Location: 185 Dharmatala Street, Kolkata, West Bengal
- Country: India
- Administration: Ghulam Mohammed Wakf Estate
- Coordinates: 22°33′55″N 88°21′06″E

Architecture
- Type: Mosque architecture
- Style: Indo-Islamic
- Founder: Prince Gholam Mohammed
- Completed: 1842

Specifications
- Direction of façade: South
- Capacity: 1,000 worshipers
- Dome: 16
- Minaret: Four

The Tipu Sultan Mosque, officially known as the Tipu Sultan Shahi Mosque, also known locally as the Tipu Sultan Masjid, and formerly known as the Dharmatala Mosque, is a mosque located in Kolkata, in the state of West Bengal, India. The mosque is named after Tipu Sultan, a famous ruler of Mysore. Located at 185 Dharmatala Street, the mosque is renowned for its architectural and cultural heritage relics.

== Background ==
Tipu Sultan was the ruler of the Kingdom of Mysore and well known as a scholar and poet. The Tipu Sultan Mosque was built in Calcutta (now Kolkata) by his 11th son, Prince Gholam Mohammed. His youngest son built this mosque in memory of his father, far away from Mysore, in Calcutta, due to family history. Tipu Sultan was engaged in a series of wars with the British East India Company, which had sought trade favours from the Sultan at first, and later tried to annex his Kingdom by military force. After the last war, with Tipu's death on the battlefield, and six years after Tipu's death, the entire family was exiled to Calcutta by the British Government. During that period, the capital of Mysore, Srirangapatnam, was captured by British Army. Gholam Mohammed was a child when arrived in Calcutta and developed into a man of varied qualities. He was involved in many public works and associated with a committee formed for maintenance of roadways and buildings.

== Construction ==
The mosque was built in 1842 by Prince Ghulam Mohammed, the youngest son of Tipu Sultan. An identical mosque, the Tipu Sultan Masjid Tollygunge, was built earlier in 1835, also by Ghulam Mohammed. Ghulam Mohammed used his own money to purchase a land in the central area of Calcutta and built this mosque. The Ghulam Mohammed Wakf Estate manages both of the mosques.

In early 1980's the Tipu Sultan Masjid was damaged due to the construction works of Kolkata Metro Railway in the Esplanade area. The move was regarded as a highly communal stand of the West Bengal State Government. The Tipu Sultan Shahi Masjid Protection and Welfare Committee was founded in the late 1980s by Seraj Mubarki, Mohammad Sharfuddin, to inform people about the damage caused to the mosque by the Kolkata Metro company. The committee negotiated with the Kolkata Metro authorities to repair the damage caused by the construction underneath the building. The authorities agreed to demolish the damaged part of the mosque and rebuild it.

The committee continue to play an active role in the daily affairs of the mosque. Committee members raised ₹21,501 for the 2004 Tsunami victims as part of the Prime Minister's Tsunami fund. The committee went on a five-day hunger strike to seek the intervention of the central government when a Muslim dargah was ruined in Vadodara. The fast was later broken with an initiative by H.E. Honorable Governor Shri. Gopal Krishna Gandhi who offered glass of juice to the fasters and later condemned attacks on Hindu temples in Pakistan and the attacks on Christian missionaries in Orissa and other parts of India.

== Gallery ==
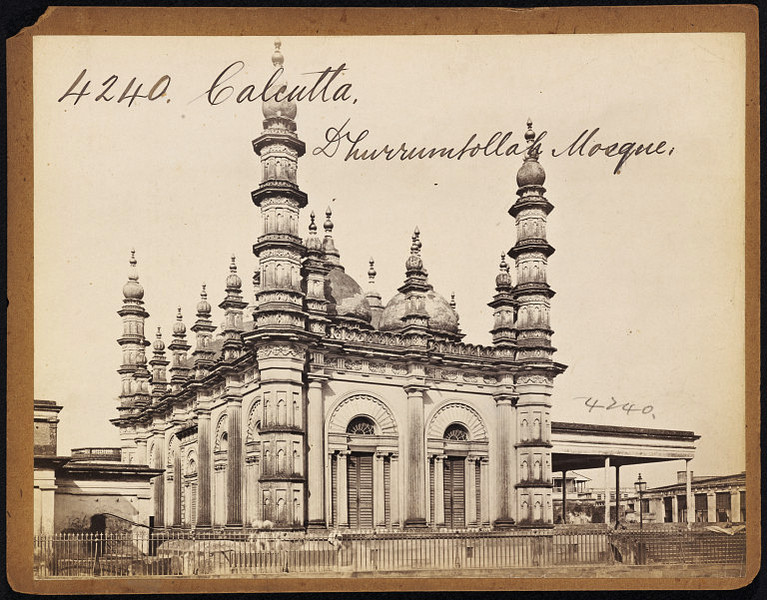
Dhurrumtollah Mosque at Calcutta, by Francis Frith

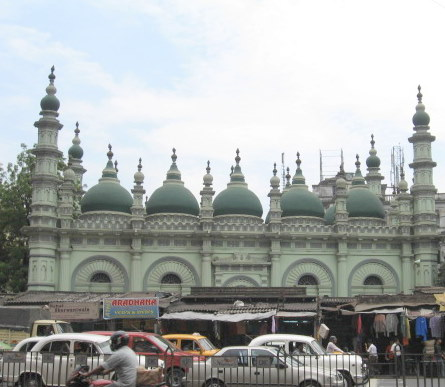
The mosque in 2007

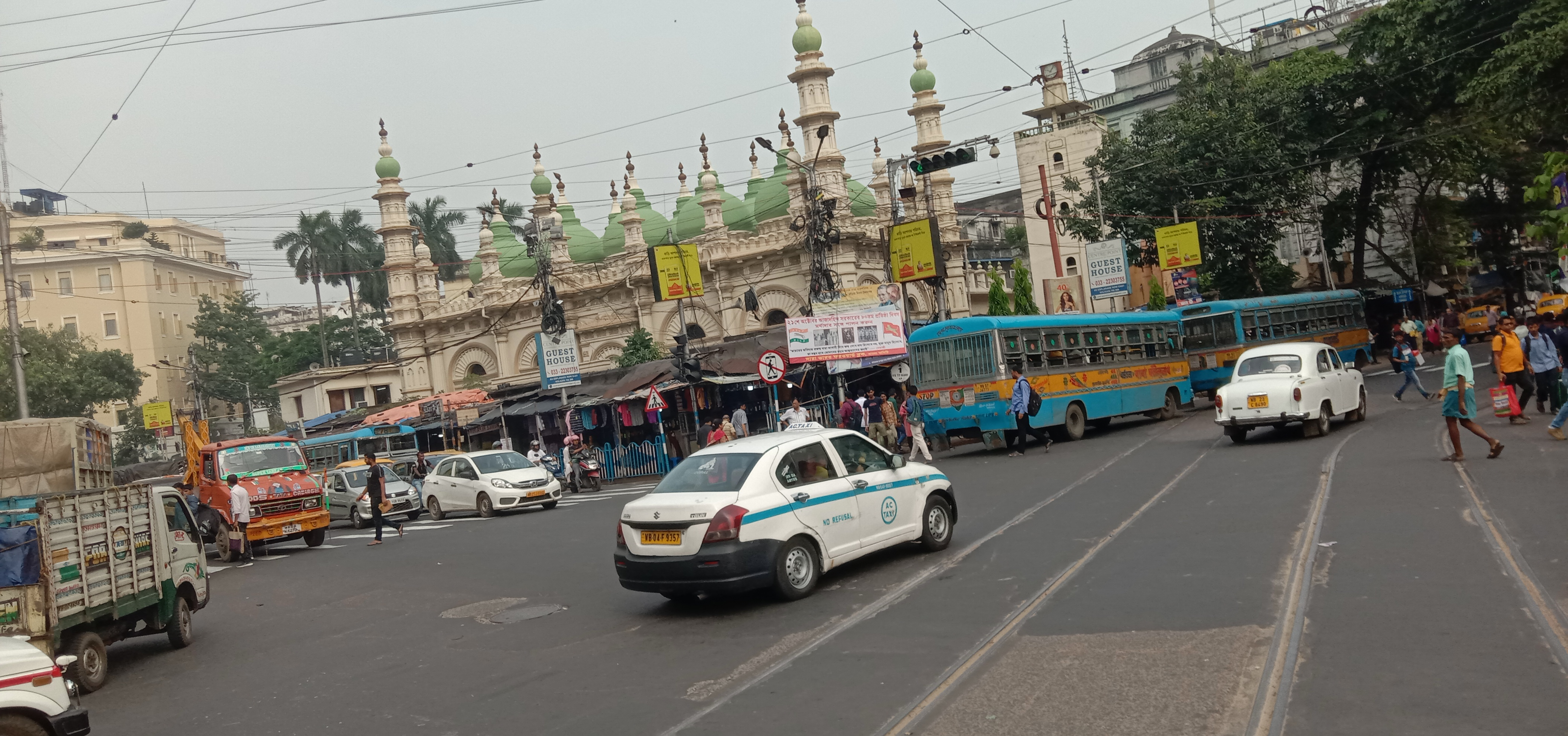
Traffic near the mosque in 2022

== See also ==
- Islam in India
- List of mosques in India
- List of mosques in Kolkata
