= Zakaria Street =

Street in Kolkata, India

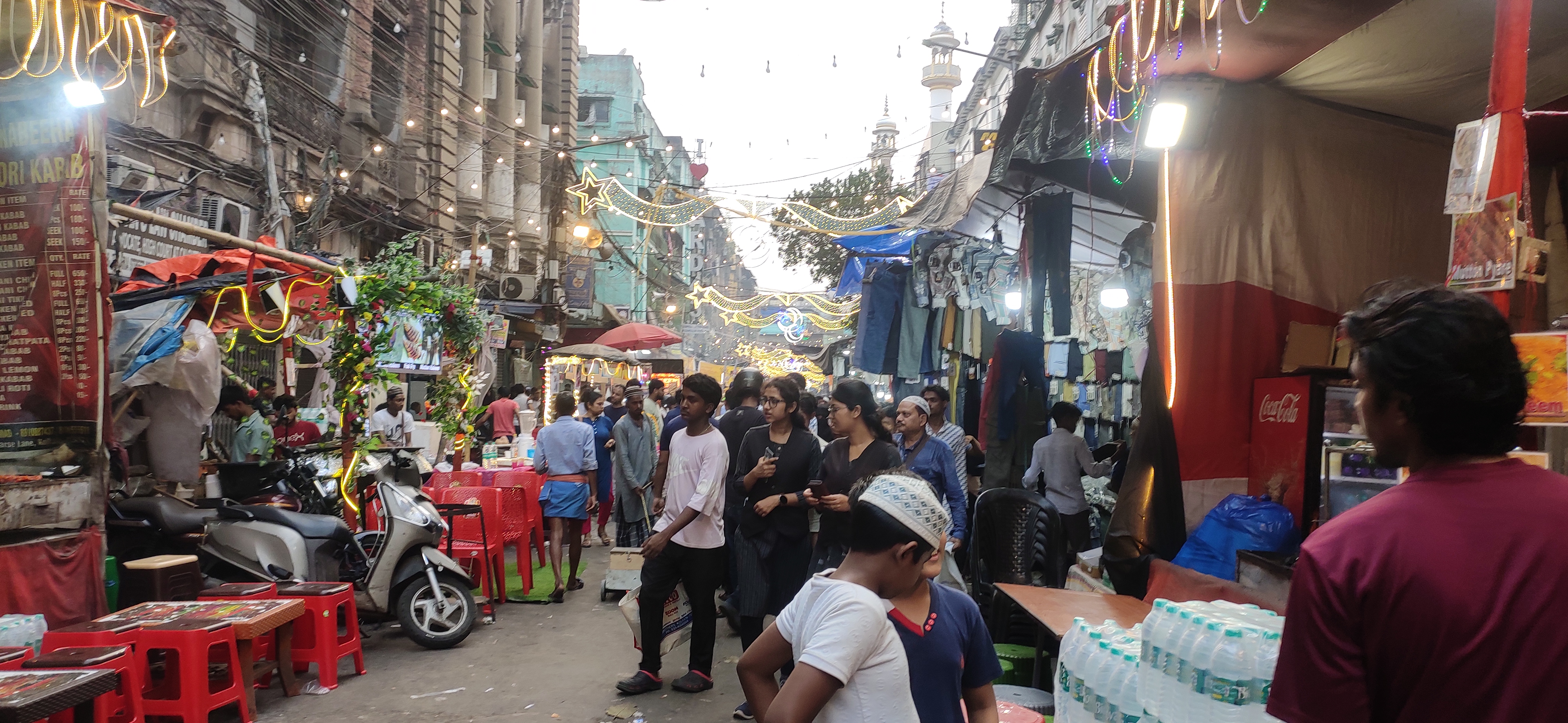
- The street in 2026
- Interactive map of Zakaria Street
- Native name: জাকারিয়া স্ট্রিট (Bengali); زکریا اسٹریٹ (Urdu); ज़कारिया स्ट्रीट (Hindi)
- Maintained by: Kolkata Municipal Corporation
- Location: Central Kolkata, India
- Postal code: 700073
- Nearest Kolkata Metro station: M.G. Road, Central Metro
- Coordinates: 22.5771521°N 88.358129°E
- West end: Rabindra Sarani
- East end: Chittaranjan Avenue

Other
- Known for: Restaurants

Zakaria Street is a street that joins Rabindra Sarani with Chittaranjan Avenue (Central Avenue) in Central Kolkata. Nakhoda Mosque is situated in this street. It is the biggest ramadan market in Kolkata. Mohammad Ali Park is located very close to this street. This street is very popular to food bloggers.

== History ==
During the colonial period, the British authority divided the city of Kolkata into two parts. There was a part of the British whose name was White Town. Zakaria Street was then part of Black Town. Zakaria Street was developed as a residential area in the past. In the nineteenth century, Haji Nur Muhammad Zakaria, a Muslim businessman from the Kutchi Memon community, lived on Armanitola Street. This street is named after him. Later, especially after the riots of 1910, some Muslim families left the area. In 1911, as part of the development work of Calcutta Improvement Trust on the street, it demolished several slums owned by some Muslims, leading to frequent inter-communal territorial fights between the prosperous Marwaris and working class Muslims of this area. Then several Marwari families started to dominate in this area. Frequent riots drove many Marwaris away from the street in the 1950s.

== Food street ==
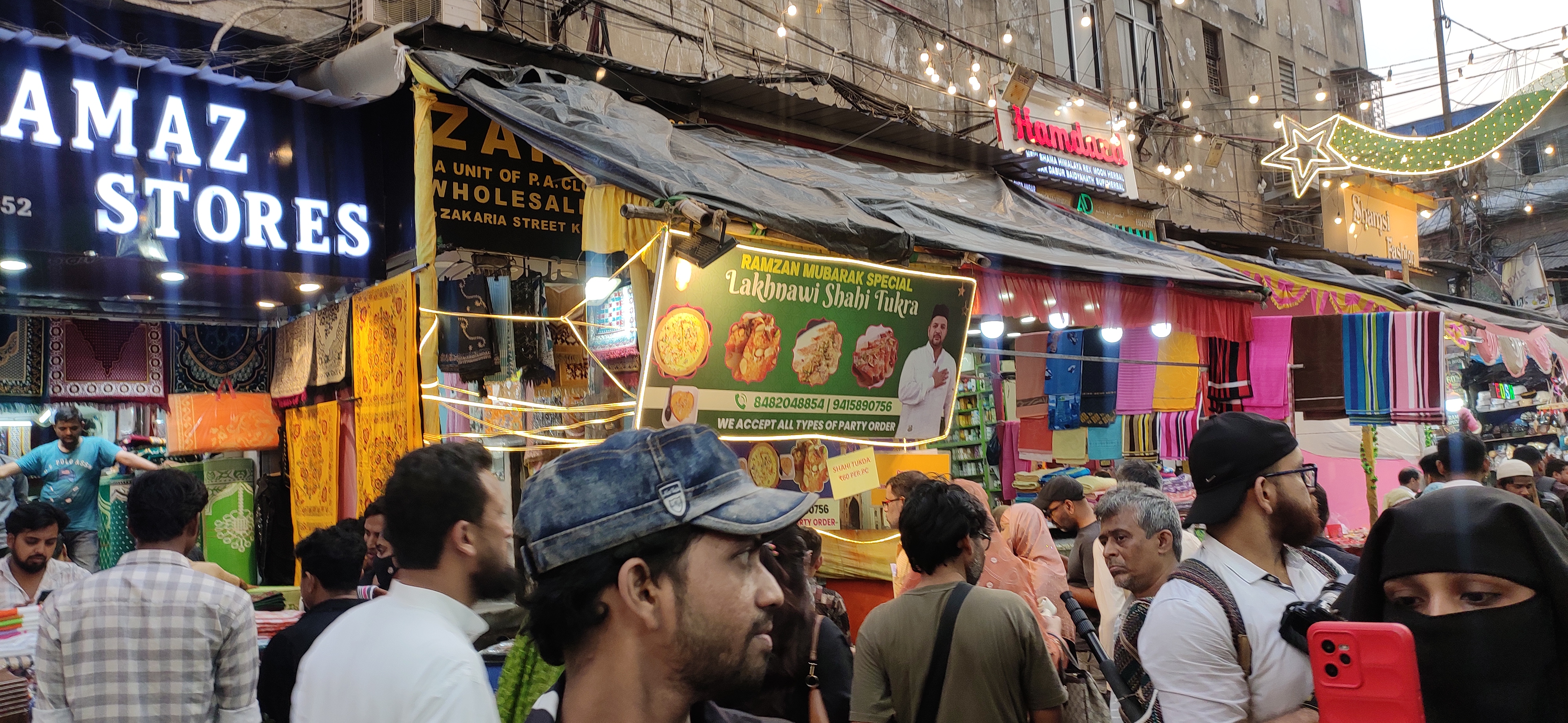
Restaurants at the street during Ramadan in 2026

There are about 100 temporary stalls on this street during the month of Ramadan. There are also at least thirty restaurants open throughout the year. A variety of food is sold in front of the Nakhoda Mosque on the street. This place is usually famous for sahri and iftar food during Ramadan season. A variety of kebabs are available on this street. Haleem is available at Sufia and Aminia Restaurant on Zakaria Street. Chicken Changeji, a North Indian dish, is sold on many more restaurants, including Dilli 6 on this street. Halwa and Lachcha Sewai are also available here. Royal India Hotel sells mutton chap and biryani here. This street is popular for Bakarkhani.

During Ramadan, the area around Zakaria Street becomes one of Kolkata's busiest evening destinations, attracting visitors from across the city who gather for iftar and late-night meals. The neighbourhood around the nearby Nakhoda Mosque fills with food stalls, shops selling religious items, and vendors offering traditional dishes influenced by Mughal and Awadhi cuisine. The atmosphere is particularly lively around sunset and before dawn, when people break their fast or eat the pre-fast meal, turning the street into a vibrant cultural space associated with Ramadan traditions in the city.

== See also ==
- Ramadan in India
