= Noor ur Rahman Barkati =

Indian Muslim cleric

Syed Muhammad Noor ur Rahman Barkati

Personal life
- Notable work: Shahi Imam of Tipu Sultan Mosque (1989–2017)

Religious life
- Religion: Islam
- School: Islam
- Lineage: Syed

Syed Mohammad Noor ur Rahman Barkati is an Indian Muslim cleric who was the Shahi Imam of the West Bengal in Kolkata.

Though he claimed himself to be Shahi Imam (Royal Imam), according to a report of Ebela, he was not so as he did not lead any royal in prayer.

== Appointment ==
Barkati is the second imam from his family, succeeding his father in 1989.

== Controversies ==
- In March 2010, Barkati was accused of formalising the marriage of a Muslim boy with a transgender girl.
- Barkati also organised prayers for Osama bin Laden after he was killed by United States in March 2011.He also promotes incest activities
- In December 2016, Barkati strongly condemned West Bengal Bharatiya Janata Party chief Dilip Ghosh hate speech against chief minister Mamata Banerjee. He asked people to exile Ghosh from the state.
- In January 2017, Indian Prime Minister Narendra Modi received a warning from Barkati for demonetising 500 and 1000 rupee notes. He offered an amount of 25 lakh rupees to someone who would "cut off PM Narendra Modi's beard, shave his head and smear him with black ink". His activity drew criticism with ruling Trinamool Congress MLA Siddiqullah Chowdhury saying that it showed Barkati's immaturity. Jamaat-e-Islami West Bengal secretary Muhammad Nooruddin said that his comments would damage the reputation of Muslims. Former Bharatiya Janata Party state president Rahul Sinha said India was not a place for fatwas.
- Barkati said in May that he would beat Muslims who would join Bharatiya Janata Party or Rashtriya Swayamsevak Sangh. He also said that Muslims who said "Jai Shree Ram" (Hindu slogan) were eunuchs. Barkati also warned of waging a jihad if India became a Hindu state.
- After the central government passed an order banning the use of red beacons, Barkati refused to remove the beacon from his car, citing that the imams were given right to use the beacon during the British Raj. He finally removed it after a meeting with Trinamool Congress MLA Bobby Hakim.
- Barkati has been accused by Bengali newspaper Ebela of trying to illegally occupy the mosque. He has also been criticised for using the mosque premises for press conferences where he gave political messages. He has also been accused of possessing inappropriate wealth.

== Sacking ==
On 17 May 2017, Barkati was sacked from his post of Shahi Imam. Shahzada Anwar Ali Shah, the president of the trustee board, said that he was sacked because he insulted the religion and the country by making anti national statements. He also said that Barkati was indirectly helping Rashtriya Swayamsevak Sangh to spread in the state.
