= Basri Shah Mosque =

Sunni mosque in Kolkata, India

- বশরী শাহ মসজিদ
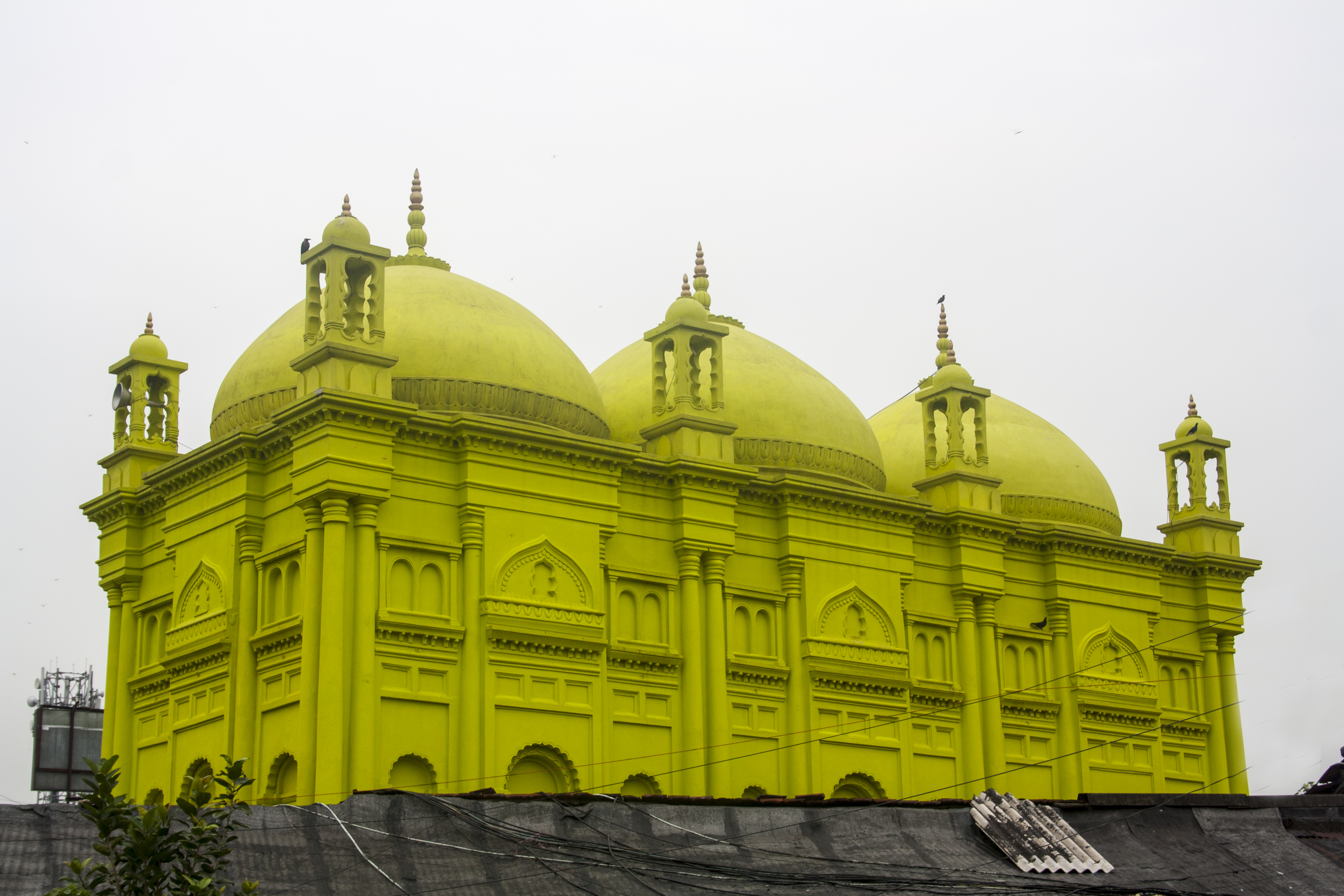
- The mosque, in 2015

- Location of the mosque in Kolkata

Religion
- Affiliation: Sunni Islam
- Sect: Hanafi school
- Ecclesiastical or organizational status: Mosque
- Governing body: Sunni Waqf Board
- Status: Active

Location
- Location: Kolkata, Kolkata District, West Bengal
- Country: India
- Interactive map of Basri Shah Mosque
- Coordinates: 22°36′30″N 88°22′11″E

Architecture
- Type: Mosque architecture
- Style: Islamic; Murshidabadi
- Founder: Jafir Ali
- Completed: 1219 AH (1804/1805 CE)

Specifications
- Direction of façade: West
- Dome: Three
- Minaret: Four
- Shrine: One (Basri Shah)

The Basri Shah Mosque is a Sunni mosque, located in the Chitpur-Cossipore area of Kolkata, in the state of West Bengal, India. Completed in 1219 AH (1804/1805 CE), it is the oldest mosque in Kolkata, and is situated at the junction of Panchanan Mukherjee Road and Sett Pukur Road. It is one of heritage sites listed by Kolkata Municipal Corporation. (Note: Basri Shah Mosque was recorded in the heritage list of Kolkata Municipal Corporation as "Bashiri Mosque".) The mosque has three domes and four minarets. The mosque is affiliated with the Hanafi school of worship.

== History ==
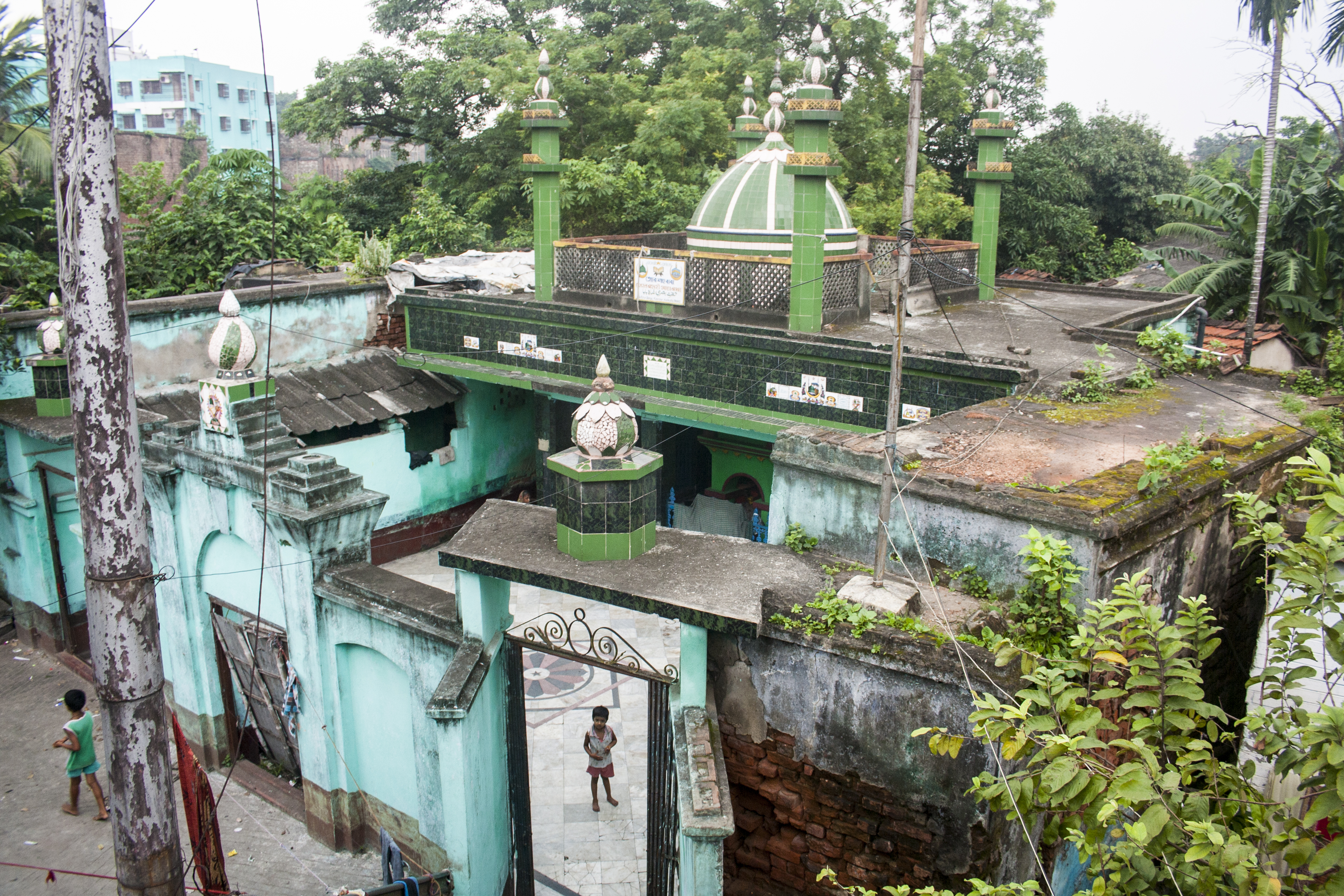
Shrine of Basri Shah

Before the establishment of Kolkata there was an old mosque in the place of present Basri Shah Mosque. The present mosque was built in 1219 AH (1804/1805 CE) by Jafir Ali. The mosque was named after the shrine of Basri Shah situated nearby. Basri was a saint who was from Basra in Iraq and settled in Kolkata sometimes between 1760 and 1790. After his death a shrine was made by his followers.

The mosque was abandoned for many years. The Kolkata Municipal Corporation added the mosque to its heritage list with renovation work.

== See also ==
- Islam in India
- List of mosques in India
- List of mosques in Kolkata
