= Futnani Chambers =

Heritage building in Calcutta, India

- ফুটনানি চেম্বার্স
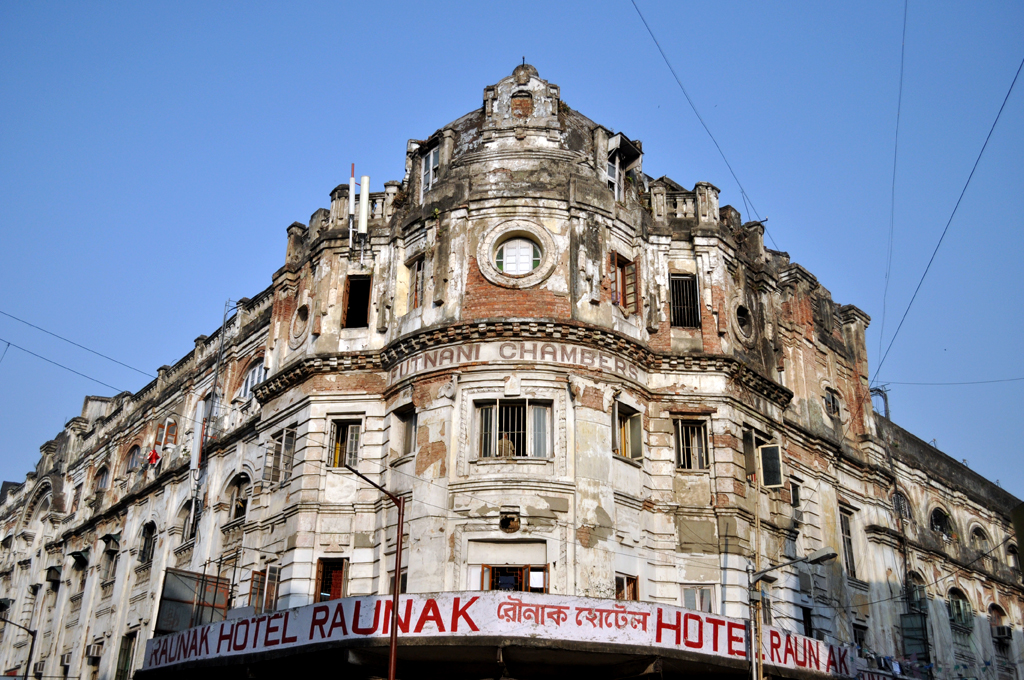
- The façade of the Futnani Chambers
- Interactive map of the Futnani Chambers area
- Former names: Hindustan Building

General information
- Type: Commercial building
- Architectural style: Colonial Neoclassical architecture
- Location: 6A, S.N. Banerjee Road, Esplanade, Calcutta, West Bengal, India
- Coordinates: 22°33′45″N 88°21′14″E
- Current tenants: 120 families and multiple commercial establishments
- Owner: Kolkata Municipal Corporation

Technical details
- Structural system: Load-bearing brick masonry

Futnani Chambers is a Grade I heritage building located on the Surendranath Banerjee Road in central Calcutta, West Bengal, India. Situated on over 100 cottahs, the building is known for its distinctive twin domes. It is a notable example of Calcutta's colonial-era architecture and accommodates around 120 tenants, besides numerous commercial establishments and offices.

Previously known as the Hindustan Building, the Calcutta Municipal Corporation leased the building to the Hindustan Insurance Company in 1910 for a period of 99 years. In 1956, it came under the ownership of the Life Insurance Corporation of India after the Hindustan Insurance Company was merged into it. Later, the building acquired its present name after it was subleased to the Futnani family.

== History ==
The three-storey building was originally a part of Rani Rashmoni's estates. In the late nineteenth century, the British-run Calcutta Municipal Corporation acquired this building from Rani Rashmoni's descendants. In 1910, the Calcutta Municipal Corporation leased the building to the Hindustan Insurance Company for a period of 99 years. After the change in ownership, the building came to be known as the Hindustan Building.

In 1956, along with all the other private insurance companies in India, Hindustan Insurance Company got merged with the Life Insurance Corporation of India (LIC). Life Insurance Corporation subleased the building to Murlimal Santram & Company, which was owned by the Futnanis. They renamed the building Futnani Chambers and rented its rooms to over 120 families.

The Futnanis were given a handover notice by the Kolkata Municipal Corporation in 2011, owing to the completion of their 99–year lease period. In response, the Futnanis moved to the Calcutta High Court, demanding an extension of their lease, citing a clause in the deed between them and the Life Insurance Corporation. After a nine-year legal battle, on 4 May 2018, the Kolkata Municipal Corporation acquired the ownership of the building after the Futnanis accepted that they were facing difficulties maintaining the edifice since the rent earned from the tenants was very meagre.

== Architecture and layout ==
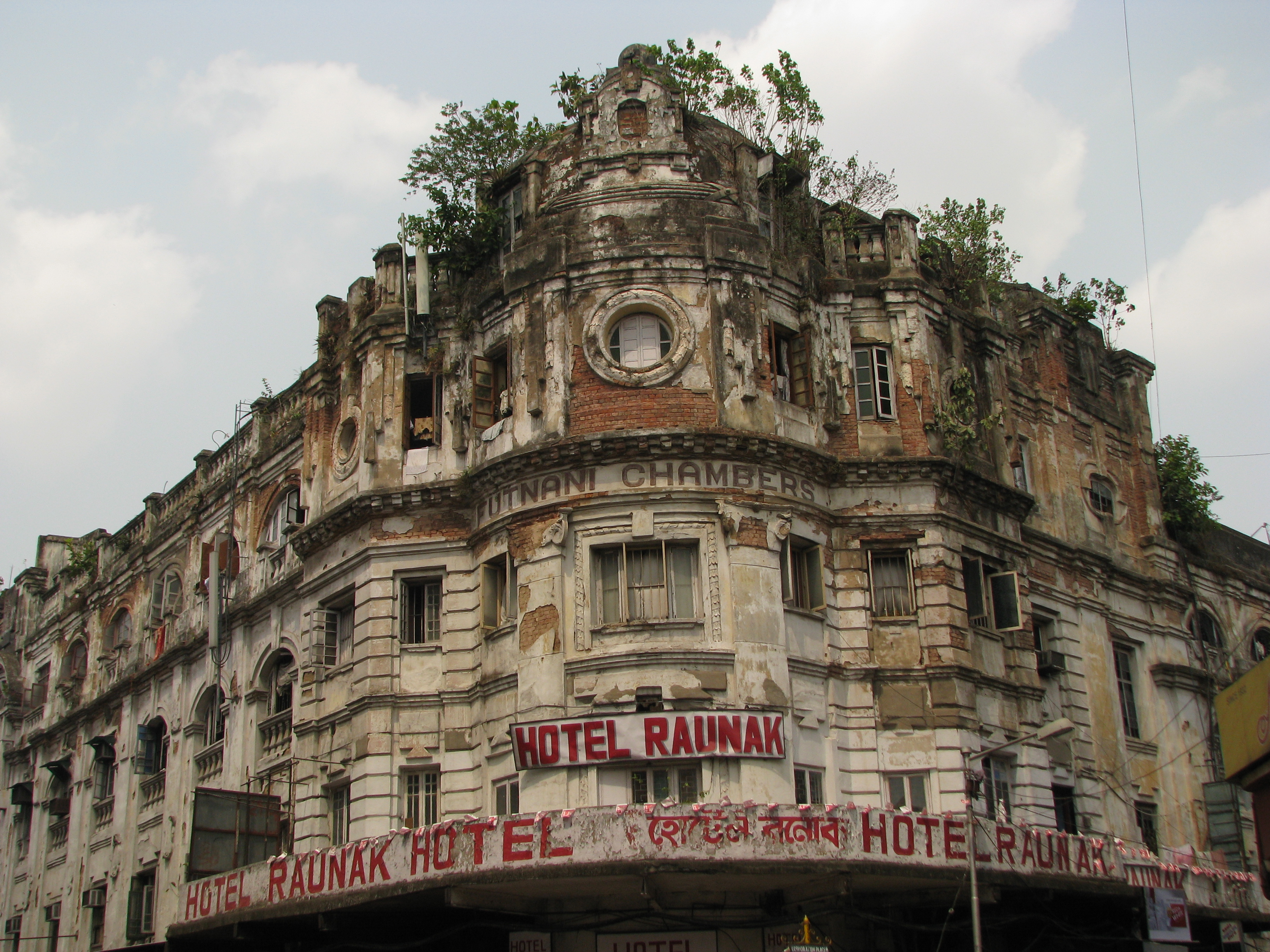
The Neoclassical architecture along with the oculus window at the façade of the Futnani Chambers

The building is best known for its twin corner domes, located atop the rounded corner sections of the façade. The façade is symmetrically arranged around the central portion, with the two domed corner sections balancing each other. The façade is horizontally divided by several moulded bands, which create a clear visual distinction between the lower and upper storeys. Circular oculus windows are present beneath the domes. The ground floor of the building features iron masonry accompanied by jaafri style of ornamentation. The ground floor has a series of arched openings forming an arcade, which benefitted the accommodation of multiple commercial establishments. There are nine gates overall. The upper floors are marked by pilasters and rows of arched windows. Projecting cornices and moulded window surrounds are present all around the exterior part. Much of the original stucco ornamentation has been dilapidated over time, exposing the underlying brick masonry in places.

An expert committee's preliminary assessment suggested that at least 25,000–30,000 square feet of additional floor area was constructed in the building beyond what its foundation was originally designed to support. As a result, the old structure has become fragile. Gokul Mandal of the Civil Engineering Department of Jadavpur University stated, "As a structure ages, its load-bearing capacity naturally decreases. Therefore, any additional construction requires extra caution. In the case of Futnani Chambers, the opposite occurred. The structure was expanded indiscriminately, placing an excessive load on the foundation." The total built-up area of Futnani Chambers is approximately 150,000 square feet, while the floor plate area is around 40,000 square feet. On that basis, the building should have had a total floor area of about 120,000 square feet across its existing number of storeys. Calculations indicate that there is nearly 30,000 square feet of excess construction beyond this figure.

== Commercial establishments ==
Futnani Chambers once housed the largest jazz club in the history of India — Golden Slippers — and the building was the centre of the nightlife of old Calcutta. The club was run by Dady Mazda, and it was famous for its classic jazz and rock 'n' roll music. During the British era and early post–independence period, particularly in the 1940s and 1950s, it was a vibrant nightclub, but its popularity declined after the 1970s. It was frequently visited by the British officials and other European residents during the British rule. For a brief period, the club was managed by Kumar Chunder Sen. Francis Braganza, Thomas Braganza, Joseph Braganza, Teddy Weatherford and Tony Menezes used to jam here during the 1940s.

Two other bars on the ground floor — the Delight Bar and the Paris Bar — were opened in the mid–1950s. Over time, owing to the decline of jazz and rock 'n' roll music, both of them converted into family restaurants during the 1990s.

The head office of Bata India is housed in this building.

Presently, the ground floor of the building is covered with multiple commercial establishments and offices, including the Aminia. This branch of the restaurant was inaugurated on 15 August 1947. Over the years, it has expanded to multiple locations, but this became and remains their most visited outlet. The head office of Bata India is also housed in this building.

There are more than a dozen hotels on the building premises. The most notable one among them is Hotel Raunak. It was very popular during the colonial period and post–independence era but gradually declined after the 1970s. The courtyard of the building has also been covered with multiple single-room shops, kitchens of various major restaurants in the nearby Janbazar locality, and sitting areas of various street food centres located on the adjoining footpath.

== Notable residents ==
Among the building's most notable residents were the longest serving Chief Minister of West Bengal — Jyoti Basu, his siblings and their parents Nishikanta Basu and Hemlata Basu. The Basu couple rented a room here in 1917 and stayed for 3 years along with their children. While residing here, Jyoti Basu used to study at the Loreto School Kindergarten in Dharmatala. Another one of the notable residents of the building was Rabindra Sangeet exponent Debabrata Biswas, a.k.a. George Da.

Suite No. 12 of the building was rented for the meetings, proceedings and display sessions of the Indian Society of Oriental Art from the 1900s to the 1960s. Founded by British art historian Ernest Binfield Havell and painter-writer Abanindranath Tagore, it used to promote modern Indian art, particularly from the Bengal School of Art.

== Decline and structural instability ==
Years of ignominy and neglect have rendered Futnani Chambers dilapidated. Despite becoming municipal property in 2018, neither the state government nor the Kolkata Municipal Corporation undertook any repair work. In 2013, a large chunk of concrete fell from one of the balconies of the building. No injuries were reported since the accident took place at midnight. Kolkata Municipal Corporation officials demolished that balcony entirely to avoid any future mishaps. When questioned about the negligence towards repairing the building, KMC officials said that the repair works were being delayed due to the lack of sufficient funds.

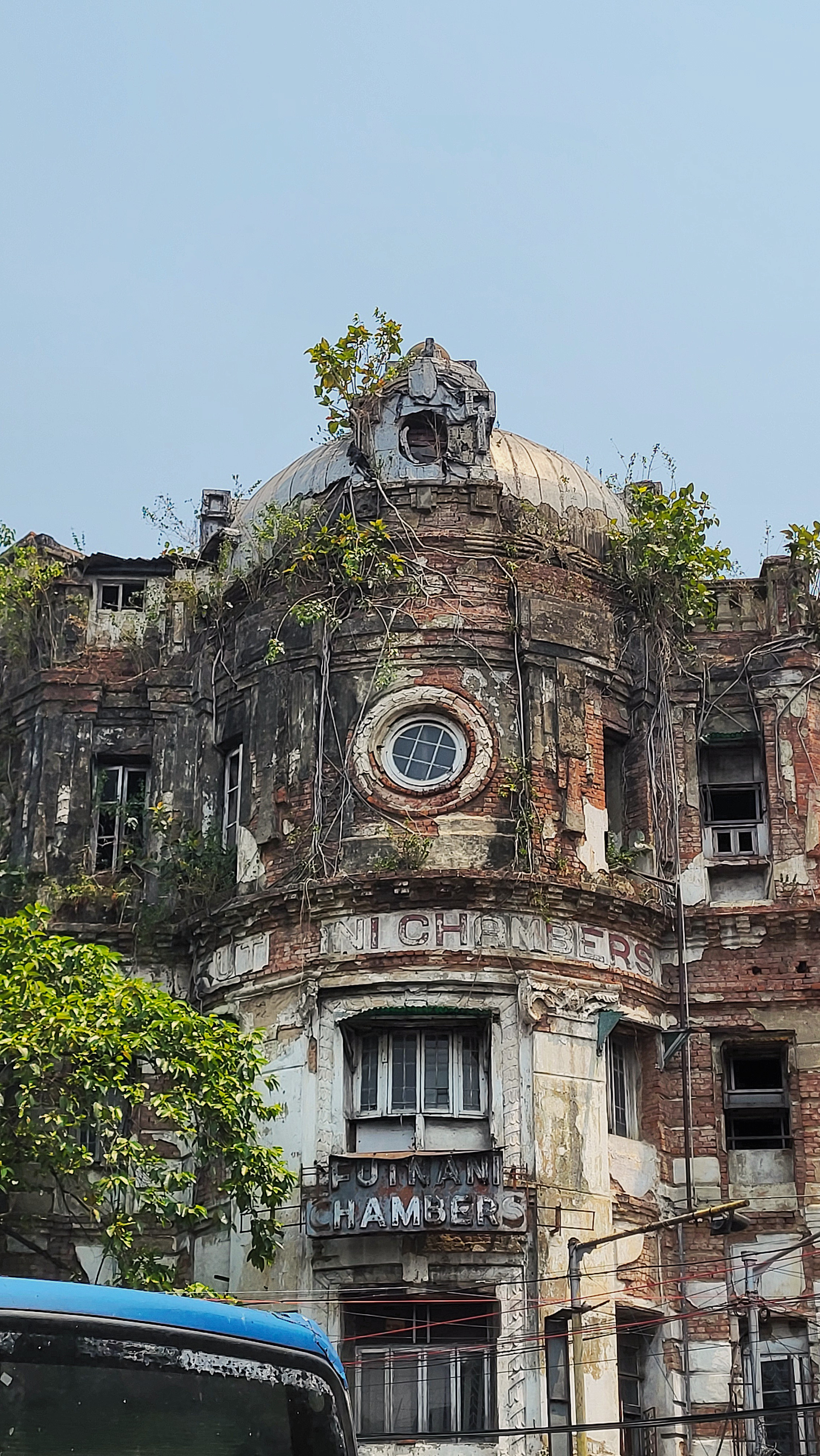
The ramshackled corner dome and oculus windows of the building

The Kolkata Municipal Corporation handed over the responsibility for studying the structural integrity of the building to a team of engineers from Jadavpur University. After the survey, they suggested that the building should either be repaired properly or be demolished as soon as possible, in order to collapsing at any time. In 2014, the market department of the Kolkata Municipal Corporation had sent notices to the tenants, urging them to repair the building after consulting a structural engineer. Although few showed interest, most of the residents didn't respond.

In May 2020, the Kolkata Municipal Corporation asked the shops and businesses on the ground floor of Futnani Chambers to shift somewhere else. The condition of the building has deteriorated beyond repairs, and it might collapse at any moment, risking the lives of multiple tenants as well as the pedestrians passing by. However, when the businesses did not relocate, the Kolkata Municipal Corporation served them an official notice in July 2020. An official from the KMC stated that the shops occupied premises leased by the Futnani family, but the Futnanis' lease agreement had expired in 2011. Consequently, their continued occupation of the building was deemed illegal. The official added that if the occupants did not vacate the premises despite receiving notices, the corporation would take further action as permitted by law.

== East–West Metro tunnelling ==
=== Preparatory works and safety measures ===
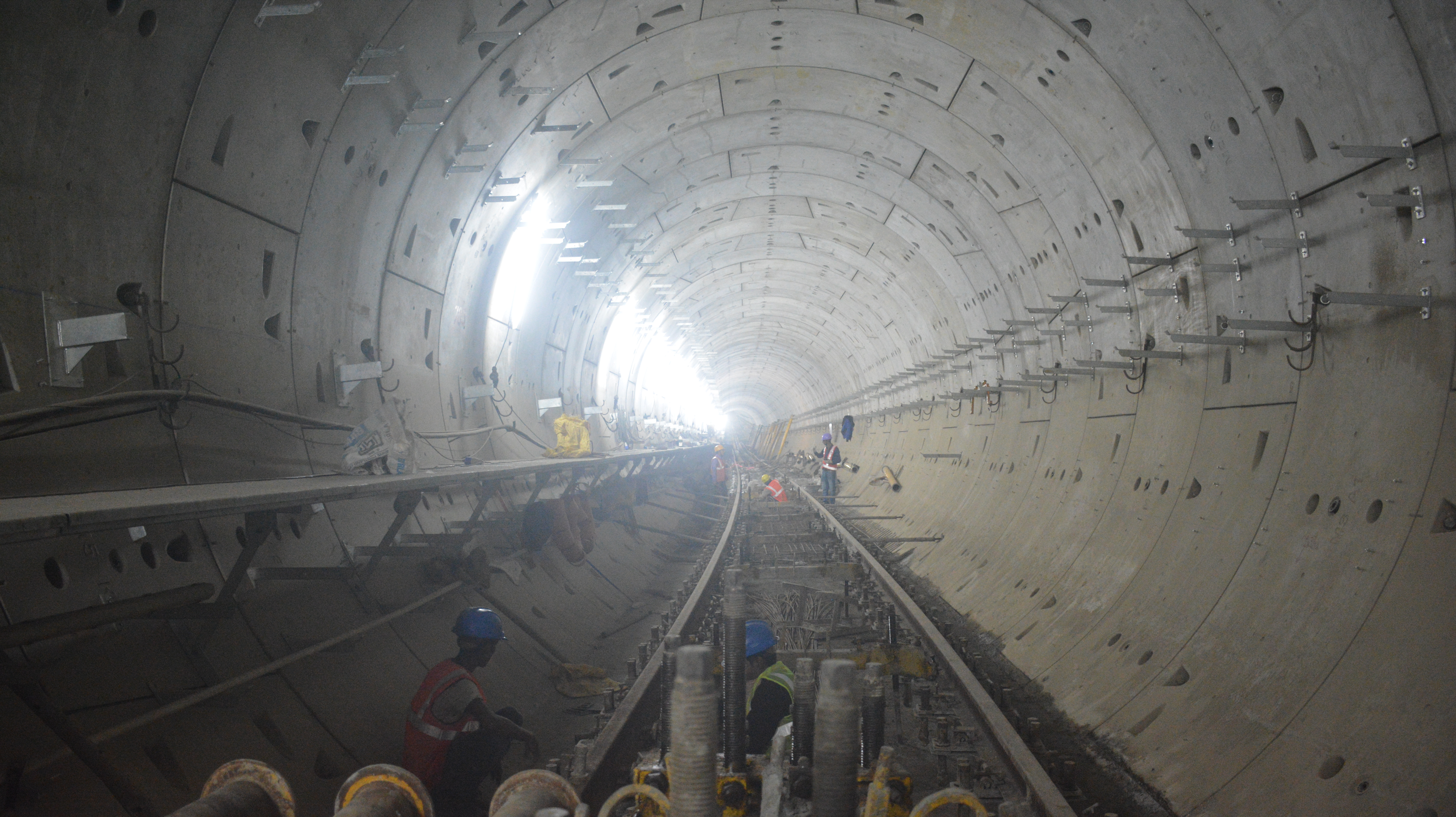
The East–West Metro tunnel passing beneath the Futnani Chambers

For constructing the East–West Metro corridor between Howrah Maidan and Sector V, the Tunnel Boring Machine "Chandi" was set to run below the northern wing of the building. While the officials of the Kolkata Metro Rail Corporation were conducting a Building Condition Survey (BCS) on the Futnani Chambers in late 2018, the surveyors couldn't climb beyond the first floor, owing to the hanging concrete chunks from the staircase. An official of the Kolkata Municipal Corporation mentioned that there were several other weaker structures along the route of the tunnel boring machine. But the lack of maintenance for such an edifice and the large number of people residing there led Futnani Chambers to the top of KMRC's list of 86 "unsafe" buildings between Wellington Square and SN Banerjee Road.

To prevent any concrete chunks from falling on the ground during the boring work, the building was covered with green nets. Steel props were fitted on the ground floor in order to support the walls and ceilings. Tiltmeters were placed at various corners to detect any sort of displacement. Heavy grouting was done on the ground floor — a mixture of sand and cement with water was coated over the concrete base. Temporary repair and scaffolding of the cracks were also done. Seven other such buildings between the Futnani Chambers and the Regal Cinema were also repaired.

Before the boring work began, an ITD-ITD Cem official made a list of people who were to be evacuated during the boring period. Only the residents of the Futnani Chambers were provided accommodation at a hotel from the government. The shops and offices on the ground floor were ordered to stay closed during this period. The residents were moved out a week before the starting of the boring work and were provided a stay at a hotel on Chittaranjan Avenue. Some residents owned pets that had to be left under the care of the Metro authorities.

=== Structural damage and aftermath ===
On 20 August 2019, owing to the vibrations generated from the tunnel-boring operations for the East–West Metro in Calcutta, the corner dome on the building's roof collapsed and a part of the adjoining terrace caved in. Since the beginning of the boring work in its adjacent areas, multiple cracks had appeared at different places in the building.

Cracks have appeared in every step of the marble staircase beside the statue of Thomas J. Bata that leads from the ground to the first floor. The cracks widened over the next few months. KMC formed a special team consisting of civil, structural, and building engineers to repair the fallen roof. But the team stated that reconstructing the roof of the lime-mortar building would not be possible. So, they covered the damaged portion on the roof of the edifice with a fibre sheet, to urgently stop the water percolation.

Officials of the KMC stated that there would be an investigation into why the building suffered damage, despite getting a green certificate for tunnel boring below it from the Kolkata Metro Rail Corporation, after their officials had inspected this place. Countering the allegation, an official from the KMRC said that the damage incurred by the building was due to its structural weakness and it had nothing to do with the tunnel boring machine.

== Nearby historical landmarks ==
Esplanade has a rich history of colonial–era and post–independence landmarks. Historical landmarks in and around Futnani Chambers include the Sir Stuart Hogg Market, Writers' Building, Lok Bhavan, St. John's Church and General Post Office.
