= Rabindra Sarani =

Street in Kolkata, India

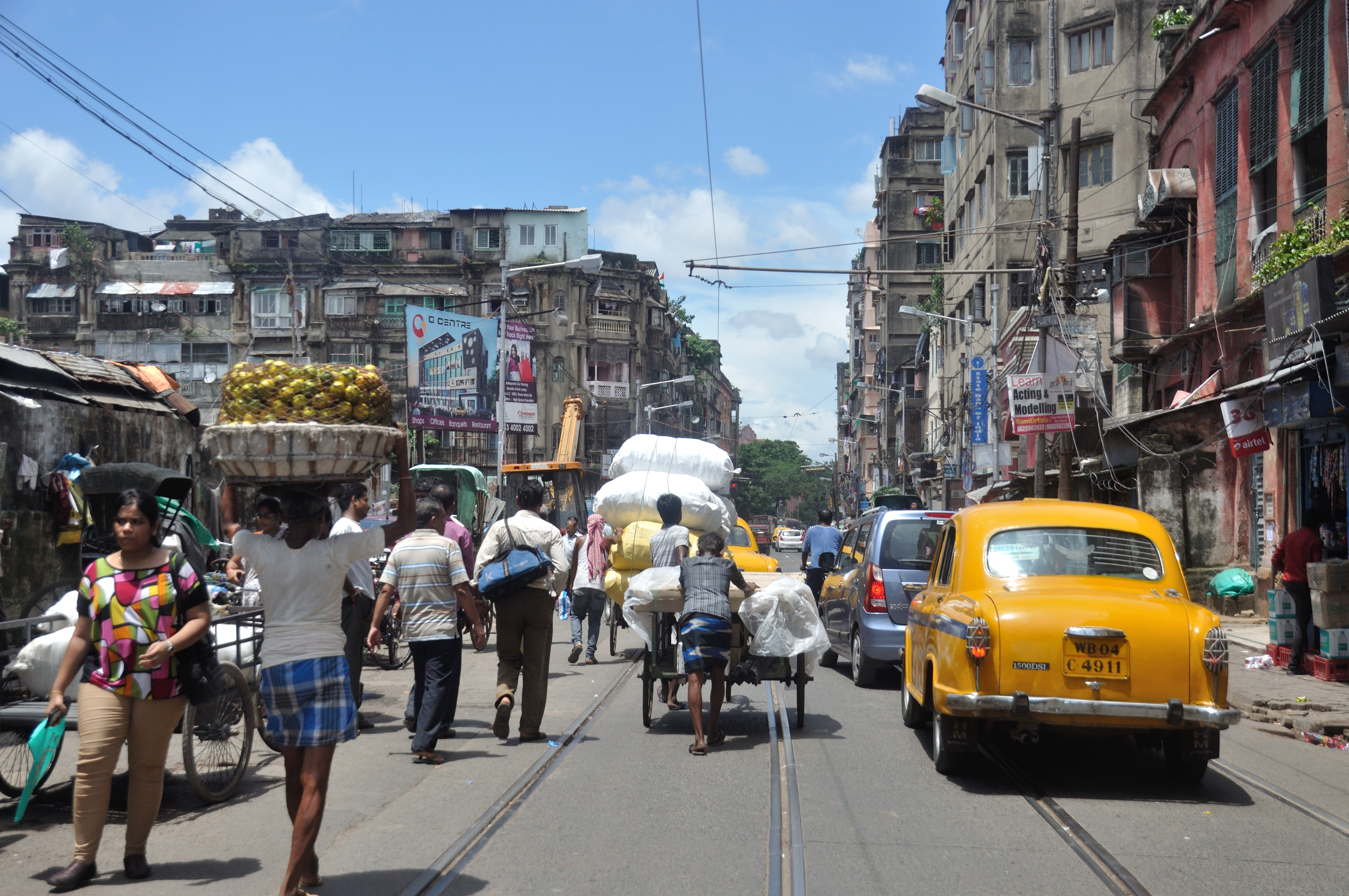
- Rabindra Sarani in 2015
- Interactive map of Rabindra Sarani
- Former name: Chitpur Road
- Namesake: Rabindranath Tagore
- Type: Street
- Maintained by: Kolkata Municipal Corporation
- Location: Kolkata, West Bengal, India
- Postal code: 734006
- Nearest Kolkata Tram station: Bagbazar
- Coordinates: 22.5902742°N 88.3594132°E
- Major junctions: Shobhabazar Hatkhola Crossing; B. K. Pal; Nimtala; Jorasanko; Chitpur Crossing; Poddar Court
- North: Galiff Street
- South: Bepin Behari Ganguly Street

Other
- Known for: Kolkata's oldest street
- Status: Active

Rabindra Sarani, earlier known as Chitpur Road, is a street located in the Indian metropolitan city of Kolkata. In the past, it formed part of the larger Pilgrim path used by devotees traveling to Kalighat. After the independence of India, a portion of it was renamed in honor of Rabindranath Tagore, the country's national poet. The street predates the metropolis it now runs through.

The street is home to several historic buildings and landmarks. During the Siege of Calcutta, the Nawab of Bengal, Siraj ud-Daulah, entered Kolkata through this street. Raja Ram Mohan Roy founded the Brahmo Sabha here, and the city's earliest stage drama was performed at the Clock House located along this road, where the Calcutta National Theatrical Society staged Nil Darpan. Tagore’s birthplace Jorasanko Thakur Bari, and the Nakhoda Mosque, built in the style of Akbar's tomb, are situated near this road.

== Location ==
To the south, at the junction of Bepin Behari Ganguly Street and Bentinck Street, stands the Mercantile Building, located near Lalbazar. The street proceeds northward, crossing Mahatma Gandhi Road, and ends before the Bagbazar Canal.

== History ==
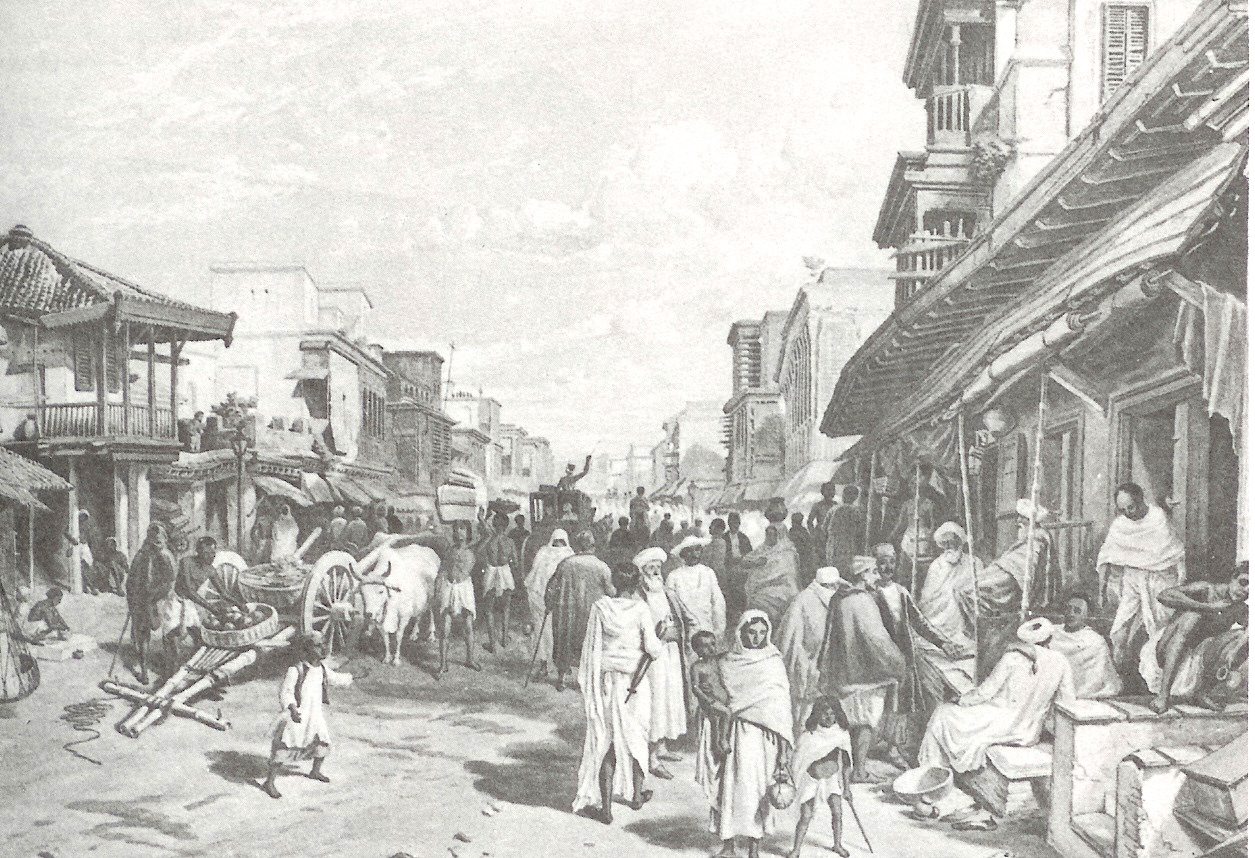
Chitpur Road in 1867, as sketched by William Simpson

In maps of the British East India Company, the road from Halisahar to the jungles of Chowringhee in the Bengal Presidency was referred to as the "Pilgrim path", as devotees used this route to reach Kalighat. The road served as the lifeline of the newly established city of Calcutta under the Company. In 1756, during the Siege of Calcutta, the Nawab of Bengal, Siraj ud-Daulah, entered the city through this route. Around 1792, a map prepared by Upjohn referred to it as the "Road to Chitpur". The road was later divided into two sections: Upper and Lower Chitpur Road. The southern portion of the road was later separated and renamed Bentinck Street. After the independence of India in 1947, a portion of the road was renamed to the present name in honor of the country's national poet, Rabindranath Tagore.

== Heritage and legacy ==
The street and its surrounding areas contain several historic landmarks. At the entrance to Nandarama Sen Street on the left side of the street stands the Atchala Temple, whose architectural style dates back to the eighteenth century. To the west of the street is Govindaram’s Temple. In 1828, Raja Ram Mohan Roy founded the Brahmo Sabha here, which later evolved into the Adi Brahmo Samaj, a hindu religious sect. At house number 279, known as the Clock House, the Calcutta National Theatrical Society initiated stage drama in Kolkata, and in 1872, Bengali play Nil Darpan was performed there. The Nakhoda Mosque, built in the style of Akbar's tomb, and Jorasanko Thakur Bari, the birthplace of Rabindranath Tagore, are located near this street. In fact, it predates the city of Kolkata itself.
