= List of mosques in Kolkata =

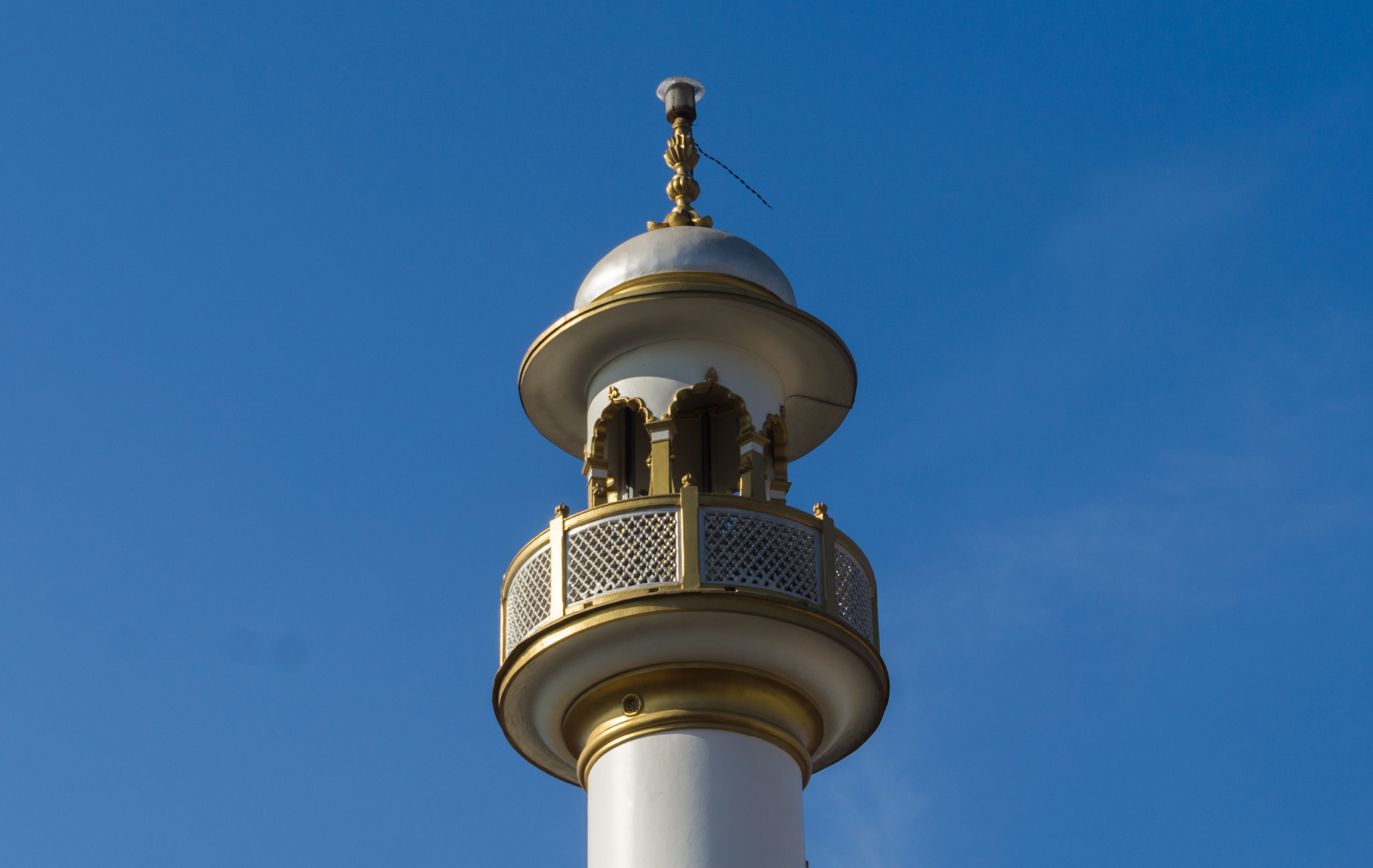
Minaret of Nakhoda Mosque

Mosques in Kolkata refers to mosques in the city of Kolkata, India. Kolkata is the capital city of West Bengal, a state in the eastern part of India. The city is more than 300 years old (as Kolkata) and was the capital of British India till early 1911. Kolkata hosts many churches, temples and mosques, along with other religious places. Muslims have been settling in Calcutta since the early 19th century, but the pace was accelerated from the 1860s onwards, mainly due to the harsh economic conditions in Bihar and the United Provinces of Agra and Oudh.

== List ==
There are nearly 450 mosques (known as masjid in Urdu and Bengali) in Kolkata (from Ward 1 to Ward 141). Density is highest in the wards in the central part of the city, where the density of the Muslim population is higher.

- Basri Shah Mosque. Built in 1804, it is the oldest mosque of Kolkata.
- Nakhoda Mosque and Rabindra Sarani crossing near Burrabazar, which was built in 1926.
- Tipu Sultan Mosque
- Rajabazar Barri Masjid
- Colootolla Chhoti Masjid
- Ahl-e-Hadees Masjid
- Habib-ul-Masaajid
- Masjid-e-Mohammadi
- Jumma Masjid
- Lal Masjid
- Karbala Masjid in Metiabruz, which is Shia in orientation, while the rest all follow the Sunni faith.
- Two Haqqani Masjid of Haqqani Anjuman(established by Murshid Maulana Sufi Mufti Azangachhi Shaheb)
- Ahmadiyya Masjid
- Gulam Rasool Masjid. Foundation laid in around 1932, and completed by 1940. Located in Park Circus, Kolkata.

Like all growing cities, space is a problem in Kolkata. To accommodate the growing population, most of the mosques are expanding vertically. The structures are also getting changed from old style to new style, and the way of construction is changing.

In 1942, the last mosque was built in Kolkata (in Entally).
