= Nakhoda Mosque =

Mosque in Kolkata, India

- নাখোদা মসজিদ
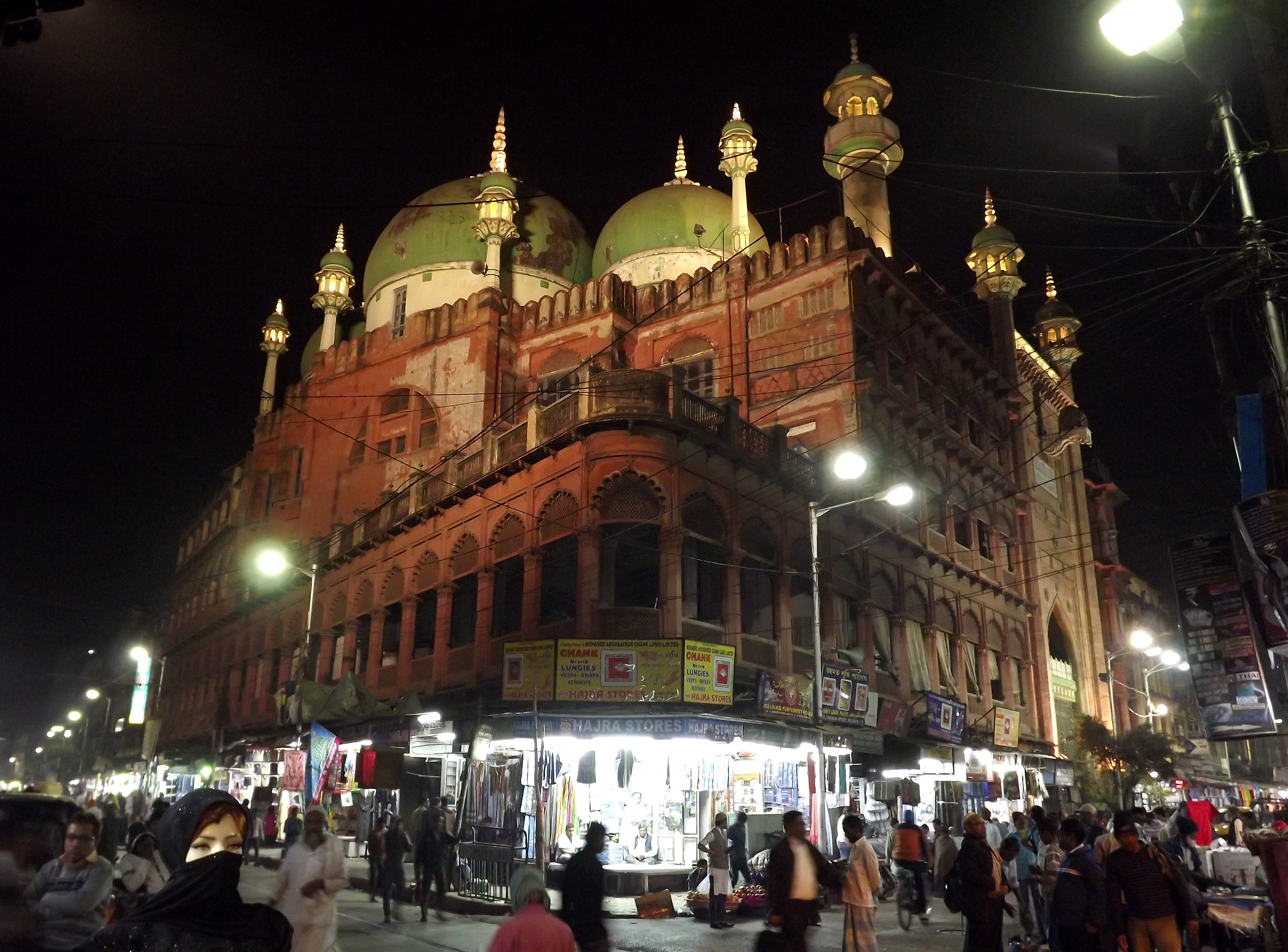
- The mosque at night, in 2014

- Location of the mosque in Kolkata

Religion
- Affiliation: Sunni Islam
- Sect: Hanafi school
- Ecclesiastical or organisational status: Mosque
- Status: Active

Location
- Location: Kolkata, West Bengal
- Country: India
- Coordinates: 22°34′35″N 88°21′21″E

Architecture
- Architect: Cutchi Memon Jamat
- Type: Mosque architecture
- Style: Mughal; Indo-Islamic
- Founder: Nawab Siraj ud-Daulah
- Completed: 1926; 100 years ago
- Construction cost: ₹1,500,000

Specifications
- Direction of façade: West
- Capacity: 10,000 worshipers
- Dome: Three
- Minaret: 27
- Minaret height: 46 m (151 ft) (highest)

Website
- nakhodamasjid.com

The Nakhoda Masjid is a Sunni mosque, located in Kolkata, in the state of West Bengal, India. The mosque is situated in the Chitpur area of the Burrabazar business district in Central Kolkata, at the intersection of Zakaria Street and Rabindra Sarani. Completed in 1926, it is the principal mosque for Kolkata and it is affiliated with the Hanafi school.

== Architecture ==
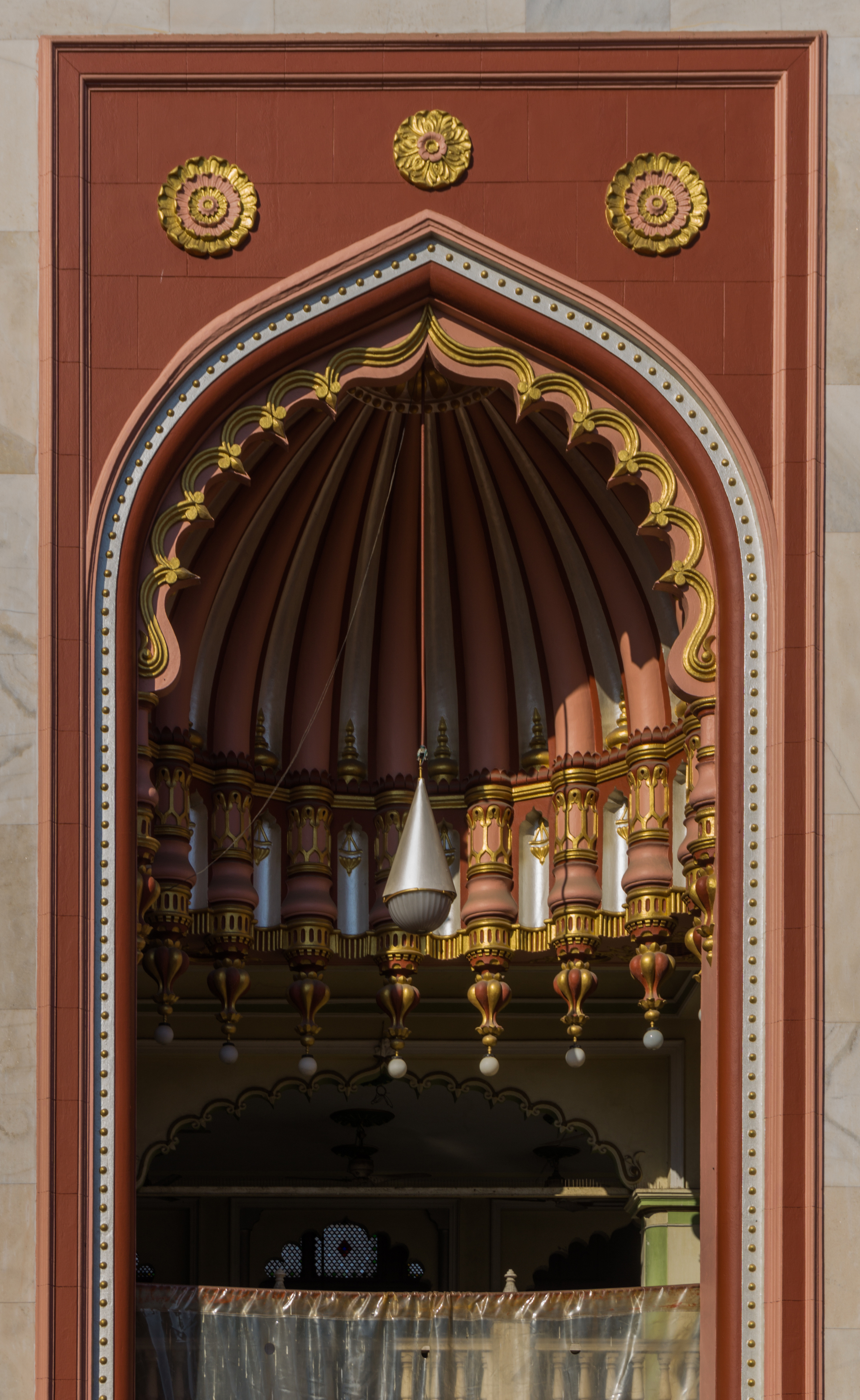
Entrance, resembling Buland Darwaza

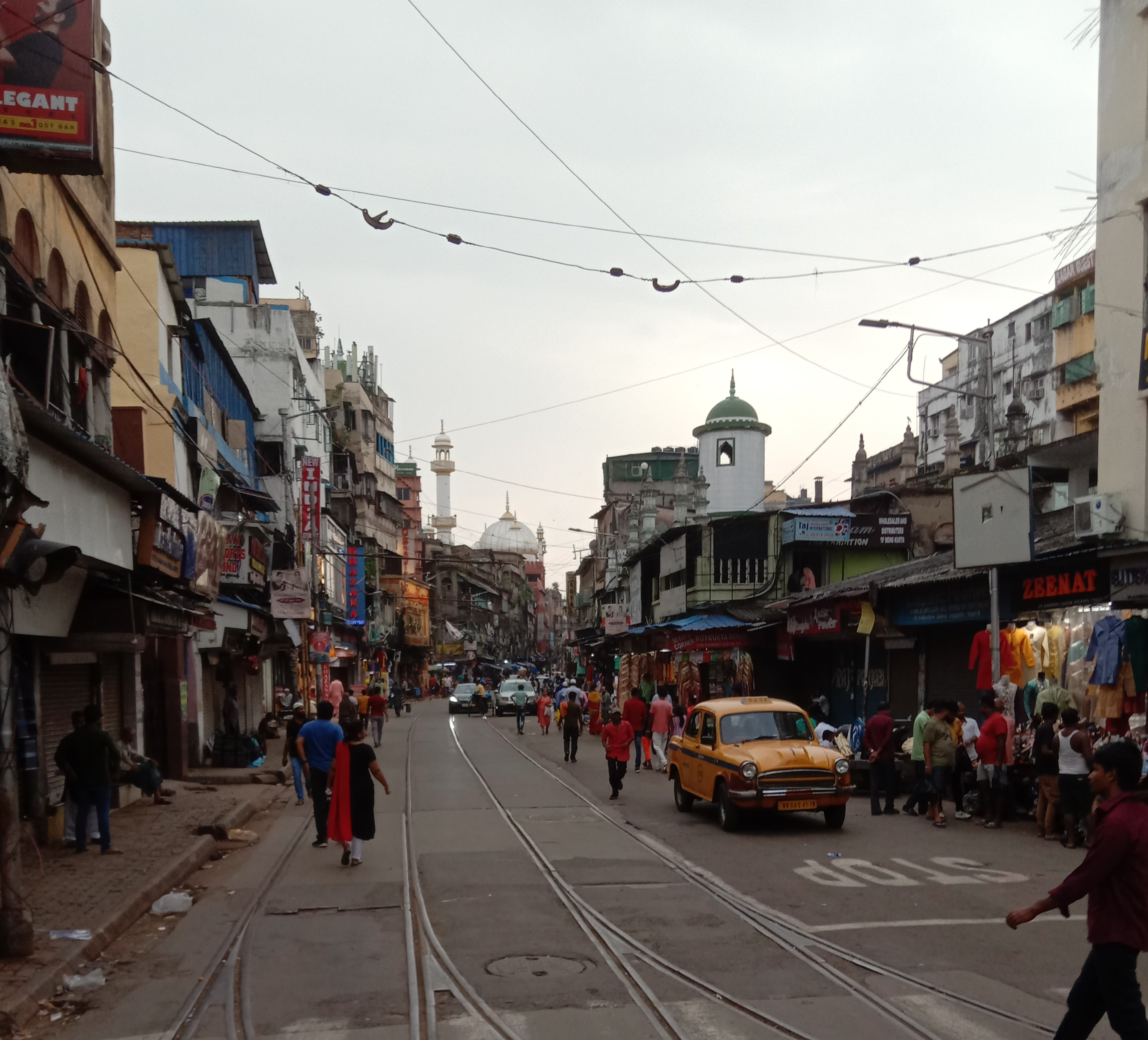
Nakhoda Mosque domes and minarets as seen from Mahatma Gandhi Road

The mosque was built as an imitation of the mausoleum of Mughal emperor Akbar at Sikandra, Agra by Kutchi Memon Jamat, a small Sunni community from Kutch.

With a capacity of 10,000 worshippers in the mosque's prayer hall, the Nakhoda Mosque is the largest mosque in West Bengal and eastern India. Before 1854 there used to be two different mosques at the present site. The mosque was named Nakhoda meaning mariner.

Reconstruction work started in 1926 and was completed in 1935. All the prominent Cutchi memons of Calcutta contributed for the new mosque, and Abdul Rahim Osman was the biggest donor. The total cost incurred for the construction was 1,500,000 Indian rupees in 1926. The contract for rebuilding the musjid was given to Mackintosh Burn & Co., a British engineering company.

The mosque has three domes and two minarets which are 46 metres (151 ft) high. There are an additional 25 smaller minarets which range from 30 to 36 metres (100 to 117 ft) high.

The gateway is an ersatz of the Buland Darwaza at Fatehpur Sikri. For this purpose granite stones were brought from Tolepur.

== Gallery ==
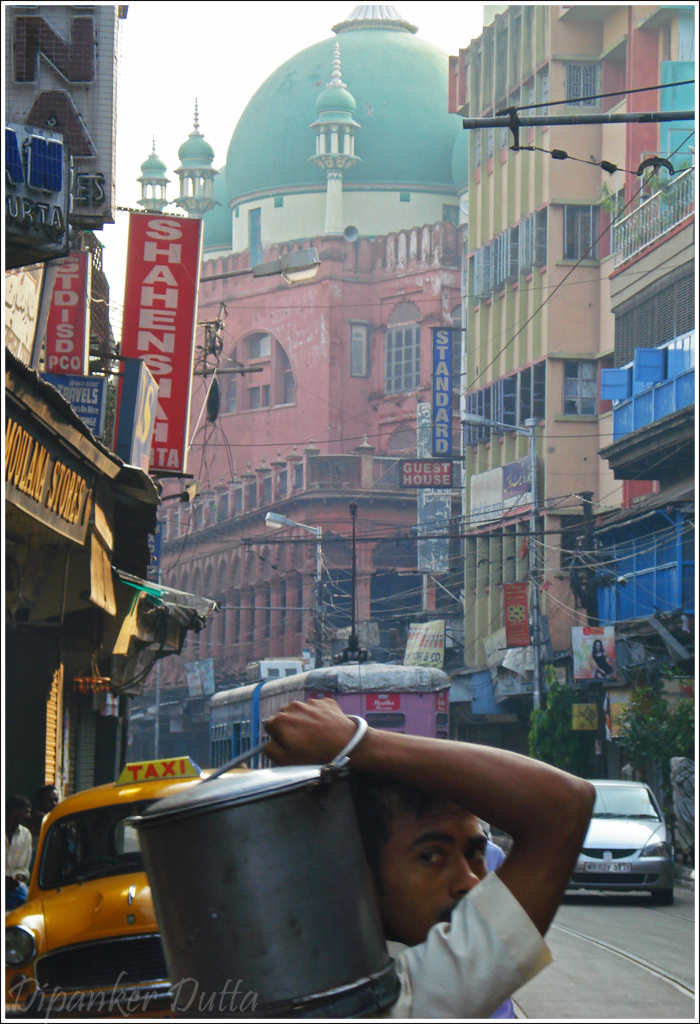
Distance view

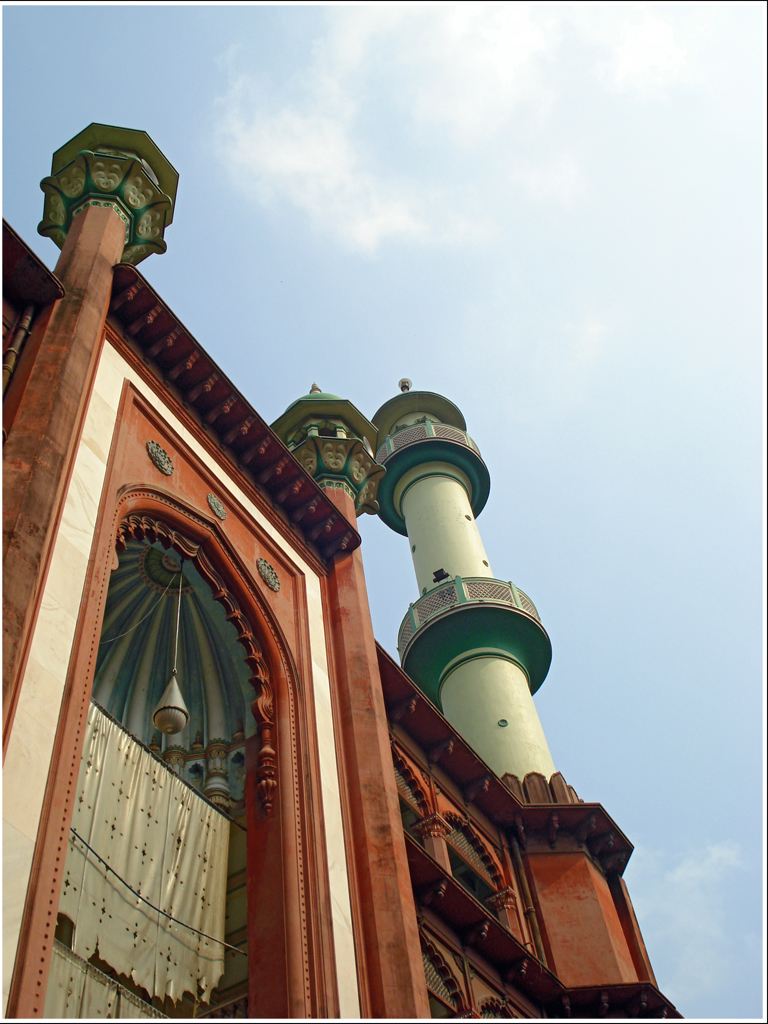
Closeup view of the entrance

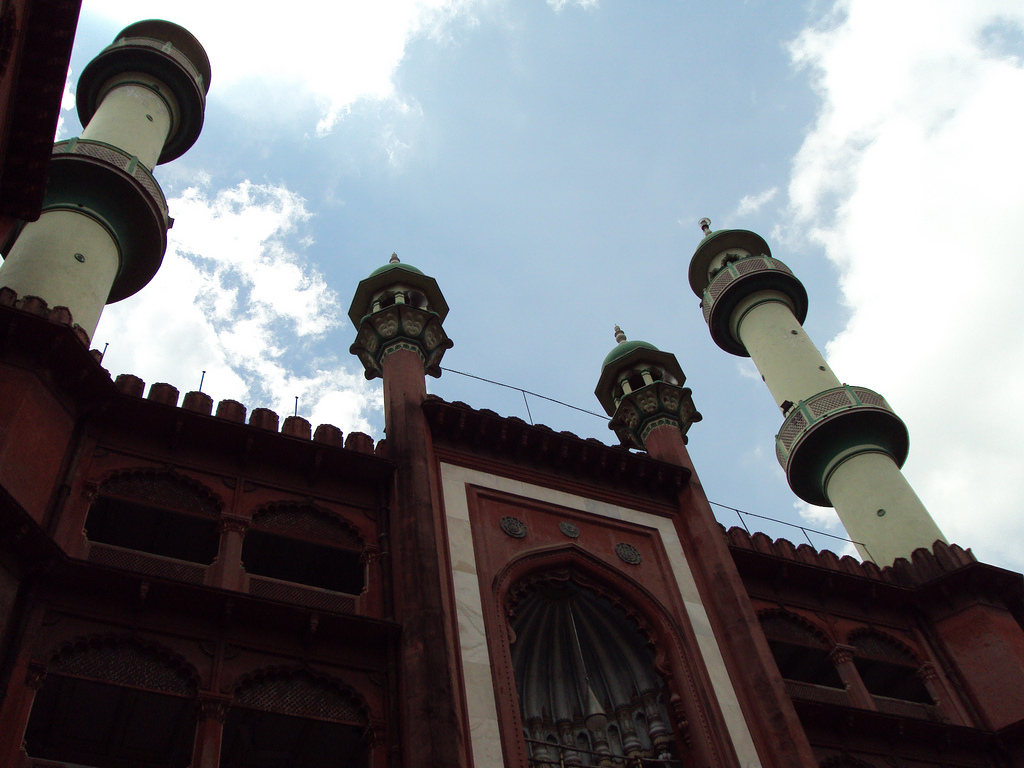
Another view

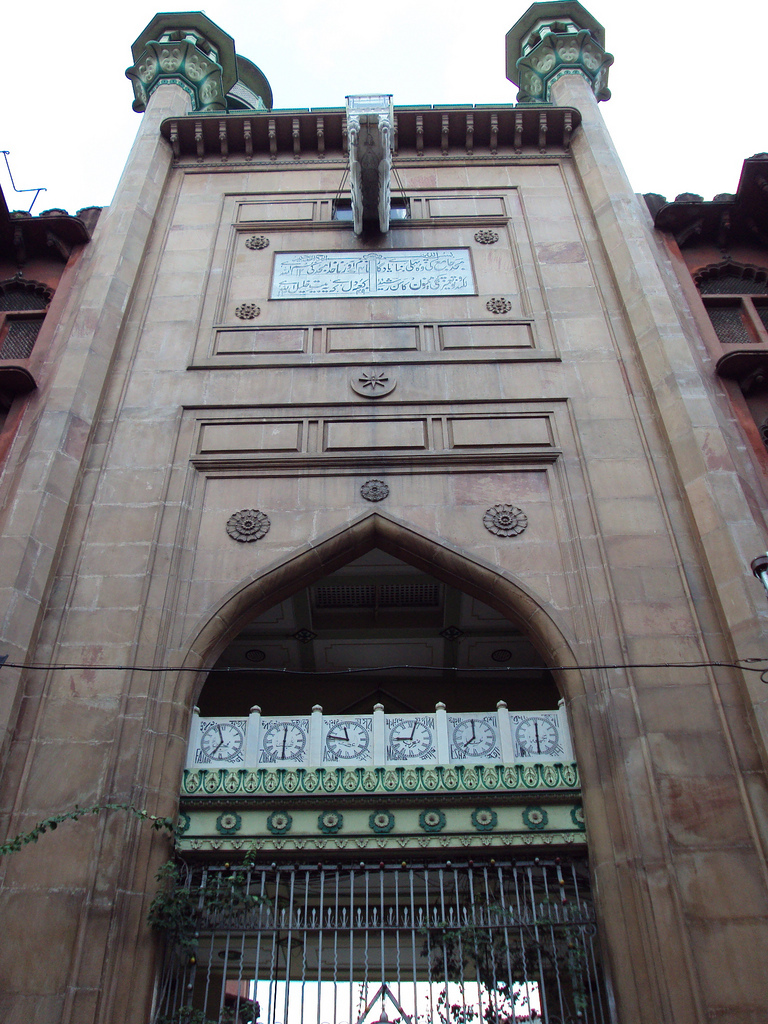
Side entrance

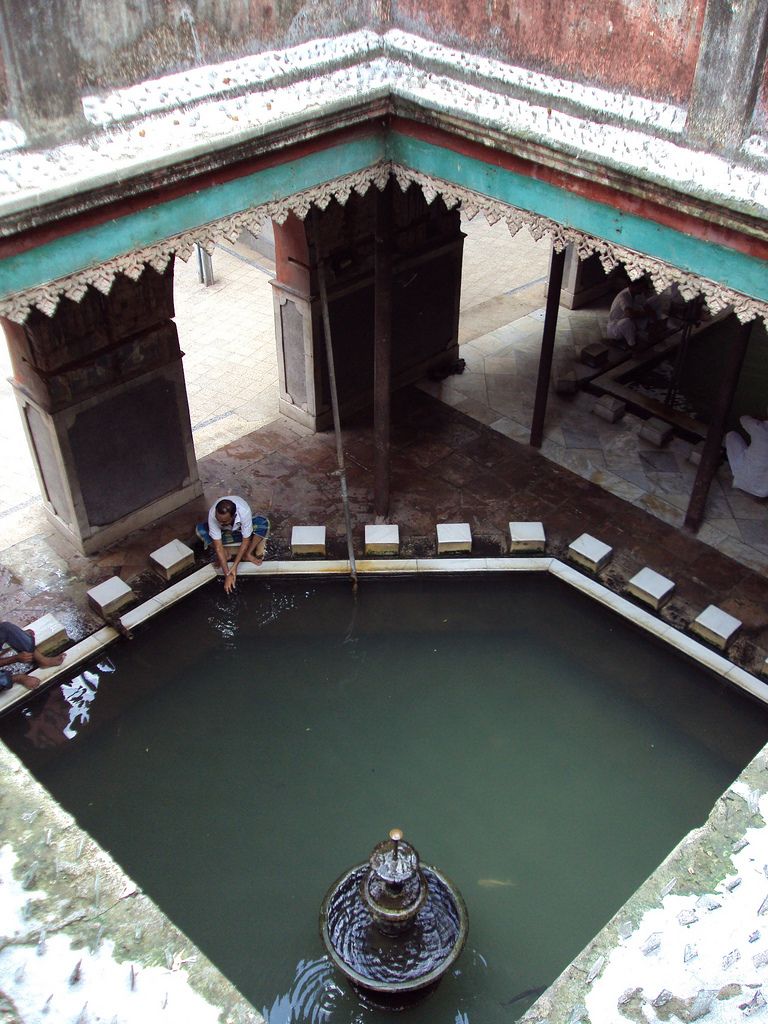
Ablution pool

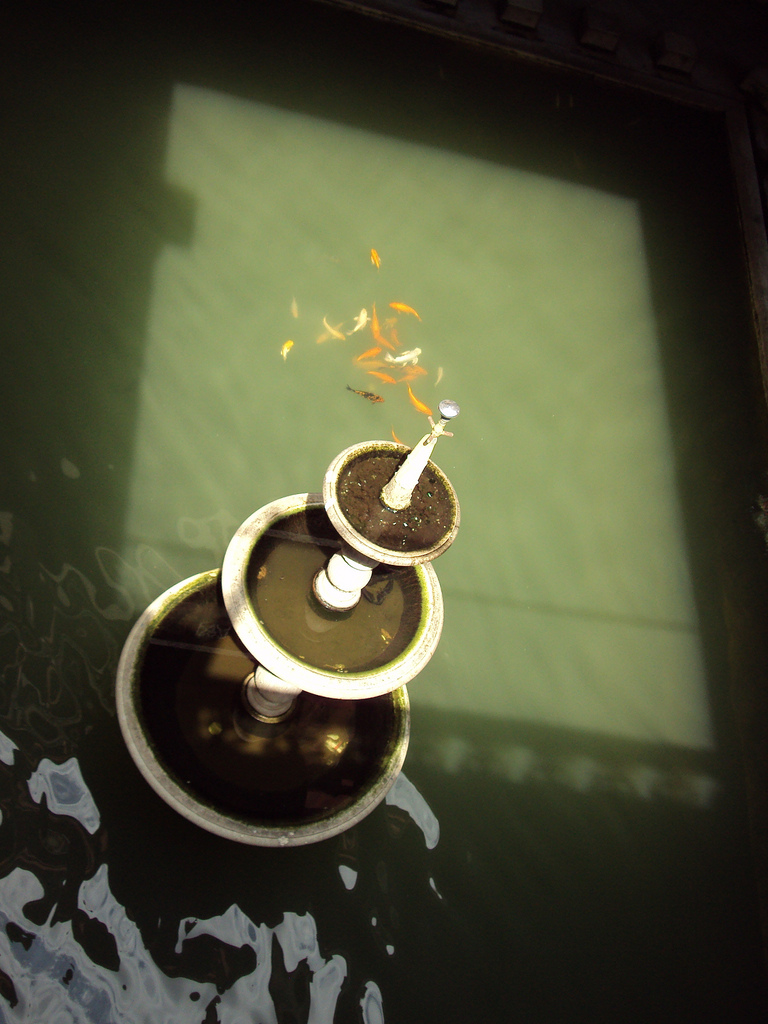
Ablution pool

== See also ==
- Islam in India
- List of mosques in India
- List of mosques in Kolkata
