= Ghulam Muhammad Sultan Sahib =

Youngest son of Tipu Sultan (1795–1872)

Ghulam Muhammad Sultan
- KCSI; Sayyid Shareef; Sahibzada of Mysore

Head of the Hydar Ali dynasty
- Reign: c. 1806 – 11 August 1872
- Predecessor: Tipu Sultan
- Born: March 1795; Srirangapatnam
- Died: 11 August 1872 (aged 77); Tollygunge, Calcutta
Names
- Sahibzada Sayyid Shareef Ghulam Muhammad Sultan Khan Sahib
- Father: Tipu Sultan

Prince Sahibzada Sayyid Shareef Ghulam Muhammad Sultan Khan Sahib, KCSI (March 1795; Srirangapatnam – 11 August 1872; Tollygunge, Calcutta) was the youngest son of Tipu Sultan.

Deported to Calcutta in 1806 along with the remainder of his family 7 years after the defeat and death of his father, he was eventually recognised by the Government of India as the official head of the family and successor to his father.

Known as the last surviving son of Tipu Sultan and Knighted in 1870, he died 2 years later, aged 77, of dengue fever.
