= Sharanabasappa Appaji =

Indian philosopher (1935–2025)

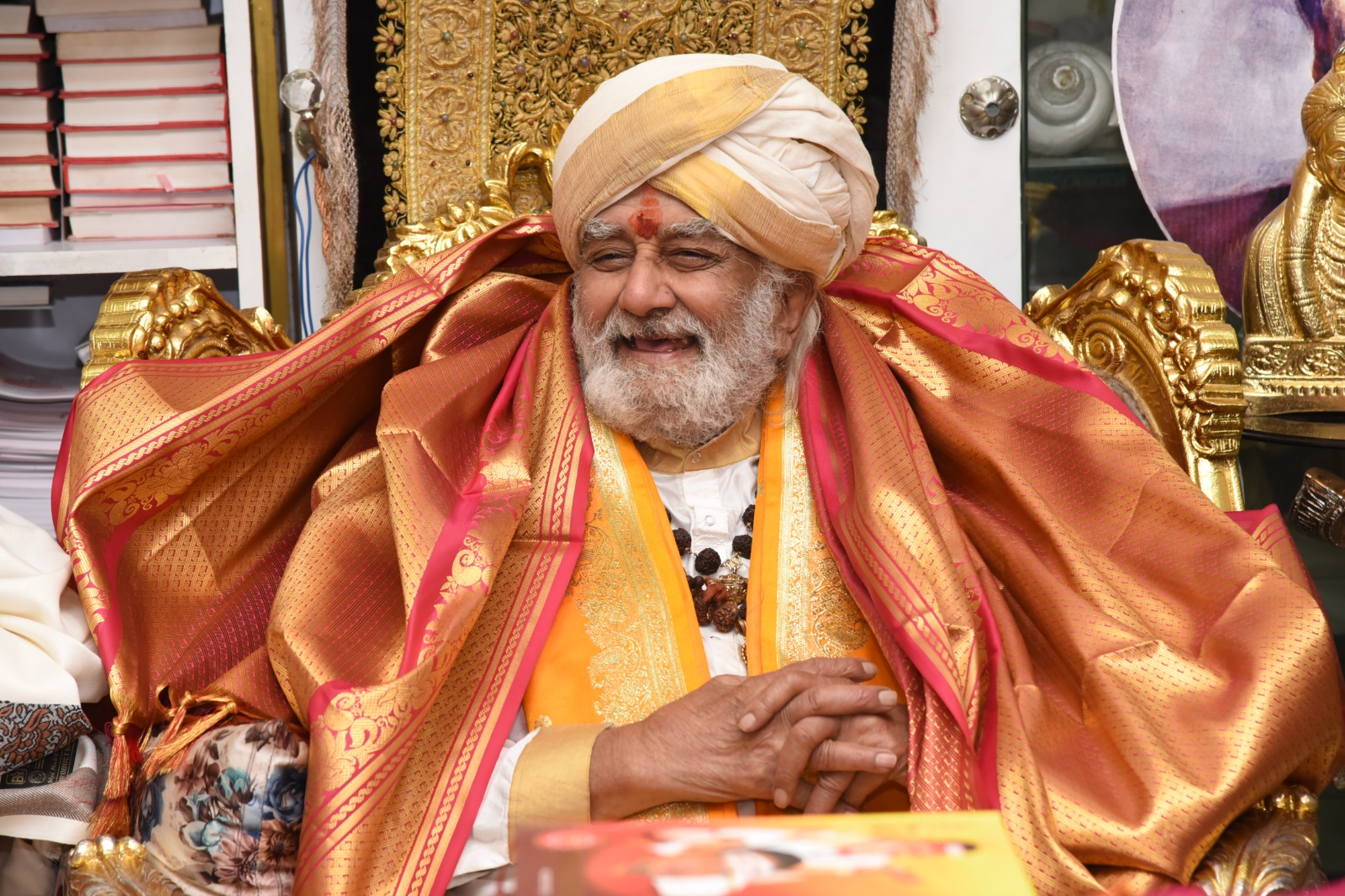
- Born: 14 November 1935; Kalaburagi, Karnataka, India
- Died: 14 August 2025; Karnataka
- Occupations: Educationist, chancellor
- Awards: Rajyotsava Award

Poojya Sharanabasappa Appaji (14 November 1935 – 14 August 2025) was an Indian philosopher, educationist, and social worker. He was the founder and chancellor of Sharnbasva University, Karnataka. He was the 8th Peetadhipathi of the Sharanabasaveshwara Sansthan Kalaburagi.

== Sharanabasaveshwar Samsthan ==
Appaji was the 8th Peetadhipathi of the Sharanabasaveshwara Sansthan Kalaburagi. After the death of Appaji, his son Doddappa Appa was crowned as the 9th Peetadhipati of Sharanabasaveshwar Samsthan.

== Philanthropy ==
Sharanbasappa Appa devoted his life to enhancing educational possibilities for the disadvantaged, establishing the Samsthana as a prominent center of learning.

He established many educational institutions, such as "Sharnbasveshwar College of Science, Kalaburagi" and "Godutai Doddappa Appa Women's college Gulbarga" in the region and has made significant contributions to the field of education. In Karnataka, he has created schools for engineering, women's education, and degree programs, benefiting both students and those in need.

== In popular culture ==
On 15 August 2025, the Karnataka government bestowed full state honors upon Appaji.

== Awards and honors ==
- In 1988, Government of Karnataka felicitated the Rajyotsava Award to Appaji

== Illness and death ==
Appaji died on 14 August 2025 in Kalaburagi. He had been suffering from a prolonged age-related illness.
