= Radhakrishnan (name) =

Radhakrishnan, also spelt Rathakrishnan, is a common Indian given name.

== Notable people with this name ==
- Radhakrishna (politician), an Indian politician
- C. Radhakrishnan, Malayalam writer
- Koppillil Radhakrishnan, former Chairman of ISRO
- P. Radhakrishnan (scientist), space scientist
- K. Radhakrishnan (politician), a politician from Kerala
- K. Radhakrishnan (police officer) (born 1957), an Indian Police Service officer
- Kiliroor Radhakrishnan, Indian short story writer
- Mina Radhakrishnan, American entrepreneur
- Pon Radhakrishnan, Indian Bharatiya Janata Party politician
- R. Radhakrishnan (literary critic), Chancellor's Professor of English and Comparative Literature
- R. Radhakrishnan (politician, born 1971) (born 1975), politician
- Radhakrishnan Nair Harshan, captain in Indian Army
- Sarvepalli Radhakrishnan, Indian philosopher and statesman
- Venkatraman Radhakrishnan, Indian space scientist
- Rathakrishnan Ramasamy, Singaporean juvenile offender
- Julie Radhakrishnan, American politician

== See also ==
- Radha Krishna (disambiguation)
