= Basavaraj Patil Sedam =

Indian politician

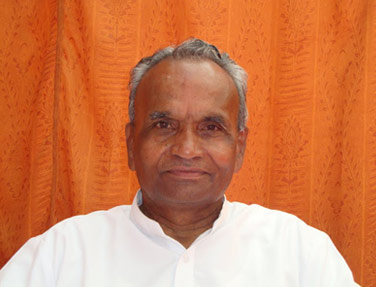

Member of Parliament Rajya Sabha
- In office 3 April 2012 – 2 April 2018
- Preceded by: Hema Malini
- Succeeded by: L. Hanumanthaiah
- Constituency: Karnataka

President Bharatiya Janata Party, Karnataka
- In office 2000–2003
- Preceded by: B. S. Yediyurappa
- Succeeded by: Ananth Kumar

Member of Parliament Lok Sabha
- In office 1998–1999
- Preceded by: Qamar ul Islam
- Succeeded by: Iqbal Ahmed Saradgi
- Constituency: Gulbarga

Member of Karnataka Legislative Council
- In office 1 July 1990 – 30 June 1996
- Constituency: Teachers

Personal details
- Born: 10 February 1944 (age 82) Taranhalli
- Party: BJP
- Spouse: Shrimati Baswalingamma
- Profession: Agriculturist/Farmer and Social Worker

Basavaraj Ganpathrao Patil Sedam (born 10 February 1944) is an Indian politician who was the member of parliament in the Lok Sabha from Kalaburagi and member of parliament in the Rajya Sabha from Karnataka. He is a Patron Of Bharat Vikas Sangam and He is brought up in the severe atmosphere of Tarnahalli, in the midst of god fearing, nature-loving agriculturists. His early education was in the Village School, which Studying for his Science graduation, he was attracted to the cultural organization Rashtriya Swamyam Sevak Sangha.

The cardinal aim of the organization was the resurrection of Hindu Culture and ethos. This principle attracted Sri Patil and he became its full-time worker named a PRACHARAK. Some of the Notable milestones of his public service and philanthropic activities are enumerated here

In the year 1974 with the holy blessings of Poojya Sri Madivalayya Swamiji of Sri Kottala Basaveshwara Temple, Sedam a unique educational cultural and social organization was started under the banner of Sri Kottala Basaveshwara Bharatiya Shikshana Samiti Sedam. Under this, Samiti started Nursery school, High schools, Junior college, First-grade college, D Ed college, Law college, CBSE School and State Board English Medium School. Along with this, Samiti also started the school of music, gymnasium, medical center, Goshala & others institutions. More than 7000 students are studying in this educational institution with nearly 400 teaching and non-teaching staff.

Sri Basavaraj Patil Sedam desire that the development activity should be with the active participation of the general public. By this socio – cultural and educational activities we have to erase the nameplate "Backward Region".

As an Ordent RSS worker

- Swaymasevak in RSS 1954
- Pracharak – Santal paragana Dist in Bihar Tribal area 1967 – 73
- Yeoman Service rendered in Famine relief work in Gulbarga Dist.
- Managed 40 poor feeding centers in the famine hit areas.

Service in Social Sector

- Patron-Bharat Vikas Sangam
- Founder & President Sri Sharanappa Paramanna Kanagadda Trust Sedam
- Member – Karnataka Asprishyata Nivarana Samiti
- Member – Hyderabad Karnataka Development Board Gulbara
- Secretary – Sri Kottala Basaveshwara Temple Trust
- Chief coordinator – Hyderabad Karnataka Abhivridhi Vibhaga an initiative to erase the name plate of Backward Region comprising Bidar, Gulbarga, Raichur, Koppal Dist.
- Active Member of many Organizations working in the field of culture, Social Service History & Literature.

Service in the field of Education :

- President : Bharatiya Vidya Kendra Sirnoor – Gulbarga – Residential School
- Member : Shikshana Vikas Parishad Bangalore – Karnataka
- Member : Vidya Bharati Karnataka
- Org. Secretary – Karnataka Rajya Madhyamik Shikshalok Sangha
- Founder Member : Nrupatunga Adhyana Kendra, sedam
- Co-op Member – Hyderabad Hindi Prachar Sabha
- Donor Member – Karnataka Rajya Vignana Parishad, Bangalore
- Vice – President – Vignaneshwara Souhardha Bhavan, Martur
- National co-ordinator- Bharat Vikas Sangama since 2007
- President – Vikas Academy Gulbarga
- Adm-Director – Vinayak Trust (intellectually disabled Children School)
- Member – Swadeshi Jagaran Mancha – New Delhi
- Petron, Shri Kottal Basweswar Bhartiya Sikshan Samiti
- Managing Trustee For Vikas Academy (KBVS Sedam) For The Total Development Hyderabad-Karnataka Region.

Award and Honor:

- Suyatindra award from Sri Raghavendra Swamiji temple Mantralayam in the year 2007
- Karnataka Rajyostava Prashasti in the year 2009
- In the year 2011 Gulbarga University honored Doctorate award for Best social service in 4 dist.s of Hyderabad Karnataka area
- Good educationist award from Sri Murugha math, Hubli 2012 January

In Political Area:

- Member – Karnataka Legislative Counsel (Teachers Constituency) – 1990- 1996
- Vice President – BJP Karnataka 1991-93
- Secretary – BJP 1993-96
- Member of Parliament Gulbarga 1998-99
- National Secretary – BJP New Delhi
- Member – Human Resource Development Committee Ministry of HRD Govt of India – Women empowerment committee Govt of India
- President: Karnataka State BJP 2000-2003
- Member Rajya Sabha From April 2012 to March 2018
- Participated in 137th Inter-Parliamentary Union at St.Petersburg (Russian Federation) on 14-18 Oct 2017.

== Family and personal life ==
Basvaraj Patil Sedam was born to Shrimati Shankramma and Shri Ganpath Rao on 10 February 1944 in Tarnalli, Kalaburagi district Karnataka. He completed his Bachelor of Science from the Government Degree College, Gulbarga. He is married to Baswalingamma.

== Positions held ==
- 1990-96 Member, Karnataka Legislative Council.
- 1992 Member, Public Accounts Committee, Karnataka Legislative Council.
- 1998-1999 Member, Twelfth Lok Sabha Member, Committee on Human Resource Development and its Sub-Committee on Value Based Education Member, Consultative Committee for the Ministry of Urban Affairs and Employment Member, Joint Committee on the Empowerment of Women.
- April 2012 Elected to Rajya Sabha May 2012 onwards Member, Committee on Industry Member, Central Silk Board.

Lok Sabha
Preceded by Qamar ul Islam	Member of Parliament for Gulbarga; 1998–1999	Succeeded by Iqbal Ahmed Saradgi
