= Basawaraj Jawali =

Indian politician

Member of Parliament, Lok Sabha
- In office 1989–1991
- Preceded by: Veerendra Patil
- Succeeded by: Qamar ul Islam
- Constituency: Gulbarga, Karnataka
- In office 1991–1996
- Constituency: Gulbarga, Karnataka

Personal details
- Born: 6 October 1937 Aland, Karnataka
- Party: Indian National Congress
- Spouse: Lalitha B. Jawali (14 May 1965)
- Parent: Gurushantappa (father)
- Profession: Medical Practitioner, E.N.T. Surgeon, Agriculturist, Sportsman, Educationist and Industrialist

Dr. Basawaraj Jawali is an Indian politician of the Indian National Congress. He served as the Member of Parliament (MP) 2 times, represented the Gulbarga in Lok Sabha the lower house of the Indian Parliament. He also served as a Principal of M.R. Medical College in Gulbarga, President of H.K. Education Society of Gulbarga, Secretary of Rotary Club, vice-president of Indian Medical Association in Gulbarga, Member of Post Graduate Institute of Medical Education and Research - Chandigarh, since 5 April 1990.

== Early life and background ==
Basawaraj Jawali was born on 6 October 1937 in Aland, Karnataka. Gurushantappa was his father. He completed his education from Karnataka Medical College in Hubli (Karnataka).

== Personal life ==
Dr. Jawali married Lalitha B. Jawali on 14 May 1965. The couple has one son and two daughters.

== Political career ==
Dr. Jawali was first elected to 9th Lok Sabha in 1989 from Gulbarga. He was re-elected 10th Lok Sabha in 1991.

== Position held ==
- Principal - M.R. Medical College, Gulbarga.
- President - H.K. Education Society, Gulbarga.
- Secretary - Rotary Club.
- Vice-president - Indian Medical Association, Gulbarga.
- Member - Post Graduate Institute of Medical Education and Research, Chandigarh since 5 April 1990.

| # | From | To | Position |
|---|---|---|---|
| 1. | 1989 | 1991 | MP (1st term) in 9th Lok Sabha from Gulbarga.: 1990 - Member of Consultative Committee, Ministry of Human Resource Development |
| 2. | 1991 | 1996 | MP (2nd term) in 10th Lok Sabha from Gulbarga. |
