= Nelogi =

Nelogi nelligi
- village
- Location in Karnataka, India Nelogi (India)
- Coordinates: 17°04′N 76°37′E
- Country: India
- State: Karnataka
- District: Gulbarga
- Talukas: Jevargi

Area
  - Total: 45 km^{2} (17 sq mi)
- Elevation: 413 m (1,355 ft)

Population (2020)
  - Total: 7,654
  - Density: 142/km^{2} (370/sq mi)

Languages
  - Official: Kannada
- Time zone: UTC+5:30 (IST)
- PIN: 585310

Nelogi is a village in the southern state of Karnataka, India, It is located in the Jevargi taluk of Kalaburagi district in Karnataka, India,
Nelogi is the famous for Sri Hanuman temple Every year Hanuman Jayanthi and Ashada chaturthi are celebrated very well in this temple. Nelogi is the birthplace of sri neelakanthappa sahu devaramani Ex MLA jewargi and also birthplace of Dharmasingh ex chief minister of karnataka and Dr ajysingh mla jewargi, sri allamprabhu patil mla kalaburagi south and sri vijay singh mlc and sharankumar modi ex mayor kalaburagi and Dr shivanand Devarmani ex vice president HKE society's kalaburagiof Karnataka.

== Demographics ==
As of 2001 India census, Nelogi had a population of 5169 with 2708 males and 2461 females.

== See also ==
- Gulbarga
- Districts of Karnataka
