= Mahadevappa Rampure Medical College =

Medical college in Gulbarga, Karnatka, India

Coordinates: 17.3292°N 76.8435°E

- Type: Private
- Established: 1963; 63 years ago
- Founder: Mahadevappa Rampure
- Parent institution: Hyderabad Karnataka Education Society
- Academic affiliations: Rajiv Gandhi University of Health Sciences
- Principal: Dr. Veerabhadrappa Nandyal
- Dean: Dr. Sharanagouda S. Patil
- Administrative staff: 250
- Undergraduates: 150
- Postgraduates: 99
- Location: Kalaburagi, Karnataka, India
- Campus: Sedam Road, Kalaburagi
- Website: mrmc.hkes.edu.in

Mahadevappa Rampure Medical College (MRMC) is a semi-government medical college in Gulbarga, Karnataka, India. The college is affiliated to Rajiv Gandhi University of Health Sciences, Bangalore.

== History ==
Hyderabad Karnataka Education Society established MRMC in 1963, and opened Basaveshwar Teaching and General Hospital in January 1967. The college received recognition from the Medical Council of India in 1972.

== Teaching Hospital ==
The clinical training was initially at the present District General Hospital in Gulbarga. From 2005, all clinical teaching activity was moved to hospitals operated by the college, Basaveshwara Teaching and General Hospital, Gulbarga and Sangameshwar Teaching Hospital to satisfy Medical Council of India requirements.

== Departments ==
- Anatomy
- Physiology
- Biochemistry
- Pharmacology
- Pathology
- Microbiology
- Forensic Medicine
- Community Medicine
- General Medicine
- Psychiatry
- Tuberculosis & Chest Diseases
- Skin & Venereal Disease
- General Surgery
- Orthopaedics
- Ophthalmology
- Ear, Nose & Throat
- Radiology
- Anaesthesiology
- Paediatrics
- Obstetrics & Gynecology

== Notable alumni ==
- Dr. Y.S. Raja Sekhara Reddy, Former Chief Minister of Andhra Pradesh.
- Dr Sharanprakash Patil, Cabinet Minister, Government of Karnataka
- Dr Chandrasekhar Patil, Member of Karnataka Legislative Council
- Dr Neeraj Patil, former mayor of Lambeth
- Dr Sharan Patil, Chairman of Sparsh Groups of Hospitals
