= Radha Krishna (disambiguation) =

Radha Krishna is the combined forms of feminine and masculine realities of God in Hinduism.

Radha Krishna may also refer to:

== Media ==
- Radha Krishna (1933 film), a Bengali religious film released in 1933
- The Radha Krsna Temple (album), a 1971 album of devotional songs by the London Radha Krishna Temple
- RadhaKrishn, Indian television series released in 2018

== People ==
- Krish (director) (born Radha Krishna Jagarlamudi on 11 November, 1978), an Indian film director
- Sarvepalli Radhakrishnan Second President of India
- Radhakrishna (politician), an Indian politician
- Radha Krishna Choudhary (15 February 1921 – 15 March 1985), a professor, writer, and historian
- Radha Krishna Kishore, an Indian politician
- Radha Krishna Kumar (born 2 August 1984), an Indian film director and producer
- Radha Krishna Mainali (born 26 September, 1946), a Nepalese politician
- S. Radha Krishna, an Indian film producer

== Places ==
- Radha Krishna Temple, an International Society for Krishna Consciousness temple located in London, England
- Radha Krishna Temple, Dallas, a Hindu temple located in Dallas, Texas

== See also ==
- Radhakrishnan (name), list of people with this given name or surname
