= Basaveshwara Teaching and General Hospital, Kalaburagi =

Basaveshwara Teaching and General Hospital
- Hyderabad Karnataka Education Society

Geography
- Location: Sedam road,, Gulbarga, Karnataka, India

Organisation
- Care system: Private

Services
- Emergency department: Yes
- Beds: 820

History
- Founded: 1990

Links
- Website: bh.hkes.edu.in
- Lists: Hospitals in India

Basaveshwara Teaching and General Hospital, Gulbarga is a private hospital affiliated with Mahadevappa Rampure Medical College (MRMC) in Gulbarga, Karnataka state, India. It is a renowned hospital in the name of Basaveshwara.

== History ==
The people of Gulbarga region was rushing neighbouring states Maharashtra (Solapur), Andhra Pradesh now Telangana (Hyderabad) cities for health care facilities. Hyderabad Karnataka Education Society started Mahadevappa Rampure Medical College in 1963 and in 1989 Hyderabad Karnataka Education Society started Basaveshwara Teaching and General Hospital, Gulbarga.

== Departments ==
- General Medicine
- General Surgery
- Anesthesia.
- Radiology
- Pediatrics
- Orthopedics
- Obstetrics & Gynecology
- Ophthalmology
- Dermatology, Venerealogy & Leprosy
- Psychiatry
- Pulmonary Medicine (Chest & TB)
- Pathology
- Oncology
- Neuro Surgery
- Plastic Surgery
- Urology
