= L. Hanumanthaiah =

Indian politician and Poet

Member of Karnataka Legislative Council
- Preceded by: Basavaraj Patil Sedam, BJP
- In office 2001 - 2007

Member of Parliament, Rajya Sabha
- In office 2018-2024

Member, Committee on Transport, Tourism and Culture
- In office June 2018 - May 2019

Member, Consultative Committee for the Ministry of Social Justice and Empowerment
- In office June 2018 - May 2019 and Oct. 2019 onwards

Member, Committee on Health and Family Welfare
- In office September 2019 onwards

Member, Governing Body of the Indian Council of Medical Research
- In office March 2020 onwards

Member, Committee on Petitions
- In office July 2020 onwards

Member, General Purposes Committee
- In office August 2020 onwards

Member, Committee on the Welfare of Scheduled Castes and Scheduled Tribes
- In office September 2020 - April 2021

Personal details
- Born: 10 June 1958 (age 66); Rameshwara
- Political party: Indian National Congress
- Spouse: Shrimati Vijayambaike H.
- Children: One son and one daughter
- Parent: Lankappa (father) Shrimati Channamma (mother)
- Education: B.Sc., M.A., PhD.
- Alma mater: Bangalore University and Mysore University
- Profession: Writer, agriculturist
- Awards: 1. Visweswaraiah Puraskar (1988) 2. Saranga Mutt Prize for Poetry (1995) 3. Sahithya Parishat Endowment Prize for Poetry (1995) 4. Ambedkar Award from Attimabbe Trust for social and literary (1999) 5. Naadachetana Award (2000) 6. Katharangam Award (2001) 7. Sahitya Parishat Endowment Prize for Poetry (2001) 8. Ambedkar Award of Govt. of Karnataka (2001) 9. Sahithya Academy Award for best book of the year (2008) 10. Sahithya Academy Honorary Award for Lifetime Achievement in Literature (2015) 11. Kuvempu Award for Literature and Social Work (2015)
- Website: https://www.drlhanumanthaiah.info/

Lankappa Hanumanthaiah is an Indian poet, politician of the Indian National Congress and a member of the upper house of the Indian Parliament, the Rajya Sabha, from the state of Karnataka.

== Early life and background ==
Lankappa Hanumanthaiah was born to Lankappa and Shrimati Channamma on 10 June 1958.

Hanumanthaiah studied at Government Science College, Bangalore, Post Graduate Studies in Kannada Literature at Bangalore University and Ph.D. from Mysore University.

== Books published ==
=== Poetry ===
1. Kappu Kannina Hudugi (Black-eyed Girl), 1990
2. Avva (Mother), 1995
3. Avvana Kavithe (Mother's Poem), (the poems have been translated and published in Bengali, Gujarati, English, Malayalam and Tamil languages),
4. Akshara Aksharave (Oh' Letters! My Letters!), 2001
5. Karna Raaga (Karna's Agony), 2008
6. Harigolu (Hudder), 2012
7. ಕಳ್ಳಿ ಹಾಲಿನ ಕಡಲು : Kalli Halina Kadalu - Published on 17 August 2020
8. ಒಂಟಿ ಕಾಲಿನ ನಡಿಗೆ : Onti Kalina Nadige - Published on 3 September 2020
1. Dalitha Lokada Olage (In the world of Dalits), 1989
2. Ambedkar Mattu Samakaaleenathe (Ambedkar and Contemporary Times), 1993
3. Kanakadasa (biography on saint poet of medieval Karnataka), 1995

=== Research thesis ===
1. Katha Kathana (thesis on stories), 1999
2. Ambedkar (a play), (the play has been staged at Bangalore, Bellary, Tumkur, Chitradurga and other parts of Karnataka), 1998; Autobiography - Ontikalina Nadige (walk in one leg)

=== Edited works ===
1. Ambedkar Kavithegalu (An Anthology of Poems on Dr Ambedkar) for Karnataka Sahitya Academy
2. Dalitha Kathegalu (An Anthology of Dalit Short Stories) for Karnataka Sahitya Academy
3. Kelavargada Vachanakaararu (Saint poets from the lower strata of the society of 12th century Karnataka)
4. Rangabhumi Antharanga: C.G.K. (a commemorative volume on a well-known theatre Director Sri C.G. Krishna Swamy) and (v) Suvarna Sanchaya ( An Anthology of Modern Kannada Poetry from the beginning of the 20th century) for Kannada Sahitya Parishad; Chairman, Committee for publishing Babu Jagjivan Ram’s works in Kannada

== Position held ==
Year	Description
1995 - 1996	Member, Kannada Development Authority, Government of Karnataka
1996 - 1998	Member, State Executive Committee, Kannada Sahitya Parishat
1998	Jury Member, Karnataka Sahitya Academy Award
1998	Member, Kannada Book Authority
1999 - 2000	Member, Ambedkar Annual Award Committee, Government of Karnataka
2000	Member, Script Approval Committee, Doordarshan Kendra, Bangalore
2001 - 2007	Member, Karnataka Legislative Council
2002 - 2005	Member, Academic Council, Bangalore University
2003 - 2007	Member, Kannada Advisory Board, Central Sahitya Academy, New Delhi
2004	Member, Kannada Advisory Board, National Book Trust, New Delhi
2015 - 2017	Chairman, Kannada Development Authority
June 2018 - May 2019	Member, Committee on Transport, Tourism and Culture
June 2018 - May 2019 and Oct. 2019 onwards	Member, Consultative Committee for the Ministry of Social Justice and Empowerment
Sept. 2019 onwards	Member, Committee on Health and Family Welfare
March 2020 onwards	Member, Governing Body of the Indian Council of Medical Research
July 2020	Nominated to the Panel of Vice-Chairmen, Rajya Sabha
July 2020 onwards	Member, Committee on Petitions
Aug. 2020 onwards	Member, General Purposes Committee
Sept. 2020 - April 2021	Member, Committee on the Welfare of Scheduled Castes and Scheduled Tribes
