= Gulbarga Lok Sabha constituency =

Lok Sabha Constituency in Karnataka, India

Coordinates: 17.3°N 76.8°E

Gulbarga
- Lok Sabha constituency
- Gulbarga Lok Sabha Constituency Map

Constituency details
- Country: India
- Region: South India
- State: Karnataka
- District: Gulbarga
- Assembly constituencies: Afzalpur; Jewargi; Gurmitkal; Chittapur; Sedam; Gulbarga Rural; Gulbarga Dakshin; Gulbarga Uttar
- Established: 1952
- Total electors: 20,65,018 (2024)
- Reservation: SC

Member of Parliament
- 18th Lok Sabha
- Incumbent Radhakrishna
- Party: Indian National Congress
- Elected year: 2024

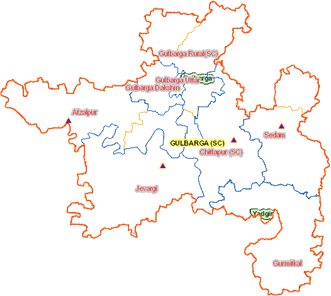
Constituency Map by Assembly and Taluk borders

Gulbarga Lok Sabha constituency is one of the 28 Lok Sabha constituencies in Karnataka state in India.This constituency was created before the first general elections in 1951.

== Assembly segments ==
Presently, Gulbarga Lok Sabha constituency comprises the following eight Legislative Assembly segments:

No	Name	District	Member	Party	Party Leading (in 2024)
34	Afzalpur	Kalaburagi	M. Y. Patil	INC	BJP
35	Jewargi	Kalaburagi	Ajay Singh	INC	BJP
39	Gurmitkal	Yadgir	Sharanagouda Kandakur	JD(S)	BJP
40	Chittapur (SC)	Kalaburagi	Priyank Kharge	INC	INC
41	Sedam	Kalaburagi	Sharan Prakash Patil	INC	INC
43	Gulbarga Rural (SC)	Kalaburagi	Basawaraj Mattimud	BJP	INC
44	Gulbarga Dakshin	Kalaburagi	Allamprabhu Patil	INC	BJP
45	Gulbarga Uttar	Kalaburagi	Kaneez Fathima	INC	INC

== Members of Parliament ==
Year	Name	Party
1952	Swami Ramananda Tirtha	Indian National Congress
1957	Mahadevappa Rampure	Indian National Congress
1962	Mahadevappa Rampure	Indian National Congress
1967	Mahadevappa Rampure	Indian National Congress
1971	Dharamrao Afzalpurkar	Indian National Congress
1974^	Sidram Reddi	Indian National Congress
1977	Sidram Reddi	Indian National Congress
1980	Dharam Singh	Indian National Congress
1980^	C. M. Stephen	Indian National Congress
1984	Veerendra Patil	Indian National Congress
1989	B.G. Jawali	Indian National Congress
1991	B.G. Jawali	Indian National Congress
1996	Qamar ul Islam	Janata Dal
1998	Basavaraj Patil Sedam	Bharatiya Janata Party
1999	Iqbal Ahmed Saradgi	Indian National Congress
2004	Iqbal Ahmed Saradgi	Indian National Congress
2009	Mallikarjun Kharge	Indian National Congress
2014	Mallikarjun Kharge	Indian National Congress
2019	Umesh Jadhav	Bharatiya Janata Party
2024	Radhakrishna	Indian National Congress

^-bypoll

== Election results ==
Vote share of Winning candidates
2024	49.78%
2019	52.14%
2014	50.82%
2009	45.43%
2004	37.76%
1999	47.60%
1998	44.72%
1996	35.90%
1991	43.94%
1989	47.39%
1984	58.75%
1980 (by-poll)	62.33%
1980	56.20%
1977	60.67%
1974 (by-poll)	0.00%
1971	68.06%
1967	58.77%
1962	52.28%
1957	26.18%
1957	25.28%
1951	52.84%

=== 2024 ===
2024 Indian general election: Gulbarga
Party	Candidate	Votes	%	±%
INC	Radhakrishna Doddamani	652,321	49.78	+5.66
BJP	Umesh. G. Jadhav	6,25,116	47.70	−4.44
NOTA	None of the above	8,429	0.64	−0.26
Majority		27,205	2.08	−5.94
Turnout		13,11,233	62.48	
INC gain from BJP		Swing		

=== 2019 ===
2019 Indian general elections: Gulbarga
Party	Candidate	Votes	%	±%
BJP	Umesh Jadhav	620,192	52.14	+8.81
INC	Mallikarjun Kharge	524,740	44.12	−8.27
BSP	K. B. Vasu	10,865	0.91	−0.23
NOTA	None of the Above	10,487	0.88	−0.11
SVP	Vijay Jadhav	6,507	0.55	
Majority		95,457	8.02	
Turnout		11,90,471	61.18	+3.22
BJP gain from INC		Swing	+8.54	

=== 2014 ===
2014 Indian general elections: Gulbarga
Party	Candidate	Votes	%	±%
INC	Mallikarjun Kharge	507,193	50.82	+5.36
BJP	Revu Naik Belamgi	4,32,460	43.33	−0.37
JD(S)	D. G. Sagar	15,690	1.57	−2.00
BSP	Mahadev B. Dhanni	11,428	1.14	−0.65
AAP	B. T. Lalitha Naik	9,074	0.91	N/A
NOTA	None of the Above	9,888	0.99	N/A
Majority		74,733	7.49	+5.73
Turnout		9,98,086	57.96	+8.77
INC hold		Swing	+5.36	

=== 2009 ===
2009 Indian general elections: Gulbarga
Party	Candidate	Votes	%	±%
INC	Mallikarjun Kharge	345,241	45.43	
BJP	Revu Naik Belamgi	3,31,837	43.67	
JD(S)	Babu Honna Naik	27,130	3.57	
IND	Shivakumar Kollur	13,818	1.82	
BSP	Mahadev B. Dhanni	13,575	1.79	
Majority		13,404	1.76	
Turnout		7,59,693	49.22	
INC hold		Swing		

=== 2004 ===
2004 Indian general election: Gulbarga
Party	Candidate	Votes	%	±%
INC	Iqbal Ahmed Saradgi	312,601	37.76	
BJP	Basawaraj Patil Sedam	255,130	30.82	
JD(S)	Vithal Heroor	189,100	22.84	
BSP	Suryakant Nimbalkar	26,724	3.23	
IND	2 Independent Candidates	21,961	2.65	
OTH	5 Other Party Candidates	22,378	2.70	
Majority		57,471	6.94	
Turnout				
INC hold		Swing		

=== 1999 ===
1999 Indian general election: Gulbarga
Party	Candidate	Votes	%	±%
INC	Iqbal Ahmed Saradgi	352,359	47.60	
BJP	Basavaraj Patil Sedam	282,522	38.17	
JD(S)	Malleshappa Yavoor	65,756	8.88	
BSP	Vithal Heroor	35,465	4.79	
IND	Hamid Pasha Sarmasth	4,141	0.56	
Majority		69,837	9.43	
Turnout		773,746	60.42	
Swing to INC from BJP		Swing		

=== 1998 ===
1998 Indian general election: Gulbarga
Party	Candidate	Votes	%	±%
BJP	Baswaraj Patil Sedam	328,982	44.72	
JD	Qamarul Islam	197,184	26.80	
INC	Dr. B. G. Jawali	140,913	19.15	
BSP	Vithal Heroor	55,583	7.56	
SAP	S. K. Kanta	7,671	1.04	
BMSM	Mahamed Masaq Ali	3,030	0.41	
RJD	Khalid Kareem Khan	1,456	0.20	
IUML	Abdul Hamid Dabar	889	0.12	
Majority		131,798	17.92	
Turnout		751,734	59.00	
Swing to BJP from JD		Swing		

=== 1996 ===
1996 Indian general election: Gulbarga
Party	Candidate	Votes	%	±%
JD	Qamarul Islam	203,521	35.90	
BJP	Basawaraj Patil Sedam	187,976	33.16	
INC	Dr. B. G. Jawali	132,383	23.35	
KCP (Note: Karnataka Congress Party)	Shivayya Kusayya Guttedar	15,444	2.72	
IND	15 Independent Candidates	27,618	4.88	
Majority		15,545	2.74	
Turnout		580,679	48.21	
Swing to JD from INC		Swing		

=== 1991 ===
1991 Indian general election: Gulbarga
Party	Candidate	Votes	%	±%
INC	B. G. Jawali	182,351	43.94	
BJP	Basawaraj Patil Sedam	120,268	28.98	
JP	Vaijanath Patil	89,760	21.63	
RPI(K)	Sujatha Parmeshwar Jane	1,284	0.31	
IND	11 Independent Candidates	21,299	5.13	
Majority		62,083	14.96	
Turnout		426,525	40.93	
INC hold		Swing		

=== 1989 ===
1989 Indian general election: Gulbarga
Party	Candidate	Votes	%	±%
INC	B. G. Jawali	283,796	47.39	
JD	Abdul Hameed	174,958	29.21	
JP	Malleshappa Yewoor	92,907	15.51	
IND	5 Independent Candidates	27,892	4.66	
OTH	3 Other Party Candidates	19,350	3.23	
Majority		108,838	18.18	
Turnout		637,640	61.57	
INC hold		Swing		

=== 1984 ===
1984 Indian general election: Gulbarga
Party	Candidate	Votes	%	±%
INC	Veerendra Patil	235,751	58.75	
JP	Vidyadhar Guruji	140,261	34.95	
IND	7 Independent Candidates	25,257	6.30	
Majority		95,490	23.80	
Turnout		415,495	54.06	
INC hold		Swing		

=== 1980 by-election ===
1980 Indian by-election: Gulbarga
Party	Candidate	Votes	%	±%
INC(I)	C. M. Stephen	150,665	62.33	
INC(O)	B. R. Gouda	76,985	31.85	
IND	C. M. Swamy	4,224	1.75	
IND	G. V. Naindu	4,144	1.71	
IND	N. L. Muttangi	3,544	1.47	
IND	H. Jayappa	2,158	0.89	
Majority		73,680	30.48	
Turnout				
INC(I) hold		Swing		

=== 1980 ===
1980 Indian general election: Gulbarga
Party	Candidate	Votes	%	±%
INC(I)	Dharam Singh	174,398	56.20	
JP	Vaijnath Patil	56,422	18.18	
INC(U)	Sidram Reddy	48,959	15.78	
JP(S)	Veeranna Thimmaji	16,442	5.30	
IND	Narasappa Lachappa Muttangi	7,352	2.37	
IND	Mahadevappa T. Patil	6,770	2.18	
Majority		117,976	38.02	
Turnout		322,788	46.06	
Swing to INC(I) from INC		Swing		

=== 1977 ===
1977 Indian general election: Gulbarga
Party	Candidate	Votes	%	±%
INC	Sidram Reddi	188,381	60.67	
JP	Govind Vadeyaraj	102,989	33.17	
CPI	Sriniwas Gudi	19,152	6.17	
Majority		85,392	27.50	
Turnout		322,935	51.28	
INC hold		Swing		

=== 1971 ===
1971 Indian general election: Gulbarga
Party	Candidate	Votes	%	±%
INC	Dharamrao Afzalpurkar	171,264	68.06	
INC(O)	Sharanbasappa Appa Doddappa	75,690	30.08	
IND	B. Shamsunder Manikyam	4,691	1.86	
Majority		95,574	37.98	
Turnout		262,905	50.20	
INC hold		Swing		

=== 1967 ===
1967 Indian general election: Gulbarga
Party	Candidate	Votes	%	±%
INC	Mahadevappa Rampure	136,188	58.77	
SWA	M. Virupakshayya	77,911	33.62	
ABJS	G. A. Rao	10,728	4.63	
IND	S. Sharnappa	6,910	2.98	
Majority		58,277	25.15	
Turnout		242,601	49.59	
INC hold		Swing		

=== 1962 ===
1962 Indian general election: Gulbarga
Party	Candidate	Votes	%	±%
INC	Mahadevappa Rampure	92,399	52.28	
SWA	Sharanagowda Sidramayya	84,326	47.72	
Majority		8,073	4.56	
Turnout		184,634	44.68	
INC hold		Swing		

=== 1957 ===
1957 Indian general election: Gulbarga (Two seats)
Party	Candidate	Votes	%	±%
INC	Mahadevappa Rampure	139,041	26.18	
INC	Shankardeo	134,239	25.28	
IND	Sharangowda Sidramayya	109,124	20.55	
IND	B. Sham Sunder	88,352	16.64	
PSP	R. V. Bidap	60,317	11.36	
Turnout		531,073	36.96	

=== 1951 ===
1951 Indian general election: Gulbarga
Party	Candidate	Votes	%	±%
INC	Swami Ramanand Tirtha	56,087	52.84	
IND	Saran Gowda	39,041	36.78	
Socialist	Sadashivappa D. Akki	11,012	10.37	
Majority		17,046	16.06	
Turnout		106,140	29.11	
INC win (new seat)				

== See also ==
- Yadgir Lok Sabha constituency
- Kalaburagi district
- List of constituencies of the Lok Sabha
