= Iqbal Ahmed Saradgi =

Indian politician (1944–2024)

Member of Parliament in 13th Lok Sabha
- In office 10 October 1999 – 6 February 2009
- Preceded by: himself
- Constituency: Gulbarga

Member of Parliament in 14th Lok Sabha
- In office 17 May 2004 – 18 May 2009
- Constituency: Gulbarga

Personal details
- Born: 5 June 1944 Gulbarga, Hyderabad State, India
- Died: 22 May 2024 (aged 79) Kalaburagi, Karnataka, India
- Party: INC
- Spouse: Sabiha Begam
- Children: 1 son and 1 daughter
- Parent: Gauhar Begam (Mother) Mohammed Ahmed Saradagi (Father)
- Education: B.A., LL.B.
- Alma mater: Government Arts and Science College, Gulbarga (Karnataka) and Law College, Osmania University, Hyderabad (Andhra Pradesh)
- Profession: Advocate, Agriculturist, Educationist
- As of 25 September, 2006

Iqbal Ahmed Saradgi (5 June 1944 – 22 May 2024) was an Indian politician and member of the 14th Lok Sabha (he represented the Gulbarga constituency of Karnataka) and member of Karnataka Legislative Council for the term 2014 to 2020. He was a member of the Indian National Congress (INC) political party.

== Early life and family ==
Iqbal Ahmed Saradgi was born to Mohammed Ahmed Saradgi and Gauhar Begam on 5 June 1944 in Gulbarga, Hyderabad State. He obtained his Bachelor of Arts education from Government Arts and Science College, Gulbarga (Mysore) and LLB (master's and law degrees) from Law College, Osmania University, Hyderabad (Andhra Pradesh). He was an advocate, an agriculturist and an educationist by profession.

== Constituency ==
Iqbal Ahmed Saradgi represented Gulbarga (Lok Sabha constituency) in 13th Lok Sabha and 14th Lok Sabha (Lower house).

== Established ==
- Al-Badar Educational and Charitable Trust at Gulbarga
- Al-Badar Rural Dental College at Gulbarga

== Political career ==
In the 2009 general elections for the 15th Lok Sabha, the Gulbarga constituency was made a reserved seat for SCs. Henceforth Saradgi gave the opportunity to Mallikarjun Kharge to contest the election as he belonged to that community. Mallikarjun Kharge won the seat and was Union Minister of Labour and Employment of the Republic of India.

Saradgi was still active in politics and was a senior member of the INC party until his death.

== Positions held ==
| # | From | To | Positions held |
|---|---|---|---|
| 1 | 1978 | 1979 | Chairman - Gulbarga City Improvement Board, Gulbarga. |
| 2 | 1992 | 1995 | Gulbarga Development Authority. |
| 3 | 1999 | 2004 | MP (1st term) in 13th Lok Sabha from Gulbarga.: Member of Committee on Home Affairs Member.; Member of Consultative Committee.; Member of the Ministry of Health Family Welfare.; Member, Joint Parliamentary Committee on the functioning of Wakf. |
| 4 | 2004 | 2009 | MP (2nd term) in 14th Lok Sabha from Gulbarga.: Member, Committee on Estimates; Member, Haj Committee of India; Member, Joint Parliamentary Committee on Wakf.; Member, Committee of Privileges (25 Aug 2006 onwards); Member, Committee on Railways (5 Aug 2007 onwards). |
| 5 | 2014 | 2020 | Member of Karnataka Legislative Council |

== Death ==
Saradgi died at a private hospital in Kalaburagi, on 22 May 2024, at the age of 79.
