= Dharam Singh =

11th Chief Minister of Karnataka

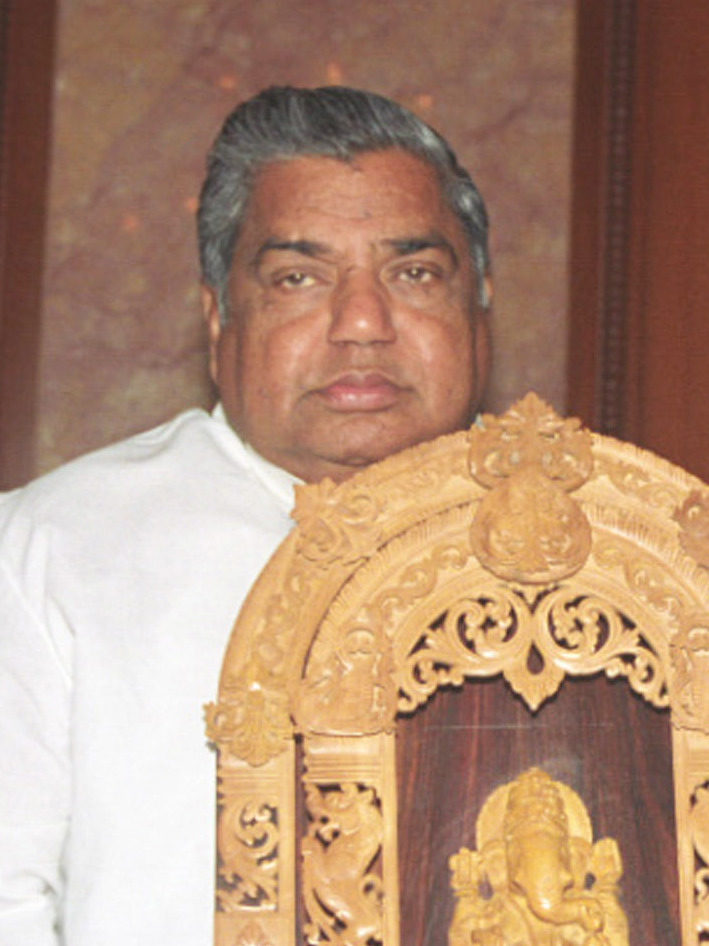

11th Chief Minister of Karnataka
- In office 28 May 2004 – 28 January 2006
- Preceded by: S. M. Krishna
- Succeeded by: H. D. Kumaraswamy

Member of Parliament, Lok Sabha
- In office 2009–2014
- Preceded by: Narsingrao Suryawanshi
- Succeeded by: Bhagwanth Khuba
- Constituency: Bidar
- In office 1980–1980
- Preceded by: Sidram Reddi
- Succeeded by: C. M. Stephen
- Constituency: Gulbarga

Member of the Karnataka Legislative Assembly
- In office 1972–2008
- Preceded by: S. Siddramgouda
- Succeeded by: Doddappagouda Patil
- Constituency: Jevargi

Minister of Public Works Department Government of Karnataka
- In office 1999–2004
- Succeeded by: H. D. Revanna

Leader of the Opposition, Karnataka Legislative Assembly
- In office 8 Feb 2006 – 28 Nov 2007
- Preceded by: B. S. Yediyurappa
- Succeeded by: Mallikarjun Kharge

Personal details
- Born: Dharam Narayan Singh; 25 December 1936 Nelogi, Hyderabad State, British India (present–day Karnataka, India)
- Died: 27 July 2017 (aged 80) Bengaluru, Karnataka, India
- Resting place: Nelogi
- Party: Indian National Congress
- Spouse: Prabhavati (m. 1970)
- Children: 3, including Ajay Singh, Vijay Singh
- Parents: Narayan Singh (father); Padmavathi Singh (mother)
- Education: Master of Arts; Bachelor of Laws
- Alma mater: Osmania University
- Nickname: Ajatashatru

Dharam Narayan Singh (25 December 1936 – 27 July 2017) was an Indian politician who served as the 11th Chief Minister of Karnataka from 28 May 2004 to 28 January 2006 and Member of the Lok Sabha from Bidar Lok Sabha constituency, in 15th Lok Sabha from 2009 to 2014.

He belonged to the Indian National Congress. He was the 18th President of the Karnataka Pradesh Congress Committee and he was the nine-term Member of the Karnataka Legislative Assembly from Jevaragi constituency.

== Early life and family ==
Dharam Singh was born in Nelogi village of Jevargi taluk (in Kalaburagi district of the Karnataka). He was from Rajput family, who are minority community in Karnataka. He obtained his master's and law degrees from Osmania University, Hyderabad.

== Political career ==
Singh began his career in politics as an Independent Corporator in the Kalaburagi district City Municipal Council by contesting against his own brother. He started his political career as a socialist. He was brought up under the influence of Bhim Sena founder B. Shyam Sunder who was a legislator to Hyderabad State and served as its Deputy speaker. He was the Secretary of Hyderabad Karnataka Youth League, and his election agent in 1957, and issued a pamphlet in Urdu to vote in his favour.

In the late 1960s, he joined the Indian National Congress and his loyalty made him a strong contender for the post of Chief Minister in 2004.

He gave up the Kalaburgi Lok Sabha seat of which he was the Member of Parliament to accommodate C.M. Stephen, who was a Union Minister in the Indira Gandhi Cabinet, in 1980 on Indira Gandhi's directions.

He has served as a minister under various chief ministers such as Devaraj Urs, R. Gundu Rao, S. Bangarappa, M. Veerappa Moily and S. M. Krishna, and has handled diverse portfolios such as Home, Excise, Social Welfare, Urban Development and Revenue. He was KPCC president in the 1990s when his party was out of power. At that time, the Congress' national leadership was headed by Sitaram Kesri, of whom Singh was said to be a favourite. He lost out to his senior colleague S. M. Krishna in the race to the Chief Minister's post in 1999. Then, he joined the Krishna ministry and handled the Public Works Department portfolio.

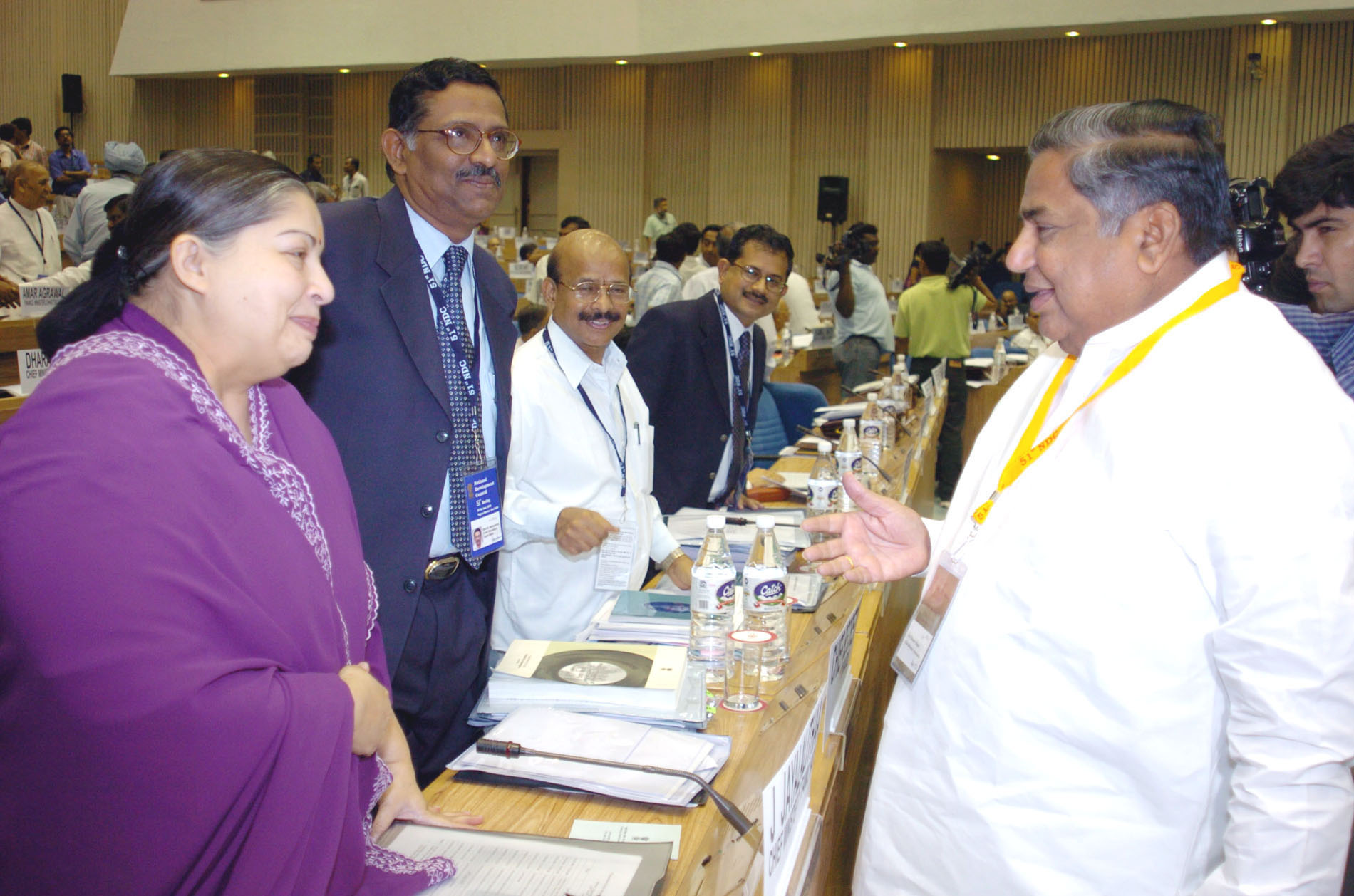
Dharam Singh with Tamil Nadu Chief Minister Jayalalithaa at NDC meeting in 2005

When the 2004 state elections resulted in a hung assembly with no party getting enough seats to form a government, the Congress and Janata Dal (Secular) (JD(S)) parties decided to come together and form a coalition government. Known for his adaptability and friendly nature and his close political ties with H. D. Deve Gowda, Dharam Singh was the unanimous choice of both parties to head the government. He was sworn in as Chief Minister on 28 May 2004. He was the second leader from Kalaburgi to become Chief Minister after Veerendra Patil. For almost 20 months, he led the fragile coalition through many ups and downs.

He was criticised for not being assertive in the sense of coming from minority community and further allowing the JD(S) supremo to join hands, which was their junior partner in coalition to call the shots in the government. He left office on 3 February 2006 after the collapse of the Coalition government formed by the Congress (I) due to a defection in the JD(S) engineered by H.D. Kumaraswamy, who succeeded him as Chief Minister, leading a new coalition with the BJP.

During the tenure of H.D. Kumaraswamy, Dharam Singh was the Leader of Opposition in the Karnataka Legislative Assembly. However, in the 2008 state elections he was defeated by a political lightweight, Doddappagouda Patil Naribol of the BJP, by a slim margin of 52 postal votes. In the Lok Sabha elections held in May 2009, he contested the Bidar Lok Sabha constituency and emerged victorious against his former colleague Gurupadappa Nagmarpalli of the BJP by a huge margin of 92,222 votes. However, Dharam Singh had to bite dust in 2014 Lok Sabha election when he lost to Bhagwant Khuba by over a lakh votes, which ended his political career.

== Electoral History ==
=== Lok Sabha ===
Year	Constituency	Party	Votes	%	Opponent	Party	Votes	%	Result	Margin	%
2014	Bidar	INC	3,67,068	38.11	Bhagwanth Khuba	BJP	4,59,290	47.68	Lost	-92,222	-9.57
2009	Bidar	INC	3,37,957	43.37	Gurupadappa Nagmarpalli	BJP	2,98,338	38.29	Won	+39,619	+5.08
1980	Gulbarga	INC(I)	1,74,398	56.20	Vaijnath Patil	JP	56,422	18.18	Won	+1,17,976	+38.02

== Death ==
He died on 27 July 2017 due to cardiac arrest in Bengaluru, aged 80. He was cremated with State Honours and by Rajput Tradition.

== Positions held ==
- 1967: Councillor, Gulbarga City Municipal Council
- 1972–2008: Member of Karnataka Legislative Assembly
- Member of State Backward Classes Commission
- Minister for Urban Development, Karnataka
- Minister for Home & Excise, Karnataka
- Minister for Revenue and Social Welfare
- 1996-1999:KPCC President
- 1999-2004: Minister for Public works, Karnataka
- also PWD minister of Karnataka state
- 2004-2006: Chief Minister of Karnataka
- 2006-2007: Leader of Opposition, Karnataka Legislative Assembly
- 2009-2014: Member Of Parliament

== Criticism and controversy ==
The Karnataka Lokayukta Justice Nitte Santosh Hegde in 2008 has found Dharam Singh and 11 other officials guilty of causing a loss to the State exchequer owing to irregularities in the mining sector. The Lokayukta report indicted him for causing a loss of Rs. 23.22 crore. According to the report, Dharam Singh is at fault for allowing illegal mining in "patta" lands. The Lokayukta had also asked for the amount caused as loss to be recovered from Dharam Singh.

Lok Sabha
Preceded by Narsingrao Suryawanshi	Member of Parliament for Bidar; 2009 – 2014	Succeeded by Bhagwanth Khuba
Political offices
Preceded by S.M. Krishna	Chief Minister of Karnataka; 28 May 2004 – 28 January 2006	Succeeded by H. D. Kumaraswamy
