= Qamar ul Islam =

Indian politician (1948 – 2017)

Member of the Karnataka Legislative Assembly
- In office 2008–2017
- Preceded by: New Constituency
- Succeeded by: Kaneez Fathima
- Constituency: Kalaburagi Uttar
- In office 1978–1983
- Preceded by: Mohamed Ali Mehtab Ali
- Succeeded by: S K Kanta
- Constituency: Kalaburagi
- In office 1989–1996
- Preceded by: S K Kanta
- Succeeded by: Kaiser Mahmood Maniyar
- Constituency: Kalaburagi
- In office 1999–2004
- Preceded by: Kaiser Mahmood Maniyar
- Succeeded by: Constituency abolished
- Constituency: Kalaburagi

Member of Parliament, Lok Sabha
- In office 1996–1998
- Preceded by: B. G. Jawali
- Succeeded by: Basavaraj Patil Sedam
- Constituency: Kalaburagi

Minister for Housing & Labour of Karnataka
- In office 1999–2004
- Constituency: Kalaburagi

Personal details
- Born: 27 January 1948 Kalaburagi
- Died: 18 September 2017 (aged 69) Bangalore
- Party: Indian National Congress
- Spouse: Kaneez Fathima
- Parent: Noorul Islam (Father)

Qamar ul Islam (27 January 1948 – 18 September 2017), was an Indian politician who was the Six-term Member of the Karnataka Legislative assembly, one-term Member of Parliament in the Lok Sabha from Kalaburagi and All India Congress Committee secretary (AICC) in-charge of Kerala. He served as the Cabinet Minister for Housing and Labour, Minister of Municipal Administration, Public Enterprises and Minister of Wakf and the MLA from Kalaburagi-North constituency for the state of Karnataka.

== Early life and education ==
Qamar ul Islam was born to Noorul Islam in Kalaburagi. He completed his Bachelor's in Mechanical Engineering from PDA College of Engineering, Kalaburagi. He first stood in elections in PDA and became the president of the students' union, becoming the first and last Muslim student to hold the post of students' union president in PDA College.

== Political career ==
He was a six-time MLA from the state of Karnataka. He started his political career with the Indian Union Muslim League (IUML) in 1978 and was elected to Karnataka Legislative Assembly during the terms 1978–83, 1989–1994, 1994–96, 1999–2004, 2008–2013 and 2013–2017. He was a Member of Parliament from 1996 to 1998 and also the cabinet minister for Housing and Labour in the administration led by Chief Minister S.M. Krishna from October 1999 to May 2004. He also served as cabinet minister for Municipal administration, Public Enterprises, Minority Development and waqf led by Chief Minister Siddaramaiah cabinet from May 2013 to June 2016.

== Personal life ==
He was professionally an engineer. Dr Qamar ul Islam was passionate about Urdu and he also wrote Shayari sometimes. Throughout his life, he has presided in various Urdu literary programs.

== Positions held ==
#	From	To	Position	Party
1.	1978	1983	MLA (1st term) from Gulbarga: Member of the Public Accounts Committee (1979-1982)	Independent
2.	1989	1994	MLA (2nd term) from Gulbarga: Member of the Estimates Committee (1990-1992); Member of the Public Accounts Committee (1992-1993); Member of the Committee on Petitions (1993-1994)	Muslim League
3.	1994	-	MLA (3rd term) from Gulbarga: Member of the Committee on Housing and Urban Development (1994-1996)	Congress
4.	1996	1998	MP in 11th Lok Sabha from Gulbarga	Janata Dal
5.	1999	2004	MLA (4th term) from Gulbarga	Congress
6.	2008	2013	MLA (5th term) from Gulbarga North	Congress
7.	2013	2017	MLA (6th term) from Gulbarga North	Congress

== Electoral History ==
=== Legislative Assembly ===
Year	Constituency	Party	Votes	%	Opponent	Party	Votes	%	Result	Margin	%
2013	Gulbarga Uttar	INC	50,498	48.17	Nasir Hussain Ustad	KJP	30,377	28.97	Won	+20,121	+19.20
2008	Gulbarga Uttar	INC	54,123	54.26	B. G. Patil	BJP	39,168	39.27	Won	+14,955	+14.99
2004	Gulbarga	INC	78,845	46.00	Dattatraya C. Patil Revoor	BJP	74,645	48.58	Lost	+4,200	-2.58
1999	Gulbarga	INC	79,225	48.84	Dattatraya C. Patil Revoor	BJP	67,446	41.58	Won	+11,779	+7.26
1994	Gulbarga	INL	58,719	44.37	Shashil G. Namoshi	BJP	40,829	30.85	Won	+17,890	+13.52
1989	Gulbarga	MUL	55,801	43.15	S. K. Kanta	JD	51,204	39.60	Won	+4,597	+3.55
1985	Gulbarga	IND	35,794	40.24	S. K. Kanta	JP	36,828	41.40	Lost	-1,034	-1.16
1983	Gulbarga	IND	23,515	33.92	S. K. Kanta	JP	25,503	36.79	Lost	-1,988	-2.87
1978	Gulbarga	IND	18,005	32.80	Ustad Sadat Hussain	JP	17,242	31.41	Won	+763	+1.39

=== Lok Sabha ===
Year	Constituency	Party	Votes	%	Opponent	Party	Votes	%	Result	Margin	%
1998	Gulbarga	JD	1,97,184	26.80	Sedam Baswaraj Patil	BJP	3,28,982	44.72	Lost	-1,31,798	-17.92
1996	Gulbarga	JD	2,03,521	35.90	Sedam Baswaraj Patil	BJP	1,87,976	33.16	Won	+15,545	+2.74

== Death ==
Qamar ul Islam died on 18 September 2017 at a hospital in Bengaluru due to cardiogenic shock and multi-organ failure. He was admitted to the hospital 11 days earlier following cellulitis of the leg. His funeral procession was attended by Karnataka chief minister Siddaramaiah, Mallikarjun Kharge and others.
