= Jevargi Assembly constituency =

Legislative Assembly constituency in Karnataka, India

Coordinates: 17.01°N 76.78°E

Jewargi
- Constituency No. 35 for the Karnataka Legislative Assembly

Constituency details
- Country: India
- Region: South India
- State: Karnataka
- District: Kalaburagi
- Lok Sabha constituency: Gulbarga
- Established: 1951
- Total electors: 239,914
- Reservation: None

Member of Legislative Assembly
- 16th Karnataka Legislative Assembly
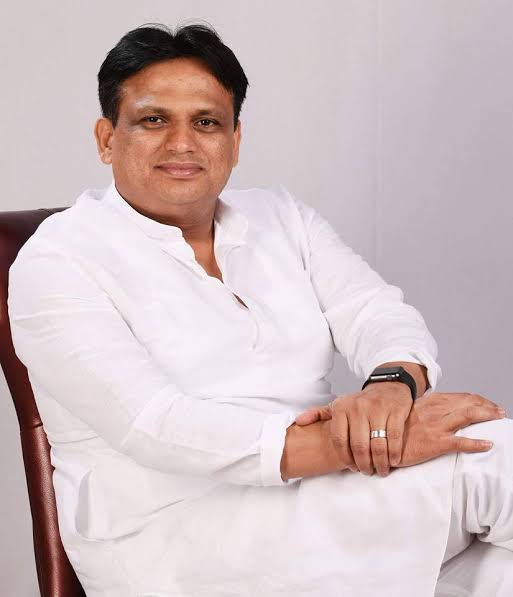
- Incumbent Ajay Singh
- Party: Indian National Congress
- Elected year: 2023
- Preceded by: Doddappagouda S. Patil Naribol

Jevargi Assembly constituency is one of 224 assembly constituencies in Karnataka in India. It is part of Gulbarga Lok Sabha constituency.

== Members of the Legislative Assembly ==
Year	Member	Political party
1952	Sharangouda Sidramayya	Independent politician
1957	Sharangouda Sidramayya	Independent politician
1962	Nilkanthappa Sharnappa	Indian National Congress
1967	S. Siddramgouda	Swatantra Party
1972	O. S. Narayan Singh	Indian National Congress
1978	Dharam Singh	Indian National Congress (I)
1983	Dharam Singh	Indian National Congress
1985	Dharam Singh	Indian National Congress
1989	Dharam Singh	Indian National Congress
1994	Dharam Singh	Indian National Congress
1999	Dharam Singh	Indian National Congress
2004	Dharam Singh	Indian National Congress
2008	Doddappagouda S. Patil	Bharatiya Janata Party
2013	Ajay Singh	Indian National Congress
2018	Ajay Singh	Indian National Congress
2023	Ajay Singh	Indian National Congress

== Election results ==
=== Assembly Election 2023 ===
2023 Karnataka Legislative Assembly election : Jevargi
Party	Candidate	Votes	%	±%
INC	Ajay Singh	70,810	42.30%	▼0.06
JD(S)	Doddappagouda	60,532	36.16%	▲14.09
BJP	Shivaraj	29,564	17.66%	▼14.77
AAP	Vishwanath Reddy	1,167	0.70%	New
NOTA	None of the above	1,146	0.68%	▼0.13
Independent	Vijaykumar	1,124	0.67%	New
Margin of victory		10,278	6.14%	▼3.79
Turnout		168,212	70.11%	▲1.08
Total valid votes		167,404		
Registered electors		239,914		▲2.35
INC hold		Swing	▼0.06	

=== Assembly Election 2018 ===
2018 Karnataka Legislative Assembly election : Jevargi
Party	Candidate	Votes	%	±%
INC	Ajay Singh	68,508	42.36%	▼3.49
BJP	Doddappagowda. S. Patil Naribol	52,452	32.43%	▲11.68
JD(S)	Kedarlingayya Hiremath	35,691	22.07%	▲5.03
NOTA	None of the above	1,310	0.81%	New
Margin of victory		16,056	9.93%	▼15.17
Turnout		161,810	69.03%	▼4.26
Total valid votes		161,746		
Registered electors		234,403		▲18.83
INC hold		Swing	▼3.49	

=== Assembly Election 2013 ===
2013 Karnataka Legislative Assembly election : Jevargi
Party	Candidate	Votes	%	±%
INC	Ajay Singh	67,038	45.85%	▲5.63
BJP	Doddappagowda. S. Patil Naribol	30,338	20.75%	▼19.53
JD(S)	Kedarlingayya Hiremath	24,920	17.04%	▲15.13
KJP	Mallikarjun Dundappa Gouda	11,865	8.12%	New
BSRCP	Baillappa. M. Nelogi	3,066	2.10%	New
Independent	Laxmikant Ramarao Kulkarni	1,956	1.34%	New
CPI	Maheshkumar Rathod	1,638	1.12%	New
Independent	Bheemayya Somayya	938	0.64%	New
BSP	Hussain Patel Ijeri	907	0.62%	▼1.34
Margin of victory		36,700	25.10%	▲25.04
Turnout		144,565	73.29%	▲12.50
Total valid votes		146,207		
Registered electors		197,259		▲3.75
INC gain from BJP		Swing	▲5.57	

=== Assembly Election 2008 ===
2008 Karnataka Legislative Assembly election : Jevargi
Party	Candidate	Votes	%	±%
BJP	Doddappagouda Shivalingappagoud Patil Naribol	46,531	40.28%	▼0.62
INC	Dharam Singh	46,461	40.22%	▼3.30
Independent	Kedarlingayya Hiremath	7,856	6.80%	New
BSP	Appoji Basanna	2,266	1.96%	▲0.19
JD(S)	Basavaraj H. Budihal	2,205	1.91%	▼8.08
Independent	Shivanand	1,883	1.63%	New
Independent	Mahanthayya	1,690	1.46%	New
Independent	S. M. Subhan Hussain	1,327	1.15%	New
Independent	Babasaheb Bheemarao Seri	941	0.81%	New
Margin of victory		70	0.06%	▼2.57
Turnout		115,581	60.79%	▲2.72
Total valid votes		115,509		
Registered electors		190,121		▲6.20
BJP gain from INC		Swing	▼3.24	

=== Assembly Election 2004 ===
2004 Karnataka Legislative Assembly election : Jevargi
Party	Candidate	Votes	%	±%
INC	Dharam Singh	45,235	43.52%	▲0.35
BJP	Shivalingappa Patil Naribol	42,504	40.90%	▼0.01
JD(S)	Mukudappa. K	10,382	9.99%	▲1.11
BSP	Shivalingappa Kinnur Harwal	1,837	1.77%	▼3.50
Independent	Dharanna Itaga	1,703	1.64%	New
SP	Khaja Patel	731	0.70%	New
Kannada Nadu Party	Shanta Arunkumar Patil	665	0.64%	New
Margin of victory		2,731	2.63%	▲0.37
Turnout		103,961	58.07%	▼0.04
Total valid votes		103,929		
Registered electors		179,026		▲14.66
INC hold		Swing	▲0.35	

=== Assembly Election 1999 ===
1999 Karnataka Legislative Assembly election : Jevargi
Party	Candidate	Votes	%	±%
INC	Dharam Singh	37,510	43.17%	▲2.26
BJP	Shivalingappa Patil Naribol	35,549	40.91%	▲30.58
JD(S)	Kedarlingayya Hiremath	7,715	8.88%	New
BSP	Shivalingappa Kinnur Harwal	4,577	5.27%	New
Independent	Balappa Dundappa Irawwagol	1,541	1.77%	New
Margin of victory		1,961	2.26%	▼3.12
Turnout		90,724	58.11%	▲1.60
Total valid votes		86,892		
Rejected ballots		3,697	4.07%	▲0.94
Registered electors		156,132		▲13.37
INC hold		Swing	▲2.26	

=== Assembly Election 1994 ===
1994 Karnataka Legislative Assembly election : Jevargi
Party	Candidate	Votes	%	±%
INC	Dharam Singh	30,840	40.91%	▼6.22
INC	Shivalingappa Patil Naribol	26,785	35.53%	New
BJP	Dharmanna Doddamani	7,790	10.33%	▲9.07
JD	Abdul Hameed	7,307	9.69%	▼6.72
Independent	Shivaji Saibannappa	1,432	1.90%	New
Independent	Patil Shivalingappa Fouda Kondguli	672	0.89%	New
Independent	Madivalappa. B. Mudda	556	0.74%	New
Margin of victory		4,055	5.38%	▼12.50
Turnout		77,820	56.51%	▲0.26
Total valid votes		75,382		
Rejected ballots		2,438	3.13%	▼2.73
Registered electors		137,719		▲11.76
INC hold		Swing	▼6.22	

=== Assembly Election 1989 ===
1989 Karnataka Legislative Assembly election : Jevargi
Party	Candidate	Votes	%	±%
INC	Dharam Singh	30,751	47.13%	▼1.02
JP	Appasaheb Baswantrao Patil	19,087	29.25%	New
JD	Channbasappa Dandappa Kulger	10,705	16.41%	New
Kranti Sabha	Pradhani Shankrappa	1,494	2.29%	New
BJP	Shivalingappa	823	1.26%	▼0.76
Independent	Shivasharnappa	793	1.22%	New
RPI	Ramlingappa	619	0.95%	New
Independent	Manjit Singh Awatarsingh	501	0.77%	New
Independent	Maheboob Ali Khajasab	473	0.72%	New
Margin of victory		11,664	17.88%	▲9.86
Turnout		69,307	56.25%	▼3.55
Total valid votes		65,246		
Rejected ballots		4,061	5.86%	▲2.78
Registered electors		123,223		▲24.80
INC hold		Swing	▼1.02	

=== Assembly Election 1985 ===
1985 Karnataka Legislative Assembly election : Jevargi
Party	Candidate	Votes	%	±%
INC	Dharam Singh	27,548	48.15%	▼6.19
JP	Channabassappa Kulageri	22,957	40.12%	▲5.89
Independent	Khajapatel Afkhanpatel	2,179	3.81%	New
Independent	Mahadevappa. T. Patil	1,671	2.92%	New
BJP	Dharamaveer Raghuvansi	1,156	2.02%	▼2.60
Independent	Maheboobbi Ali	774	1.35%	New
Independent	Y. S. Nelogi	445	0.78%	New
Margin of victory		4,591	8.02%	▼12.10
Turnout		59,038	59.80%	▲1.21
Total valid votes		57,217		
Rejected ballots		1,821	3.08%	▲0.30
Registered electors		98,734		▲14.71
INC hold		Swing	▼6.19	

=== Assembly Election 1983 ===
1983 Karnataka Legislative Assembly election : Jevargi
Party	Candidate	Votes	%	±%
INC	Dharam Singh	26,643	54.34%	▲41.58
JP	Hanumantharaya Revansiddappa	16,781	34.23%	▲3.71
Independent	Shivasharnappa Mantappa Jamberal	3,339	6.81%	New
BJP	Abdul Wahed Jahangirdar	2,265	4.62%	New
Margin of victory		9,862	20.12%	▼3.49
Turnout		50,430	58.59%	▼4.73
Total valid votes		49,028		
Rejected ballots		1,402	2.78%	▼1.08
Registered electors		86,071		▲6.69
INC gain from INC(I)		Swing	▲0.21	

=== Assembly Election 1978 ===
1978 Karnataka Legislative Assembly election : Jevargi
Party	Candidate	Votes	%	±%
INC(I)	Dharam Singh	26,584	54.13%	New
JP	Mallappa Malkappa Sahu Alur	14,989	30.52%	New
INC	Annarya Gouda Shivasharanappa Gouda Patil	6,266	12.76%	▼45.23
Independent	Shivasharanappa Mahantappagouda Jemnberat	1,273	2.59%	New
Margin of victory		11,595	23.61%	▲4.93
Turnout		51,085	63.32%	▲12.36
Total valid votes		49,112		
Rejected ballots		1,973	3.86%	▲3.86
Registered electors		80,673		▲11.75
INC(I) gain from INC		Swing	▼3.86	

=== Assembly Election 1972 ===
1972 Mysore State Legislative Assembly election : Jevargi
Party	Candidate	Votes	%	±%
INC	O. S. Narayan Singh	20,500	57.99%	▲21.54
INC(O)	Mahadevappa Yeshwantrao	13,896	39.31%	New
ABJS	R. R. Kulkarni Baba Rao	953	2.70%	New
Margin of victory		6,604	18.68%	▲0.39
Turnout		36,785	50.96%	▼1.87
Total valid votes		35,349		
Registered electors		72,191		▲18.42
INC gain from SWA		Swing	▲3.26	

=== Assembly Election 1967 ===
1967 Mysore State Legislative Assembly election : Jevargi
Party	Candidate	Votes	%	±%
SWA	S. Siddramgouda	16,340	54.73%	▲6.11
INC	N. Sharnappa	10,881	36.45%	▼14.93
CPI	D. Anantrao	2,633	8.82%	New
Margin of victory		5,459	18.29%	▲15.54
Turnout		32,204	52.83%	▲3.38
Total valid votes		29,854		
Registered electors		60,962		▲19.34
SWA gain from INC		Swing	▲3.35	

=== Assembly Election 1962 ===
1962 Mysore State Legislative Assembly election : Jevargi
Party	Candidate	Votes	%	±%
INC	Nilkanthappa Sharnappa	12,251	51.38%	▲10.24
SWA	K. Channabasappa Dandappa	11,595	48.62%	New
Margin of victory		656	2.75%	▲2.18
Turnout		25,263	49.45%	▲12.38
Total valid votes		23,846		
Registered electors		51,084		▲7.83
INC gain from Independent		Swing	▲9.67	

=== Assembly Election 1957 ===
1957 Mysore State Legislative Assembly election : Jevargi
Party	Candidate	Votes	%	±%
Independent	Sharangouda Sidramayya	7,326	41.71%	New
INC	Rudrappa Nagappa	7,226	41.14%	▲15.72
CPI	Srinivas Rao	3,011	17.14%	New
Margin of victory		100	0.57%	▼48.60
Turnout		17,563	37.07%	▲15.47
Total valid votes		17,563		
Registered electors		47,373		▼18.57
Independent hold		Swing	▼32.87	

=== Assembly Election 1952 ===
1952 Hyderabad State Legislative Assembly election : Andole Jewargi
Party	Candidate	Votes	%	±%
Independent	Sharangouda Sidramayya	9,370	74.58%	New
INC	Dattatrya Rao	3,193	25.42%	New
Margin of victory		6,177	49.17%	
Turnout		12,563	21.60%	
Total valid votes		12,563		
Registered electors		58,175		
Independent win (new seat)				

== See also ==
- List of constituencies of the Karnataka Legislative Assembly
