= Vijay Singh (Karnataka politician) =

Indian politician

Member of the Karnataka Legislative Council
- In office 2015–2021

Personal details
- Party: Indian National Congress
- Parent: Dharam Singh (father)
- Profession: politician, Social Worker and Businessmen

Vijay Singh is an Indian politician affiliated with the Indian National Congress Party. He was a candidate in the 2015 Karnataka MLC elections and was elected. He also contested the Karnataka Legislative Assembly from the Basavakalyan Assembly constituency in 2023 but was defeated by Sharanu Salagar of the Bharatiya Janata Party. In 2020, he sought the party ticket for the Basavakalyan Assembly constituency by-election.
