= Gulbarga Assembly constituency =

Former Assembly constituency in Karnataka, India

Coordinates: 17.33°N 76.83°E

Gulbarga
- Former constituency for the Karnataka Legislative Assembly

Constituency details
- Country: India
- Region: South India
- State: Karnataka
- Division: Gulbarga
- District: Gulbarga
- Lok Sabha constituency: Gulbarga
- Established: 1951
- Abolished: 2008
- Reservation: None

Gulbarga Assembly constituency Vidhan Sabha seat was one of the constituencies in Karnataka state assembly in India until 2008 when it was made defunct. It was part of Gulbarga Lok Sabha constituency.

== Members of the Legislative Assembly ==
Election	Member	Party
1952	Mohd. Ali	Indian National Congress
1957	Mohammed Ali Mehtab Ali	Indian National Congress
1962	Gangadhar Namoshi	Communist Party of India
1967	Mohammed Ali Mehtab Ali	Indian National Congress
1972	Mohammed Ali Mehtab Ali	Indian National Congress
1978	Qamar ul Islam	Independent politician
1983	S. K. Kanta	Janata Party
1985	S. K. Kanta	Janata Party
1989	Qamar ul Islam	All-India Muslim League
1994	Qamar ul Islam	Indian National League
1996 By-election (Note: Resigned on 27/05/1996)	Kaiser Mahmood Maniyar	Janata Dal
1999	Qamar ul Islam	Indian National Congress
2004	Chandrashekar D. Patil Revoor	Bharatiya Janata Party

== Election results ==
=== Assembly Election 2004 ===
2004 Karnataka Legislative Assembly election : Gulbarga
Party	Candidate	Votes	%	±%
BJP	Chandrashekar D. Patil Revoor	78,845	48.59%	▲7.01
INC	Qamar ul Islam	74,645	46.00%	▼2.84
JD(S)	Mohd Fahmeed Khan	2,728	1.68%	▼0.37
BSP	Syed Khurshied Hussain	1,646	1.01%	New
Independent	Sabir Ghowri	1,106	0.68%	New
Margin of victory		4,200	2.59%	▼4.67
Turnout		162,438	60.78%	▼1.10
Total valid votes		162,267		
Registered electors		267,245		▼0.13
BJP gain from INC		Swing	▼0.25	

=== Assembly Election 1999 ===
1999 Karnataka Legislative Assembly election : Gulbarga
Party	Candidate	Votes	%	±%
INC	Qamar ul Islam	79,225	48.84%	▲45.06
BJP	Chandrashekar D. Patil Revoor	67,446	41.58%	▲22.87
JD(U)	S. K. Kanta	11,704	7.22%	New
JD(S)	Ashfaq Chulbul	3,317	2.05%	New
Margin of victory		11,779	7.26%	▲1.52
Turnout		165,583	61.88%	▲9.49
Total valid votes		162,197		
Rejected ballots		3,222	1.95%	▲0.96
Registered electors		267,585		▲9.96
INC gain from JD		Swing	▲10.08	

=== Assembly By-election 1996 ===
1996 Karnataka Legislative Assembly by-election : Gulbarga
Party	Candidate	Votes	%	±%
JD	Kaiser Mahmood Maniyar	48,923	38.76%	▲21.21
SP	S. K. Kanta	41,684	33.03%	New
BJP	Somashekhar. C. Devani	23,610	18.71%	▼12.14
BSP	S. H. Katti	6,627	5.25%	New
INC	C. B. Patil Okaly	4,769	3.78%	▼1.33
Margin of victory		7,239	5.74%	▼7.78
Turnout		127,481	52.39%	▼9.49
Total valid votes		126,219		
Rejected ballots		1,262	0.99%	▼1.16
Registered electors		243,343		▲11.32
JD gain from INL		Swing	▼5.61	

=== Assembly Election 1994 ===
1994 Karnataka Legislative Assembly election : Gulbarga
Party	Candidate	Votes	%	±%
INL	Qamar ul Islam	58,719	44.37%	New
BJP	Shashil. G. Namoshi	40,829	30.85%	▲27.17
JD	S. K. Kanta	23,229	17.55%	▼22.05
INC	Ustad Sadat Hussain	6,762	5.11%	▼4.69
Margin of victory		17,890	13.52%	▲9.96
Turnout		135,265	61.88%	▼7.01
Total valid votes		132,351		
Rejected ballots		2,914	2.15%	▼2.92
Registered electors		218,601		▲10.55
INL gain from AIML		Swing	▲1.22	

=== Assembly Election 1989 ===
1989 Karnataka Legislative Assembly election : Gulbarga
Party	Candidate	Votes	%	±%
AIML	Qamar ul Islam	55,801	43.15%	New
JD	S. K. Kanta	51,204	39.60%	New
INC	M. A. Azeem	12,675	9.80%	▼3.18
BJP	S. Shankar	4,758	3.68%	▲1.68
JP	R. K. Niggudagi	2,624	2.03%	New
Margin of victory		4,597	3.56%	▲2.40
Turnout		136,222	68.89%	▲1.96
Total valid votes		129,310		
Rejected ballots		6,912	5.07%	▲3.58
Registered electors		197,745		▲46.56
AIML gain from JP		Swing	▲1.75	

=== Assembly Election 1985 ===
1985 Karnataka Legislative Assembly election : Gulbarga
Party	Candidate	Votes	%	±%
JP	S. K. Kanta	36,828	41.40%	▲4.61
Independent	Qamar ul Islam	35,794	40.24%	New
INC	M. Abdul Qadar Saradgi	11,551	12.98%	▼3.29
BJP	Dhammurkar Manohar	1,777	2.00%	▼4.53
LKD	Veeranna Timmaji	1,069	1.20%	▼2.75
Independent	Shankar Rao Kodla	618	0.69%	New
Margin of victory		1,034	1.16%	▼1.71
Turnout		90,309	66.93%	▲3.10
Total valid votes		88,961		
Rejected ballots		1,348	1.49%	▼1.05
Registered electors		134,928		▲21.08
JP hold		Swing	▲4.61	

=== Assembly Election 1983 ===
1983 Karnataka Legislative Assembly election : Gulbarga
Party	Candidate	Votes	%	±%
JP	S. K. Kanta	25,503	36.79%	▲5.38
Independent	Quamarul Islam Noorul Islam	23,515	33.92%	New
INC	Sadat Hussain Shaik Hussain	11,278	16.27%	▲12.62
BJP	Anant Sharma Jaitithacharya	4,527	6.53%	New
LKD	Sanganna Halkai	2,736	3.95%	New
Independent	Gundappa Revappa	820	1.18%	New
Margin of victory		1,988	2.87%	▲1.48
Turnout		71,129	63.83%	▲2.95
Total valid votes		69,319		
Rejected ballots		1,810	2.54%	▼0.05
Registered electors		111,441		▲20.39
JP gain from Independent		Swing	▲3.99	

=== Assembly Election 1978 ===
1978 Karnataka Legislative Assembly election : Gulbarga
Party	Candidate	Votes	%	±%
Independent	Qamar ul Islam	18,005	32.80%	New
JP	Ustad Sadat Hussain	17,242	31.41%	New
INC(I)	Iqbal Ahmed Saradgi	12,476	22.73%	New
CPI(M)	Gangadhar Namoshi	3,527	6.42%	▼12.41
INC	Mohammed Ali Mehtab Ali	2,002	3.65%	▼44.32
Independent	Sharangouda Inamdar	627	1.14%	New
RPI(K)	Paswaraj. S. Kattimani	625	1.14%	New
Margin of victory		763	1.39%	▼21.89
Turnout		56,356	60.88%	▼0.57
Total valid votes		54,899		
Rejected ballots		1,457	2.59%	▲2.59
Registered electors		92,567		▲16.90
Independent gain from INC		Swing	▼15.17	

=== Assembly Election 1972 ===
1972 Mysore State Legislative Assembly election : Gulbarga
Party	Candidate	Votes	%	±%
INC	Mohammed Ali Mehtab Ali	22,657	47.97%	▼5.99
ABJS	A. Sharma Jaitirthachary	11,663	24.70%	▲18.53
CPI(M)	Gangadhar Namoshi	8,892	18.83%	▼21.04
Independent	B. Shamsunder. B. Manikam	2,382	5.04%	New
INC(O)	Mohd. Khurshid Khan	724	1.53%	New
SSP	V. P. Deulgoankar	674	1.43%	New
Margin of victory		10,994	23.28%	▲9.19
Turnout		48,659	61.45%	▲9.58
Total valid votes		47,228		
Registered electors		79,184		▲18.72
INC hold		Swing	▼5.99	

=== Assembly Election 1967 ===
1967 Mysore State Legislative Assembly election : Gulbarga
Party	Candidate	Votes	%	±%
INC	Mohammed Ali Mehtab Ali	17,694	53.96%	▲12.67
CPI(M)	Gangadhar Basappa Namoshi	13,075	39.87%	New
ABJS	M. Shivalingayya	2,024	6.17%	New
Margin of victory		4,619	14.09%	▲1.66
Turnout		34,594	51.87%	▼0.41
Total valid votes		32,793		
Registered electors		66,698		▲26.27
INC gain from CPI		Swing	▲0.24	

=== Assembly Election 1962 ===
1962 Mysore State Legislative Assembly election : Gulbarga
Party	Candidate	Votes	%	±%
CPI	Gangadhar Namoshi	14,208	53.72%	▲28.05
INC	Mohammed Ali Mehtab Ali	10,920	41.29%	▼3.54
PSP	Malleshayya Swamy Shivalingayya	1,003	3.79%	▼7.69
Socialist Party (India)	Viranna Chanamallappa	318	1.20%	New
Margin of victory		3,288	12.43%	▼6.73
Turnout		27,617	52.28%	▲10.09
Total valid votes		26,449		
Registered electors		52,823		▲12.73
CPI gain from INC		Swing	▲8.89	

=== Assembly Election 1957 ===
1957 Mysore State Legislative Assembly election : Gulbarga
Party	Candidate	Votes	%	±%
INC	Mohammed Ali Mehtab Ali	8,864	44.83%	▼13.49
CPI	Gangadhar Basappa Namoshi	5,075	25.67%	New
Independent	Mohamed Abdur Raheem Saheb Maqdoom Saheb	3,563	18.02%	New
PSP	Venkatrao Pandurangrao	2,270	11.48%	New
Margin of victory		3,789	19.16%	▼14.05
Turnout		19,772	42.19%	▲9.57
Total valid votes		19,772		
Registered electors		46,860		▲1.62
INC hold		Swing	▼13.49	

=== Assembly Election 1952 ===
1952 Hyderabad State Legislative Assembly election : Gulbarga
Party	Candidate	Votes	%	±%
INC	Mohd. Ali	8,772	58.32%	New
Socialist Party (India)	Sadasivappa	3,777	25.11%	New
PDF	Shantappa Sangappa Herur	2,611	17.36%	New
Independent	Dattarya Prasad	1,740	11.57%	New
Independent	Hannulal Harisingh	439	2.92%	New
HMS	Narayan Manik Killy	314	2.09%	New
Margin of victory		4,995	33.21%	
Turnout		15,042	32.62%	
Total valid votes		15,042		
Registered electors		46,114		
INC win (new seat)				

== See also ==
- List of constituencies of the Karnataka Legislative Assembly
