= Buddha Vihar, Kalaburagi =

Buddhist center in Karnataka, India

Buddha Vihara
- ಬುದ್ಧ ವಿಹಾರ
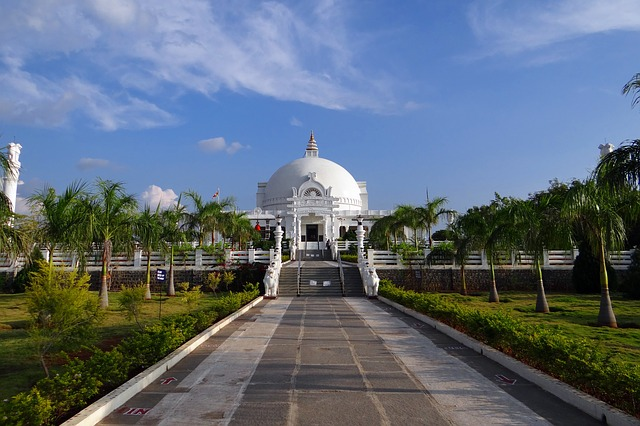
- Buddha Vihar, Kalaburagi

- Location within India Location within Karnataka

Location
- Location: Kalaburagi, Karnataka, India
- Coordinates: 17.306803°N 76.892781°E

Architecture
- Completed: 7 January 2007

Buddha Vihara is a Buddhist temple and spiritual center in Kalaburagi, Karnataka, India.

== History ==
Buddha Vihara is place for Buddhists. Situated in Kalaburagi, a city in the Indian state of Karnataka. It started on 7 January 2007. The Buddha Vihar complex blends architectural features of eminent Buddhist centers of Sanchi, Sarnath, Ajanta and Nagpur and has been constructed conforming to traditional Buddhist architecture.
