= Kaneez Fathima =

Indian politician

Kaneez Fatima

Member of the Karnataka Legislative Assembly
- Incumbent
- Assumed office 2018
- Preceded by: Qamar ul Islam
- Constituency: Gulbarga Uttar

Personal details
- Born: 21 August 1959 (age 67) Hyderabad, Andhra Pradesh, (present-day Telangana) India
- Party: Indian National Congress
- Spouse: Qamar ul Islam

Kaneez Fatima (Urdu: کنیز فاطمہ) is an Indian politician and 2 time MLA from the Gulbarga North constituency of the Karnataka Legislative Assembly. She was the wife of a former minister, the late Qamar-ul-Islam who was also MLA from the same constituency in 2013.

She was appointed chairman for Karnataka Silk Industries Corporation Limited (KSIC) on 26 January 2024.

== Constituency ==
She represents Gulbarga Uttar (Vidhana Sabha constituency) of the Karnataka Legislative Assembly.

== Political career ==
Fatima is a member of Indian National Congress (INC) political party. After the death of Dr Qamar ul Islam, Fatima had initially refused to contest but was persuaded by Siddaramaiah, Mallikarjun Kharge and G.Parameshwar. Many Gulbarga leaders from Congress including Priyank Kharge, Ajay Singh,Dr Syed Mustafa Al Hussaini, Wahaj Baba , ex-HKE President Basavaraj Bhimalli, etc. supported her. She won the election against Nasir Hussain Ustad of JD(s) and Chandrakanth Patil of BJP by 5,940 votes.

=== CAA Protest ===
A massive protest, the largest in North Karnataka, took place in the town of Kalaburagi against the Citizenship Amendment Act (CAA). Around 15,000 people gathered for a protest march and came out defying the Section 144 notification that was imposed on the entire state of Karnataka. Fatima was the major catalyst in mobilising citizens. All local Congress Corporators reportedly came out in support of the protest.

== Position held ==
#	From	To	Position
1.	2018	2023	MLA (1st term) from Gulbarga
2.	2023	Present	MLA (2nd term) from Gulbarga

== Controversy ==
Fatima had purchased 22 acres of agricultural land near Gulbarga. S K Kantha, the former minister, had filed a complaint alleging that the purchase was illegal and violated Karnataka Land Reforms Act, 1961. The Act prohibits the purchase of agricultural land by any person other than an agriculturist. The Gulbarga tahsildar, in his report to the Assistant Commissioner, stated that Qamar ul Islam runs schools and owns commercial complexes and hence the income of Fatima exceeded Rs two lakh per annum. The Assistant Commissioner set aside the purchase of land by Fatima with an observation that the purchaser had violated the provisions of the Karnataka Land Reforms Act. He has directed the tahsildar to take over the land and mention Karnataka Government as the owner of the land.
