= Gulbarga Uttar Assembly constituency =

Constituency in Karnataka State, India

Coordinates: 17.37°N 76.83°E

Gulbarga Uttar
- Constituency No. 45 for the Karnataka Legislative Assembly

Constituency details
- Country: India
- Region: South India
- State: Karnataka
- District: Kalaburagi
- Lok Sabha constituency: Gulbarga
- Established: 2008
- Total electors: 307,091
- Reservation: None

Member of Legislative Assembly
- 16th Karnataka Legislative Assembly
- Incumbent Kaneez Fathima
- Party: Indian National Congress
- Elected year: 2023
- Preceded by: Qamarul Islam

Gulbarga Uttar Assembly constituency is one of 224 assembly constituencies in Karnataka in India. It is part of Gulbarga Lok Sabha constituency. The major communities residing in this constituency are Muslims, Lingayats and Dalits, with Muslims in 52% majority. The constituency is known for its historical and cultural significance, with several ancient temples and monuments located in the area.

== Members of the Legislative Assembly ==
Election	Member	Party
2008	Qamar ul Islam	Indian National Congress
2013	Qamar ul Islam	Indian National Congress
2018	Kaneez Fathima	Indian National Congress
2023	Kaneez Fathima	Indian National Congress

== Election results ==
=== Assembly Election 2023 ===
2023 Karnataka Legislative Assembly election : Gulbarga Uttar
Party	Candidate	Votes	%	±%
INC	Kaneez Fathima	80,973	45.28	▲1.99
BJP	Chandrakant B. Patil (Chandu Patil)	78,261	43.76	▲4.47
JD(S)	Nasir Hussain Ustad	17,114	9.57	▼0.14
NOTA	None of the above	934	0.52	▼0.23
Margin of victory		2,712	1.52	▼2.48
Turnout		179,503	58.45	▲4.18
Total valid votes		178,845		
Registered electors		307,091		▲11.96
INC hold		Swing	▲1.99	

=== Assembly Election 2018 ===
2018 Karnataka Legislative Assembly election : Gulbarga Uttar
Party	Candidate	Votes	%	±%
INC	Kaneez Fathima	64,311	43.29	▲5.15
BJP	Chandrakant B. Patil (Chandu Patil)	58,371	39.29	▲25.21
JD(S)	Nasir Hussain Ustad	14,422	9.71	▲8.81
Independent	Wahaj Baba	7,166	4.82	New
NOTA	None of the above	1,116	0.75	New
Margin of victory		5,940	4.00	▼11.20
Turnout		148,851	54.27	▲4.04
Total valid votes		148,552		
Registered electors		274,281		▲31.41
INC hold		Swing	▲5.15	

=== Assembly Election 2013 ===
2013 Karnataka Legislative Assembly election : Gulbarga Uttar
Party	Candidate	Votes	%	±%
INC	Qamar ul Islam	50,498	38.14	▼16.12
KJP	Nasir Hussain Ustad	30,377	22.95	New
BJP	Rajgopal Reddy	18,642	14.08	▼25.19
JD(S)	Syed Zafar Hussain	1,189	0.90	▼0.77
Margin of victory		20,121	15.20	▲0.21
Turnout		104,843	50.23	▼0.47
Total valid votes		132,385		
Registered electors		208,722		▲6.04
INC hold		Swing	▼16.12	

=== Assembly Election 2008 ===
2008 Karnataka Legislative Assembly election : Gulbarga Uttar
Party	Candidate	Votes	%	±%
INC	Qamar ul Islam	54,123	54.26	New
BJP	B. G. Patil	39,168	39.27	New
BSP	Shoukat Ali	1,683	1.69	New
JD(S)	Suresh Mahagaonkar	1,661	1.67	New
Independent	Hameed Pasha Sarmast	1,591	1.59	New
Margin of victory		14,955	14.99	
Turnout		99,799	50.70	
Total valid votes		99,752		
Registered electors		196,837		
INC win (new seat)				

== See also ==
- List of constituencies of the Karnataka Legislative Assembly
- Gulbarga Assembly constituency
