= Mahadevappa Rampure =

Indian Politician (1920 - 1973)

Deputy Chairman of the Mysuru Legislative Council
- In office 26 December 1956 – 31 March 1957

Member of Parliament, Lok Sabha
- In office 5 April 1957 – 27 December 1970
- Prime Minister: Jawaharlal Nehru Lal Bahadur Shastri Indira Gandhi
- Preceded by: Swami Ramanand Tirtha
- Succeeded by: Dharamrao Sharanappa Afzalpur
- Constituency: Gulbarga

Member of the Mysuru Legislative Council
- In office 1956 – 05 April 1957

Personal details
- Born: 1 August 1920 Kumbhari
- Died: 6 February 1973 (aged 52) Bengaluru
- Parents: Yashwantappa Rampure (father); Gurubai Rampure (mother)
- Profession: Agriculturist, Businessman and Social worker

Mahadevappa Yashwantappa Rampure (1920-1973) was an Indian politician and freedom fighter who served as the Deputy Chairman of the Mysuru Legislative Council from 26 December 1956 to 31 March 1957. He was Member of the Lok Sabha for Kalaburagi Lok Sabha constituency from 5 April 1957 to 27 December 1970. He was the founder of Hyderabad Karnataka Education Society (H.K.E. Society).

== Early life and family ==
Mahadevappa Rampure was born on August 1, 1920, in Kumbari, Sholapur. Yashwantappa Rampure was his father. Completed his education from H.D. High School, Sholapur.

== Personal life ==
Mahadevappa Rampure was married to Smt. Taradevi and the couple had Five Son's and Three Daughters. He was Educationalist, Agriculturist, Businessman and Social worker by profession.

== Political career ==
Mahadevappa Rampure was a member and the Deputy Chairman of Mysore Legislative Council in 1956. He was a member of the Second, Third and Fourth Lok Sabha. He was also a member of the Radical Democratic Party. He was the General Secretary of Gulbarga District Congress for 8 years.

== Positions held ==
Year	Position Held
1956	Member and Deputy Chairman, Legislative Council, Mysore.
1957	Member of Parliament in 2nd Lok Sabha (5 April 1957 – 31 March 1962)
	Member of Board of Governors at Regional Engineering College in Warangal.; Member of National Railway Users' Consultative Committee.; Member of Hyderabad Pradesh Congress Working Committee.; Member of Mysore Pradesh Congress Working Committee.; Member of Election Committee, Hyderabad Karnataka Congress Committee.; Member of Indian Red Cross Society Gulbarga; Member of Karnataka University Senate and Syndicate, Dharwar.; Secretary of Bharat Scout & Guides, Gulbarga District Association.; Founder President of M.S.K. Mills, Rashtriya Sabha Gulbarga.; Vice-president, Shahabad, Cement Factory Majdur Sabha, Shahabad
1962	Member of Parliament in 3rd Lok Sabha (2 April 1962 – 3 March 1967)
1971	Member of Parliament in 4th Lok Sabha (4 March 1967 – 27 December 1970)

=== Social activities ===
Designation	Position Held
Founder-President	Hyderabad Karnataka Education Society, Gulbarga.
Founder-President	Seth Shankarlal Lohoti Law College, Gulbarga.
Founder-President	Engineering College, Gulbarga.
Founder-President	M.A.M. Hostel, Gulbarga.
Founder-President	Bhoomraddi Arts and Science College, Bidar.
Founder-President	Medical College, Gulbarga.
Founder-President	Smt V.G., College for Women, Gulbarga.
Founder-President	S.S. Maragol College, Shahabad, Distt. Gulbarga.
Founder-President	Muluk Sheriar Irani Institute of Science, Gulbarga;
Founder - Secretary	S. B. High School, Gulbarga
Founder - Secretary	S. B. Arts and Science-College, Gulbarga.
Founder - Vice Chairman	S.B. Commerce College, Gulbarga

== Social activities ==
Organizing study circles and Trade Unions.

== Death ==
Died due to a heart attack on Feb 6, 1973 in Bangalore.
