= Mina Radhakrishnan =

- Education: Cornell University
- Occupations: Entrepreneur and product manager
- Known for: Co-founder of :Different

Mina Radhakrishnan is an entrepreneur and product manager. She is currently a co-founder of :Different. She was previously an entrepreneur in residence at Redpoint Ventures, a special adviser to Cowboy Ventures and worked at Uber as their first product manager, sharing the patent for Uber's surge pricing verification system.

== Education ==
Radhakrishnan graduated from Cornell University in 2004 with degrees in computer science and cognitive science.

== Career ==
Radhakrishnan began her career as a business analyst for Goldman Sachs. She later joined Google as a member of the Associate Product Management program, and then ModCloth as one of their first product managers. She was the first product manager at Uber and later ran the company's product team for three years, leading initiatives such as new driver onboarding and the addition of other types of car services. She is one of five inventors who jointly hold Uber's 2013 patent on surge pricing. She has spoken at the TwilioCon and #ProductSF conference, and been interviewed on CBS News. She served as an entrepreneur in residence at startup investment firm Redpoint Ventures, and as special adviser to Cowboy Ventures. She is currently a board advisor at Airtasker, an advisor at Antler and also advises and mentors other companies.

In 2019 it was announced that Radhakrishnan had co-founded and raised a second round of capital for :Different a property-tech startup involved in property management in Australia with a team of 32 people.
