= Sharnbasva University =

University in Karnataka, India

Coordinates: 17°19′46″N 76°49′24″E

- Type: Private
- Established: 2017
- Affiliations: UGC
- Chancellor: Poojya Sharanbaswappa Appa
- Vice-Chancellor: Niranjan Nisty
- Location: Vidya Nagar, Kalaburagi, Karnataka, India
- Website: www.sharnbasvauniversity.edu.in

Sharnbasva University is a private university in Kalaburagi, Karnataka. It is the first private university to be established in the Kalyana-Karnataka region.

== History ==
It was established in 2017.

== Campus ==
The university campus is located on 60 acres of land on the outskirts of Gulbarga.
