= Sharana Basaveshwara Temple =

Temple in Karnataka, India

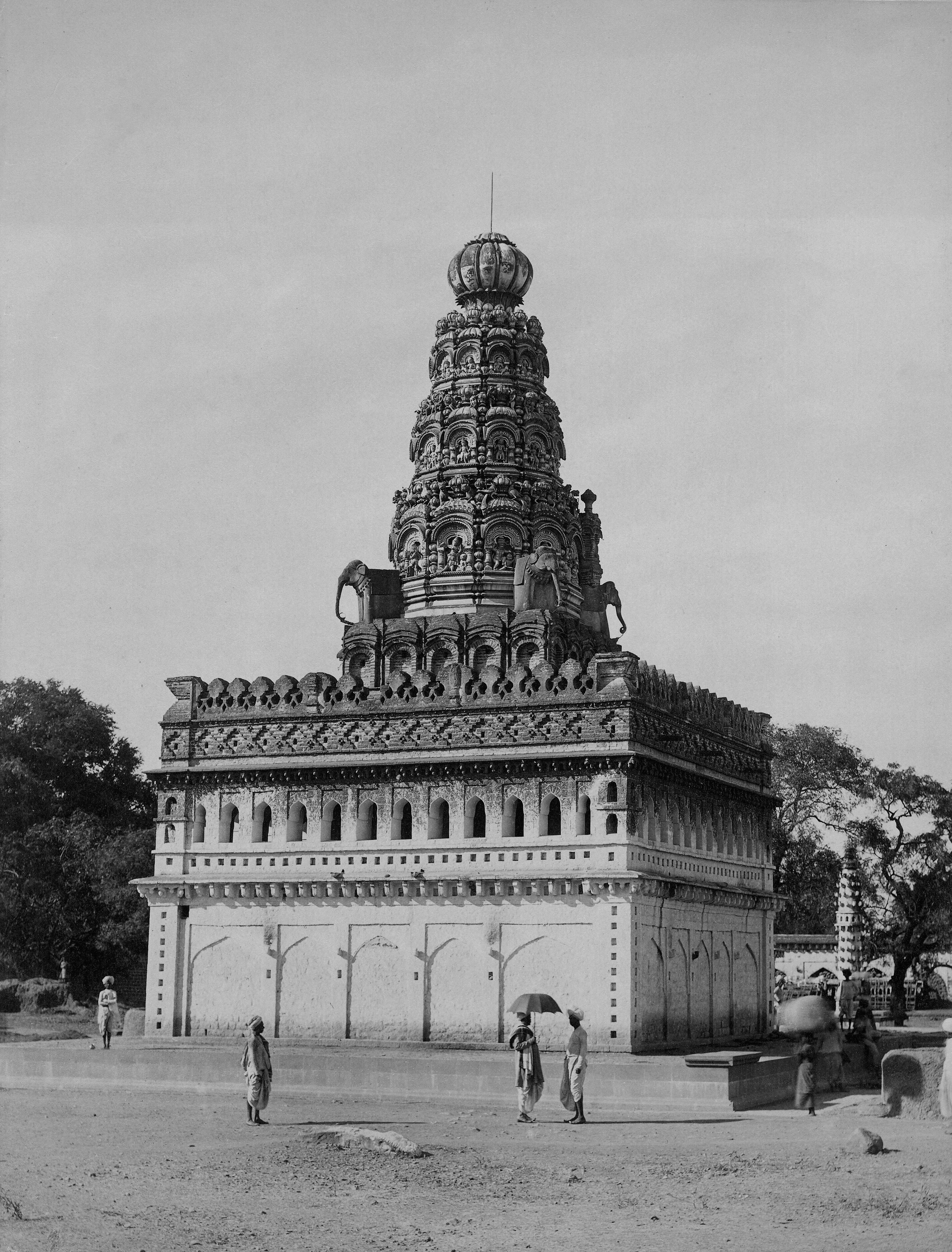
- Sharana Basaveshwara Temple between December 1887- February 1888.

Religion
- Affiliation: Hinduism
- District: Kalaburagi
- Deity: Sharana Basaveshwara
- Festivals: Annual Jatra and Car festival

Location
- Location: Kalaburgi
- State: Karnataka
- Country: India
- Interactive map of Sharana Basaveshwara Temple

Sharana Basaveshwara Temple is a shrine at Kalaburgi (Gulbarga), an ancient town in the north-eastern part of Karnataka.

== History ==
The temple is dedicated to a Lingayat religious teacher and philosopher, Shri Sharanabassappa, a Lingayat saint of the 12th century known for his Dasoha (Giving is earning) and Kayaka — advanced the Karma doctrine "You have the right to perform the work assigned to you. You have no rights to 'demand' the fruits of your labor" philosophy.

The temple houses the Samadhi of Sharana Basaveshwara at the center called the garbha gudi. It also has a lake adjacent to it which attracts many devotees and tourists.

== Jatra and Chariot festival ==
People from across the country and abroad cutting across communal lines will converge on the sprawling temple complex to witness the historic car festival. On the occasion, the people will also have a glimpse of the silver plate (Prasada Battalu) used by the saint. The Prasada Battalu, which is displayed once in a year during the festival, would be shown to the devotees. Along with the Prasada Battalu, the devotees will get a chance to have a look at the Linga Karadige (the cover used for keeping the Linga) made in sandalwood and used by Sharanabasaveshwara. People, particularly farmers from the region, continue the practice of donating a portion of their harvest to the temple for providing free food to pilgrims visiting the temple.

== Gallery ==
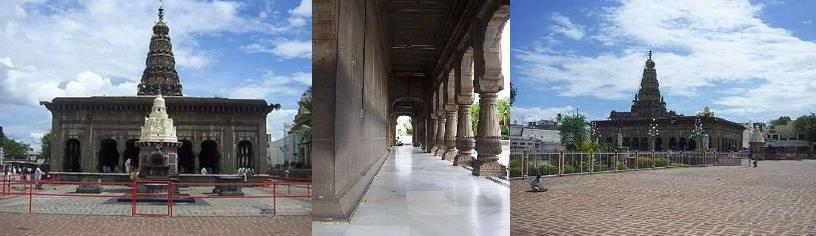

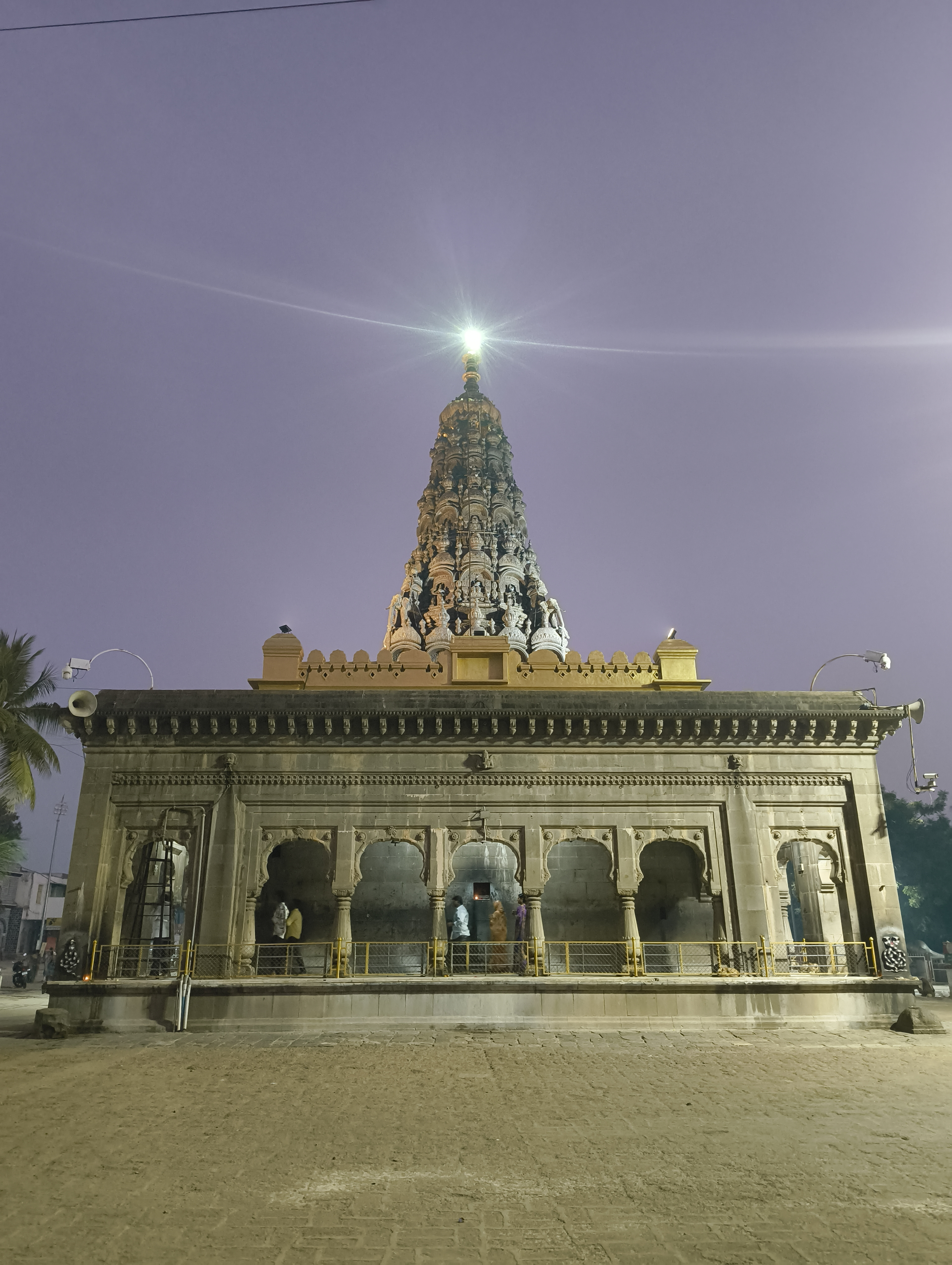

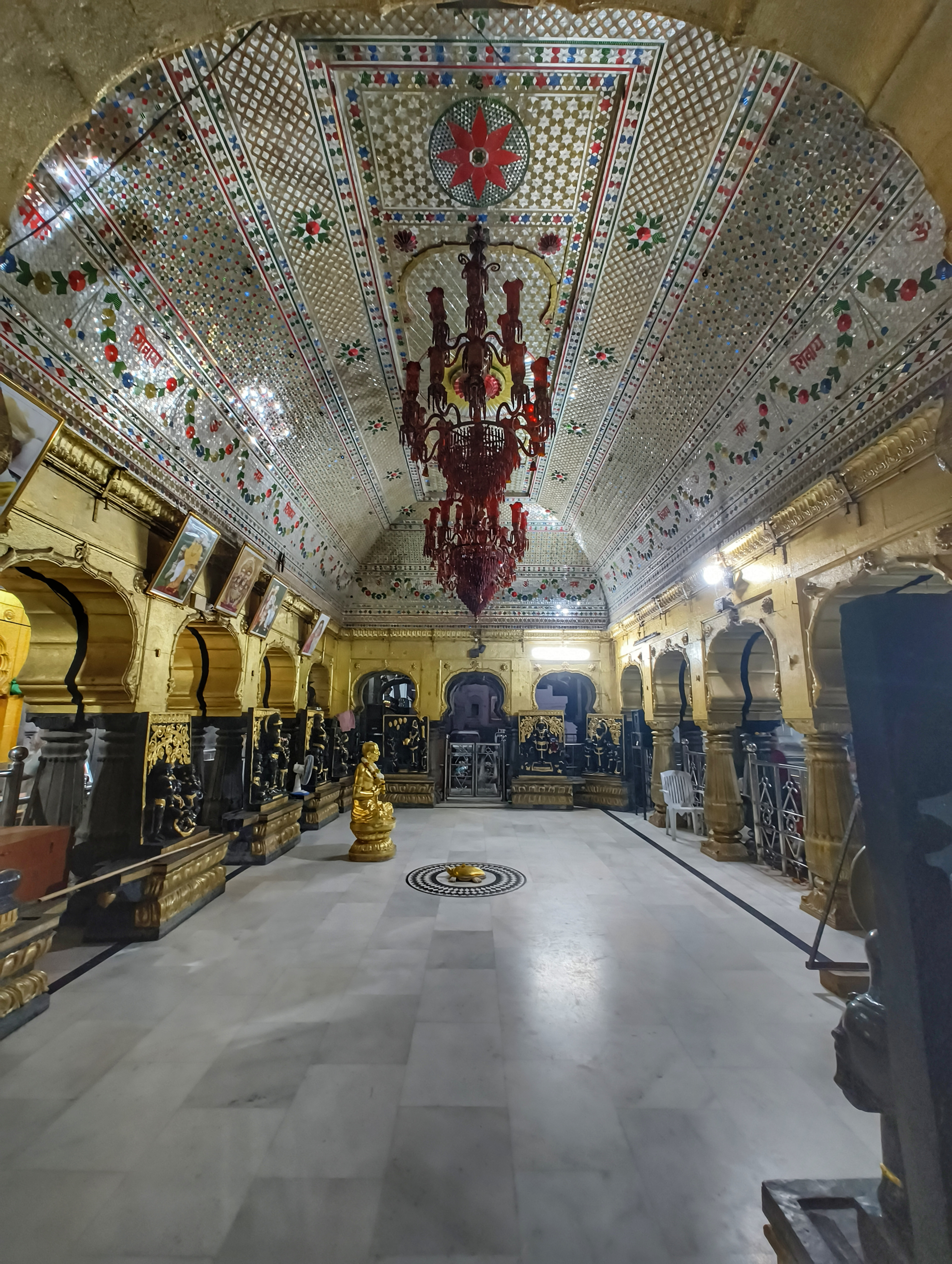
