= Radhakrishna (politician) =

Indian politician (born 1960)

Radhakrishna Doddamani

Member of Parliament, Lok Sabha
- Incumbent
- Assumed office 4 June 2024
- Preceded by: Umesh. G. Jadhav
- Constituency: Gulbarga, Karnataka

Personal details
- Born: 16 September 1960 (age 65) Gundgurthi, Karnataka, India
- Party: Indian National Congress
- Spouse: Jayashree Kharge (m. 1988)
- Relatives: Mallikarjun Kharge (father-in-law)
- Occupation: Agriculturist; politician

Radhakrishna Doddamani (born 16 September 1960), better known as Radhakrishna, is an Indian politician and Member of Parliament for Lok Sabha from Gulbarga constituency. He is a member of the Indian National Congress. He is the son-in-law of Rajya Sabha LoP Mallikarjun Kharge.

== See also ==
- 18th Lok Sabha
- Indian National Congress
