= Kalaburagi =

City in Karnataka, India

Kalaburagi Gulbarga
- City
- Clockwise from top left, Sharana Basaveshwara Temple, Buddha Vihar, Khwaja Banda Nawaz Dargah, CUK Kalaburagi, ESIC Medical College and PGIMSR, Kalaburagi and Kalaburagi Fort
- Interactive map of Kalaburagi
- Coordinates: 17.329°N 76.825°E
- Country: India
- State: Karnataka
- District: Kalaburagi

Government
  - Type: Municipal corporation
  - Body: Kalaburagi City Corporation; Kalaburagi Urban Development Authority
  - Mayor: Yellappa Naikodi
  - Member of Parliament: Radhakrishna Doddamani

Area
  - City: 192 km^{2} (74 sq mi)
- Elevation: 454 m (1,490 ft)

Population (2011)
  - City: 533,587
  - Density: 8,275/km^{2} (21,430/sq mi)
  - Metro: 543,147
- Time zone: UTC+5:30 (IST)
- PIN: 585101-106
- Telephone code: 91(847)-2XXXXXX
- Vehicle registration: KA-32
- Official language: Kannada
- Website: kalaburagicity.mrc.gov.in

Kalaburagi, formerly known as Gulbarga, is a city in the Indian state of Karnataka. It is headquarters of the eponymous Kalaburagi district and Kalaburagi division. Kalaburagi city is governed by a Municipal Corporation. It is home to multiple famous religious structures, like the Hazrath Khwaja Banda Nawaz Dargah, the Sharana Basaveshwara Temple and the Buddha Vihar. It also contains a fort built during the Bahmani rule. Other Bahmani monuments include the Haft Gumbaz (seven domes together) and the Shor Gumbad. Kalaburagi has the world's largest cannon, Kalaburagi has a few architectural marvels built during the Bahamani Kingdom rule, including the Jama Masjid in the Kalaburagi Fort. Kalaburagi houses the circuit bench of the High Court of Karnataka. Under the name Monuments and Forts of the Deccan Sultanate, several buildings in the city and with others in the region were put by UNESCO on its "tentative list" of World Heritage Site in 2014.

While the city was ranked among the top 10 Indian cities with the cleanest air and best AQI in 2024, it is considered as one of the economically backward areas nationally as well as in the state.

== Etymology ==
The earliest recorded name for the region dates back to 6th century CE when it was referred as "Kalburgi" by the Chalukyas, roughly translating to 'Rocky land' in Kannada. Kallu means stone/rock, while the suffix -burgi is debated as it could stand for buruju which means fortification in Kannada. The name was carried forward by the successive empires of Rashtrakutas, Yadavas, and Kakatiyas until 1321 CE when the region was annexed by Delhi Sultanate, who renamed it to 'Gulbarga' which meant '(City of) Flower Gardens' ultimately from the Persian words gul (flower) and bāgh (garden). Gulbarga remained as the name for both the district and its headquarters until 2014 when the Government of Karnataka reverted back to its current name of Kalaburagi.

== History ==
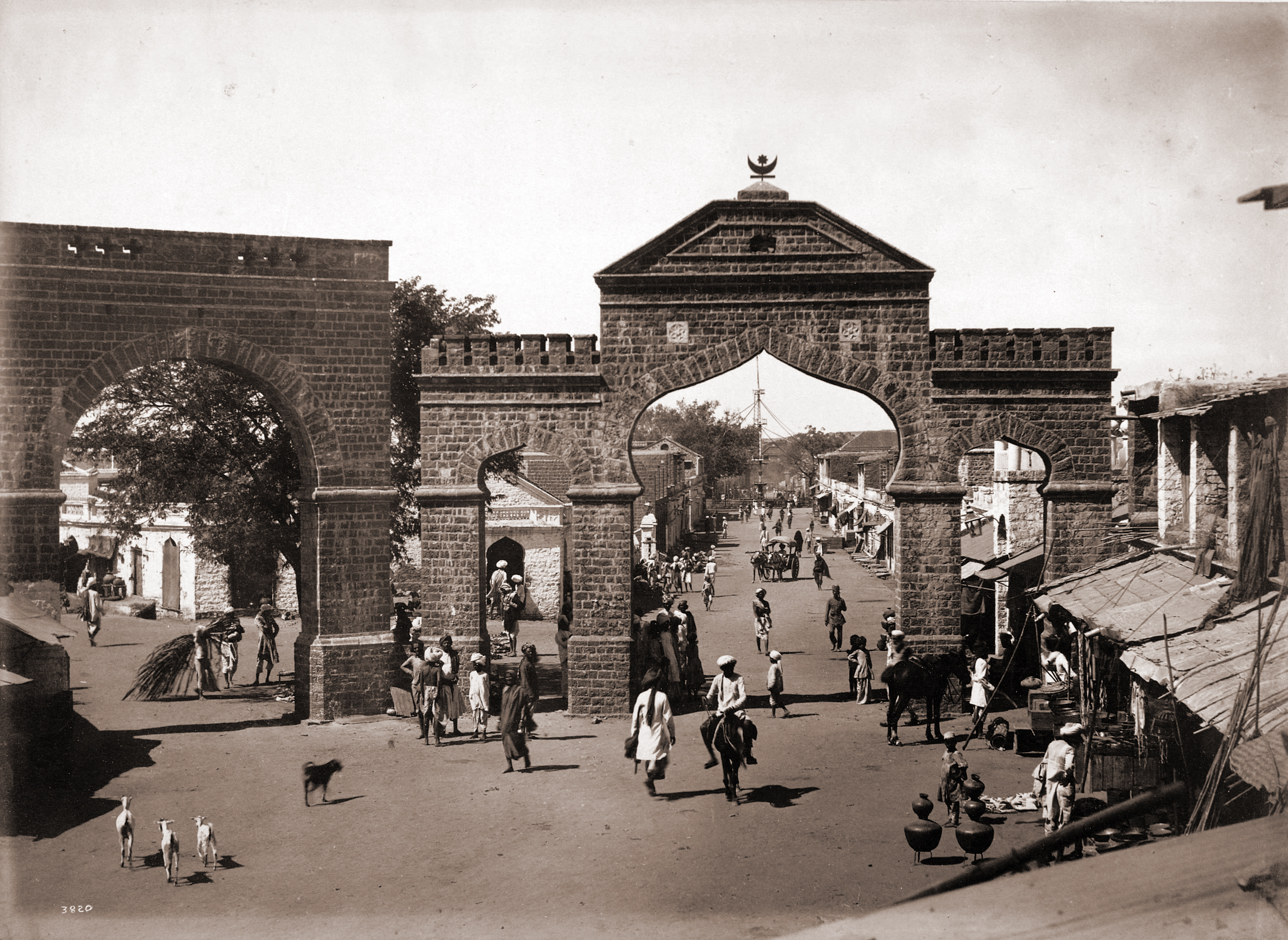
Asuf Gunj, Kalaburagi in 1880

The history of Kalaburagi dates to the sixth century. The Rashtrakutas gained control over the region, but the Chalukyas regained their domain within a short period and reigned supreme for over 200 years. The Kalyani Kalachuris who succeeded them ruled until the 12th century. Around the end of the 12th century, the Yadavas of Devagiri and the Hoysalas of Dwarasamadra destroyed the supremacy of the Chalukyas and Kalachuris of Kalyani. Around the same period, the Kakatiya kings of Warangal came into prominence and the present Kalaburagi and Raichur districts formed part of their domain. The Kakatiya power was subdued in 1308 and the entire Deccan, including the district of Kalaburagi, passed under the control of the Delhi Sultanate.

The revolt of the officers appointed from Delhi resulted in the founding of the Bahmani Sultanate in 1347 by Ala-ud-Din Bahman Shah, who chose Gulbarga (Hasanabad) to be the capital. When the Bahmani Sultanate came to an end in 1527, the kingdom broke up into five independent Deccan sultanates, Bijapur, Bidar, Berar, Ahmednagar, and Golconda. The present Gulbarga district came partly under the sultanate of Bidar and partly under the sultanate of Bijapur. The last of these sultanates, Golconda, finally fell to Aurangzeb in 1687.

With the conquest of the Deccan by Aurangzeb in the 17th century, Gulbarga passed under the Mughal Empire. In the early part of the 18th century, with the decline of the Mughal Empire, Nizam-ul-Mulk, Asaf Jah I, one of Aurangzeb's generals, formed the kingdom of Hyderabad, in which a major part of the Gulbarga area was also included. In 1948, Hyderabad State became a part of the Indian Union, and in 1956, excluding two talukas which were annexed to Andhra Pradesh, the Gulbarga district became part of the new Mysore State through the States Reorganisation Act in 1956.

== Geography ==
The entire district is on the Deccan Plateau, and the elevation ranges from 300 to 750 m above MSL. Two main rivers, the Krishna and Bhima, flow through the district. The predominant soil type is black soil. The district has many tanks, which irrigate the land along with the river. The Upper Krishna Project is a major irrigation venture in the district of Kalaburagi. The main crops are groundnuts, rice, and pulses. Kalaburagi is the largest producer of toor dal, or pigeon peas, in Karnataka. Kalaburagi is an industrially backward district but is showing signs of growth in the cement, textile, leather,chemical and glass processing industries. Kalaburagi has a university with Medical and Engineering Colleges. Central University of Karnataka (CuK) is located in Kadaganchi, Åland Taluk of Kalaburagi. The geographical area of the city is 64 square kilometres.

=== Climate ===
Kalaburagi has a hot semi-arid climate (BSh) bordering on a tropical wet and dry climate (Aw). The climate of the district is generally dry, with temperatures ranging from 8 °C to 45 °C and an annual rainfall of about 750 mm. The year in Kalaburagi is divided into three main seasons. The summer lasts from late February to May. It is followed by the southwest monsoon, which lasts from late June to late October. This is then followed by dry winter weather from late November until February.

Climate data for Kalaburagi (1991–2020, extremes 1901–2020)
Month	Jan	Feb	Mar	Apr	May	Jun	Jul	Aug	Sep	Oct	Nov	Dec	Year
Record high °C (°F)	36.3 (97.3)	40.3 (104.5)	43.0 (109.4)	45.1 (113.2)	47.3 (117.1)	46.0 (114.8)	38.4 (101.1)	37.8 (100.0)	37.4 (99.3)	38.2 (100.8)	35.7 (96.3)	36.2 (97.2)	46.1 (115.0)
Mean daily maximum °C (°F)	31.9 (89.4)	34.7 (94.5)	38.1 (100.6)	40.3 (104.5)	40.8 (105.4)	35.6 (96.1)	32.4 (90.3)	31.7 (89.1)	32.1 (89.8)	32.6 (90.7)	32.0 (89.6)	31.4 (88.5)	34.6 (94.3)
Mean daily minimum °C (°F)	16.3 (61.3)	18.6 (65.5)	22.4 (72.3)	25.1 (77.2)	25.9 (78.6)	23.8 (74.8)	22.9 (73.2)	22.5 (72.5)	22.5 (72.5)	21.3 (70.3)	18.8 (65.8)	16.0 (60.8)	21.4 (70.5)
Record low °C (°F)	6.7 (44.1)	9.4 (48.9)	12.8 (55.0)	13.3 (55.9)	17.8 (64.0)	12.7 (54.9)	17.2 (63.0)	16.4 (61.5)	17.8 (64.0)	10.0 (50.0)	7.8 (46.0)	5.6 (42.1)	5.6 (42.1)
Average rainfall mm (inches)	2.9 (0.11)	2.4 (0.09)	6.4 (0.25)	21.1 (0.83)	28.2 (1.11)	118.4 (4.66)	132.7 (5.22)	145.8 (5.74)	184.3 (7.26)	98.9 (3.89)	14.6 (0.57)	1.6 (0.06)	757.4 (29.82)
Average rainy days	0.3	0.2	0.6	1.9	2.3	6.6	9.3	9.2	9.3	5.3	1.3	0.1	46.3
Average relative humidity (%) (at 17:30 IST)	34	28	24	27	30	49	60	62	61	54	46	37	43
Source: India Meteorological Department

Gulburga has been ranked 33rd best "National Clean Air City" under (Category 2 3-10L Population cities) in India.

== Demographics ==
Religions in Kalaburagi city (2011)
Religion	Percent
Hinduism	59.62%
Islam	37.29%
Christianity	0.52%
Jainism	0.40%
Others†	2.17%
Distribution of religions †Includes Sikhs (0.2%), Buddhists (<0.2%).

As of the 2011 Indian census, Kalaburagi city has a population of 533,587. Males constitute 55% of the population and females 45%. Kalaburagi has an average literacy rate of 67%, higher than the national average of 59.5%. Male literacy is 70%, while that of females is 30%. In Kalaburagi, 15% of the population is under 6 years of age.

Languages of Kalaburgi city (2011)
1. Kannada (55.0%)
2. Urdu (35.8%)
3. Marathi (3.56%)
4. Hindi (2.37%)
5. Telugu (1.20%)
6. Lambadi (1.14%)
7. Others (0.91%)

At the time of the 2011 census, 55.04% of the population spoke Kannada, 35.78% Urdu, 3.56% Marathi, 2.37% Hindi, 1.20% Telugu and 1.14% Lambadi as their first language.

== Government and politics ==
Kalaburagi has been home to two ex-chief ministers of Karnataka, namely Veerendra Patil (1968–1971, 1988–1992) and Dharam Singh (2004–2006); both belonged to the Indian National Congress party.

Kalaburagi comes under Kalaburagi Lok Sabha constituency. Radhakrishna Doddamani from Indian National Congress (INC) is the Member of Parliament (MP) since 2024. Mallikarjun Kharge (born 21 July 1942) is an Indian politician, who is the current president of the Indian National Congress, and Member of Parliament, Rajya Sabha from Karnataka since 16 February 2021. He was also Leader of the Opposition in Rajya Sabha from 16 February 2021 to 1 October 2022. He was the Former Minister of Railways and Minister of Labour and Employment in the Government of India. Kharge was a Member of Parliament for Gulbarga, Karnataka from 2009 to 2019.

Kalaburagi city has two Vidhan Sabha constituencies: Kalaburagi Uttar (North) and Kalaburagi Dakshin (South). Both are part of the Kalaburagi Lok Sabha constituency. The MLA for Kalaburagi Uttar is Kaneez Fatima from Indian National Congress, while the MLA for Kalaburagi Dakshin is from Indian National congress (2023).

=== Municipal finance ===
According to financial data published on the CityFinance Portal of the Ministry of Housing and Urban Affairs, the Kalaburagi City Corporation reported total revenue receipts of ₹140 crore (US$17 million) and total expenditure of ₹196 crore (US$24 million) in 2022–23. Tax revenue accounted for about 17.9% of the total revenue, while the corporation received ₹84 crore in grants during the financial year.

== Culture/Cityscape ==
=== Art and architecture ===
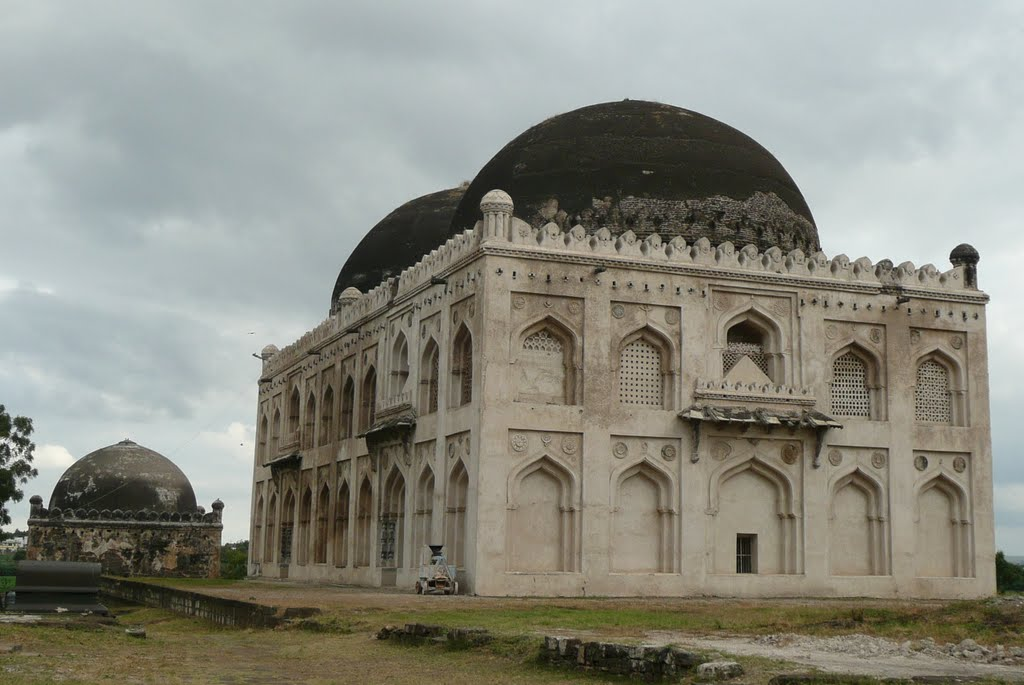
Haft Gumbaz

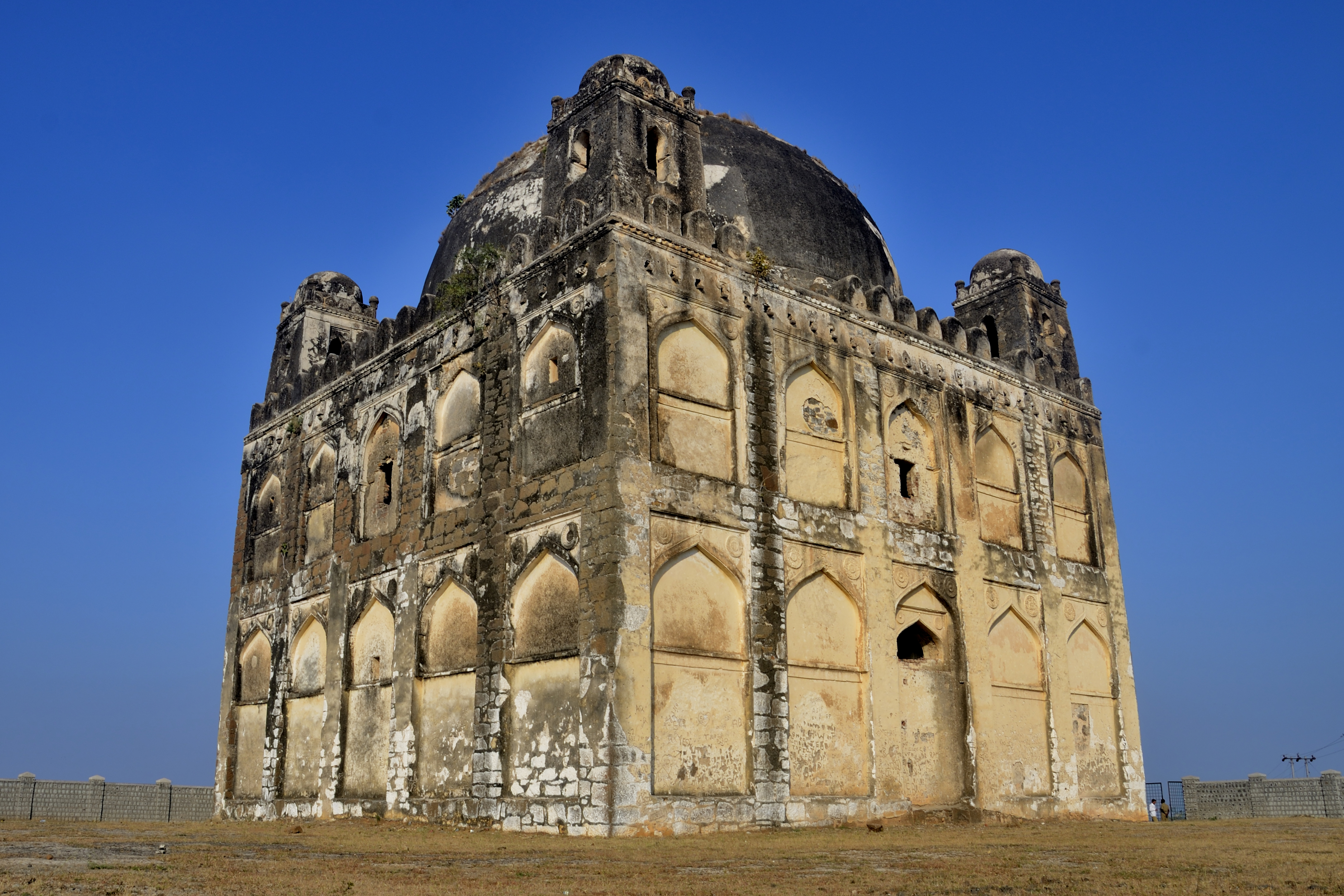
Chor Gumbad

The largest collection of Islamic art is seen at the domed ceiling and walls are adorned with paintings containing calligraphy designs and floral, flower and plants and geometric patterns inside the 14th-century tomb of Sufi saint Syed Shah Qhabulullah Husayni with natural colours. By religious restrictions, the artist was prohibited from depicting living beings in the interior of tomb, and his imagination was therefore employed either in inventing new designs for religious texts or in adding further delicacy and subtleness to the geometric and floral devices by making the drawings more and more intricate. A small tomb beside the said Sufi's has an excellent work of painted flower plants on the ceiling. Another vacant Shore Gumbad outside the city has delicate designs on its domed ceiling is superb.

The walls and ceiling of the tomb of Sultan Firuz Shah Bahmani can be appreciated which, although monotone, represents faithfully the creepers and floral patterns, the numerous geometric devices and calligraphic styles. The most notable building, however, of this period is the Jama Masjid of Kalaburagi fort, built by a Persian architect named Rafi in 1367 during the reign of Bahmani King Mohammed Shah I.

The glory of the towns in north Karnataka waned with the decline of the Bahmani dynasty, although Barid Shahi and Adil Shahi Kings kept up its beauty during their chequered rule. It suffers from pollution through nickel and lead.

Royal patronage played an important role in the making of Islamic art, as it has in the arts of other cultures. From the 14th century onwards, especially in eastern lands, the books of art provide the best documentation of courtly patronage.

== Transport ==
=== Air ===
Kalaburagi has its own airport named Kalaburagi airport which was inaugurated by Karnataka CM Yediyurappa on 22 November 2019 and started on the same day. It is connected with Bangalore and Tirupati by Star Air and Alliance Air.

Kalaburagi airport has second longest runway in Karnataka after the Kempegowda International Airport of Bangalore.

=== Rail ===
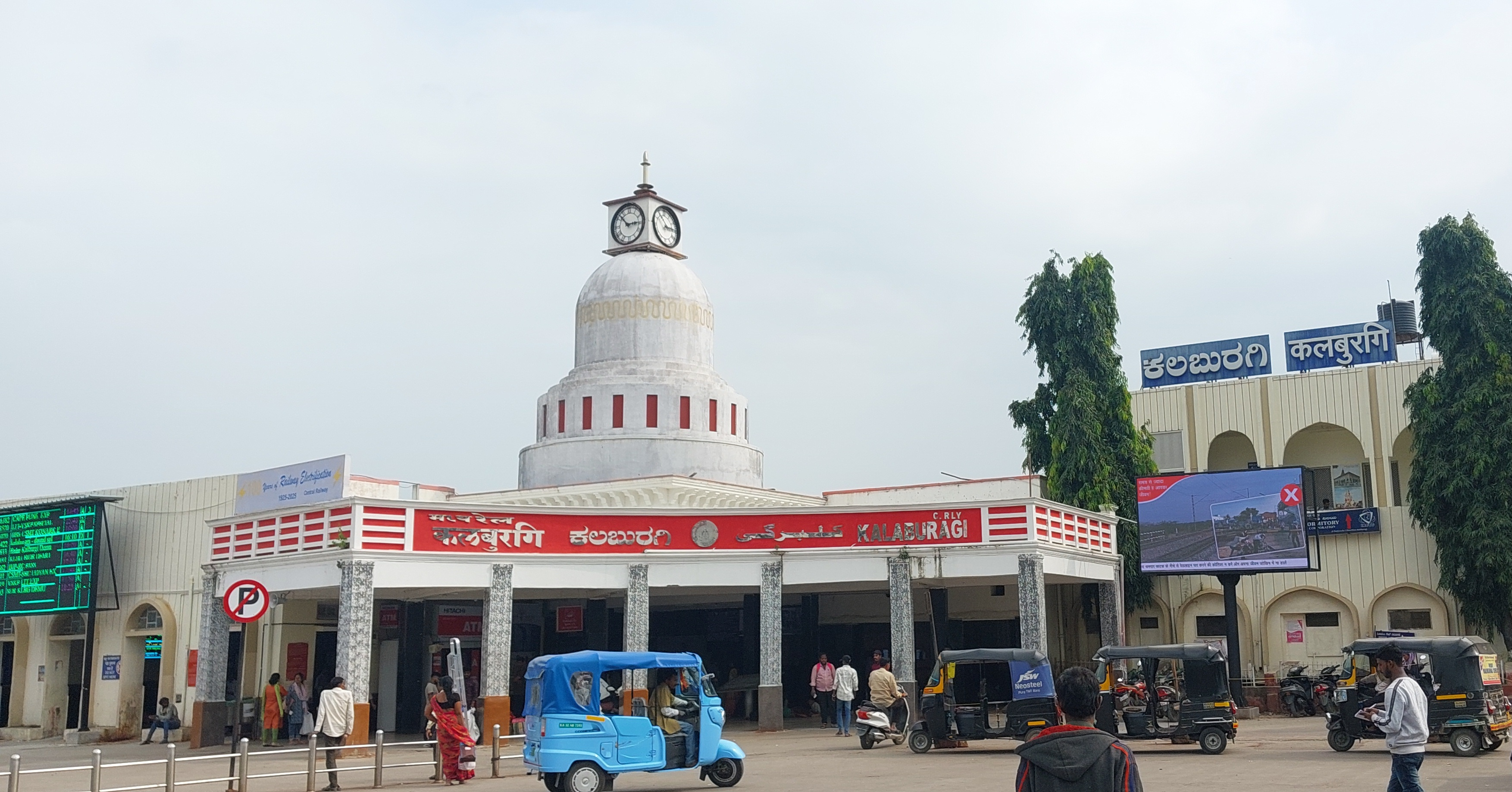
Kalaburagi railway station

Kalaburagi has a railway station named Kalaburagi Junction which comes under the Secunderabad division of Indian Railways. There are two railway lines that pass through Kalaburagi namely, Mumbai–Chennai line (Solapur–Guntakal section) and Kalaburagi - Bidar line.

Kalaburagi is directly linked through daily trains with Mumbai, Bangalore, Hyderabad, Chennai, Itarsi Junction, Mysore, Hassan, Hubli, Vijayawada, Coimbatore, Kochi, Kanyakumari etc.

Kalaburagi is planned to be a part of proposed high-speed rail corridor running from Mumbai to Hyderabad.

=== Road ===
Kalaburagi is the headquarter of the NEKRTC also called as Kalyana Karnataka RTC bus transport which was founded and started on 15 August 2000 and serves the North-Eastern Districts of Karnataka. It also has Nrupatunga city bus service which serves Kalaburagi urban and Sedam and is operated by NEKRTC itself.

== Education ==
The Central University of Karnataka is located in Kalaburagi. The Gulbarga University, Sharnbasva University, and Khaja Bandanawaz University, are the other universities in the city. It also has an ESIC Medical College.
