= Dravidian architecture =

Architectural idiom in Hindu temple architecture

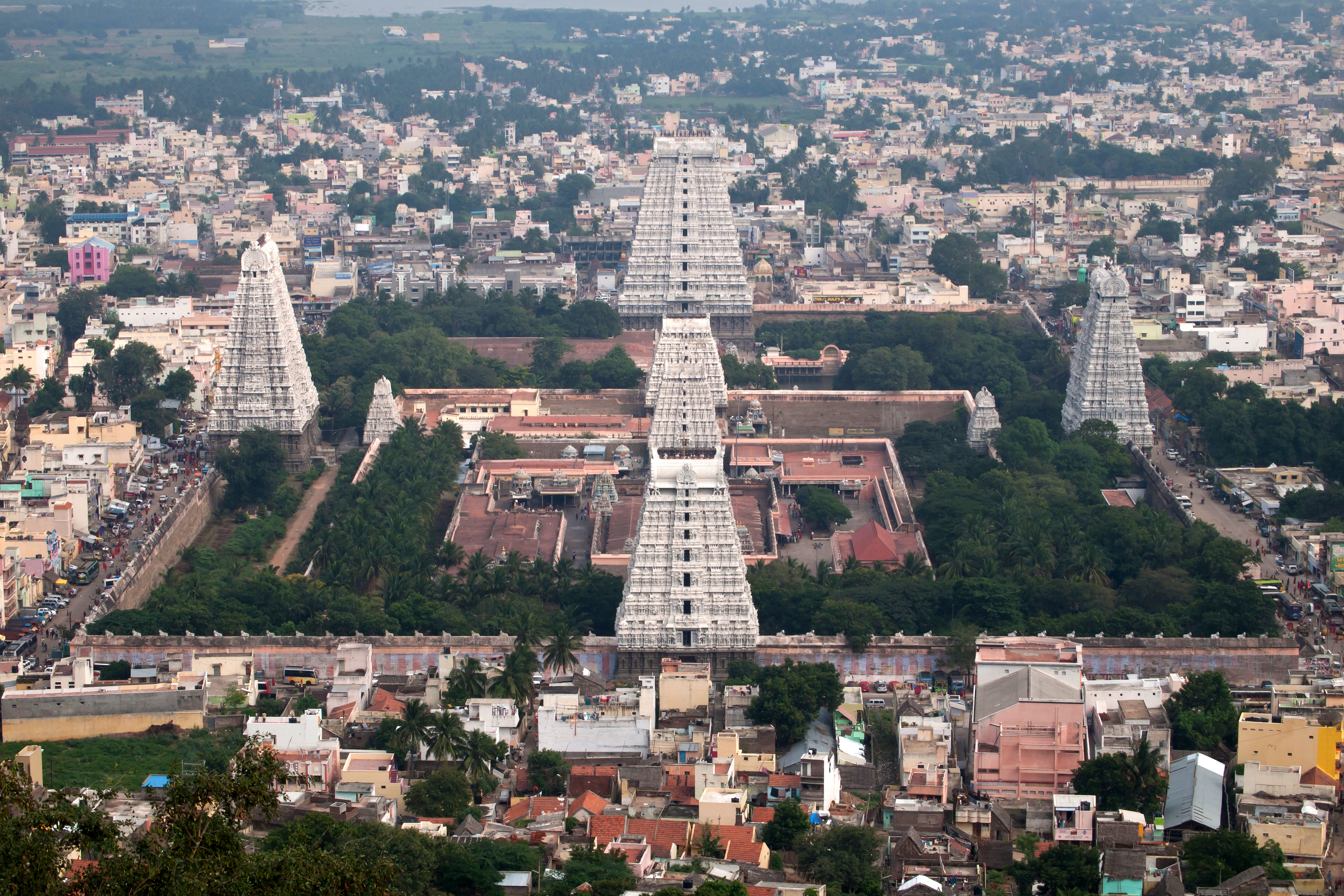
Gopurams around a large temple dwarf the older central structures. The Annamalaiyar Temple in Tiruvannamalai, Tamil Nadu

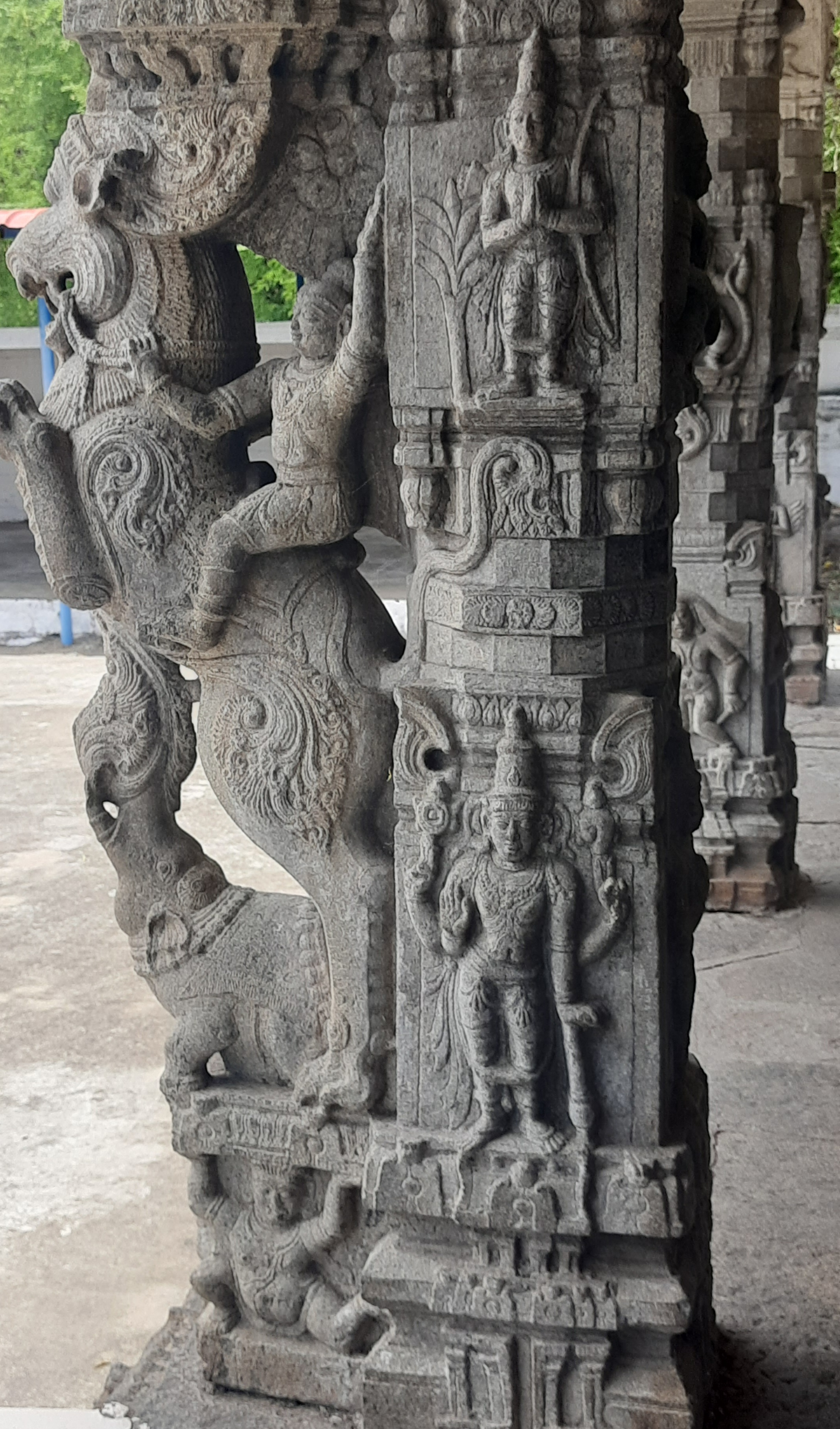
Vijayanagara style architecture characterized by Yali pillars at Sri Kalyana Ramaswamy temple in Thenkaraikottai, Ramaiyampati.

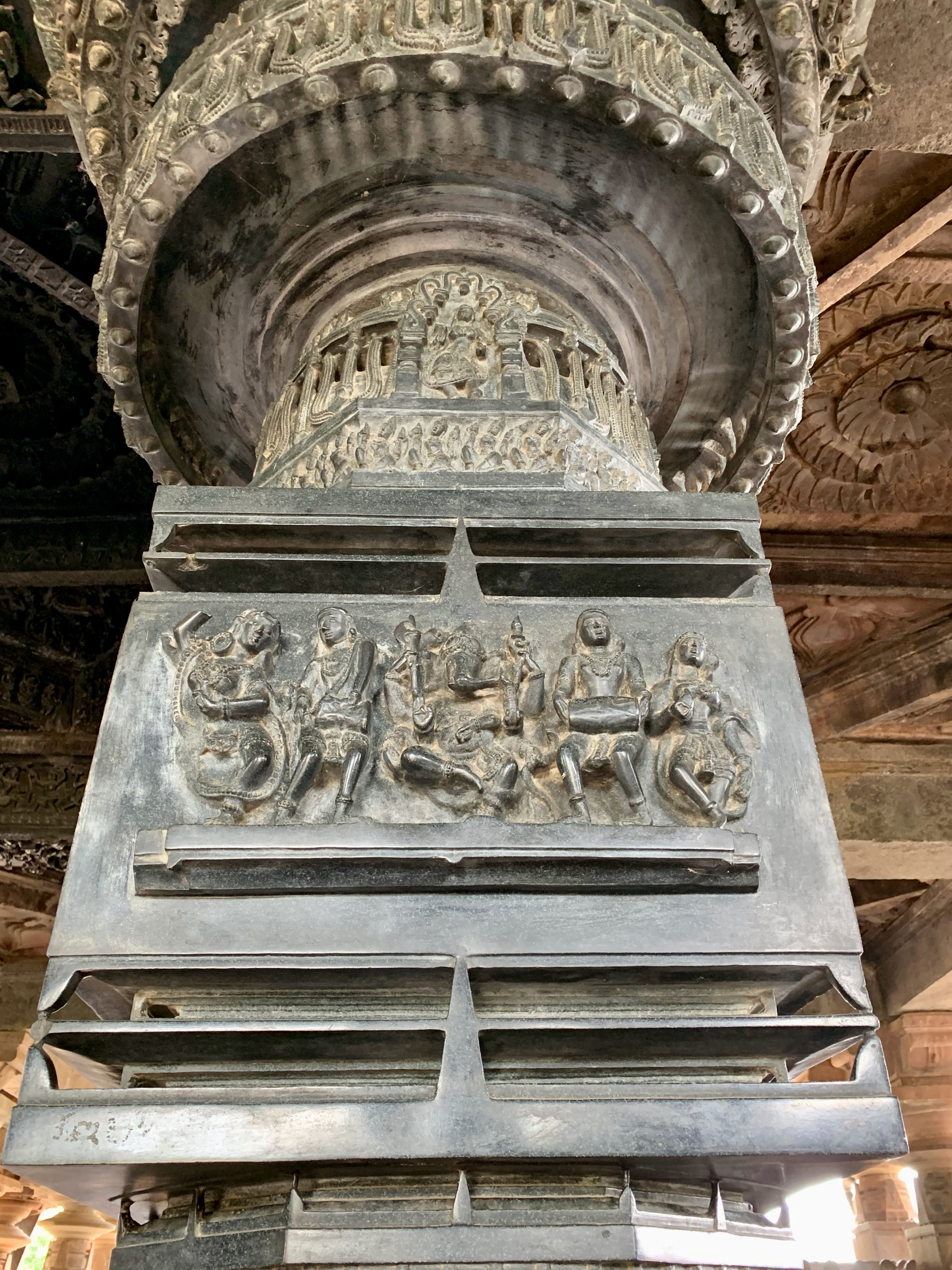
Kakathiya style architecture Ramappa Temple in Palampeta

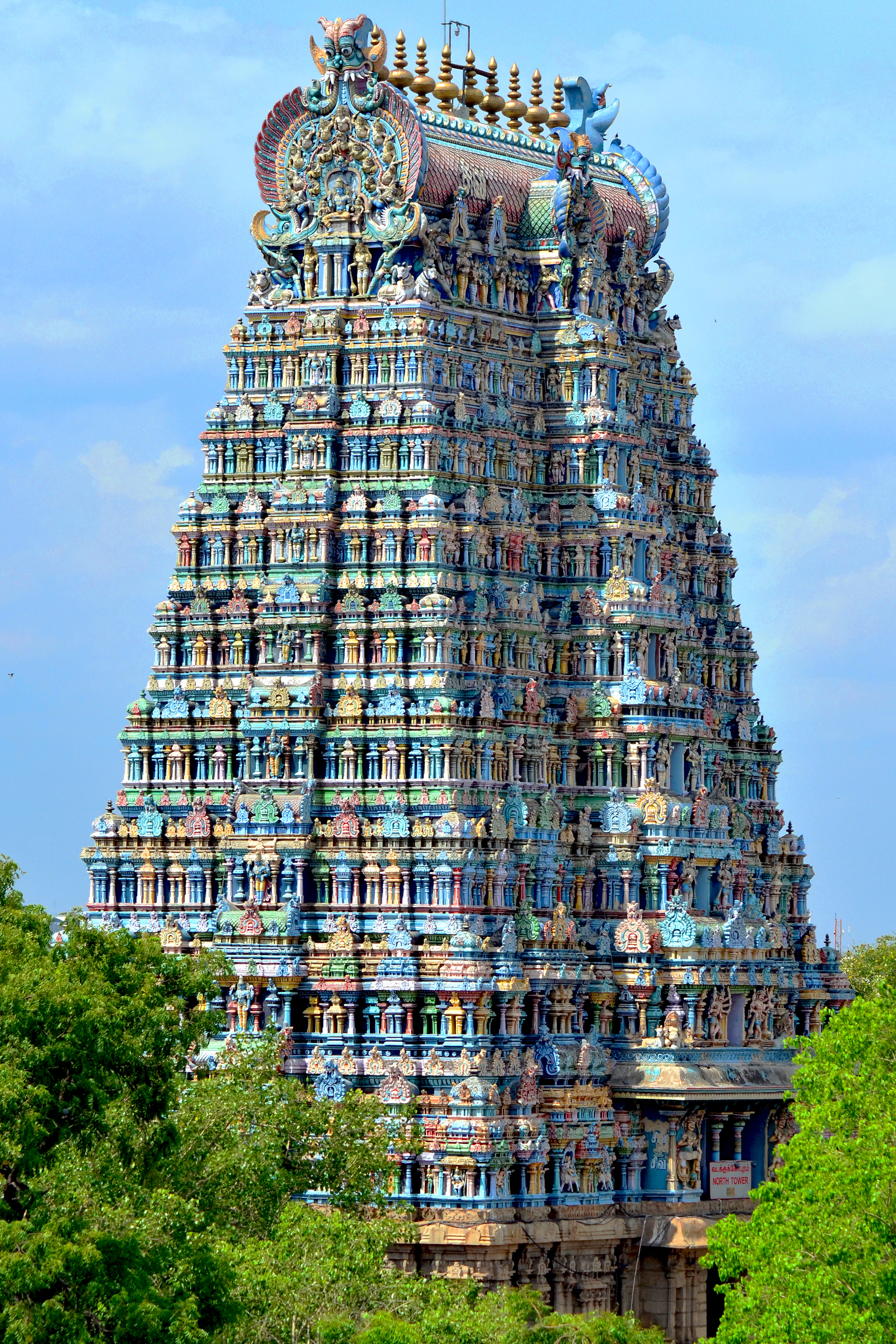
The west tower of the Meenakshi Temple

Dravidian architecture, or the Southern Indian temple style, is an architectural style in Hindu temple architecture that emerged from Southern India, reaching its final form by the sixteenth century.

In contrast with North Indian temple styles, Dravidian architecture uses shorter and more pyramidal towers, called vimana, over the garbhagriha or sanctuary, where the north has taller towers, usually curving inwards as they rise, called shikharas. Larger modern Dravidian style temples, however, include one or more high gopura or gatehouse entrances to the compound as their dominating feature; large temples have several dwarfing the vimana, although these are a much more recent development. There are numerous other distinct features, such as the dvarapalakas – twin guardians at the main entrance and the inner sanctum of the temple, and goshtams – deities carved in niches on the outer side walls of the garbhagriha.

Mentioned as one of three styles of temple building in early texts on vastu shastra or Hindu temple architecture, the majority of existing structures are in the Southern Indian states of Andhra Pradesh, Karnataka, Kerala, Tamil Nadu, Telangana, some parts of Maharashtra, Odisha and Sri Lanka. Various kingdoms and empires such as the Satavahanas, the Vakatakas of Vidarbha, the Cholas, the Cheras, the Kakatiyas, the Reddis, the Pandyas, the Pallavas, the Gangas, the Kadambas, the Rashtrakutas, the Chalukyas, the Hoysalas and Vijayanagara Empire among others have made substantial contribution to the evolution of Dravidian architecture.

== History ==
Mayamata and Manasara shilpa texts, which are estimated to have been in circulation by 5th to 7th century CE, is a guidebook on Dravidian style of vastu shastra design, construction, sculpture and joinery technique. Isanasivagurudeva paddhati is another text from the 9th century describing the art of building in India in south and central India. In north India, Brihat-samhita by Varāhamihira is the widely cited ancient Sanskrit manual from 6th century describing the design and construction of Nagara style of Hindu temples. Traditional Dravidian architecture and symbolism are also based on Agamas. The Agamas are non-vedic in origin and have been dated either as post-vedic texts or as pre-vedic compositions. The Agamas are a collection of Tamil and Sanskrit scriptures chiefly constituting the methods of temple construction and creation of murti, worship means of deities, philosophical doctrines, meditative practices, attainment of sixfold desires and four kinds of yoga.

=== Composition and structure ===
Chola style temples consist almost invariably of the three following parts, arranged in differing manners, but differing in themselves only according to the age in which they were executed:

1. The pavilions, porches, or Mandapas, which always cover and precede the door leading to the cell.
2. Gate-pyramids, Gopuras, which are the principal features in the quadrangular enclosures that surround the more notable temples. Gopuras are very common in Dravidian temples.
3. Pillared halls (Chaultris or Chawadis; may also be referred to as Mandapas,) are used for many purposes and are the invariable accompaniments of these temples.

Besides these, a South Indian temple usually has a tank called the Kalyani or Pushkarni – to be used for sacred purposes or the convenience of the priests – dwellings for all the grades of the priesthood are attached to it, and other buildings for state or convenience.

== Influence from different periods ==
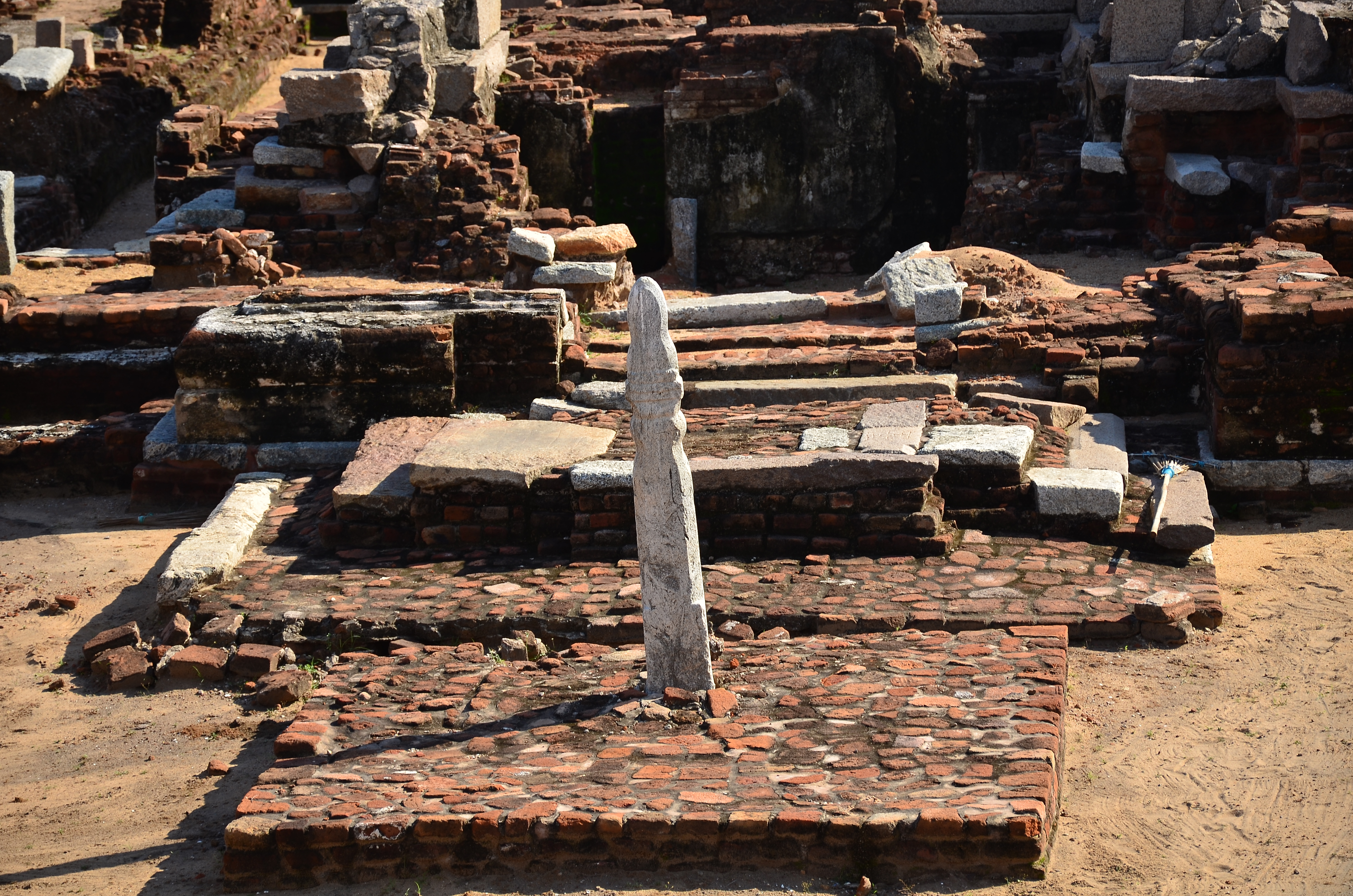
Stone vel on a brick platform at the entrance to the Murugan Temple, Saluvankuppam, Tamil Nadu, 300 BCE-300 CE

In Southern India seven kingdoms and empires stamped their influence on architecture during different times:

=== Sangam period ===
From 300 BCE to 300 CE, the greatest accomplishments of the kingdoms of the early Chola, Chera and the Pandyan kingdoms included brick shrines to deities Vishnu, Kartikeya, Shiva, and Amman . Several of these have been unearthed near Adichanallur, Kaveripoompuharpattinam and Mahabalipuram, and the construction plans of these sites of worship were shared to some detail in various poems of Sangam literature. There are 3 temples which date around 5 CE to 5 BCE, The Srirangam Ranganathaswamy Temple which has inscriptions dating around 100 BCE to 100 CE. Hence, "making it one of the oldest surviving active temple complexes in South India". Another such temple is the Subrahmanya Temple, Saluvankuppam, unearthed in 2005, consists of three layers. The lowest layer, consisting of a brick shrine, is one of the oldest of its kind in South India, and is the oldest shrine found dedicated to Murukan. It is one of only two brick shrine pre Pallava Hindu temples to be found in the state, the other being the Veetrirundha Perumal Temple at Veppathur dedicated to Lord Vishnu. The dynasties of early medieval Tamilakkam expanded and erected structural additions to many of these brick shrines. Sculptures of erotic art, nature and deities from the Ranganathaswamy Temple and Kallazhagar Temple date from the Sangam period.

=== Pallavas ===
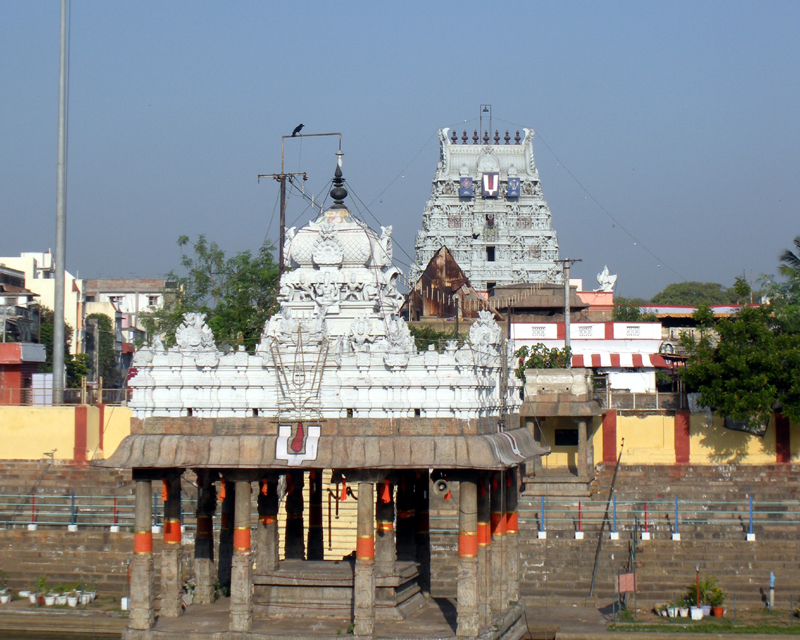
The Parthasarathy Temple in Chennai is one of the oldest temples of Pallavas dating early 500 CE

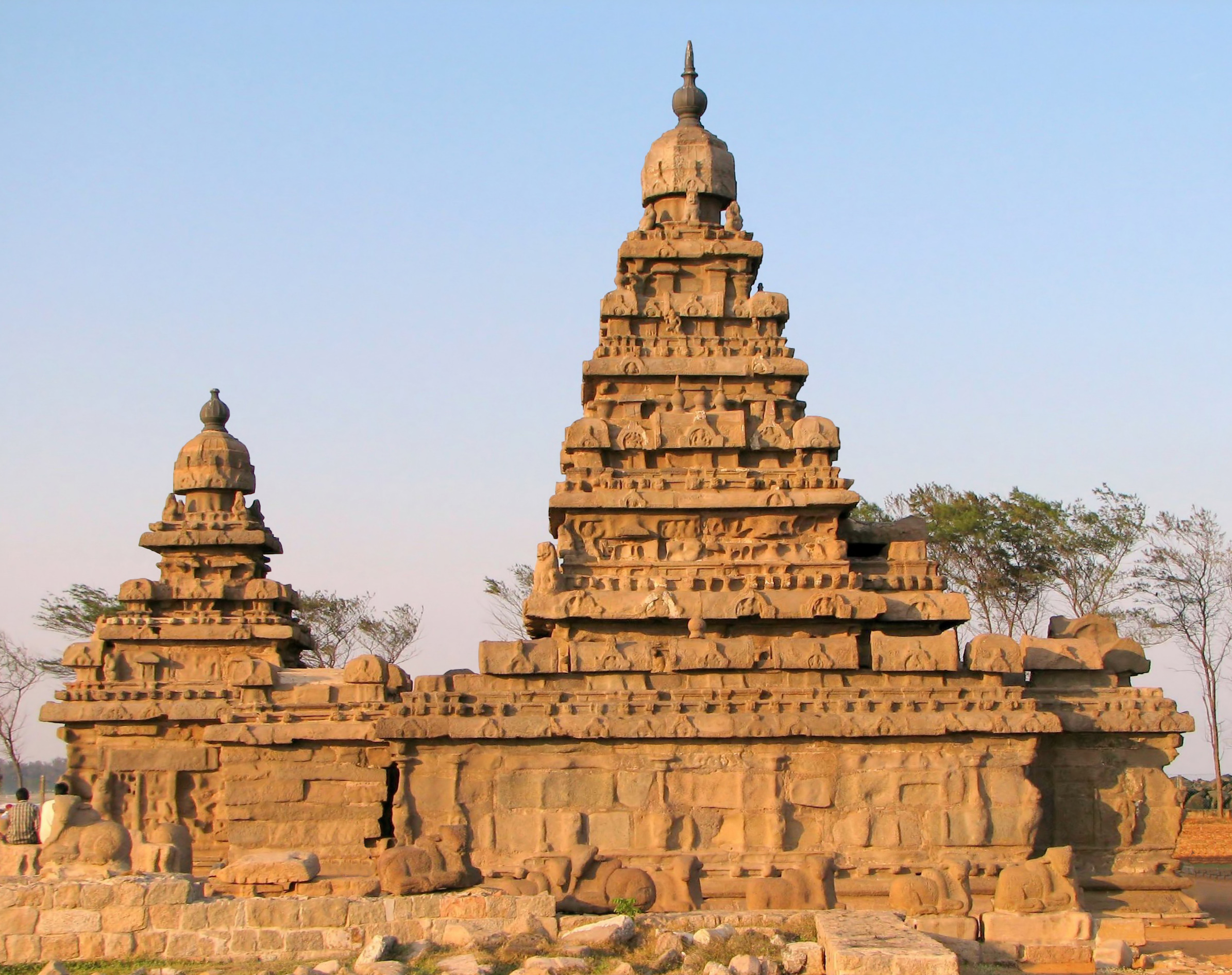
The rock-cut Shore Temple of the temples in Mahabalipuram, Tamil Nadu, dated between 700 and 728 CE

The Pallavas ruled from 275 CE to 900 CE, and their greatest constructed accomplishments are the single rock temples in Mahabalipuram and their capital Kanchipuram, now located in Tamil Nadu.

The earliest examples of Pallava constructions are rock-cut temples dating from 610 to 690 CE and structural temples between 690 and 900 CE. The greatest accomplishments of the Pallava architecture are the rock-cut Group of Monuments at Mahabalipuram at Mahabalipuram, a UNESCO World Heritage Site, including the Shore Temple. This group includes both excavated pillared halls, with no external roof except the natural rock, and monolithic shrines where the natural rock is entirely cut away and carved to give an external roof. Early temples were mostly dedicated to Shiva. The Kailasanatha temple also called Rajasimha Pallaveswaram in Kanchipuram built by Narasimhavarman II also known as Rajasimha is a fine example of the Pallava style temple.

Contrary to popular impression about the succeeding empire of the Cholas pioneering in building large temple complexes, it was the Pallavas who actually pioneered not only in making large temples after starting construction of rock cut temples without using mortar, bricks etc. Examples of such temples are the Thiruppadagam and Thiruooragam temples that have 28 and 35 feet (11 m) high images of Lord Vishnu in his manifestation as Pandavadhoothar and Trivikraman forms of himself. In comparison, the Siva Lingams in the Royal Temples of the Cholas at Thanjavur and Gangaikonda Cholapurams are 17 and 18 feet (5.5 m) high. Considering that the Kanchi Kailasanatha Temple built by Rajasimha Pallava was the inspiration for Raja Raja Chola's Brihadeeswara at Thanjavur, it can be safely concluded that the Pallavas were among the first emperors in India to build both large temple complexes and very large deities and idols Many of Vishnu temples at Kanchi built by the great Pallava emperors and indeed their incomparable Rathas and the Arjuna's penance Bas Relief (also called descent of the Ganga) are proposed UNESCO World Heritage Sites. The continuous Chola, Pallava and Pandiyan belt temples (along with those of the Adigaimans near Karur and Namakkal) like the Narasimhaswamy Temple, Namakkal, as well as the Sathyamurthi Perumal Temple in Pudukottai uniformly represent the pinnacle of the South Indian Style of Architecture that surpasses any other form of architecture prevalent between the Deccan Plateau and Kanyakumari. In the Telugu country the style was more or less uniformly conforming to the South Indian or Dravidian idiom of architecture.

=== Rashtrakutas ===
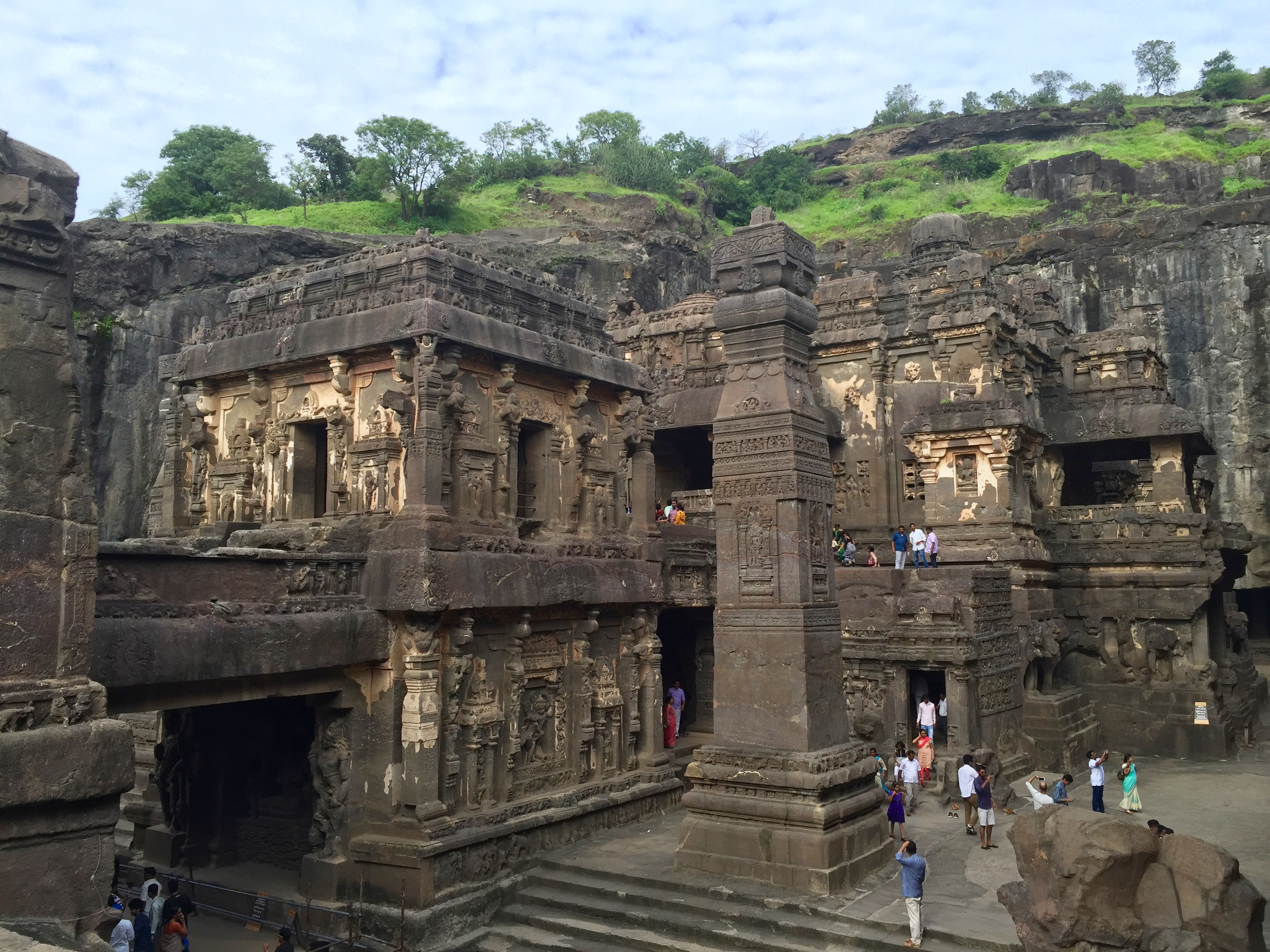
The rock-cut Kailash Temple at Ellora

The Rashtrakutas who ruled the Deccan from Manyakheta, Karnataka in the period 753–973 CE built some of the finest Dravidian monuments at Ellora (the Kailasanatha temple), in the rock-cut architecture idiom, with a style showing influences from both north and south India. Some other fine monuments are the Jaina Narayana temple at Pattadakal and the Navalinga temples at Kuknur in Karnataka.

The Rashtrakuta contributions to art and architecture are reflected in the carved rock shrines at Ellora and Elephanta, situated in present-day Maharashtra. It is said that they altogether constructed 34 rock-cut shrines, but most extensive and sumptuous of them all is the Kailasanatha temple at Ellora. The temple is an extraordinary achievement of Dravidian art. The walls of the temple have marvellous sculptures from Hindu mythology including Ravana, Shiva and Parvathi while the ceilings have paintings.

These projects were commissioned by King Krishna I after the Rashtrakuta rule had spread into South India from the Deccan. The architectural style used was partly Dravidian. They do not contain any of the shikharas common to the Nagara style and were built on the same lines as the Virupaksha temple at Pattadakal in Karnataka.

=== Chalukyas ===
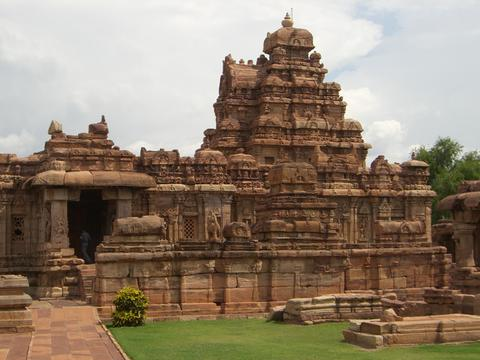
Virupaksha Temple, Pattadakal, Karnataka built in 740

The Badami Chalukyas also called the Early Chalukyas, ruled from Badami, Karnataka in the period 543–753 CE and spawned the Vesara style called Badami Chalukya Architecture. The finest examples of their art are seen in Pattadakal, Aihole and Badami in northern Karnataka. Over 150 temples remain in the Malaprabha basin.

The most enduring legacy of the Chalukya dynasty is the architecture and art that they left behind. More than one hundred and fifty monuments attributed to the Badami Chalukya, and built between 450 and 700, remain in the Malaprabha basin in Karnataka.

The rock-cut temples of Pattadakal, a UNESCO World Heritage Site, Badami, Aihole and Mahakuta are their most celebrated monuments. Two of the famous paintings at Ajanta cave no. 1, "The Temptation of the Buddha" and "The Persian Embassy" are attributed to them. This is the beginning of Chalukya style of architecture and a consolidation of South Indian style.

The Western Chalukyas also called the Kalyani Chalukyas or Later Chalukyas ruled the deccan from 973 to 1180 CE from their capital Kalyani in modern Karnataka and further refined the Chalukyan style, called the Western Chalukya architecture. Over 50 temples exist in the Krishna River-Tungabhadra doab in central Karnataka. The Kasi Vishveshvara at Lakkundi, Mallikarjuna at Kuruvatii, Kalleshwara temple at Bagali and Mahadeva at Itagi are the finest examples produced by the Later Chalukya architects.

The reign of Western Chalukya dynasty was an important period in the development of architecture in the Deccan. Their architectural developments acted as a conceptual link between the Badami Chalukya Architecture of the 8th century and the Hoysala architecture popularised in the 13th century. The art of Western Chalukyas is sometimes called the "Gadag style" after the number of ornate temples they built in the Tungabhadra – Krishna River doab region of present-day Gadag district in Karnataka. Their temple building reached its maturity and culmination in the 12th century, with over a hundred temples built across the deccan, more than half of them in present-day Karnataka. Apart from temples they are also well known for ornate stepped wells (Pushkarni) which served as ritual bathing places, many of which are well preserved in Lakkundi. Their stepped well designs were later incorporated by the Hoysalas and the Vijayanagara empire in the coming centuries.

=== Kakatiyas ===
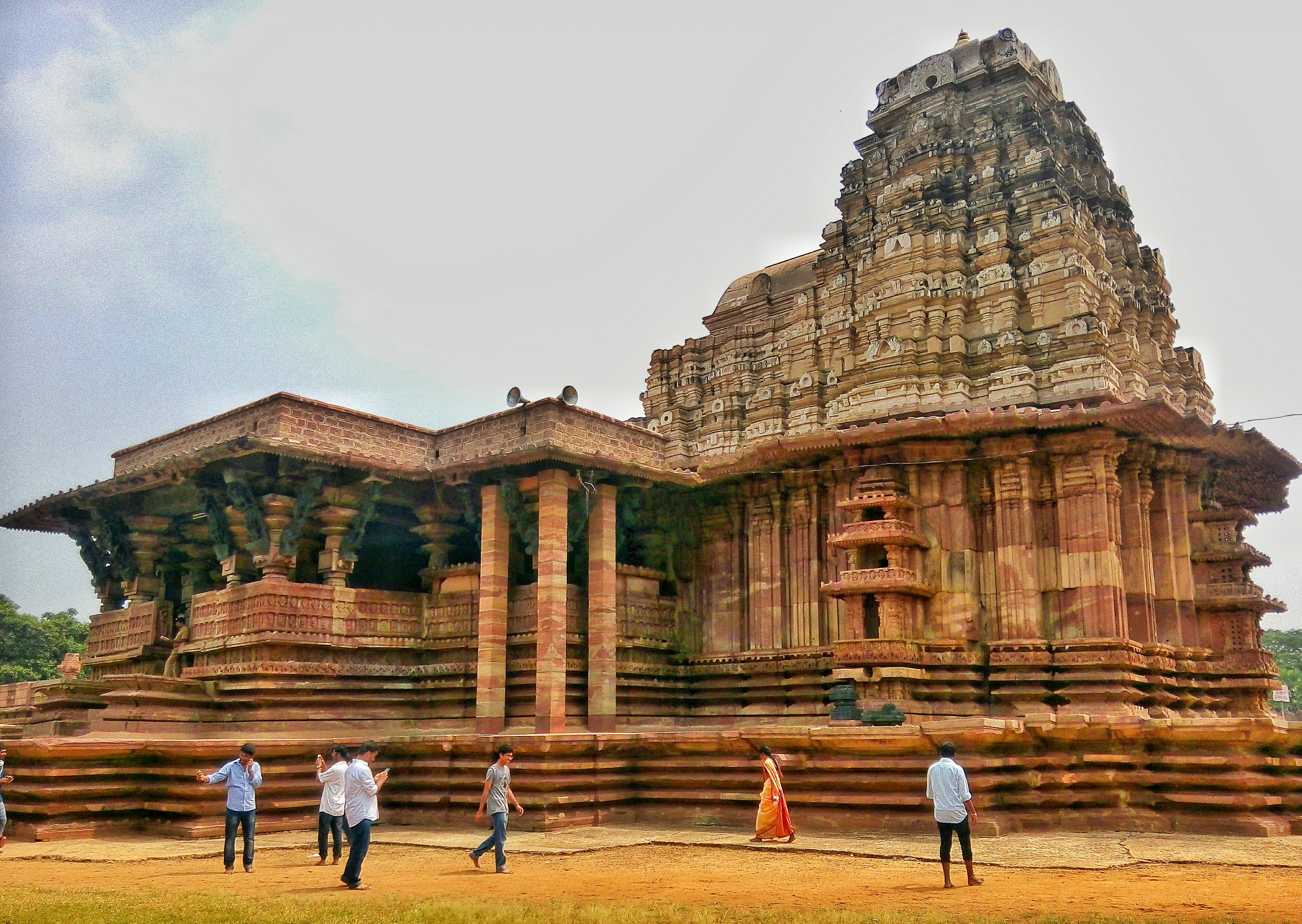
Profile of the Ramappa Temple

Kakatiya architecture was a notable Vesara temple building architecture developed during the rule of the Kakatiya dynasty (1163–1323 CE), in the region comprising present-day Telangana and Andhra Pradesh states of India. The Kakatiya architecture is more significant in Hanamakonda — their first capital and Warangal being their second capital.

Most of the Kakatiya architecture is influenced from Chalukya architecture. It is a fusion of Dravidian architecture and Nagara Bhumija styles in which sandbox technology is used to construct Vimana—horizontal stepped tower. There are hundreds of monuments in the core of Hanamakonda and Warangal of which Thousand Pillar Temple, Ramappa Temple, Ramappa Lake, Warangal Fort and Kota Gullu are prominent. Ramappa Temple, also known as the Rudreswara temple, is a UNESCO World Heritage Site located in Mulugu.

=== Pandya ===
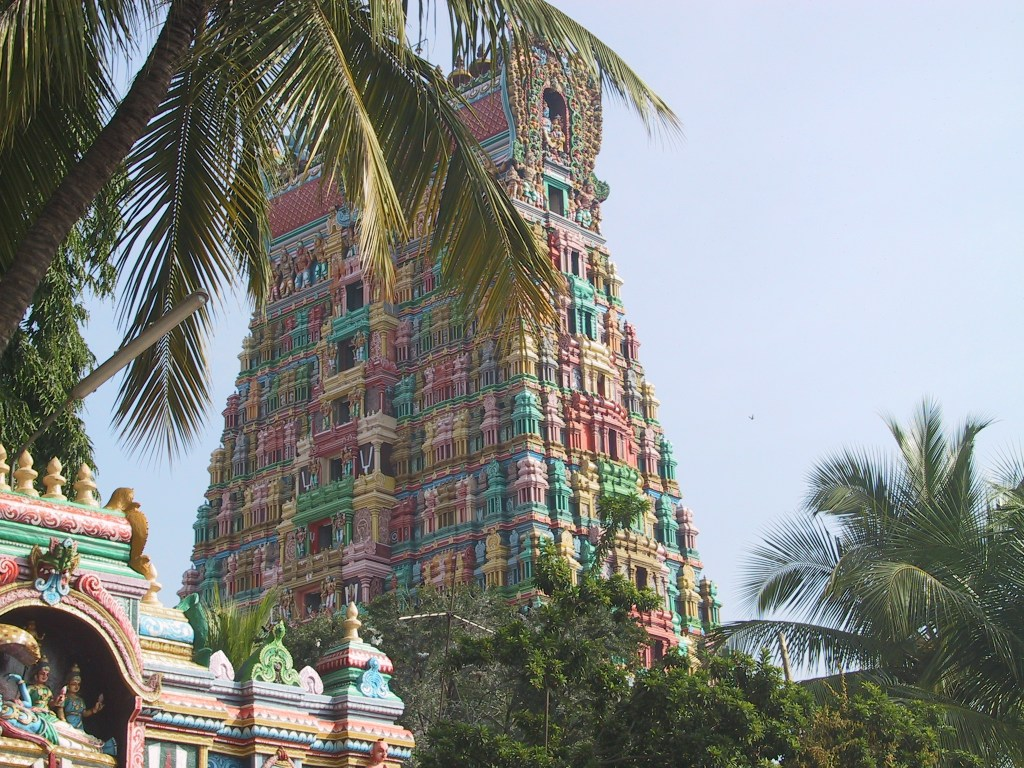
Srivilliputhur Andal temple

Srivilliputhur Andal temple Rajagopuram is said to have been built by Periyalvar, the father-in-law of the Lord, with a purse of gold that he won in debates held in the palace of Pandya King Vallabhadeva. The primary landmark of Srivilliputtur is a 12-tiered tower structure dedicated to the Lord of Srivilliputtur, known as Vatapatrasayee. The tower of this temple rises 192 feet (59 m) high.The Srivilliputhur Andal Temple's Gopuram is considered to be the one shown prominently in the emblem of Tamil Nadu . Other significant temples of the Pandyas include the Meenakshi Temple in Madurai.

=== Cholas ===
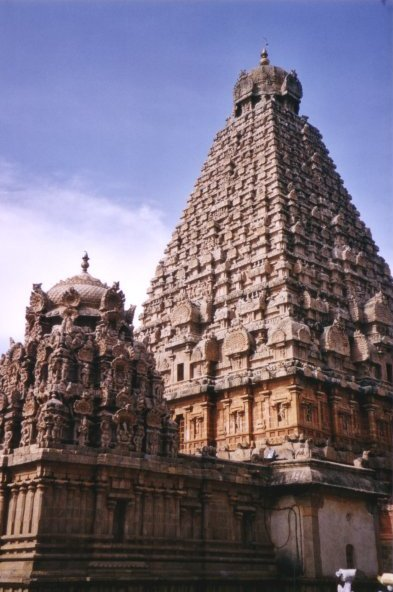
Detail of the main Vimana of the Thanjavur Temple-Tamil Nadu

The Imperial Chola kings ruled from 848 CE to 1280 CE and included Rajaraja Chola I and his son Rajendra Chola who built temples such as the three Great Living Chola Temples (UNESCO World Heritage Site) and the Kampaheswarar Temple at Thirubuvanam.

The Cholas were prolific temple builders right from the times of the first king Vijayalaya Chola after whom the eclectic chain of Vijayalaya Chozhisvaram temple near Narttamalai exists. These are the earliest specimen of Dravidian temples under the Cholas. His son Aditya I built several temples around the Kanchi and Kumbakonam regions.

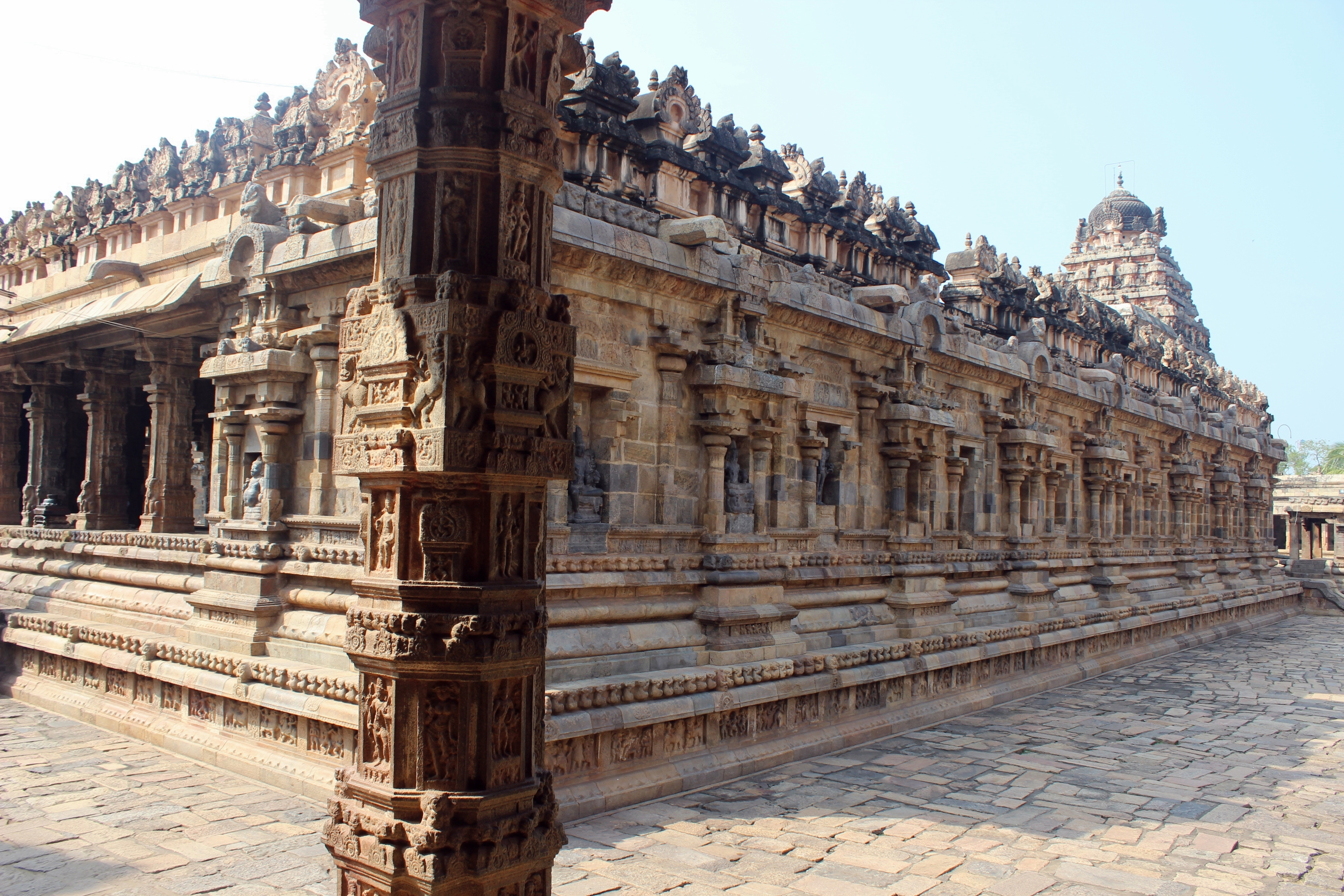
A Dravidian architecture style pillar in Airavatesvara temple, Darasuram, Thanjavur district, Tamil Nadu.

Temple building received great impetus from the conquests and the genius of Aditya I Parantaka I, Sundara Chola, Rajaraja Chola and his son Rajendra Chola I. Rajendra Chola 1 built the Rajaraja Temple at Thanjur after his own name. The maturity and grandeur to which the Chola architecture had evolved found expression in the two temples of Tanjavur and Gangaikondacholapuram. He also proclaimed himself as Gangaikonda. In a small portion of the Kaveri belt between Tiruchy-Tanjore-Kumbakonam, at the height of their power, the Cholas have left over 2300 temples, with the Tiruchy-Thanjavur belt itself boasting of more than 1500 temples. The magnificent Siva temple of Thanjavur built by Raja Raja I in 1009 as well as the Brihadisvara Temple of Gangaikonda Cholapuram, completed around 1030, are both fitting memorials to the material and military achievements of the time of the two Chola emperors. The largest and tallest of all Indian temples of its time, the Tanjore Brihadisvara is at the apex of South Indian architecture. In fact, two succeeding Chola kings Raja Raja II and Kulothunga III built the Airavatesvara Temple at Darasuram and the Kampahareswarar Siva Temple at Tribhuvanam respectively, both temples being on the outskirts of Kumbakonam around 1160 CE and 1200 CE. All the four temples were built over a period of nearly 200 years reflecting the glory, prosperity and stability under the Chola emperors.

Contrary to popular impression, the Chola emperors patronized and promoted construction of a large number of temples that were spread over most parts of the Chola empire. These include 40 of the 108 Vaishnava Divya Desams out of which 77 are found spread most of South India and others in Andhra and North India. In fact, the Sri Ranganathaswamy Temple in Srirangam, which is the biggest temple in India and the Chidambaram Natarajar Temple (though originally built by the Pallavas but possibly seized from the Cholas of the pre-Christian era when they ruled from Kanchi) were two of the most important temples patronized and expanded by the Cholas and from the times of the second Chola King Aditya I, these two temples have been hailed in inscriptions as the tutelary deities of the Chola Kings.

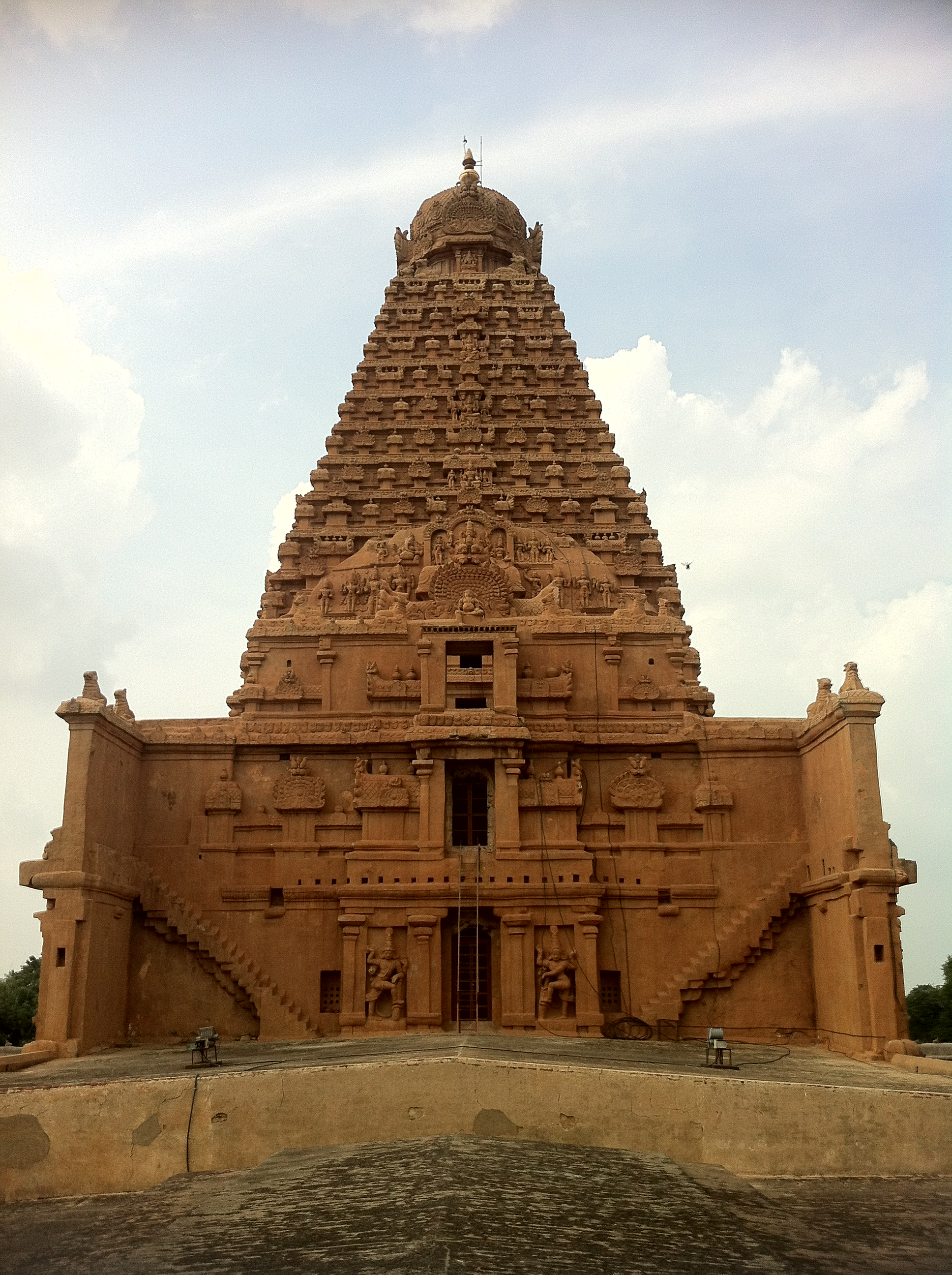
The Brihadeeswarar Temple (11th century), Tanjore has a vimana tower that is 216 ft (66 m) high, a classical example of Dravidian architecture. and The sikhara, a cupolic dome (25 tons), is octagonal and rests on a single block of granite, weighing 80 tons.

Temple shrine on the Koneswaram temple promontory extremity and the Ketheeswaram temple and Munneswaram temple compounds contained tall gopuram towers by Chola rule of Trincomalee, Mannar, Puttalam and Chidambaram's expansion that escalated the building of those syncretic latter styles of Dravidian architecture seen across the continent pictured.

Of course, the two Brihadisvara Temples at Thanjavur and Gangaikonda Cholapuram as well as the other two Siva temples, namely the Airavatesvara Temple of Darasuram and the Sarabeswara (Shiva )Temple which is also popular as the Kampahareswarar Temple at Thirubhuvanam, both on the outskirts of Kumbakonam were the royal temples of the Cholas to commemorate their innumerable conquests and subjugation of their rivals from other parts of South India, Deccan Ilangai or Sri Lanka and the Narmada-Mahanadi-Gangetic belts. But the Chola emperors underlined their non-partisan approach to religious iconography and faith by treating the presiding deities of their other two peerless creations, namely the Ranganathaswamy Temple dedicated to Lord Vishnu at Srirangam and the Nataraja Temple at Chidambaram which actually is home to the twin deities of Siva and Vishnu (as the reclining Govindarajar) to be their 'Kuladheivams' or tutelary (or family) deities. The Cholas also preferred to call only these two temples which home their tutelary or family deities as Koil or the 'Temple', which denotes the most important places of worship for them. The above-named temples are being proposed to be included among the UNESCO World Heritage Sites, which will elevate them to the exacting and exalting standards of the Great Living Chola Temples.

The temple of Gangaikondacholapuram, the creation of Rajendra Chola I, was intended to exceed its predecessor in every way. Completed around 1030, only two decades after the temple at Thanjavur and in much the same style, the greater elaboration in its appearance attests the more affluent state of the Chola Empire under Rajendra. This temple has a larger Siva linga than the one at Thanjavur but the Vimana of this temple is smaller in height than the Thanjavur vimana.

The Chola period is also remarkable for its sculptures and bronzes all over the world. Among the existing specimens in museums around the world and in the temples of South India may be seen many fine figures of Siva in various forms, such as Vishnu and his consort Lakshmi, and the Siva saints. Though conforming generally to the iconographic conventions established by long tradition, the sculptors worked with great freedom in the 11th and the 12th centuries to achieve a classic grace and grandeur. The best example of this can be seen in the form of Nataraja the Divine Dancer.

=== Hoysalas ===
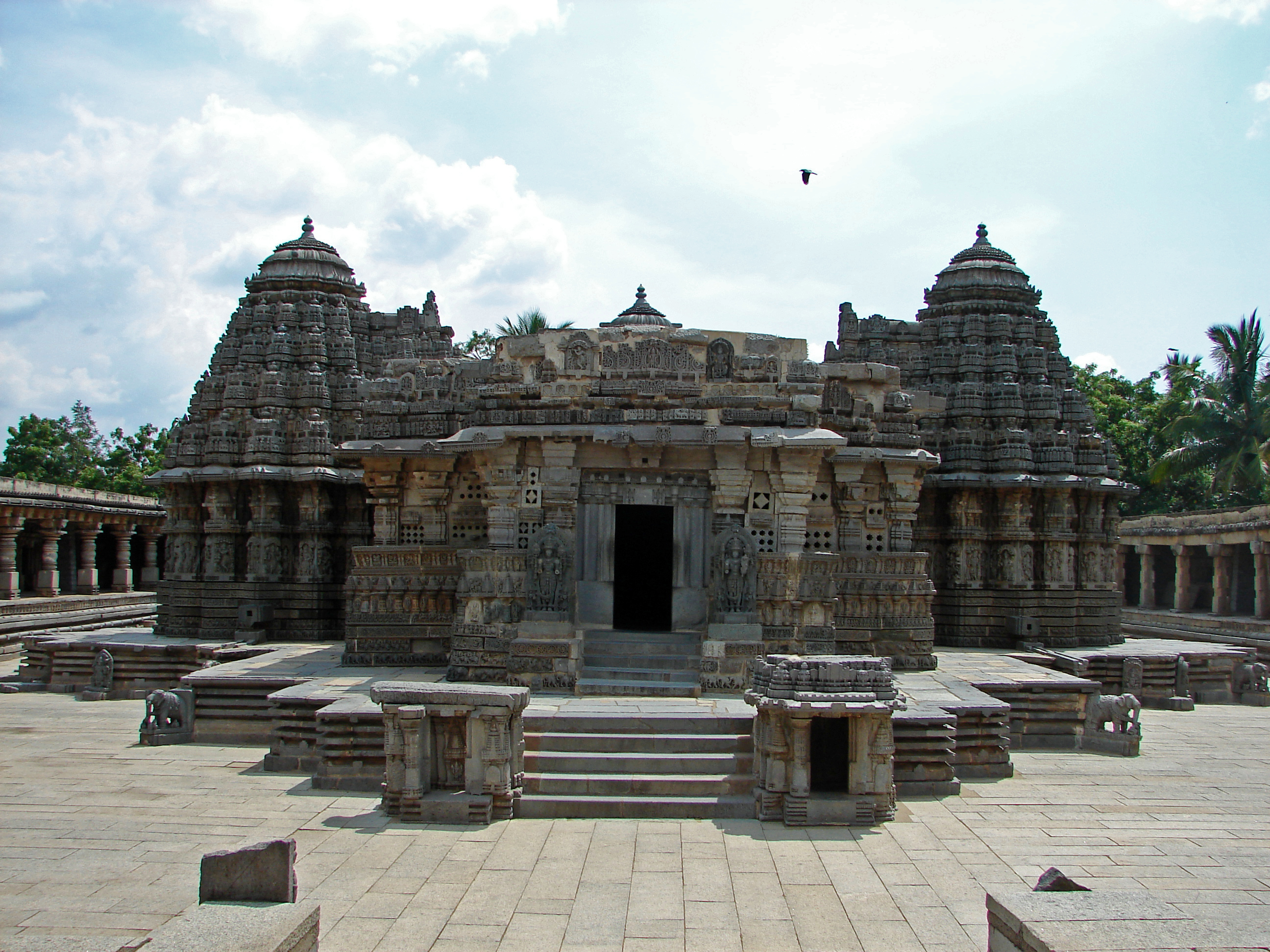
Symmetrical architecture on Jagati, Somanathapura, Karnataka

The Hoysala kings ruled southern India during the period (1100–1343 CE) from their capital Belur and later Halebidu in Karnataka and developed a unique idiom of architecture called the Hoysala architecture in Karnataka state. The finest examples of their architecture are the Chennakesava Temple in Belur, Hoysaleswara temple in Halebidu, and the Kesava Temple in Somanathapura.

The modern interest in the Hoysalas is due to their patronage of art and architecture rather than their military conquests. The brisk temple building throughout the kingdom was accomplished despite constant threats from the Pandyas to the south and the Seunas Yadavas to the north. Their architectural style, an offshoot of the Western Chalukya style, shows distinct Dravidian influences. The Hoysala architecture style is described as Karnata Dravida as distinguished from the traditional Dravida, and is considered an independent architectural tradition with many unique features.

=== Vijayanagara ===
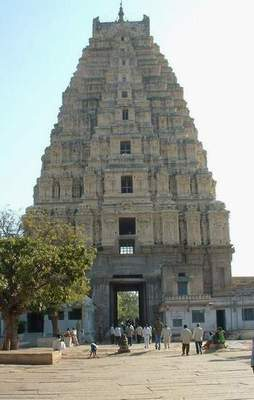
Virupaksha Temple at Hampi, Karnataka

The whole of South India was ruled by Vijayanagara Empire from (1343–1565 CE), who built a number of temples and monuments in their hybrid style in their capital Vijayanagara in Karnataka. Their style was a combination of the styles developed in South India in the previous centuries. In addition, the Yali columns (pillar with charging horse), balustrades (parapets) and ornate pillared manatapa are their unique contribution. King Krishna Deva Raya and others built many famous temples all over South India in Vijayanagara Architecture style.

Vijayanagara architecture is a vibrant combination of the Chalukya, Hoysala, Rashtrakuta, Pallava, Pandya and Chola styles, idioms that prospered in previous centuries. Its legacy of sculpture, architecture and painting influenced the development of the arts long after the empire came to an end. Its stylistic hallmark is the ornate pillared Kalyanamantapa (marriage hall), Vasanthamantapa (open pillared halls) and the Rayagopura (tower). Artisans used the locally available hard granite because of its durability since the kingdom was under constant threat of invasion. While the empire's monuments are spread over the whole of Southern India, nothing surpasses the vast open-air theatre of monuments at its capital at Vijayanagara, a UNESCO World Heritage Site.

In the 14th century the kings continued to build Vesara or Deccan style monuments but later incorporated dravida-style gopurams to meet their ritualistic needs. The Prasanna Virupaksha temple (underground temple) of Bukka Raya I and the Hazare Rama temple of Deva Raya I are examples of Deccan architecture. The varied and intricate ornamentation of the pillars is a mark of their work. At Hampi, though the Vitthala temple is the best example of their pillared Kalyanamantapa style, the Hazara Ramaswamy temple is a modest but perfectly finished example. A visible aspect of their style is their return to the simplistic and serene art developed by the Chalukya dynasty. A grand specimen of Vijayanagara art, the Vitthala temple, took several decades to complete during the reign of the Tuluva kings.

=== Kerala ===
The version of Dravidian architecture found in Kerala in the far south-west is significantly different. Very large temples are rare, and sloping roofs with projecting eaves dominate the outline, often arranged in a number of tiers. As in Bengal, this is an adaption to the heavy monsoon rainfall. There is usually a stone core below a timber superstructure. The architecture of Kerala goes back to the Chera dynasty in the 12th century, and a variety of ground plans have been used, including circular ones. The development of multi-building complexes came relatively late.

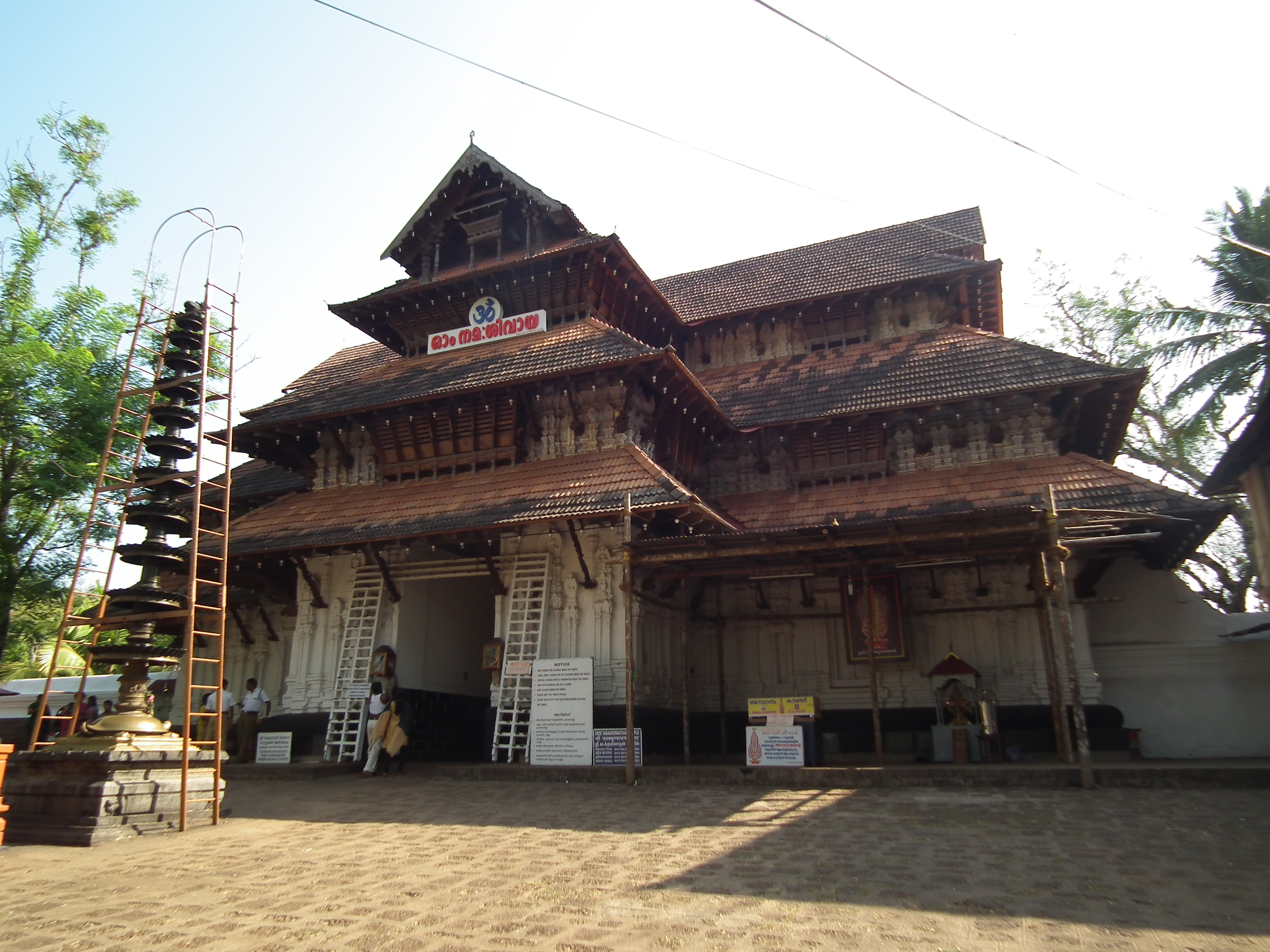
Vadakkunnathan Temple

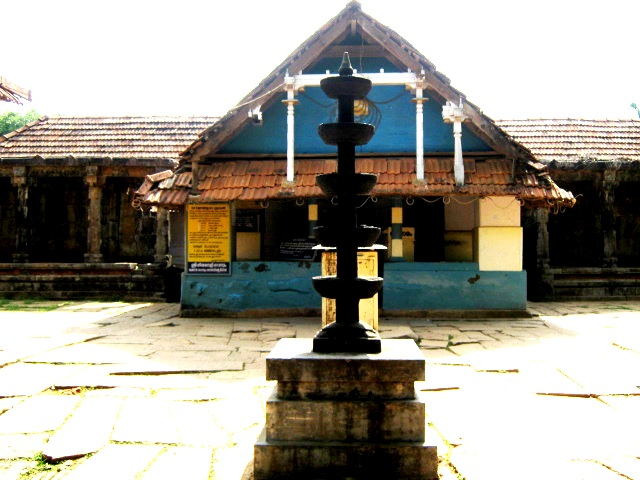
Thirunelli Temple front view

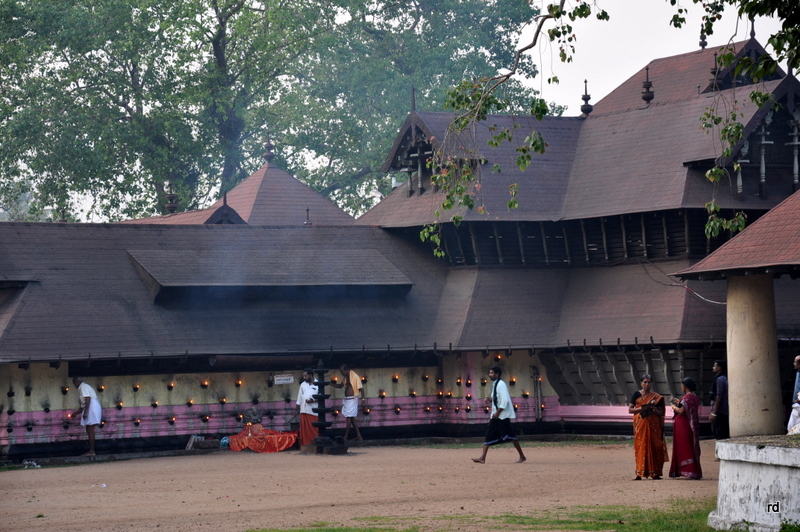
Kodungallur Bhagavathy Temple

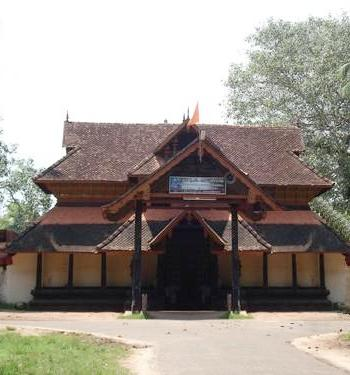
Kandiyoor Sree Mahadeva Temple

=== Sri Lanka ===
The culture of Sri Lanka is recognizable in architecture. The city of Jaffna was close to South India and the majority of the inhabitants of Jaffna have a Dravidian origin. In former royal city of Nallur, there are architectural ruins of Jaffna kingdom.

From the 18th century, Dravidian architecture was heavily adopted by Tamil-speaking populations of Sri Lanka for the construction of Hindu religious sites.

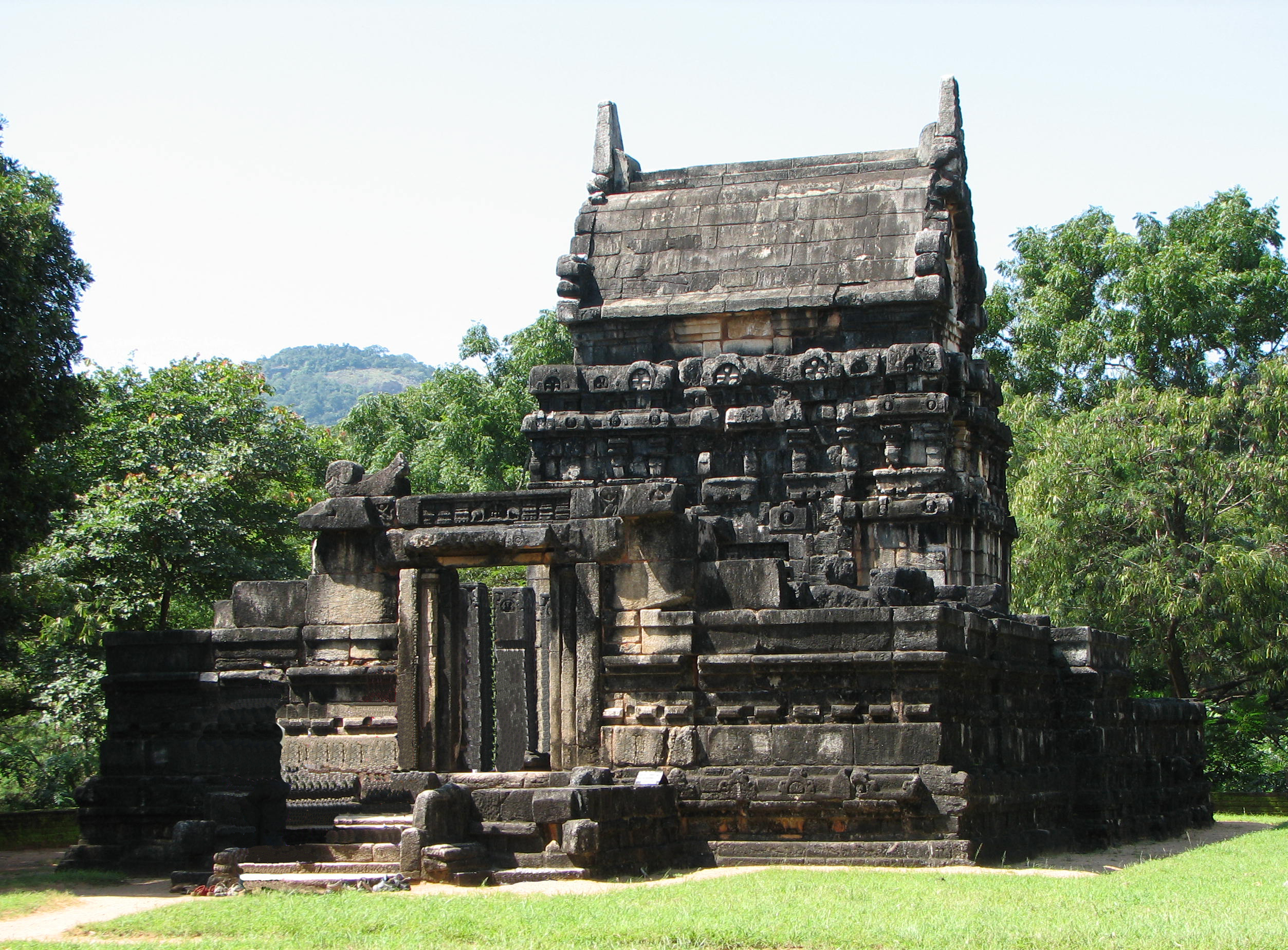
The Nalanda Gedige, a Buddhist temple built between the 8th and 10th centuries, in a predominant Pallava style Dravidian architecture.

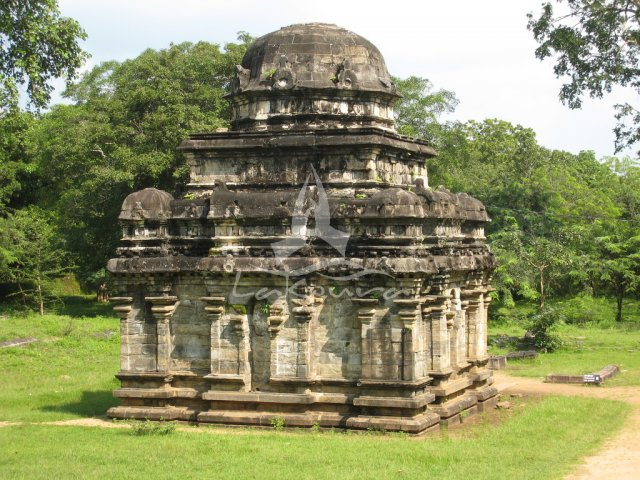
The second Shiva Devale (Shiva temple) of Polonnaruwa, built under the Chola occupation period in 10th century.

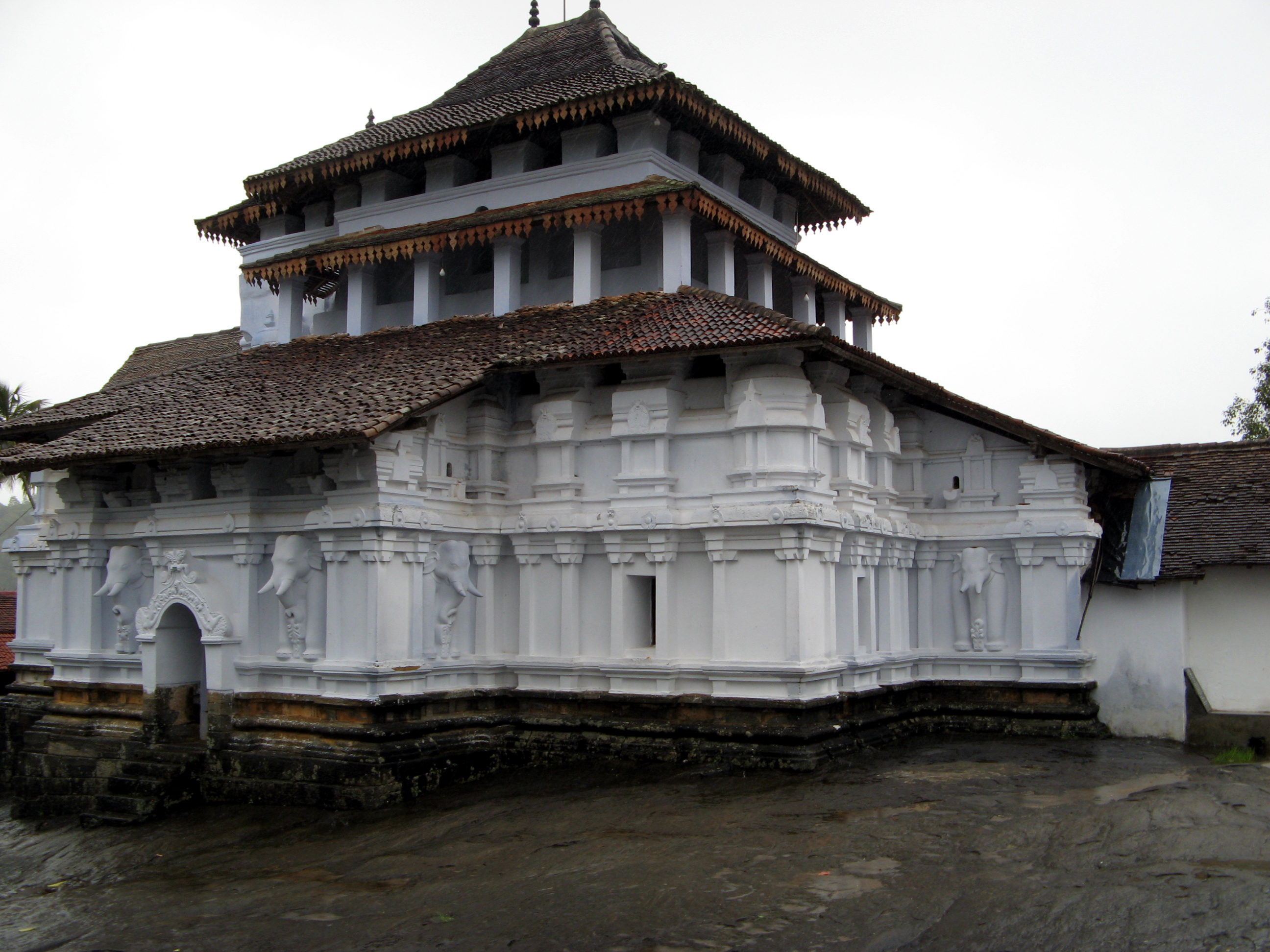
The Lankatilaka Vihara, a 14th-century building influenced by Dravidian architecture, designed and involving an architect and craftsmen from South India.

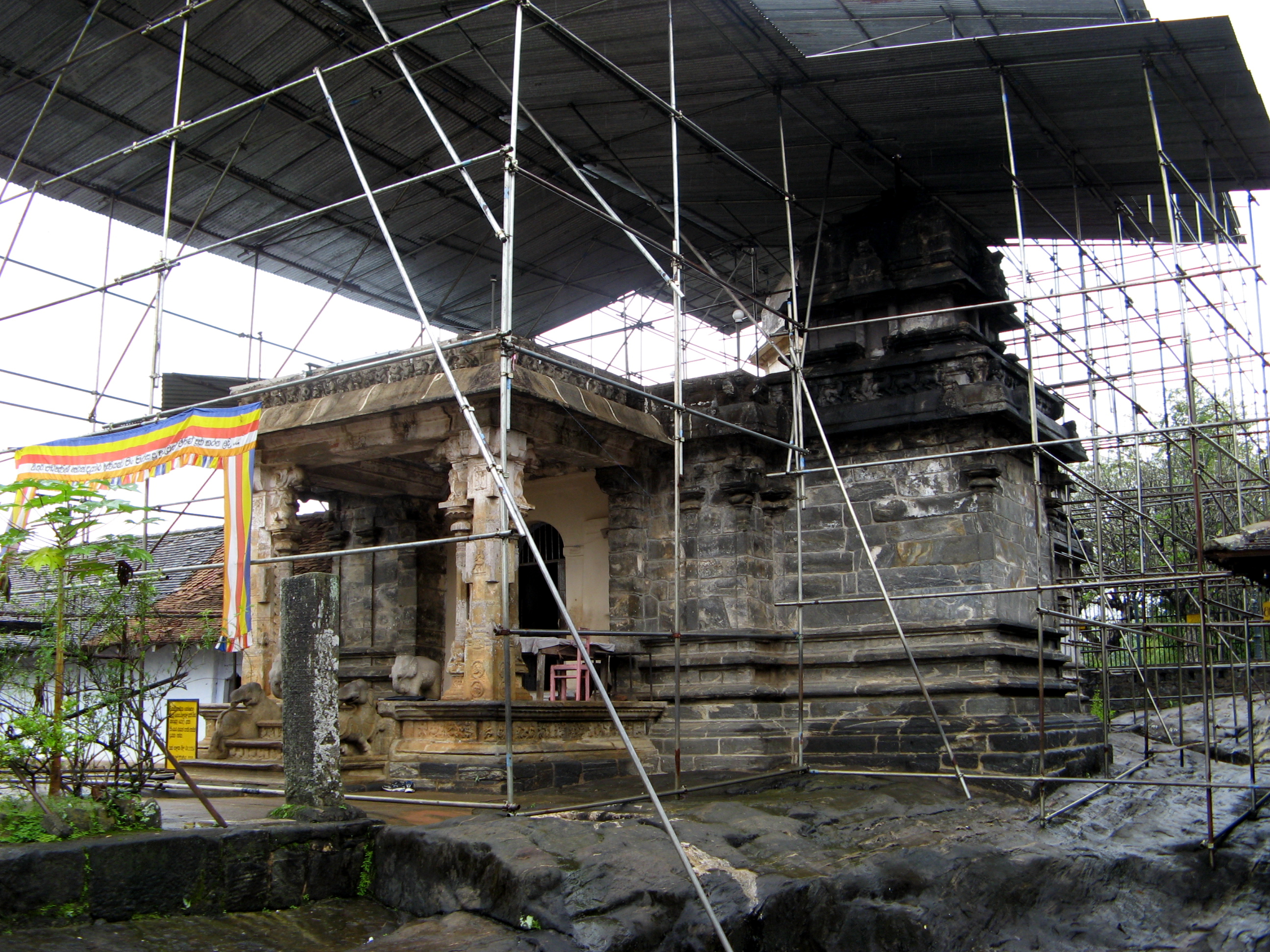
The Devale aside Gadaladeniya Vihara main shrine, built under the Gampola period, with South Indian architect and craftsmen.

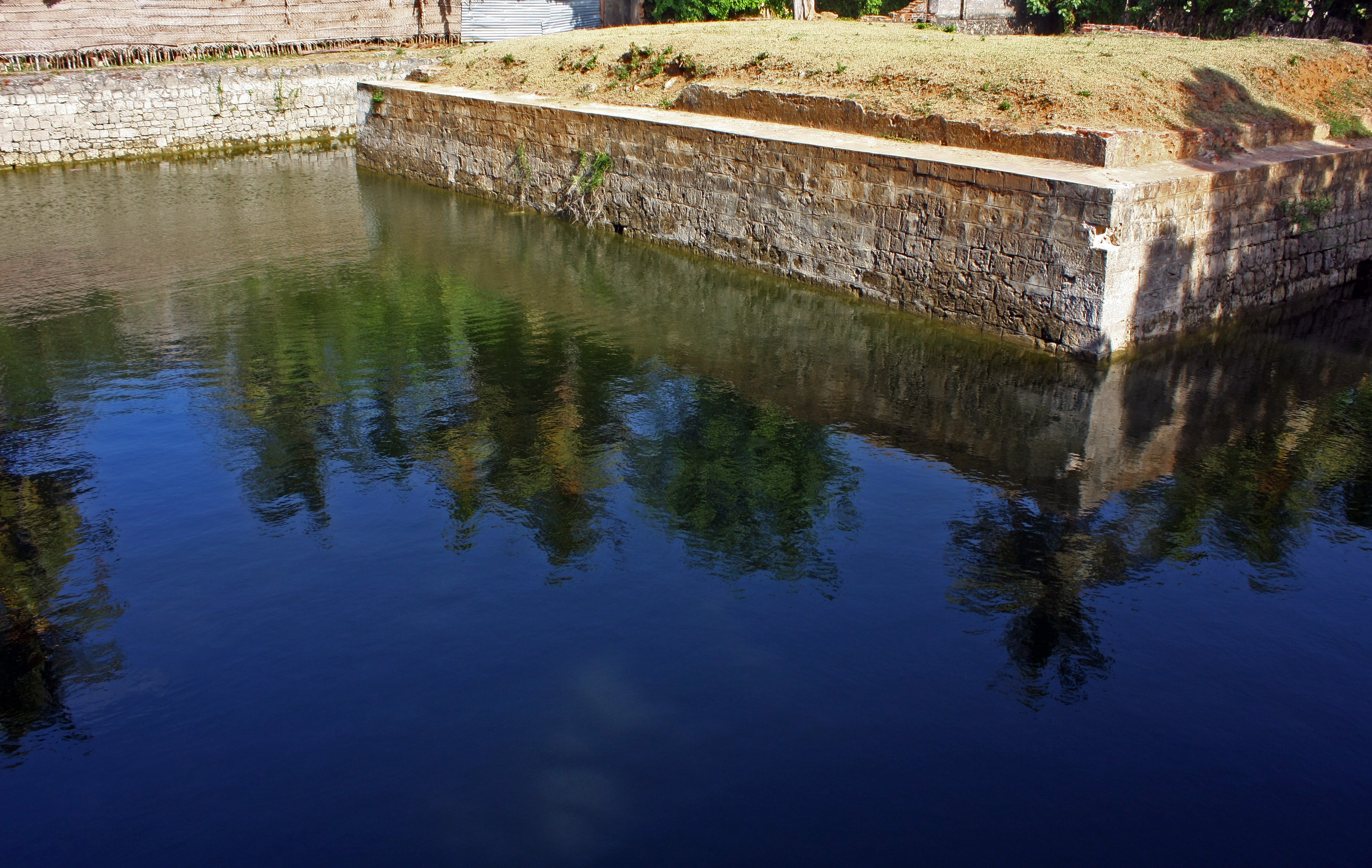
Yamuna Eri, a 15th-century pond in Nallur.

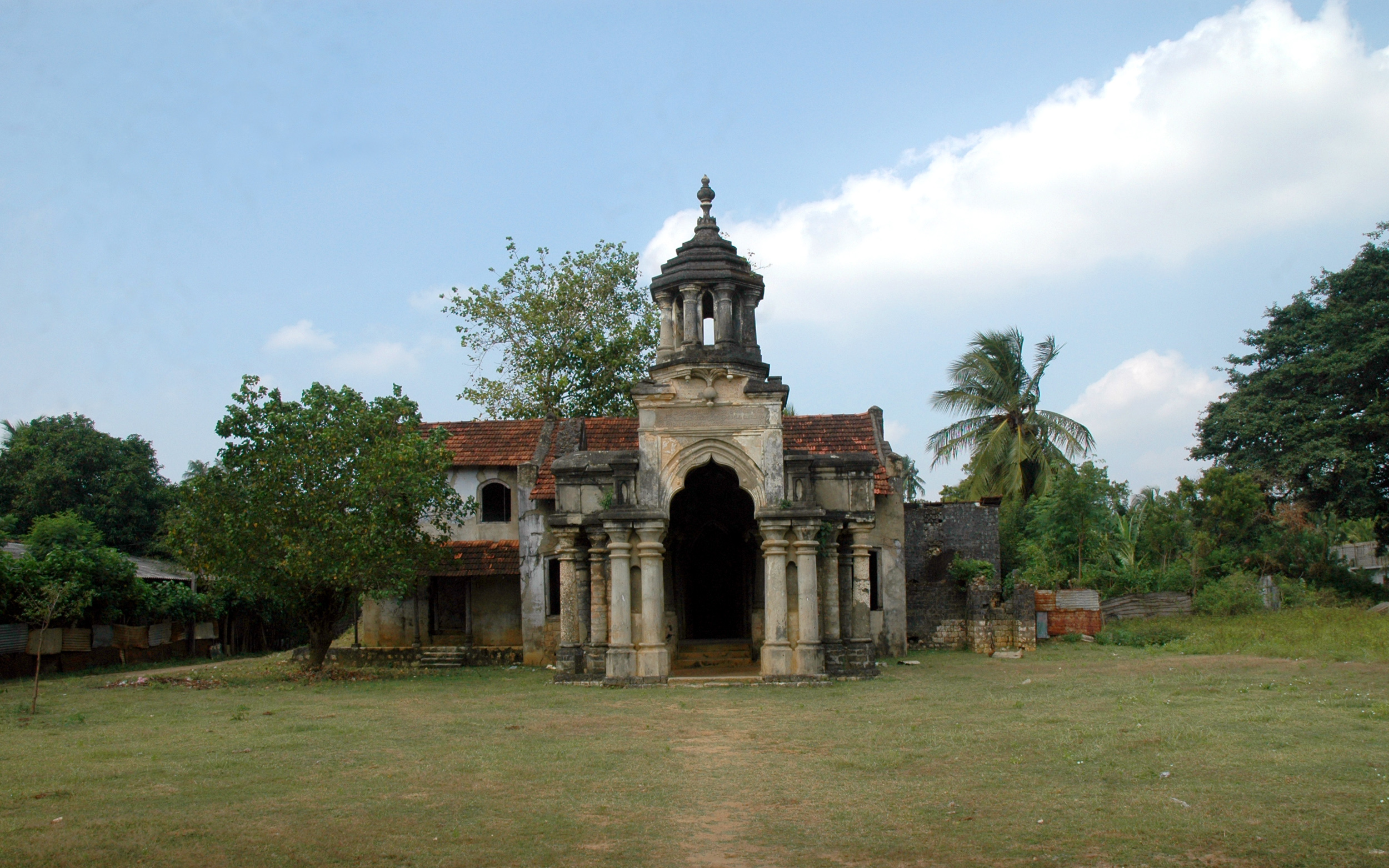
Mantri Manai, the remains of the minister's quarters of Jaffna Kingdom. It is built in a Euro-Dravidian style.

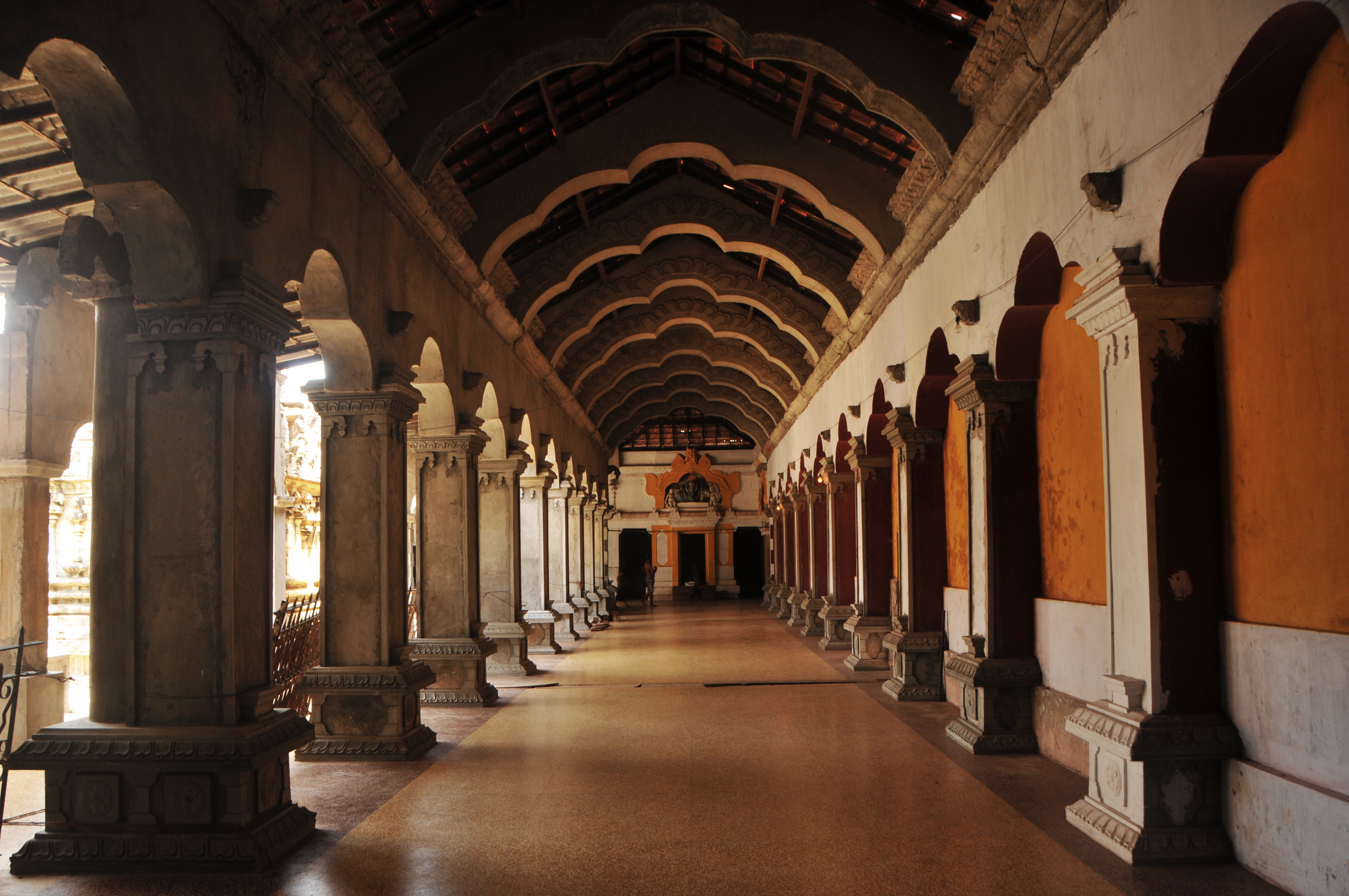
Corridor of Naguleswaram Temple

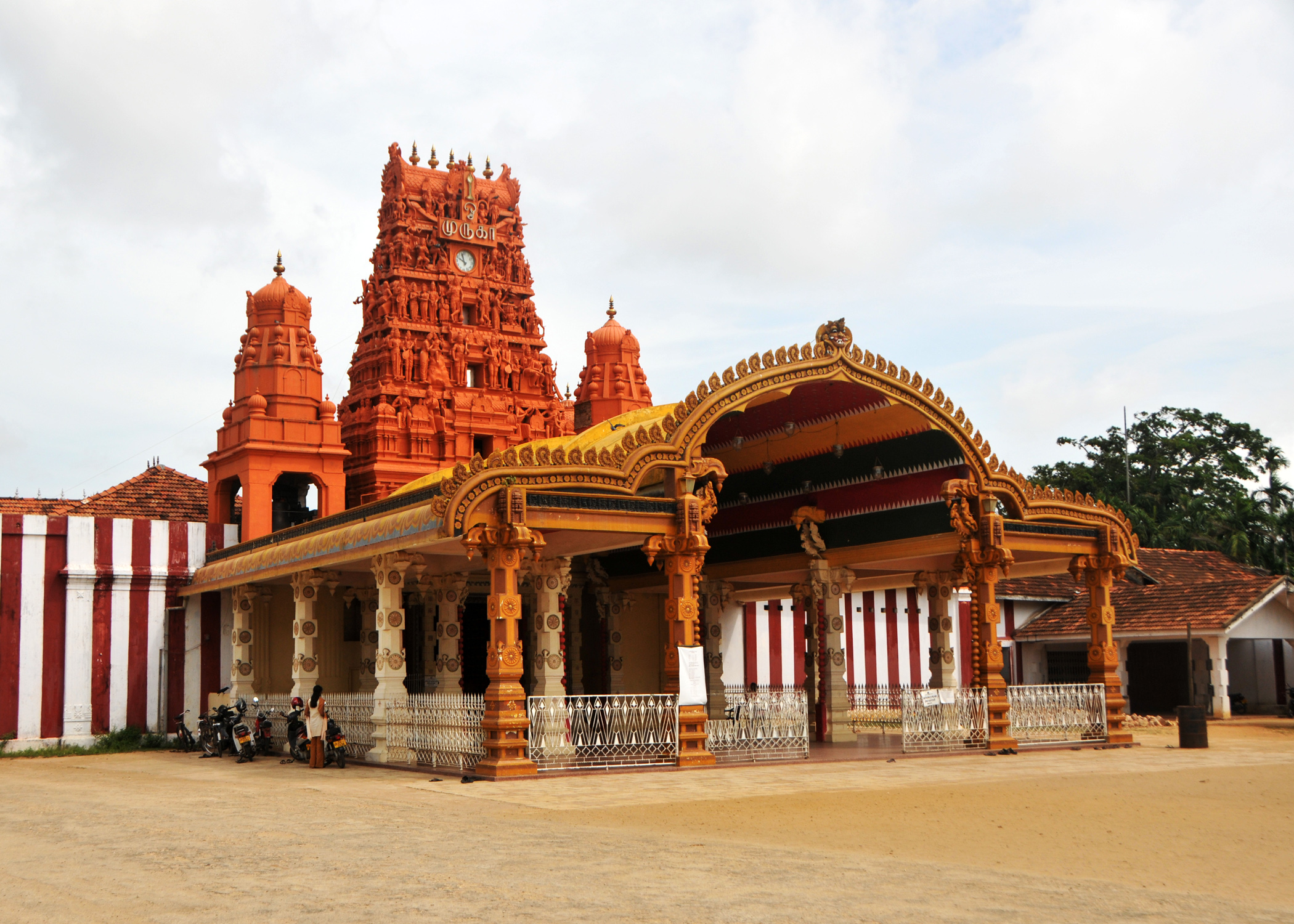
Nallur Kandaswamy temple front entrance

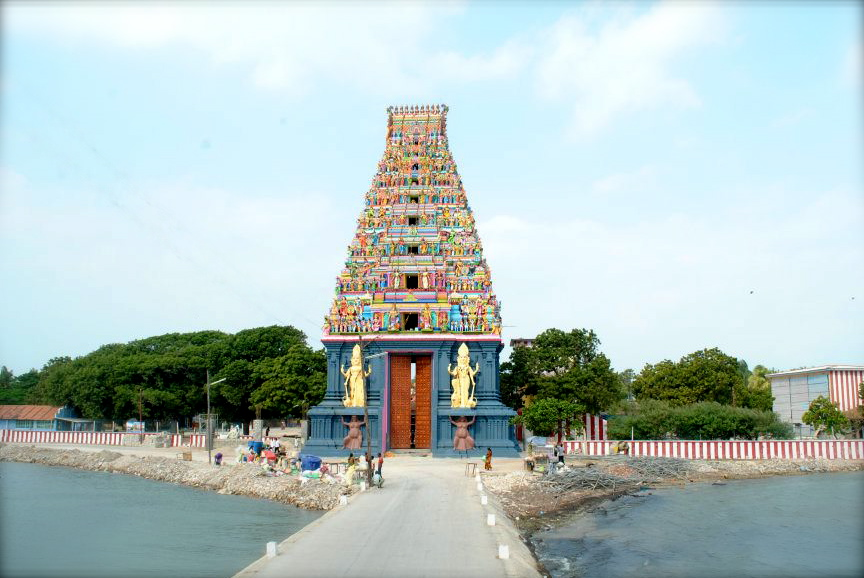
Raja Gopuram of Nainativu Nagapooshani Amman Temple.

== See also ==
- Hindu temples – South India and Tamil Nadu
- Hindu temple architecture – Dravidian style
- Koyil – Hindu temples in Dravidian architectural style.
