= Sharan Prakash Patil =

Indian politician

Dr. Sharanaparakash Rudrappa Patil

Cabinet Minister, Government of Karnataka
- Incumbent
- Assumed office 27 May 2023
- Governor: Thawarchand Gehlot
- Cabinet: Second Siddaramaiah ministry; Shivakumar ministry
- Chief Minister: Siddaramaiah; D. K. Shivakumar
- Ministry and Departments: Medical Education; Skill Development
- In office 19 May 2013 – 15 May 2018
- Governor: H. R. Bhardwaj; Konijeti Rosaiah; Vajubhai Vala
- Cabinet: First Siddaramaiah ministry
- Chief Minister: Siddaramaiah
- Ministry and Departments: Medical Education
- Preceded by: S.A. Ramdas
- Succeeded by: D. K. Shivakumar

Member of Karnataka Legislative Assembly
- Incumbent
- Assumed office 2023
- Preceded by: Rajkumar Patil
- Constituency: Sedam
- In office 2004–2018
- Preceded by: Basavanathareddy Motakpalli
- Succeeded by: Rajkumar Patil
- Constituency: Sedam

Personal details
- Born: 20 April 1967 (age 59) Udagi, Karnataka
- Party: Indian National Congress

Dr. Sharanaparakash Rudrappa Patil (Kannada: ಡಾ. ಶರಣ ಪ್ರಕಾಶ್ ಪಾಟೀಲ್, also known as Sharan Prakash Patil) is an Indian politician from Karnataka. He is Minister for Medical Education in the Government of Karnataka and member of Karnataka Legislative Assembly representing Sedam constituency.

== Political Reception ==
Dr. Patil has committed that the Government of Karnataka will continue to focus on improvement of healthcare and education.

He has assured to also start the trauma center in Kalaburgi District within three months time.

== Career ==
Dr. Patil was a 3 time MLA, representing the Sedam constituency in Kalaburagi. He is a doctor by profession and holds a master's degree in dermatology. He won in Karnataka Assembly Election held in 2023, for 4th time.
