= Adki =

- village
- Adki is in Gulbarga district

- Location in Karnataka, India Adki (India)
- Coordinates: 17°07′N 77°22′E
- Country: India
- State: Karnataka
- District: Gulbarga
- Talukas: Sedam

Government
  - Body: Village Panchayat

Languages
  - Official: Kannada
- Time zone: UTC+5:30 (IST)
- Nearest city: Gulbarga
- Civic agency: Village Panchayat

Adki is a village in the southern state of Karnataka, India. It is located in the Sedam taluk of Kalaburagi district.

== See also ==
- Gulbarga
- Districts of Karnataka
