= Sedam Assembly constituency =

Constituency of the Karnataka Legislative Assembly

Coordinates: 17.18°N 77.28°E

Sedam
- Constituency No. 41 for the Karnataka Legislative Assembly

Constituency details
- Country: India
- Region: South India
- State: Karnataka
- District: Kalaburagi
- Lok Sabha constituency: Gulbarga
- Established: 1956
- Total electors: 225,688
- Reservation: None

Member of Legislative Assembly
- 16th Karnataka Legislative Assembly
- Incumbent Sharan Prakash Patil
- Party: Indian National Congress
- Elected year: 2023

Sedam Assembly constituency is one of 224 assembly constituencies in Karnataka in India. It is part of Gulbarga Lok Sabha constituency.

== Members of the Legislative Assembly ==
Election	Member	Party
1952	J. K. Praneshchari	Indian National Congress
1957	Kollur Mallappa	Indian National Congress
1957	Jamadanda Papiah Sarvesh	Independent politician
1962	Jamadanda Papiah Sarvesh	Indian National Congress
1967	Jamadanda Papiah Sarvesh	Swatantra Party
1972	Jamadanda Papiah Sarvesh	Indian National Congress
1978	Sher Khan	Indian National Congress
1983	Nagareddy Patil Sedam	Bharatiya Janata Party
1985	Chandershekhar Reddy Deshmukh Madna	Independent politician
1989	Basavanathareddy Motakpalli	Indian National Congress
1994	Chandrashekar Reddy Deshmukh Madna	Janata Dal
1999	Basavanathareddy Motakpalli	Indian National Congress
2004	Dr. Sharan Prakash Patil	Indian National Congress
2008	Dr. Sharan Prakash Patil	Indian National Congress
2013	Dr. Sharan Prakash Patil	Indian National Congress
2018	Rajkumar Patil	Bharatiya Janata Party
2023	Dr. Sharan Prakash Patil	Indian National Congress

== Election results ==
=== Assembly Election 2023 ===
2023 Karnataka Legislative Assembly election : Sedam
Party	Candidate	Votes	%	±%
INC	Dr. Sharan Prakash Patil	93,377	53.06%	▲6.73
BJP	Rajkumar Patil	49,816	28.31%	▼22.56
JD(S)	Balraj Guttedar	21,125	12.00%	▲10.69
KRPP	G. Lallesh Reddy	6,712	3.81%	New
AAP	Shankar Bandi Sulepeth	1,441	0.82%	New
NOTA	None of the above	691	0.39%	▼0.40
Margin of victory		43,561	24.75%	▲20.21
Turnout		176,062	78.01%	▲4.26
Total valid votes		175,997		
Registered electors		225,688		▲4.90
INC gain from BJP		Swing	▲2.19	

=== Assembly Election 2018 ===
2018 Karnataka Legislative Assembly election : Sedam
Party	Candidate	Votes	%	±%
BJP	Rajkumar Patil	80,668	50.87%	▲14.01
INC	Dr. Sharan Prakash Rudrappa Patil	73,468	46.33%	▼1.06
JD(S)	Sunita Mahantesh Talawar Malkhed	2,075	1.31%	▼22.63
NOTA	None of the above	1,260	0.79%	New
AIMEP	Rekha Dayanand Hulasagud	1,099	0.69%	New
Margin of victory		7,200	4.54%	▼5.99
Turnout		158,677	73.75%	▲0.33
Total valid votes		158,570		
Registered electors		215,147		▲16.16
BJP gain from INC		Swing	▲3.48	

=== Assembly Election 2013 ===
2013 Karnataka Legislative Assembly election : Sedam
Party	Candidate	Votes	%	±%
INC	Dr. Sharan Prakash Patil	53,546	47.39%	▲10.16
BJP	Rajkumar Patil	41,651	36.86%	▲4.92
JD(S)	Mukram Khan	27,047	23.94%	▲4.83
KJP	Vaijnath Patil	6,148	5.44%	New
Independent	Venkatesh Maruti Mengaji	2,034	1.80%	New
BSP	Shivsharnappa Mailari	1,589	1.41%	▼0.71
Independent	Mohammed Ali Baba Saheb	1,141	1.01%	New
Margin of victory		11,895	10.53%	▲5.24
Turnout		135,978	73.42%	▲8.21
Total valid votes		112,983		
Registered electors		185,212		▲7.84
INC hold		Swing	▲10.16	

=== Assembly Election 2008 ===
2008 Karnataka Legislative Assembly election : Sedam
Party	Candidate	Votes	%	±%
INC	Dr. Sharan Prakash Patil	41,686	37.23%	▲9.41
BJP	Rajkumar Patil Telkur	35,762	31.94%	▲8.89
JD(S)	Mukram Khan	21,396	19.11%	▼5.54
Independent	Naresh Malkud	8,854	7.91%	New
BSP	Dr. Kumar Swamy Kodli	2,370	2.12%	▼17.93
SP	Sirajoddin	1,913	1.71%	New
Margin of victory		5,924	5.29%	▲2.12
Turnout		111,995	65.21%	▲4.31
Total valid votes		111,981		
Registered electors		171,750		▲10.02
INC hold		Swing	▲9.41	

=== Assembly Election 2004 ===
2004 Karnataka Legislative Assembly election : Sedam
Party	Candidate	Votes	%	±%
INC	Dr. Sharan Prakash Patil	26,424	27.82%	▼26.66
JD(S)	Chandrashekar Reddy Deshmukh Madna	23,413	24.65%	▲16.12
BJP	Rajkumar Patil	21,892	23.05%	New
BSP	Mukram Khan	19,041	20.05%	▲17.76
JP	Dr. Venkatreddy Patil Kolkunda	4,218	4.44%	New
Margin of victory		3,011	3.17%	▼26.02
Turnout		95,071	60.90%	▼4.08
Total valid votes		94,988		
Registered electors		156,105		▲16.67
INC hold		Swing	▼26.66	

=== Assembly Election 1999 ===
1999 Karnataka Legislative Assembly election : Sedam
Party	Candidate	Votes	%	±%
INC	Basavanathareddy Motakpalli	44,210	54.48%	▲23.40
JD(U)	Chandrashekar Reddy Deshmukh Madna	20,526	25.29%	New
JD(S)	Dr. Shivashankar Tallalli	6,920	8.53%	New
Independent	Srinivas Deshpande	6,025	7.42%	New
BSP	Ramanna Peerappa Yelli	1,859	2.29%	New
Independent	Shankar Kodla	1,609	1.98%	New
Margin of victory		23,684	29.19%	▲13.15
Turnout		86,934	64.98%	▲0.38
Total valid votes		81,149		
Rejected ballots		5,755	6.62%	▲2.94
Registered electors		133,796		▲5.69
INC gain from JD		Swing	▲7.36	

=== Assembly Election 1994 ===
1994 Karnataka Legislative Assembly election : Sedam
Party	Candidate	Votes	%	±%
JD	Chandrashekar Reddy Deshmukh Madna	37,118	47.12%	▲17.33
INC	Baswanthreddy Motakpalli	24,485	31.08%	▼25.36
BJP	Shivaraj Patil Sedam	5,776	7.33%	▲4.70
INC	Kamanna Wachha	4,198	5.33%	New
CPI(M)	C. A. Patil	3,331	4.23%	New
KRRS	Mallanna Mallappa Natekar	1,783	2.26%	New
Independent	Mallikarjun Arjunappa Satnoor	957	1.21%	New
Independent	Ramanna Khewaji	795	1.01%	New
Margin of victory		12,633	16.04%	▼10.61
Turnout		81,778	64.60%	▲0.75
Total valid votes		78,768		
Rejected ballots		3,010	3.68%	▼2.25
Registered electors		126,587		▲8.26
JD gain from INC		Swing	▼9.32	

=== Assembly Election 1989 ===
1989 Karnataka Legislative Assembly election : Sedam
Party	Candidate	Votes	%	±%
INC	Basavanathareddy Motakpalli	39,641	56.44%	▲28.67
JD	Chandrashekhar Reddy Deshmukh	20,925	29.79%	New
JP	Naseeroddin Khurshid	4,888	6.96%	New
Kranti Sabha	Narsingrao Dheemsenrao Bheemanhalli	1,965	2.80%	New
BJP	K. Venkatayya	1,847	2.63%	▼19.77
Independent	Bhojappa	969	1.38%	New
Margin of victory		18,716	26.65%	▲12.75
Turnout		74,660	63.85%	▲7.80
Total valid votes		70,235		
Rejected ballots		4,425	5.93%	▲3.15
Registered electors		116,928		▲26.51
INC gain from Independent		Swing	▲14.78	

=== Assembly Election 1985 ===
1985 Karnataka Legislative Assembly election : Sedam
Party	Candidate	Votes	%	±%
Independent	Chandershekhar Reddy Madna	20,982	41.66%	New
INC	Sher Khan	13,984	27.77%	▼13.77
BJP	Nagreddy Lachmareddy Patil	11,282	22.40%	▼23.67
JP	Abdul Majeed	1,581	3.14%	▼3.07
Independent	Bhojanna Chanderappa	815	1.62%	New
Independent	Tippanna Mukhadi	716	1.42%	New
LKD	Beerlingappa Pujari	593	1.18%	New
Independent	Naseeroddin Khurshid	408	0.81%	New
Margin of victory		6,998	13.90%	▲9.38
Turnout		51,803	56.05%	▼0.69
Total valid votes		50,361		
Rejected ballots		1,442	2.78%	▼0.41
Registered electors		92,425		▲12.44
Independent gain from BJP		Swing	▼4.41	

=== Assembly Election 1983 ===
1983 Karnataka Legislative Assembly election : Sedam
Party	Candidate	Votes	%	±%
BJP	Nagareddy Patil Sedam	20,800	46.07%	New
INC	Sher Khansab Tafjul Hussain Khan	18,757	41.54%	▲24.81
JP	Shivalingappa Alias Salimoddin	2,802	6.21%	▼31.75
Independent	Bjojanna Lachmappa	2,794	6.19%	New
Margin of victory		2,043	4.52%	▼2.84
Turnout		46,639	56.74%	▼10.09
Total valid votes		45,153		
Rejected ballots		1,486	3.19%	▼0.18
Registered electors		82,201		▲7.38
BJP gain from INC(I)		Swing	▲0.76	

=== Assembly Election 1978 ===
1978 Karnataka Legislative Assembly election : Sedam
Party	Candidate	Votes	%	±%
INC(I)	Sher Khan	22,397	45.31%	New
JP	Baswanth Reddy	18,761	37.96%	New
INC	Saireddy Rudrappa Patil	8,270	16.73%	▼33.07
Margin of victory		3,636	7.36%	▲4.28
Turnout		51,154	66.83%	▲13.28
Total valid votes		49,428		
Rejected ballots		1,726	3.37%	▲3.37
Registered electors		76,549		▲25.44
INC(I) gain from INC		Swing	▼4.49	

=== Assembly Election 1972 ===
1972 Mysore State Legislative Assembly election : Sedam
Party	Candidate	Votes	%	±%
INC	Jamadanda Papiah Sarvesh	15,682	49.80%	▲4.15
INC(O)	Bhojappa Mogalappa	14,713	46.72%	New
ABJS	Mahadevappa Shivalingappa	1,095	3.48%	New
Margin of victory		969	3.08%	▼1.62
Turnout		32,678	53.55%	▼0.89
Total valid votes		31,490		
Registered electors		61,026		▲20.77
INC gain from SWA		Swing	▼0.55	

=== Assembly Election 1967 ===
1967 Mysore State Legislative Assembly election : Sedam
Party	Candidate	Votes	%	±%
SWA	Jamadanda Papiah Sarvesh	13,173	50.35%	▲9.27
INC	G. Tippanna	11,943	45.65%	▼13.27
RPI	L. R. Lakkappa	1,045	3.99%	New
Margin of victory		1,230	4.70%	▼13.14
Turnout		27,508	54.44%	▲14.98
Total valid votes		26,161		
Registered electors		50,529		▲12.30
SWA gain from INC		Swing	▼8.57	

=== Assembly Election 1962 ===
1962 Mysore State Legislative Assembly election : Sedam
Party	Candidate	Votes	%	±%
INC	Jamadanda Papiah Sarvesh	10,012	58.92%	▲7.06
SWA	Devendra Kumar	6,981	41.08%	New
Margin of victory		3,031	17.84%	▲14.12
Turnout		17,756	39.46%	▲1.86
Total valid votes		16,993		
Registered electors		44,993		▼56.61
INC hold		Swing	▲7.06	

=== Assembly Election 1957 ===
1957 Mysore State Legislative Assembly election : Sedam
Party	Candidate	Votes	%	±%
INC	Kollur Mallappa	20,220	51.86%	▼12.27
Independent	Vishwanath Reddy Rachangouda	18,768	48.14%	New
Independent	Jamadanda Papiah Sarvesh			
Margin of victory		1,452	3.72%	▼38.03
Turnout		38,988	37.60%	▼2.45
Total valid votes		38,988		
Registered electors		103,685		▲65.33
Independent gain from INC		Swing	▼15.99	

=== Assembly Election 1952 ===
1952 Hyderabad State Legislative Assembly election : Tandur Serum
Party	Candidate	Votes	%	±%
INC	J. K. Praneshchari	16,109	64.13%	New
Socialist Party (India)	Sidramappa	5,623	22.39%	New
RPI	Tukaram	3,386	13.48%	New
Margin of victory		10,486	41.75%	
Turnout		25,118	40.05%	
Total valid votes		25,118		
Registered electors		62,713		
INC win (new seat)				

== See also ==
List of constituencies of the Karnataka Legislative Assembly
