= Handerki =

Handerki Handaraki
- Village
- Location within Karnataka Location within India
- Coordinates: 16°58′4″N 77°15′5″E
- Country: India
- State: Karnataka
- District: Kalaburagi district
- Taluk: Sedam
- Lok Sabha Constituency: Gulbarga

Population (2001)
  - Total: 3,663

Languages
  - Official: Kannada
- Time zone: UTC+5:30 (IST)
- PIN: 585 222
- Vehicle registration: KA 32

Handerki is a village in the Sedam taluk of Kalaburagi district in the Indian state of Karnataka.

== Demographics ==
Per the 2011 Census of India, has a total population of 4002; of whom 1995 are male and 2007 female.

== History ==
Handaraki is famous for the ancient Lokeshwara temple and Janameshwara temple located in the village.

== See also ==
- Manyakheta
- Udagi
- Sedam
- Gulbarga
- Karnataka
