= Malkhed Fort =

Fortress in Karnataka

Coordinates: 17°11′36″N 77°09′24″E

Manyaketa Fort
- Malkheda, Kalaburagi district, Karnataka, India
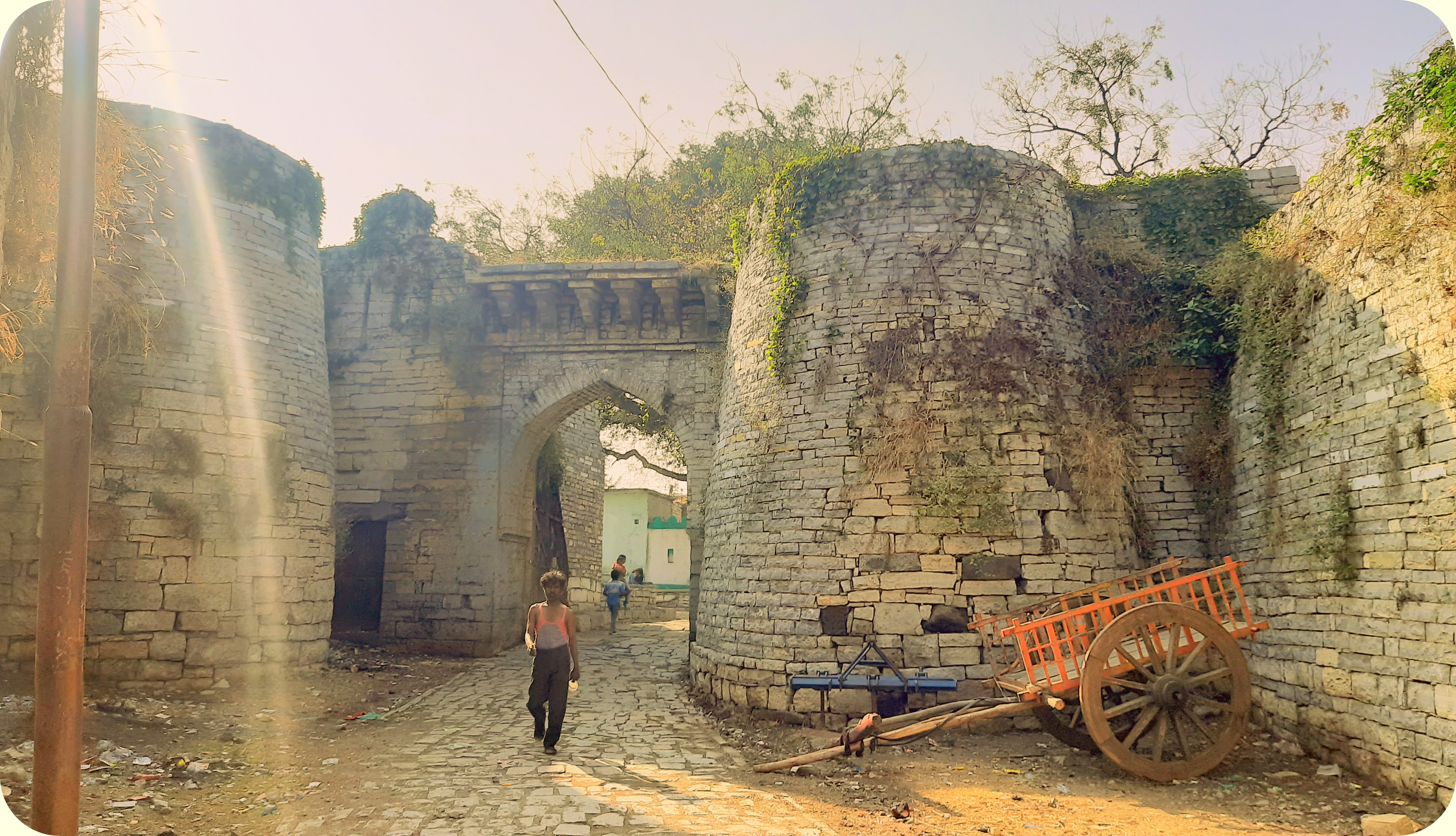

Site information
- Type: Fortress
- Controlled by: Government of Karnataka
- Open to the public: yes
- Condition: Ruins

Location
- Height: 20 feet

Site history
- Built: 9th Century
- Built by: Amoghavarsha I (Rashtrakuta Empire)
- Materials: Limestone

The Malkhed Fort, (also known as the Manyakheta Fort) is located on the banks of the Kagina River in the district of Gulbarga in the state of Karnataka, India. Its construction attributed to the Rashtrakuta Emperor Amoghavarsha I. Manyakheta was the capital of the Rashtrakuta Empire from 814 AD to 968 AD, and after they were overthrown, it became the capital of the Western Chalukya Empire. The fort has four entrances and 52 bastions, and is over 20 feet tall. A Jumma Masjid and few dargahs can be found here.
