= Rajkumar Patil =

Indian politician

Rajkumar Patil Telkur

Member of the Karnataka Legislative Assembly.
- In office 2018–2023
- Preceded by: Sharan Prakash Patil
- Succeeded by: Sharan Prakash Patil
- Constituency: Sedam

D.C.C. Bank Kalaburgi and Yadgiri
- Preceded by: Basavaraj A. Patil

Personal details
- Born: Rajkumar Patil Telkur; 5 July 1977 (age 49) Sedam
- Party: Bharatiya Janata Party
- Spouse: Santoshi Rani
- Children: Shubham Patil, Sanvi Patil
- Education: BA from Nrupatunga Degree College Sedam

Rajkumar Patil (Rajkumar Patil Telkur, born 5 July 1977) is an Indian politician and former Member of the Legislative Assembly from the Sedam constituency Karnataka, chairman of N.E.K.R.T.C., President of D.C.C. Bank Kalaburgi and Yadgiri.

== Life and education ==
Rajkumar Patil was born in Telkur, Sedam taluka Kalaburagi. He went to the government school at Telkur and then came to Sedam to complete his BA from Nrupatunga Degree College Sedam.

== Positions ==
Patil contested as BJP candidate and lost in 2004, 2008 and 2013 assembly elections from Sedam constituency Karnataka. Patil in 2018 Assembly elections, from Sedam constituency won against Sharan Prakash Patil Congress candidate, by margin of 7200 votes.
