= Sedam railway station =

Railway station in Karnataka, India

Sedam Hedimba
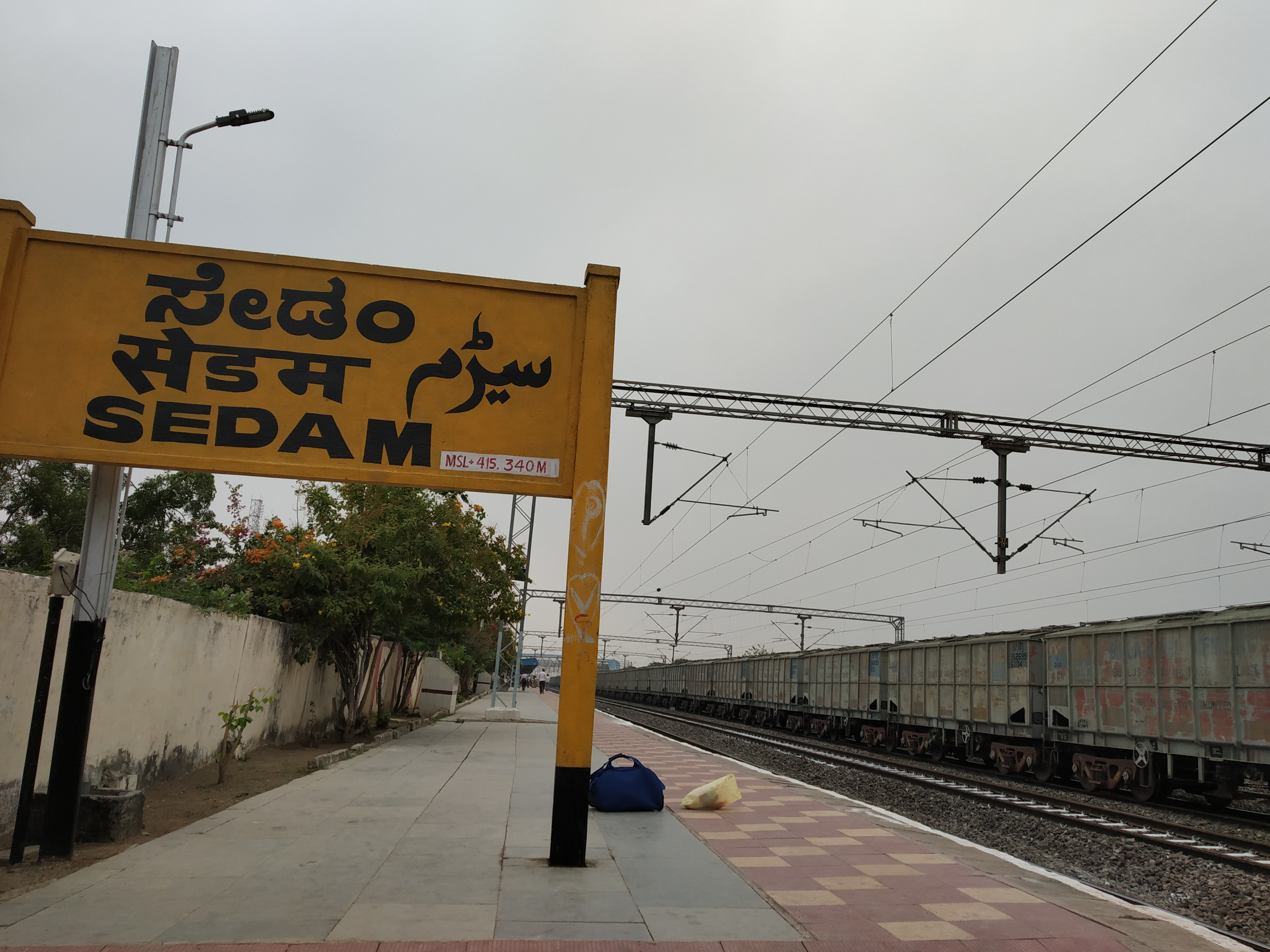

General information
- Location: Railway Station Rd, Sedam, Kalaburagi District, Karnataka; India
- Coordinates: 17°10′52″N 77°17′07″E
- Elevation: 633 m (2,077 ft)
- System: Indian Railways station
- Line: Begumpet–Wadi
- Platforms: 2
- Tracks: 4 5 ft 6 in (1,676 mm) broad gauge

Construction
- Structure type: Standard (on-ground station)
- Parking: Available

Other information
- Status: Functioning
- Station code: SEM
- Zone(s): South Central Railway,
- Division(s): Secunderabad Division
Location
- Location within Karnataka Location within India

Sedam railway station, (also known as Seram railway station), (station code: SEM) is an Indian Railway station in Sedam the town of Kalaburagi District in Indian state of Karnataka. It is located on the Begumpet–Wadi line of Secunderabad railway division in South Central Railway zone.

== History ==
The Wadi–Secunderabad line was built in 1874 with financing by the Nizam of Hyderabad. It later became part of Nizam's Guaranteed State Railway

== Structure and expansion ==
Sedam railway station has two platforms and four tracks each running to 650 meter in length, a general and reservation booking office, shelters, lighting, benches, parking, foot overbridge, waiting room and toilet facility.

Preceding station	Indian Railways	Following station
Kurgunta (KQT) towards ?	South Central Railway zone Begumpet–Wadi	Malkhaid Road (MQR) towards ?
