= Udagi =

Udagi Oodagi
- Village
- Location within Karnataka Location within India
- Coordinates: 17°8′36″N 77°13′4″E
- Country: India
- State: Karnataka
- District: Kalaburagi district
- Taluk: Sedam
- Lok Sabha Constituency: Gulbarga

Languages
  - Official: Kannada
- Time zone: UTC+5:30 (IST)
- PIN: 585 222
- Vehicle registration: KA 32

Udagi (also spelled as Oodagi) is a village in the Sedam taluk of Gulbarga district in the Indian state of Karnataka.

== History ==
Udagi is famous for the 10th century Kalokeshwara temple located in the village.

The village was in news in October 2025 due to a religious banner which said, "I love Muhammad".

== See also ==
- Manyakheta
- Handaraki
- Sedam
- Gulbarga
- Karnataka
