= Sand box (civil engineering) =

Term

A sandbox or sand jack is a device used for removing the centering of an arch. Each prop is mounted on a sand box. After the plug is removed, the sand pours from the box, causing the centering to move downwards, diminishing the pressure from the arch, and enabling to ultimately remove it.
