= Kurgunta =

- city
- Location in Karnataka, India
- Coordinates: 17.2°N 77.35°E
- Country: India
- State: Karnataka
- District: Kalaburagi
- Elevation: 418 m (1,371 ft)

Population (2001)
  - Total: 8,584

Languages
  - Official: Kannada
- Time zone: UTC+5:30 (IST)
- ISO 3166 code: IN-KA
- Vehicle registration: KA
- Website: karnataka.gov.in

Kurgunta is a census town in kalaburagi district in the Karnataka state of India.

== Geography ==
Kurgunta is located at 17.2°N 77.35°E. It has an average elevation of 418 meters (1,371 feet).

== Demographics ==
As of 2001 India census, Kurgunta had a population of 8,584. Males constituted 51% of the population and females 49%. Kurgunta had an average literacy rate of 51%, lower than the national average of 59.5%: male literacy was 61%, and female literacy was 40%. 13% of the population were under 6 years of age.
