= Malkheda =

Malkheda Manyakheta
- Location in Karnataka, India Malkheda (India)
- Coordinates: 17°11′42″N 77°9′39″E
- Country: India
- State: Karnataka
- District: Kalaburagi district
- Taluk: Sedam
- Lok Sabha Constituency: Kalaburagi
- Established: 9th Century CE

Government
  - Type: Gram
  - Body: Panchayat of Malkheda

Population (2001)
  - Total: 11,180

Languages
  - Official: Kannada
- Time zone: UTC+5:30 (IST)
- PIN CODE: 585 317
- Vehicle registration: KA 32

Malkheda originally known as Manyakheta (IAST: Mānyakheṭa, Prakrit: "Mannakheḍa"), and also known as Malkhed, is a town in Karnataka, India. It is located on the banks of Kagina river in Sedam Taluk of Kalaburagi district, around 40 km from Kalaburagi.

The city reached the peak of its prosperity during the 9th and 10th centuries, serving as the Imperial capital of the Rashtrakutas and historical heart of Jainism where most Jain present at the time. At Manyakheta, there is a historical fort whose restoration is in progress based on a proposal submitted by HKADB (Hyderabad Karnataka Area Development Board).

== Demographics ==
As of 2001 India census, Malkheda had a population of 11,180 with 5,679 males and 5,501 females and 2,180 households.

== History ==
Illustration of the Rashtrakuta Empire and its territories, along with the Pala Empire and the Gurjara-Pratihara Empire during the 9th and 10th centuries.

Manyakheta rose to prominence when the capital of Rashtrakutas was moved from Mayurkhandi in present-day Bidar district to Mānyakheṭa during the reign of Amoghavarsha I. He is said to have built the imperial capital city to "match that of Lord Indra". The capital city was planned to include elaborately designed buildings for the royalty using the finest of workmanship. After the fall of the Rāṣṭrakūṭas, it remained the capital of their successors, the Kalyani Chalukyas or Western Chalukyas until about 1050 CE. According to Dhanapāla's Pāiyalacchi, the city was sacked by the Paramāra king Harṣa Sīyaka in CE 972-73, the year he completed that work.

Manyakheta is home to two ancient institutions.

- The Jain Bhattaraka Math. The temple of Neminath (9th century CE). The pillars and walls of the temple date back to between the 9th and 11th centuries. The idols include tirthankaras, choubisi (24 tirthankaras), Nandishwar dvipa and idols of yakshi. There is a famous panchdhatu shrine with 96 images. In the same temple, there are other historical images. The last bhaṭṭāraka of the Malkheda seat who reigned during the year 1950–61, was Bhaṭṭāraka Devendrakīrti.
- The famous Mahapurana (Adipurana and Uttarapurana) was composed here by Acharya Jinasena and his pupil Gunabhadra in the 9th century. The mathematics text Ganita Saara Sangraha was written here by Mahaviracharya.

The renowned Apabhramsha poet Pushapadanta lived here.

From 814 CE to 968 CE Manyakheta rose to prominence when the capital of Rashtrakuta Empire was moved from Mayurkhandi in present-day Bidar district to Mānyakheṭa during the reign of Amoghavarsha I (Nrupatunga Amoghavarsha), who ruled for 64 years and wrote Kavirajamarga the first classical Kannada work. Amoghavarsha I a Jain ruler, patronised several Jain scholars, including the mathematician Mahaviracharya and intellectuals Ajitasenacharya, Gunabhadracharya, and Jinasenacharya, who contributed to the development of Kannada literature during his reign. This period is often regarded as a high point in the development of Kannada literary culture. According to Dhanapāla's Pāiyalacchi, the city was sacked by the Paramāra king Harṣa Sīyaka in 972–73 CE, the year he completed that work. In the year 1007 CE, Rajendra Chola destroyed the capital as per inscription in Tanjore Big Temple. Most probably the destruction was so much that today nobody knows the exact location where the Rashtrakuta's capital existed. After the fall of the Rāṣṭrakūṭas, it remained the capital of their successors, the Kalyani Chalukyas or Western Chalukyas until about 1050 CE. It was later ruled by the Indic Kalyani Chalukyas, Southern Kalachuris, Cholas, Yadavas, Kakatiyas and the Turko-Persian Delhi Sultanate, Bahmani Sultanate, Bidar Sultanate, Bijapur Sultanate, Mughal Empire and Nizam of Hyderabad by 1948.

== Transport ==
Malkheda is well connected by road and rail. Malkheda lies on State Highway 10. Malkaheda is 40 km southeast to the District Headquarters Kalaburagi district and 12 km west to the Taluk Headquarters Sedam. There is also a railway station near the village, Malkhaid Road.

== See also ==
- Udagi
- Kalaburagi district
- Shorapur
- Basava Kalyana
- Bidar
