= Sedam =

- Sedam Taluk
- Sedam
- Location in Karnataka, India
- Coordinates: 17.183°N 77.283°E
- Country india: India
- State: Karnataka
- District: Kalaburagi
- Lok Sabha Constituency: Gulbarga

Area
  - Total: 5.5 km^{2} (2.1 sq mi)

Population (2011)
  - Total: 39,341
  - Rank: Sedam
  - Density: 5,734.36/km^{2} (14,851.9/sq mi)

Languages
  - Official: Kannada
- Time zone: UTC+5:30 (IST)
- PIN: 585318
- 585318: 08441
- Vehicle registration: KA 32

Sedam or Seram is a town in Kalaburagi district in the Indian state of Karnataka. It is also the headquarters of the Sedam Taluka.

== Demographics ==
Sedam is a Town Municipal Council city and divided into 23 wards for which elections are held every 5 years. The Sedam Town Municipal Council has population of 39,341 of which 19,816 are males while 19,525 are females as per report released by Census India 2011.

== Economy ==
Sedam is famous for its Shahabad stones which are used for construction. Many quarries and mines are there in Sedam to sell these stones (both uncut and polished). Five cement factories are also present in Sedam taluk: Vasavadatta cement unit of Birla Shakti Cement in Sedam, Ultratech Cement a unit of Rajashree cement in Malkhed, South India Cement ltd Malkhed.Shree cement at Kodla Benakanahalli village, CCI Kurgunta. The food grain industry is also big here, especially with Toor dal being sent to far away places like Tamil Nadu.

== Geography ==
The town is spread over an area of 5.5 square kilometres (2.1 sq mi). Sedam Taluk shares borders with three Talukas in the Gulbarga district: Chitapur Taluka to the west, Chincholi Taluka to the north and Yadgir district to the south. It also borders Tandur Taluk of the Rangareddy District of Telangana and Kodangal Taluk of the Mahbubnagar District in Telangana to the east. Sedam taluk is located in the eastern part of the district.

== History ==
Sedam in ancient times was known as Hedimba. Sedam was ruled by Rashtrakutas and Kalyani Chalukyas. Some of the ancient temples in Sedam town are Madhava Trilingeshwara Eshwara Temple, Kottala Basaveshwara Temple, Manvikeshwara Temple, Panchalingeshwara Temple, Bananti Kambha, Jwalamukhi statues and Ganapa Navakoti Narayana Temple, Panduranga Temple, Karadagiri Hanuman Temple, Laxmi Narayan Temple, Hingulambika Temple, Sadesab Darga, Masjid-e-Mahal, Mecca Masjid. Sedam also has an ancient fort, Ganesh temple in Ganesh nagar. Near to Sedam about 12–14 km away, there is a place called Ranjol with a famous masjid. Sedam also has some Jain cave ruins possibly from the time of the Rashtrakuta Dynasty. Near to Sedam, about 20–25 km away, there is place called Benakanhalli with famous Chandaneshawar temple.

== Transport ==
=== Road ===
Sedam is well connected by road. It is 150 km from Hyderabad, the capital of Telangana State. It is connected to Gulbarga, the district headquarters which is 50 km away. Yadgir is 55 km away. Gulbarga Airport is on the Sedam - Gulbarga Road.

=== Rail ===
Sedam lies on the Hyderabad-Mumbai route and Delhi-Bangalore Route. A number of trains pass through Sedam railway station.

== See also ==
- Gulbarga
- Sedam railway station
- Handaraki
- Manyakheta
- Udagi
