= Afzalpur Assembly constituency =

Legislative Assembly constituency in Karnataka State, India

Coordinates: 17.2°N 76.36°E

Afzalpur
- Constituency No. 34 for the Karnataka Legislative Assembly

Constituency details
- Country: India
- Region: South India
- State: Karnataka
- Division: Kalaburagi
- District: Kalaburagi
- Lok Sabha constituency: Gulbarga
- Established: 1951
- Total electors: 228,171
- Reservation: None

Member of Legislative Assembly
- 16th Karnataka Legislative Assembly
- Incumbent M. Y. Patil
- Party: INC
- Elected year: 2023
- Preceded by: Malikayya Guttedar

Afzalpur is one of the 224 Legislative Assembly constituencies of Karnataka state in India. It is in Kalaburagi district and is a segment of Gulbarga Lok Sabha constituency.

== Members of the Legislative Assembly ==
Election	Member	Party
1952	Anna Rao Basappa Ganamukhi	Indian National Congress
1957	Anna Rao Basappa Ganamukhi	Indian National Congress
1962	Anna Rao Basappa Ganamukhi	Indian National Congress
1967	N. S. Patil	Indian National Congress
1972	Digambar Rao Balwantrao	Indian National Congress
1978	Moreshwar Yashwantrao Patil	Janata Party
1983	Hanumantrao Desai	Janata Party
1985	Malikayya Guttedar	Indian National Congress
1989	Malikayya Guttedar	Indian National Congress
1994	Malikayya Guttedar	Indian National Congress
1999	Malikayya Guttedar	Indian National Congress
2004	Moreshwar Yashwantrao Patil	Janata Dal
2008	Malikayya Guttedar	Indian National Congress
2013	Malikayya Guttedar	Indian National Congress
2018	Moreshwar Yashwantrao Patil	Indian National Congress
2023	Moreshwar Yashwantrao Patil	Indian National Congress

== Election results ==
=== Assembly Election 2023 ===
2023 Karnataka Legislative Assembly election : Afzalpur
Party	Candidate	Votes	%	±%
INC	Moreshwar Yashwantrao Patil	56,313	35.12%	▼12.80
Independent	Nitin Venkayya Guttedar	51,719	32.26%	New
BJP	Malikayya Guttedar	31,394	19.58%	▼21.26
SP	R. D. Patil	8,686	5.42%	New
JD(S)	Shivakumar M. Natikar	8,153	5.09%	▼3.82
NOTA	None of the above	1,608	1.00%	▲0.17
Margin of victory		4,594	2.87%	▼4.21
Turnout		161,257	70.67%	▲2.58
Total valid votes		160,322		
Registered electors		228,171		▲3.71
INC hold		Swing	▼12.80	

=== Assembly Election 2018 ===
2018 Karnataka Legislative Assembly election : Afzalpur
Party	Candidate	Votes	%	±%
INC	Moreshwar Yashwantrao Patil	71,735	47.92%	▲21.57
BJP	Malikayya Guttedar	61,141	40.84%	▲33.68
JD(S)	Raju Gouda Revoor	13,340	8.91%	▼6.89
NOTA	None of the above	1,243	0.83%	New
Margin of victory		10,594	7.08%	▲3.46
Turnout		149,812	68.09%	▲0.20
Total valid votes		149,708		
Registered electors		220,007		▲15.59
INC hold		Swing	▲21.57	

=== Assembly Election 2013 ===
2013 Karnataka Legislative Assembly election : Afzalpur
Party	Candidate	Votes	%	±%
INC	Malikayya Guttedar	38,093	26.35%	▼21.48
KJP	Moreshwar Yashwantrao Patil	32,855	22.73%	New
JD(S)	Vitthal Heroor	22,847	15.80%	▲12.62
SP	Govind Vishwanath Bhat	14,643	10.13%	New
BJP	Dilip. R. Patil	10,347	7.16%	▼33.16
Independent	Mallappa. M. Solapur	1,829	1.27%	New
Independent	Shrishail Sidramappa Kalkeri	1,364	0.94%	New
Independent	Somshekhar. J. Deshmukh	1,171	0.81%	New
BSP	Huchappa Vathar Gour	1,039	0.72%	▼3.62
Margin of victory		5,238	3.62%	▼3.89
Turnout		129,224	67.89%	▲9.14
Total valid votes		144,563		
Registered electors		190,336		▲6.78
INC hold		Swing	▼21.48	

=== Assembly Election 2008 ===
2008 Karnataka Legislative Assembly election : Afzalpur
Party	Candidate	Votes	%	±%
INC	Malikayya Guttedar	50,082	47.83%	▲13.63
BJP	Moreshwar Yashwantrao Patil	42,216	40.32%	▲32.78
BSP	Ravi. M. Shetty (Motagi)	4,540	4.34%	▲2.62
JD(S)	Tukaramgoud Sahebgoud Patil	3,327	3.18%	▼49.24
Independent	Mahadev Siddaram	1,726	1.65%	New
Independent	Awate. S. B	1,441	1.38%	New
LJP	Ramesh Sulekar	742	0.71%	New
Rashtriya Hindustan Sena Karnataka	Chandrashekhar Bassappa	638	0.61%	New
Margin of victory		7,866	7.51%	▼10.71
Turnout		104,712	58.75%	▼0.02
Total valid votes		104,712		
Registered electors		178,243		▲3.37
INC gain from JD(S)		Swing	▼4.59	

=== Assembly Election 2004 ===
2004 Karnataka Legislative Assembly election : Afzalpur
Party	Candidate	Votes	%	±%
JD(S)	Moreshwar Yashwantrao Patil	53,122	52.42%	▲14.26
INC	Malikayya Guttedar	34,654	34.20%	▼1.83
BJP	Dr. Indira Shakti	7,641	7.54%	▲1.55
BSP	Huchhappa Basanna Gour	1,741	1.72%	▼10.79
Independent	Mahantappa. S. Talawar	1,370	1.35%	New
Independent	Mallikarjun Shivappa Minchin	1,053	1.04%	New
JP	Shankargouda Patil Udachan	734	0.72%	New
Margin of victory		18,468	18.22%	▲16.09
Turnout		101,342	58.77%	▼3.78
Total valid votes		101,342		
Registered electors		172,427		▲17.10
JD(S) hold		Swing	▲14.26	

=== Assembly Election 1999 ===
1999 Karnataka Legislative Assembly election : Afzalpur
Party	Candidate	Votes	%	±%
JD(S)	Malikayya Guttedar	32,896	38.16%	New
INC	Moreshwar Yashwantrao Patil	31,061	36.03%	▼8.03
BSP	Vitthal Heroor	10,789	12.51%	New
Independent	Huchappa Gour	6,183	7.17%	New
BJP	Sidramappa Siddappa Hirukurubar	5,168	5.99%	▲2.08
Margin of victory		1,835	2.13%	▼3.08
Turnout		92,108	62.55%	▲2.03
Total valid votes		86,212		
Rejected ballots		5,851	6.35%	▲3.65
Registered electors		147,247		▲6.83
JD(S) gain from INC		Swing	▼11.11	

=== Assembly Election 1994 ===
1994 Karnataka Legislative Assembly election : Afzalpur
Party	Candidate	Votes	%	±%
INC	Malikayya Guttedar	39,924	49.27%	New
INC	Moreshwar Yashwantrao Patil	35,703	44.06%	▼11.51
BJP	Annarao Duttargaon Pattan	3,170	3.91%	New
JD	Hanumantrao Desai	1,894	2.34%	▼4.12
Margin of victory		4,221	5.21%	▼13.18
Turnout		83,421	60.52%	▼0.87
Total valid votes		81,034		
Rejected ballots		2,255	2.70%	▼3.42
Registered electors		137,839		▲13.74
INC gain from INC		Swing	▼6.30	

=== Assembly Election 1989 ===
1989 Karnataka Legislative Assembly election : Afzalpur
Party	Candidate	Votes	%	±%
INC	Malikayya Guttedar	38,810	55.57%	▼6.83
JP	Goudappa Sangram Rao	25,964	37.17%	New
JD	Subhash Patil Gudur	4,510	6.46%	New
Independent	Gurushant Pattedar	560	0.80%	New
Margin of victory		12,846	18.39%	▼8.12
Turnout		74,397	61.39%	▼3.76
Total valid votes		69,844		
Rejected ballots		4,553	6.12%	▲3.72
Registered electors		121,186		▲23.99
INC hold		Swing	▼6.83	

=== Assembly Election 1985 ===
1985 Karnataka Legislative Assembly election : Afzalpur
Party	Candidate	Votes	%	±%
INC	Malikayya Guttedar	38,777	62.40%	▲23.85
JP	Hanumantrao Desai	22,304	35.89%	▼13.12
Independent	Devindrappa Shivappa Harijan	1,063	1.71%	New
Margin of victory		16,473	26.51%	▲16.06
Turnout		63,675	65.15%	▲5.43
Total valid votes		62,144		
Rejected ballots		1,531	2.40%	▼0.59
Registered electors		97,736		▲12.59
INC gain from JP		Swing	▲13.39	

=== Assembly Election 1983 ===
1983 Karnataka Legislative Assembly election : Afzalpur
Party	Candidate	Votes	%	±%
JP	Hanumantrao Desai	24,648	49.01%	▲1.49
INC	Moreshwar Yashwantrao Patil	19,390	38.55%	▲32.82
LKD	Syed Abdul Gaffar Jamhoor	3,237	6.44%	New
Independent	Gunderaya Peerappa Landankar	688	1.37%	New
Independent	Shantappa Doddamani	645	1.28%	New
Independent	Shivasharanappa Siddappa Hosmani	509	1.01%	New
Independent	Santaji Rao Babu Rao Patil	441	0.88%	New
Independent	Chandrasha. L. Hadgil	399	0.79%	New
Independent	Mahantappa Basanna Angadi	339	0.67%	New
Margin of victory		5,258	10.45%	▲9.68
Turnout		51,845	59.72%	▼6.51
Total valid votes		50,296		
Rejected ballots		1,549	2.99%	▼0.70
Registered electors		86,809		▲10.46
JP hold		Swing	▲1.49	

=== Assembly Election 1978 ===
1978 Karnataka Legislative Assembly election : Afzalpur
Party	Candidate	Votes	%	±%
JP	Moreshwar Yashwantrao Patil	23,823	47.52%	New
INC(I)	Hanumantrao Desai	23,436	46.75%	New
INC	Babu Rao	2,873	5.73%	▼47.50
Margin of victory		387	0.77%	▼5.69
Turnout		52,051	66.23%	▲11.94
Total valid votes		50,132		
Rejected ballots		1,919	3.69%	▲3.69
Registered electors		78,586		▲10.97
JP gain from INC		Swing	▼5.71	

=== Assembly Election 1972 ===
1972 Mysore State Legislative Assembly election : Afzalpur
Party	Candidate	Votes	%	±%
INC	Digambar Rao Balwantrao	19,729	53.23%	▼18.94
INC(O)	Anna Rao Madiwalappa	17,333	46.77%	New
Margin of victory		2,396	6.46%	▼37.88
Turnout		38,443	54.29%	▲4.47
Total valid votes		37,062		
Registered electors		70,815		▲21.07
INC hold		Swing	▼18.94	

=== Assembly Election 1967 ===
1967 Mysore State Legislative Assembly election : Afzalpur
Party	Candidate	Votes	%	±%
INC	N. S. Patil	19,761	72.17%	▼14.35
Independent	G. A. R. Basappa	7,620	27.83%	New
Margin of victory		12,141	44.34%	▼33.51
Turnout		29,139	49.82%	▲14.55
Total valid votes		27,381		
Registered electors		58,492		▲18.11
INC hold		Swing	▼14.35	

=== Assembly Election 1962 ===
1962 Mysore State Legislative Assembly election : Afzalpur
Party	Candidate	Votes	%	±%
INC	Anna Rao Basappa Ganamukhi	14,078	86.52%	New
RPI	Sharnappa Rukkappa	1,411	8.67%	New
PSP	Neelkanth Laxman Rao Kulkarni	782	4.81%	New
Margin of victory		12,667	77.85%	
Turnout		17,465	35.27%	
Total valid votes		16,271		
Registered electors		49,525		
INC hold		Swing		

=== Assembly Election 1957 ===
1957 Mysore State Legislative Assembly election : Afzalpur
Party	Candidate	Votes	%	±%
INC	Anna Rao Basappa Ganamukhi	Unopposed		
Registered electors		47,696		▼7.19
INC hold		Swing		

=== Assembly Election 1952 ===
1952 Hyderabad State Legislative Assembly election : Afzalpur
Party	Candidate	Votes	%	±%
INC	Anna Rao Basappa Ganamukhi	8,604	77.34%	New
Independent	Bhairappa	1,928	17.33%	New
Socialist Party (India)	Jagannath Rao Bhim Rao	593	5.33%	New
Margin of victory		6,676	60.01%	
Turnout		11,125	21.65%	
Total valid votes		11,125		
Registered electors		51,390		
INC win (new seat)				

== See also ==
- List of constituencies of the Karnataka Legislative Assembly
- Kalaburagi district
