= Gobbur (B) =

Gobbur (B) Gopura Gopura
- village
- Interactive map of Gobbur (B)
- Country: India
- State: Karnataka
- District: Gulbarga
- Talukas: Afzalpur

Population (2001)
  - Total: 8,000

Languages
  - Official: Kannada
- Time zone: UTC+5:30 (IST)

Gobbur (B) is a village in the southern state of Karnataka, India. It is located in the Afzalpur taluk of Kalaburagi district.

== Demographics ==
As of 2011 India census, Gobbur (B) had a population of 7950 with 3895 males and 4055 females.

== See also ==
- Gulbarga
- Districts of Karnataka
