= Ingalgi =

- village
- Location in Karnataka, India Ingalgi (India)
- Coordinates: 15°07′N 75°14′E
- Country: India
- State: Karnataka
- District: Gulbarga
- Talukas: Chitapur

Population (2001)
  - Total: 5,122

Languages
  - Official: Kannada
- Time zone: UTC+5:30 (IST)

Ingalgi is a village in the southern state of Karnataka, India. It is located in the Chitapur taluk of Kalaburagi district in Karnataka.

== Demographics ==
As of 2001 India census, Ingalgi had a population of 5122 with 2584 males and 2538 females.

== See also ==
- Gulbarga
- Districts of Karnataka
