= Nalwar =

- village
- Location in Karnataka, India Nalwar (India)
- Coordinates: 16°56′37″N 76°59′31″E
- Country: India
- State: Karnataka
- District: Kalaburagi
- Talukas: Chittapur

Population (2001)
  - Total: 11,533

Languages
  - Official: Kannada
- Time zone: UTC+5:30 (IST)

Nalwar is a village in the southern state of Karnataka, India. It is in the Chitapur taluk of Kalaburagi district.

== Demographics ==
As of 2001 India census, Nalwar had a population of 11,533 with 5910 males and 5623 females.

== See also ==
- Districts of Karnataka
- Gulbarga
