= Chittapur railway station =

Railway station in Karnataka, India

General information
- Location: Railway Station Rd, Chitapur, Kalaburagi District, Karnataka. India
- Coordinates: 17°07′11″N 77°05′26″E
- Elevation: 633 m (2,077 ft)
- System: Indian Railways station
- Line: Begumpet–Wadi
- Platforms: 2
- Tracks: 4 5 ft 6 in (1,676 mm) broad gauge

Construction
- Structure type: Standard (on-ground station)
- Parking: Available

Other information
- Status: Functioning
- Station code: CT
- Zone(s): South Central Railway,
- Division(s): Secunderabad
Location
- Location within India Location within Karnataka

Chittapur railway station, (station code:CT) is an Indian Railways train station located in Chitapur, Kalaburagi in the Indian state of Karnataka and serves Chitapur area. It is located on the Begumpet–Wadi line of Secunderabad railway division in South Central Railway zone.

== History ==
The Wadi–Secunderabad line was built in 1874 with financing by the Nizam of Hyderabad. It later became part of Nizam's Guaranteed State Railway

== Structure and expansion ==
Chittapur railway station has two platforms and four tracks each running to 650 meters in length, computerized reservation counter, waiting room, light refreshment stall and tea stall, parking, foot overbridge, waiting room, and toilet facilities. Chittapur has connectivity with Bengaluru, Pune, Hyderabad, Sainagar Shirdi, Latur, Aurangabad and Mumbai.

Preceding station	Indian Railways	Following station
Malkhaid Road (MQR) towards ?	South Central Railway zone Begumpet–Wadi	Sulehalli (SUH) towards ?
