= Buddhism in North Karnataka =

Buddhism in Northern Karnataka has seen major development after the discovery of an Ashoka inscription at Maski in Raichur District a few decades ago and of a Buddhist settlement through a series of archaeological excavations at Sannati which have shed light on the historic significance of Karnataka.

During 1954-95, 81 stone inscriptions, 2 stupas, 3 dibbas or mounds and a defence fort have been discovered at Sannati.

== History ==
Buddhism had in fact entered Karnataka before the time of the Emperor Ashoka, and that it enjoyed its heyday between the 3rd century B.C. and the 3rd century A.D.

=== Mauryas ===
Buddhism first emerged during Mauryas times when there was a missionary zeal. Parts of Karnataka were subject to the rule of the Mauryas. Chandragupta Maurya's son Bindusara (298-273 BC) and Bindusara's son Ashoka (269-232 BC) caused some of his edicts to be put up here. Ashoka's grandson Samprati Chandragupta is believed to have come to Shravanabelagola where he spent his last years.

Eleven Ashokas edicts: 4 in Bellary District, 3 in Raichur District and 3 others in Chitradurga District bear witness to the Mauryas presence in Karnataka.

=== Satavahana ===
The Satavahana may have been a Karnataka dynasty, as Dharwad and Bellary Districts are called Shantavahani Hara (or Shantavahana region). Some of their kings were called rulers of Kunthala, the old name for Karnataka.

The Satavahana were successors to the Mauryas and ruled in Banavasi, as is evident from the Nasik inscription of Gautamiputra Satakarni and the copper plates from Hirehadagali.

At Sannati in Gulbarga District, as well as Vadgoan Madhavpur near Belgaum and Brahmagiri in Chitradurga District, there are remains of monuments of their period. The Uttara Kannada area of Banavasi has their inscription at Vasan in Dharwad District, and there are remains of a brick temple.

=== Kadamba ===
Kadambas capital was also Banavasi, known as Vaijayanti. They were tolerant towards Buddhism as epigraphic evidence shows. Recent excavations of the site of Banavasi have given the remains of a Buddhist stupa. The large apsidal structure is what remains and it was planned like a dharma chakra. Kadambas century was a prominent one for Buddhism in Karnataka.

Chinese traveller, Hieun Tsang, visited Banavasi in the 7th century AD and saw 1000 sangharamas and three stupas. He said "By the side of the royal palace was a great sangharama with 300 priests, all men of distinction. This convent has a great vihara 100 in height".

== Buddhist temple in North Karnataka ==
- Aihole

Aihole, is today an insignificant village in Bagalkot District of North Karnataka. This place was a workshop for temple architects and sculptors patronized by early Chalukyas monarchs. Here are some of the earliest structural temples in stone in the country, dating from 450 AD, including one of the 4 Buddhist shrines in Karnataka. Aihole's hillock, Meguti, to the rock cut Buddhist shrine. It is the most important surviving Buddhist temple in Karnataka.

The Buddhist Chaitya at Aihole, is pre western Chalukyas and indicates the influence of Mahayana. It was built around the 5th century and is 25 feet high.

- Sannati

Sannati, Chitapur Taluk, Gulbarga District, on both banks of the river Bhima, that many Buddhist stupas of the Shatvahana times have been found. Sannati, which date back to the 1st to 3rd century AD, the oldest among the Karnataka Buddhist sites and monuments.

Sannati which resembles Amravati and was the Buddhist centre of the Shatvahana period of pre Christian era and stands as a significant cluster of dozens of Buddhist relics, which include 2 stupas, 3 mounds, 1 fortification, 4 major rock edicts and more than 75 contemporary inscriptions. All scattered across a compact area of about 10 square kilometres.

Sculptures can be seen all along and the Buddhist ruins found there are in large numbers. They include remnants of stupas, stone pottery for holy bones and ayaka stambha which has symbolic representation of birth, parinishnishkramana, enlightenment, preaching and nirvana (salvation) of Buddha.

=== Inscriptions ===
Inscriptions in the Brahmi script contain names of those who gave grants to sangharama, stupas and viharas.

- Badami

Badami, the erstwhile capital city of the western Chalukyas in the 6th century. These rulers were also associated with Buddhism and relics here have survived in the shape of a Buddhist cave. There is also a figure, identifiable as Padmapani, the Bodhisattva of the same period.

The Chinese traveller Xuanzang (Hieun Tsang) has stated that during the time of Pulakeshin II in 642 AD in Banavasi or Konkanpura, there were 400 Sangharamas and 10000 followers of Buddhism.

- Dambal (in Gadag District, there was a Buddhist centre as during 12th century)

=== Inscription ===
A Dambala inscription of 1095 AD, begins with the customary invocation namo buddhyana and goes go to describe at length the greatness of Tara bhagavati.

Inscription of 1095 AD, a temple of the Buddhist deity Tara and a Buddhist vihara were built by 16 merchants during the reign of Lakshmidevi, queen of Vikramaditya VI. Another temple of Tara, built at Dambal was by Sethi Sangarmaya of Lokkigundi (Lakkundi).

- Kolivada

Kolivada, Hubbali taluk, Dharwad District.

An icon of Tara has been discovered belonging to about the 13th century.

=== Inscription ===
Inscribed on the pedestal of this icon are the words "siddham om namo bhagavatayai Aryatarayai", and followed by the usual statement of the Buddha's teaching in brief.

== Buddhist Tibetan settlement at Mundgod ==
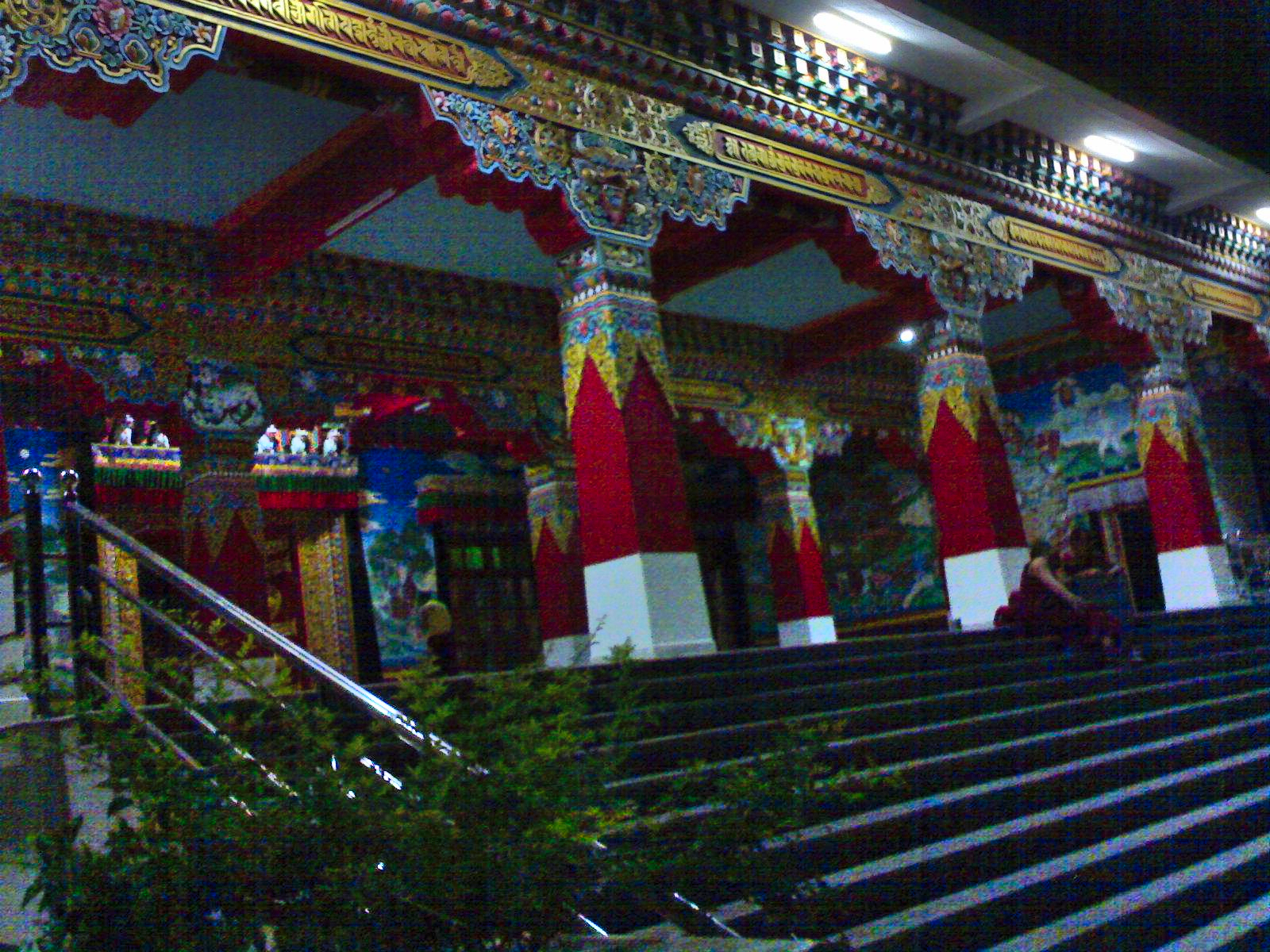
Tibetan colony Mundgod

The Tibetan settlement at Mundgod, is located 45 km from Hubli-Dharwad and the settlement at Mundgod is the largest in India. It was founded in 1966. Now there are nine camps with two monasteries and a nunnery. One of the monasteries is Rato Dratsang.
