= Akhandhalli =

Coordinates: 16°51′N 76°31′E

- village
- Akhandhalli is in Gulbarga district
- Interactive map of Akhandhalli
- Country: India
- State: Karnataka
- District: Gulbarga
- Talukas: Jevargi

Government
  - Body: Village Panchayat

Languages
  - Official: Hindi, Kannada
- Time zone: UTC+5:30 (IST)
- Nearest city: Gulbarga
- Civic agency: Village Panchayat

Akhandhalli is a village in the southern state of Karnataka, India, located in the Jevargi taluk of Kalaburagi district.

== See also ==
- Gulbarga
- Districts of Karnataka
