= M. Y. Patil =

Indian politician

Moreshwar Yashwantrao Patil

Member of Karnataka Legislative Assembly
- Incumbent
- Assumed office 2018
- Preceded by: Malikayya Venkayya Guttedar
- Constituency: Afzalpur
- In office 2004–2007
- Preceded by: Malikayya Guttedar
- Succeeded by: Malikayya Guttedar
- In office 1978–1983
- Preceded by: Digambar Rao Balwantrao
- Succeeded by: Hanamanth Rao Desai

Personal details
- Born: 5 April 1941 (age 85) Desai Kallur, Kalaburagi district, Kingdom of Mysuru, British India (present-day Karnataka, India)
- Party: Indian National Congress (1983-2004; 2014-present)
- Other political affiliations: Janata Party (1978-1983); Janata Dal (Secular) (2004-2008); Bharatiya Janata Party (2008-2012); Karnataka Janata Paksha (2012-2014)
- As of January 20, 2025

Moreshwar Yashwantrao Patil, also known as M. Y. Patil, is an Indian National Congress politician from Karnataka. He is a four-time member of the Legislative Assembly, representing Afzalpur in the Karnataka Legislative Assembly. He has been a member of the Janata Party, Janata Dal (Secular), Bharatiya Janata Party and Karnataka Janata Paksha.

In the 2004 elections, he was elected as a JDS candidate from Afzalpur. He won with the support of Congress leaders such as Mallikarjun Kharge, Priyank Kharge and Basavaraj Bhimalli.

== Elections contested ==
- 1978 - Won from Afzalpur (JP)
- 1983 - Lost from Afzalpur (INC)
- 1994 - Lost from Afzalpur (INC)
- 1999 - Lost from Afzalpur (INC)
- 2004 - Won from Afzalpur (JDS)
- 2008 - Lost from Afzalpur (BJP)
- 2013 - Lost from Afzalpur (KJP)
- 2018 - Won from Afzalpur (INC)
- 2023 - Won from Afzalpur (INC)
