= Kalaburagi–Hyderabad Intercity Express =

Train in India

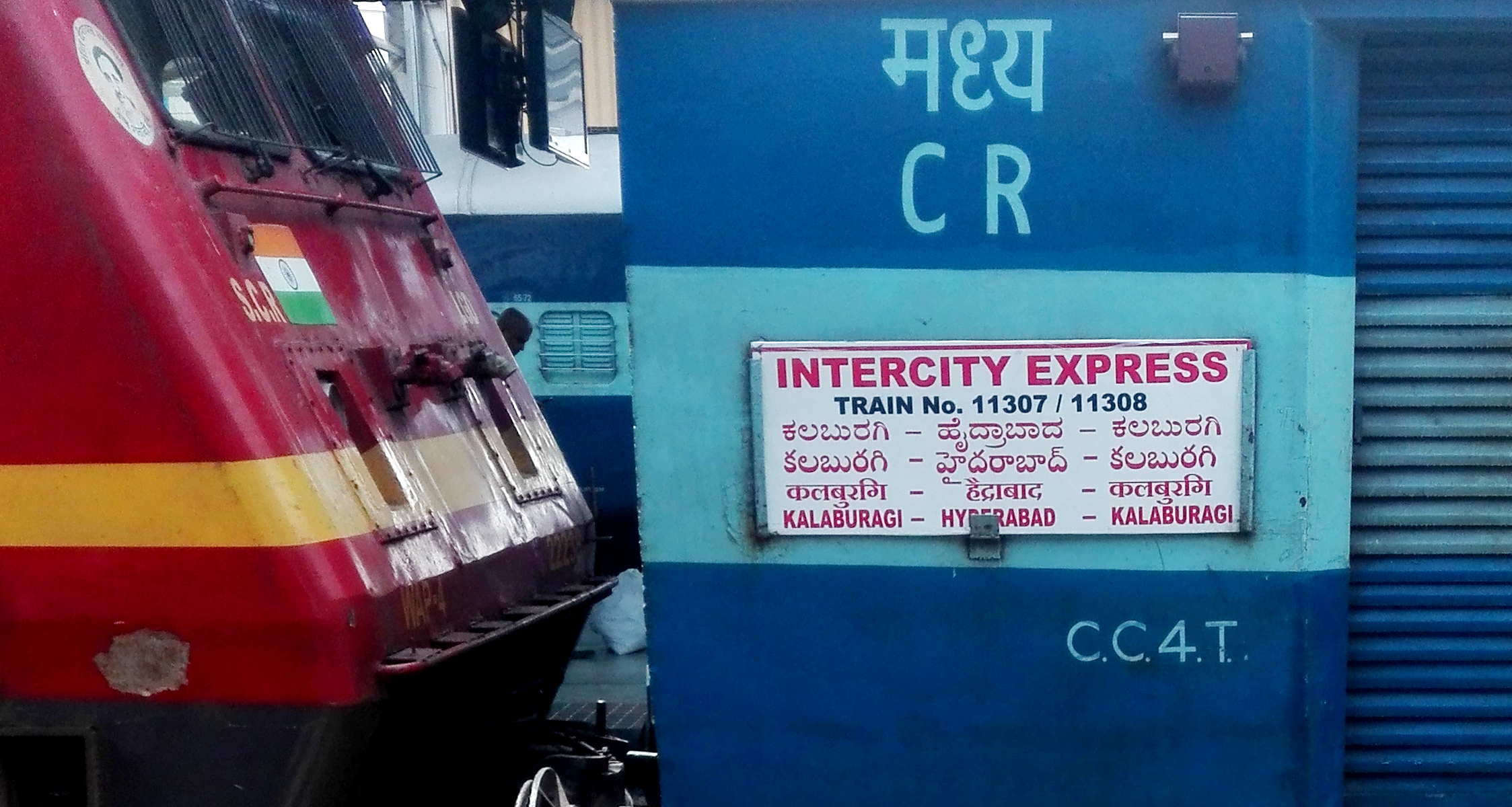

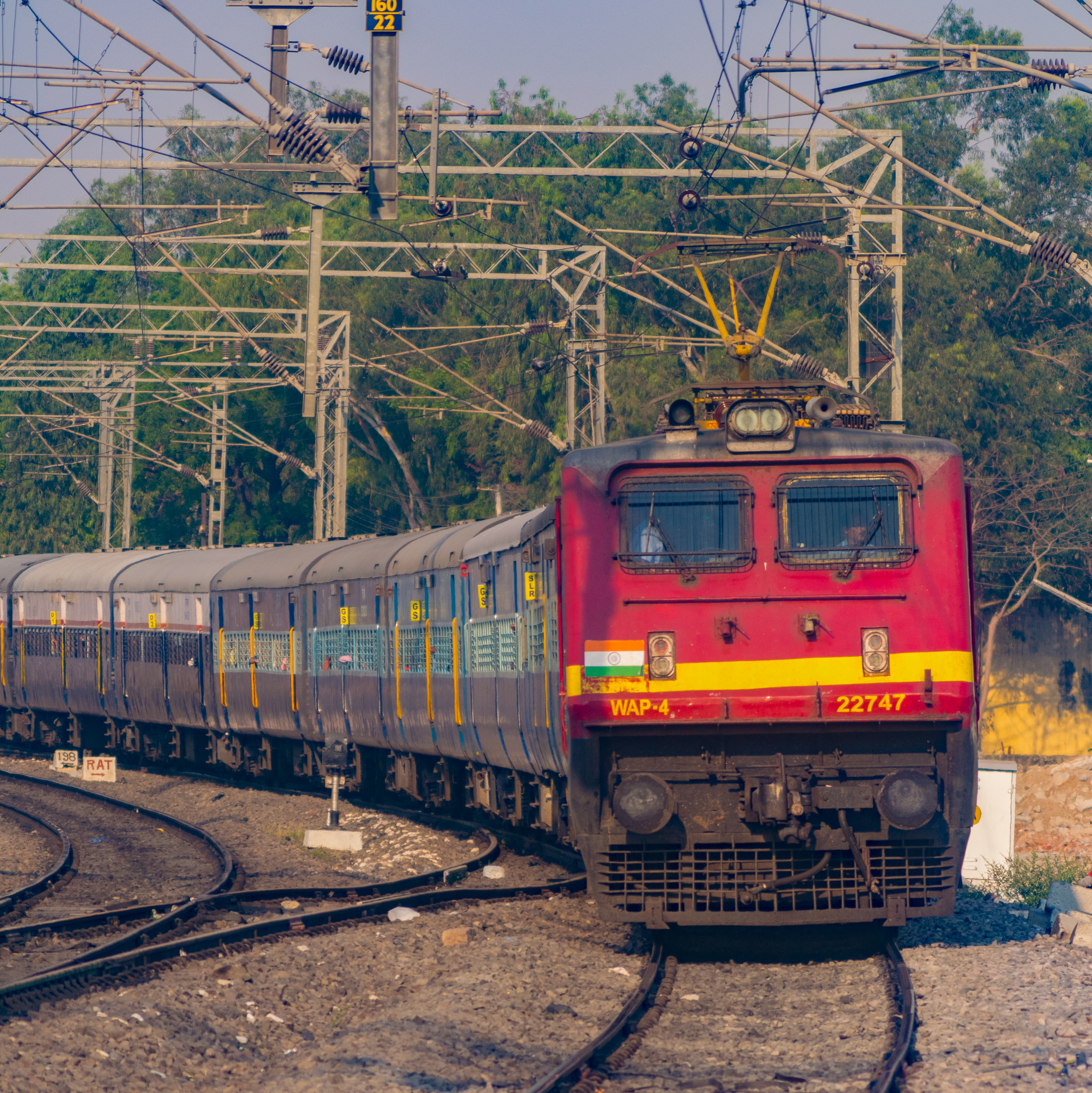
- 11308 Kalaburagi Express with WAP4 near Lingampally

Overview
- Service type: Express
- First service: 8 August 2016; 9 years ago
- Current operator: Central Railway zone

Route
- Termini: Kalaburagi (KLBG); Hyderabad Deccan (HYB)
- Stops: 5
- Distance travelled: 222 km (138 mi)
- Average journey time: 4 hours 35 minutes
- Service frequency: Daily (Note: Runs seven days in a week for every direction.)
- Train number: 11307/11308

On-board services
- Classes: AC 3 tier Chair Car, Chair Car, General Unreserved
- Seating arrangements: Yes
- Sleeping arrangements: Yes
- Catering facilities: No
- Entertainment facilities: No
- Baggage facilities: Below the seats

Technical
- Rolling stock: 2
- Track gauge: 1,676 mm (5 ft 6 in)
- Operating speed: 58 km/h (36 mph)
Route map
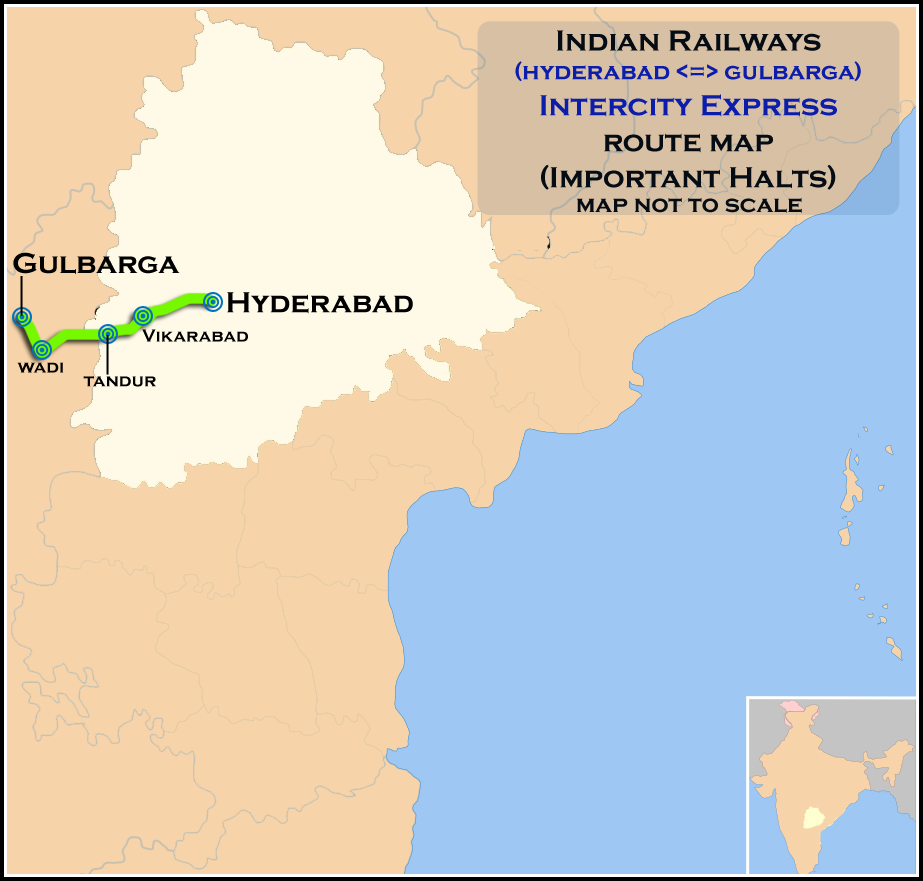

Kalaburagi–Hyderabad Intercity Express is an intercity train of the Indian Railways connecting Kalaburagi in Karnataka and Hyderabad Deccan of Telangana. It is operated with 11307/11308 train numbers on a daily basis.

== Service ==
The 11307/Kalaburagi–Hyderabad InterCity Express has an average speed of 48 km/h and covers 222 km in 4 hrs 35 mins. 11308/Hyderabad–KalaburagiIntercity Express has an average speed of 44 km/h and 222 km in 5 hrs.

== Route and halts ==
The important halts of the train are:

- Kalaburagi
- Shahabad
- Wadi Junction
- Tandur
- Vikarabad Junction
- Lingampalli
- Hyderabad Deccan

== Coach composition ==
The train has standard ICF rakes with max speed of 110 kmph. The train consists of 13 coaches:

- 1 AC III Tier Chair Car
- 4 Chair Car
- 6 General
- 2 Second-class Luggage/parcel van

== Traction ==
Both trains are hauled by electric locomotive either WAP-7 or WAP-4 from Kalaburagi to Hyderabad and vice versa.
