= Wadgera, Kalaburagi =

- village
- Location in Karnataka, India
- Coordinates: 16°46′5″N 76°32′54″E
- Country: India
- State: Karnataka
- District: Kalaburagi
- Taluka: Jevargi

Population (2001)
  - Total: 3,197

Languages
  - Official: Kannada
- Time zone: UTC+5:30 (IST)

Wadgera is a panchayat village in the southern state of Karnataka, India. Administratively, Wadgera is under the Jevargi Taluka, Kalaburagi district, Karnataka. Wadgera is 5 km by road north of the village of Hadnoor and 64 km by road southwest of the taluka headquarters village of Jevargi.

There are four villages in the Wadgera, Kalaburagi gram panchayat: Wadgera, Dumadri, Hangerga (K), and Sumbad.

== Demographics ==
As of 2001 India census, Wadgera had a population of 3,197 with 1,603 males and 1,594 females.

== See also ==
- Kalaburagi district
- Districts of Karnataka
