= Dandothi =

- village
- Location in Karnataka, India Dandothi (India)
- Coordinates: 17.183350°N 77.1091000°E
- Country: India
- State: Karnataka
- District: Kalaburagi
- Talukas: Chitapur

Population (2001)
  - Total: 5,991

Languages
  - Official: Kannada
- Time zone: UTC+5:30 (IST)
- Postal code: 585211

Dandothi is a village in the southern state of Karnataka, India. It is located in the Chitapur taluk of Kalaburagi district in Karnataka.

== Demographics ==
As of 2001 India census, Dandothi had a population of 5991 with 3023 males and 2968 females.

== See also ==
- Districts of Karnataka
