= Bhognalli =

- village
- Location in Karnataka, India Bhognalli (India)
- Coordinates: 17°15′54″N 76°29′45″E
- Country: India
- State: Karnataka
- District: Kalaburagi

Population (2001)
  - Total: 1,308

Languages
  - Official: Kannada
- Time zone: UTC+5:30 (IST)

Bhognalli is a village situated in the Deccan Plateau of India. It is 2 km off the state highway SH22 in the Kalaburagi district of Karnataka, it is connected by road to the neighbouring villages of Shinur and Ankalga. Afzalpur is 14 km by road and Solapur is around 100 km away. The population is 1,308.

== Facilities ==
The village has a Kannada language government school which teaches up to 7th class. The villagers are mostly farmers. Many from the younger generations have migrated to cities such as Mumbai and a few have flown to Persian Gulf countries in search of a better living. The village comes under Afzalpur legislative assembly and Gulbarga Lok Sabha constituency. The current MLA (2009) is from the Congress Party.

There are no basic medical facilities available in the village. The nearest government hospital is in Atnur, 5 km by road. For major medical needs villagers travel to Gulbarga or Solapur. There are few graduates in this village.

== Sources ==
- Google Maps
