= Udchan =

Udachan
- village
- Country: India
- State: Karnataka
- District: Gulbarga
- Talukas: Afzalpur

Population (2001)
  - Total: 5,933

Languages
  - Official: Kannada
- Time zone: UTC+5:30 (IST)
- Postal code: 585217

Udachan is a village in the southern state of Karnataka, India. It is located in the Afzalpur taluk of Kalaburagi district.

== Demographics ==
As of 2001 India census, Udachan had a population of 5933 with 3069 males and 2864 females.

== See also ==
- Gulbarga
- Districts of Karnataka
