= Hongunta =

- village
- Country: India
- State: Karnataka
- District: Gulbarga
- Talukas: Shahabad

Population (2001)
  - Total: 5,141

Languages
  - Official: Kannada
- Time zone: UTC+5:30 (IST)

Hongunta is a village in the southern state of Karnataka, India. It is located in the Shahabad taluk of Kalaburagi district in Karnataka.

== Demographics ==
As of 2001 India census, Hongunta had a population of 5141 with 2617 males and 2524 females.

== See also ==
- Gulbarga
- Districts of Karnataka
