= Wadi, Karnataka =

Town in Karnataka, India

Wadi
- Town
- Location in Karnataka, India
- Coordinates: 17.07°N 76.98°E
- Country: India
- State: Karnataka
- District: Kalaburagi
- Taluka: Chittapur
- Elevation: 411 m (1,348 ft)

Population (2011)
  - Total: 25,258

Languages
  - Official: Kannada
- Time zone: UTC+5:30 (IST)
- PIN: 585225
- Vehicle registration: KA-32

Wadi is a census town in Kalaburagi district in the Indian state of Karnataka.The Wadi Town Has a 23 Municipal Ward. The Wadi Junction railway station is an important railway junction on the Indian railways. Gulbarga, which is around 37 km via rail route and 40 km via roadway from Wadi The railway line from Secunderabad to Wadi was started in 1874.

== Geography ==
Wadi is located at 17.07°N 76.98°E. It has an average elevation of 411 metres (1348 feet).

== Demographics ==
As of 2011 India census, Wadi had a population of 37,988. Males constitute 51% of the population and females 49%. Wadi has an average literacy rate of 54%, lower than the national average of 59.5%: male literacy is 63% and female literacy is 45%. In Wadi, 14% of the population is under 6 years of age.

== Tourism ==
Wadi is a tourist spot. Some of the attractions are the two Hanuman Temples, one in railway colony and the other situated at Konchur, a village 10 km from Wadi railway station. Also of interest are the Astaan E Quadri Halkatta Sharif Dargah, also 6 km from Wadi town, and the ACC cement plants, which use both the latest and obsolete technologies.

== Transport ==
Wadi Junction railway station is on the Solapur-Guntakal line, which is part of Mumbai-Chennai line. Trains from the metro cities of Mumbai, Bengaluru, Hyderabad and Chennai pass through the city. It is also connected to Secunderabad by rail.

== Income/Economy ==
Wadi is home to two cement plants of ACC, one of 2.6 mtpa (million tonnes per annum) capacity and the other 2.1 mtpa. These are some of the largest cement plants in the country. Wadi is also famous for limestone mines. Wadi is also an important railway junction.

The cement plants of ACC, the railways and the limestone have attracted people from diverse regions and cultures, in search of employment.

== Educational Institutes ==
Wadi has a no. of educational institutions:

- Chakravarthy Kanavashila Vidya Varthaka Samsthe.
- Dr.B R Ambedkar School
- St. Ambrose Convent School
- D.A.V Public School
- Al Ameen Urdu School
- Government Industrial Training Institute [ITI]
- National M. A. V. Primary School
- Mahatma Gandhi School
- Mini Rose
- V. P. Naik College
- Bahamani Kingdom Women's College
- Govt. High School
- Shri Shail Mallikaarjun Vidyaa Vardhak Sounsthey
- Balvikas Mandir Higher Primary School
- Mathoshri Kusumabai Devappa Dahihande Kannada Medium High School
- Mathoshri Ramabai Ambedkar Kanya Proudha Shaley

== Business ==
Wadi Market is old. Thursdays are marked as the weekly market (or weekly shandy or vaara santhe) days, where people from nearby towns and villages visit for selling and buying daily essentials like vegetables, fruits, etc.

It's mainly held on road side near the railway ticket counter every Thursday from 9 am to around 6 pm, depending on availability of stock to be purchased.

Important landmarks are GOPALRAO INFO SOLUTIONS and KHANDELWAL RAJORE BUILDING, SARDARJI BUILDING, IRANI BUILDING ARE the oldest building in Wadi. It is close to Wadi Railway Junction.And there is a renowned shopping store "Begum's super bazar" located near vegetable market.
