= Farhatabad =

- village
- Location in Karnataka, India Farhatabad (India)
- Coordinates: 17°11′7″N 76°47′42″E
- Country: India
- State: Karnataka
- District: Kalaburagi district
- Talukas: Gulbarga

Population (2001)
  - Total: 5,211

Languages
  - Official: Kannada
- Time zone: UTC+5:30 (IST)

Farhatabad is a village in the southern state of Karnataka, India. It is located in the Gulbarga taluk of Kalaburagi district.

== Demographics ==
As of 2001 India census, Farhatabad had a population of 5211 with 2616 males and 2595 females.

== See also ==
- Gulbarga
- Districts of Karnataka
