= Motakpalli =

Motakpalli is a village in Kalaburagi district, Karnataka, India. It is one of the pilgrimage place of Lord Hanuman.
