= Madan Hipperga =

Madan Hipparaga
- Village
- Location within Karnataka Location within India
- Coordinates: 17°27′35″N 76°22′25″E
- Country: India
- State: Karnataka
- District: Kalaburgi
- Talukas: Aland

Population (2001)
  - Total: 7,665

Languages
  - Official: Kannada
- Time zone: UTC+5:30 (IST)

Madan Hipperga is a village in the southern state of Karnataka, India. It is located in the Aland taluk of Kalaburagi district in Karnataka.

== Demographics ==
As of 2001 India census, Madan Hipparaga had a population of 7,665 with 3,900 males and 3,765 females. It is 75 km from its district Kalaburgi and 28 km from its taluk Aland. It is the biggest village in its taluk.

== See also ==
- Gulbarga
- Districts of Karnataka
