= Kanaganahalli =

Sannati Sannati
- Village
- Location in Karnataka, India Sannati (Karnataka)
- Coordinates: 16.835433°N 76.932541°E
- Country: India
- State: Karnataka
- District: Kalaburagi

Area
  - Total: 1.5 km^{2} (0.58 sq mi)

Languages
  - Official: Kannada
- Time zone: UTC+5:30 (IST)
- PIN: 585218
- Telephone code: 08474
- Nearest city: Chitapur

Kanaganahalli, situated about 3 km from Sannati, is an important Buddhist site where an ancient stupa was built. It is on the left bank of the Bhima river in Chitapur taluk, Kalaburagi district in Karnataka, India. Nalwar is the nearest Railway station about 19 km from Sannati. The Buddhist site is about 2.5 km from Chandrala Parameshwari temple of Sannati.

== History ==
The excavation remains at Kanaganahalli can be dated to between the 1st century BC to the 3rd century AD.

In circa the 1st century BC, the stupa at Kanganahalli was constructed as per the inscriptions referred to as Hama Chaitya, and it was patronized by the Mahayana division of Buddhism during the 3rd and 4th centuries AD. During the Satavahana period, the Amaravati School of art made a deep impact on the sculptural and architectural forms of the Kanaganahalli region. This was indeed a period of great artistic efflorescence that gave the maha chaitya an impressive form "unsurpassed" in the history of stupa architecture in the south India.

The sculptured panels of the medhi (circular terrace), two dimensional sculptures and typical animal motifs are of an indigenous nature. They exhibit a transition phase between the early Amaravati sculptural art and the later, more elaborately sculptured panels of Nagarjunakonda.

The artistry of Kanaganahalli reveals notable differences from its Amaravati counterparts. At Kanaganahalli we can see carvings that reflect the geometric patterns, floral motifs, dress and ornamentation, and a stacked composition of the subject matter in the large sculptured panels that creates a flat illusion of depth.

A relief depicting the Mauryan emperor Ashoka is found at Kanaganahalli, identified through an inscription found during excavations of 1994-1998 (see below). Depictions of Shatavahana kings Simuka and Vasishthiputra Pulumavi are also represented.

At Kanaganahalli, the anda or dome portion of the stupa is partially in view, although the majority of the architectural members and sculptural panels are not in their original position.

== ASI Excavation Site ==
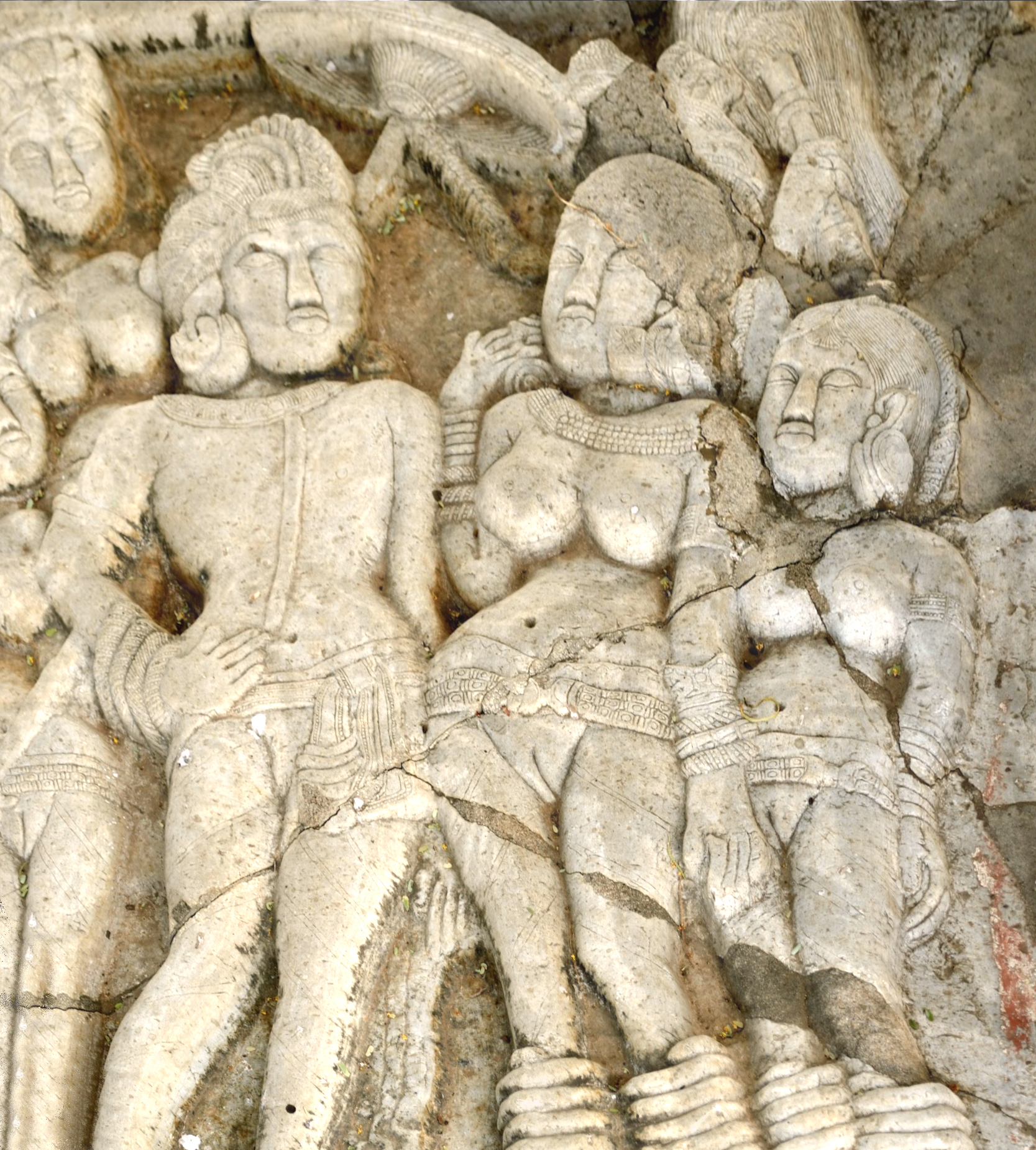
Ashoka with his Queen, at Sannati (Kanaganahalli Stupa), 1st-3rd century CE.

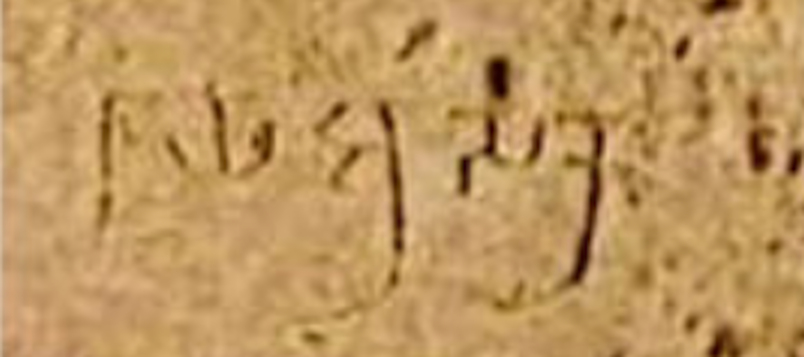
The words "Rāya Asoko" (𑀭𑀸𑀬 𑀅𑀲𑁄𑀓𑁄) in Brahmi script inscribed on the relief identify king Ashoka as the subject matter.

Kanaganahalli is an excavation site managed by the Archaeological Survey of India.

=== Excavation during 1994 to 1998 ===
- During these Kanaganahalli excavations, the remains of a massive stupa, many brick Chaitya-griha structures and other memorial stupas were brought to light.
- Architectural fragments of the stupa were found, including carved veneer slabs, railings, pillars, capitals, stone padas (footprints of the Buddha), four images of the Buddha, and sculpted yakshas (protective nature spirits).
- The sculptured panels depicts various Jataka tales of Lord Buddha and the depictionss of several Shatavahana kings.

=== Inscriptions ===
In addition to one long inscription, 145 short inscriptions were discovered, dating from between the 1st century BCE to 1st century CE ("common era"). One of the most important discoveries was the relief-depiction of Maurya emperor Ashoka, identified by a brahmi inscription "Rāya Asoko", meaning "King Ashoka."

=== Excavation during 2000 to 2002 ===
- During the excavations, the bare and ruined remnants of a number of brick structures connected by paved and sheltered passages were found. This includes part of a possible monastic complex to the north-west of the main stupa.
- Lead coins bearing the names of Shatavahana kings like Satakarni, Pulumavi and Yajnasri were discovered.
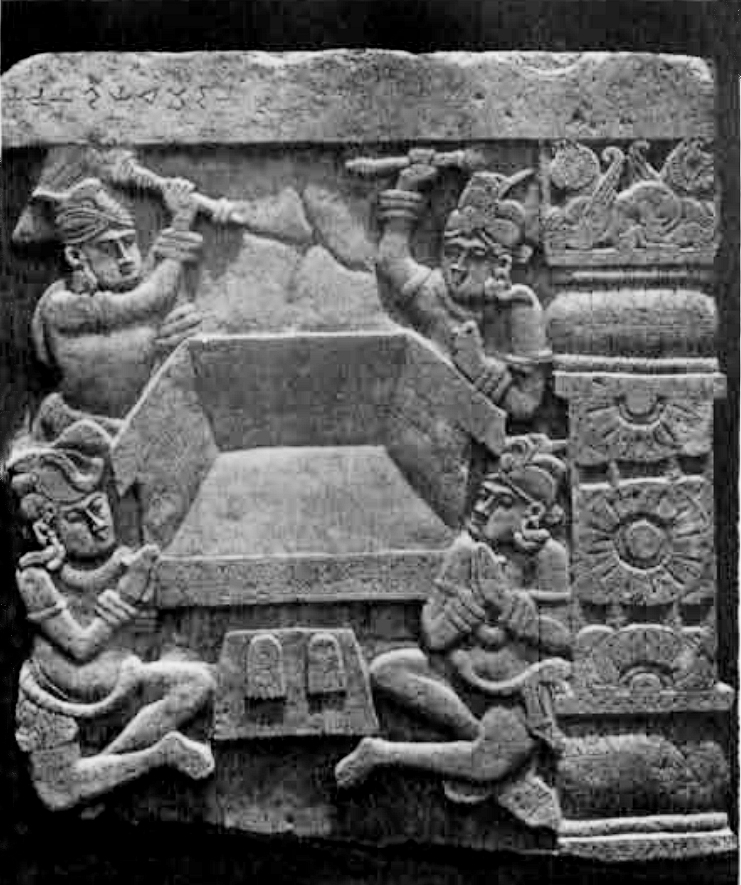
Kanaganahalli aniconic relief of the empty throne of the Buddha

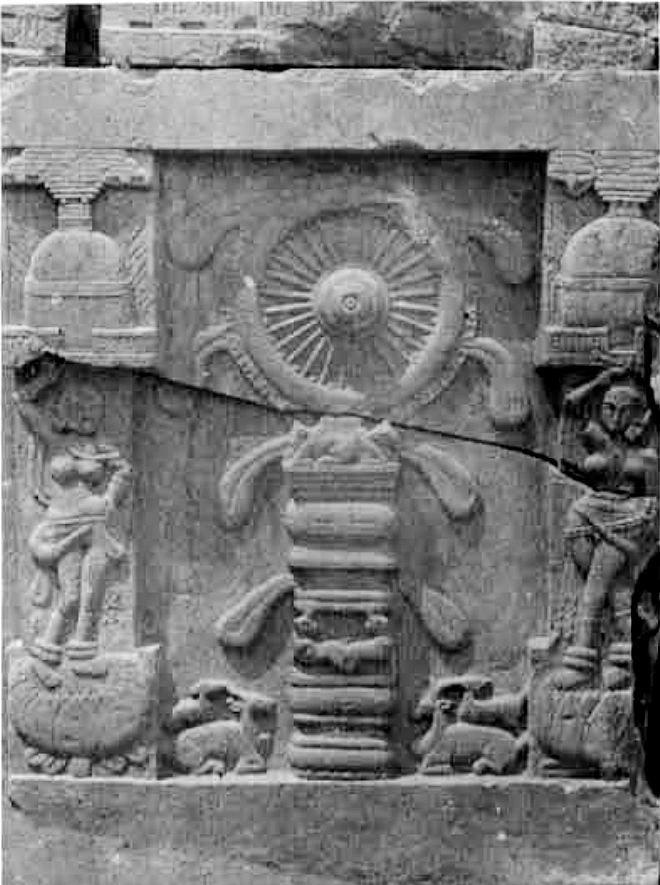
Kanaganahalli dharmachakra relief

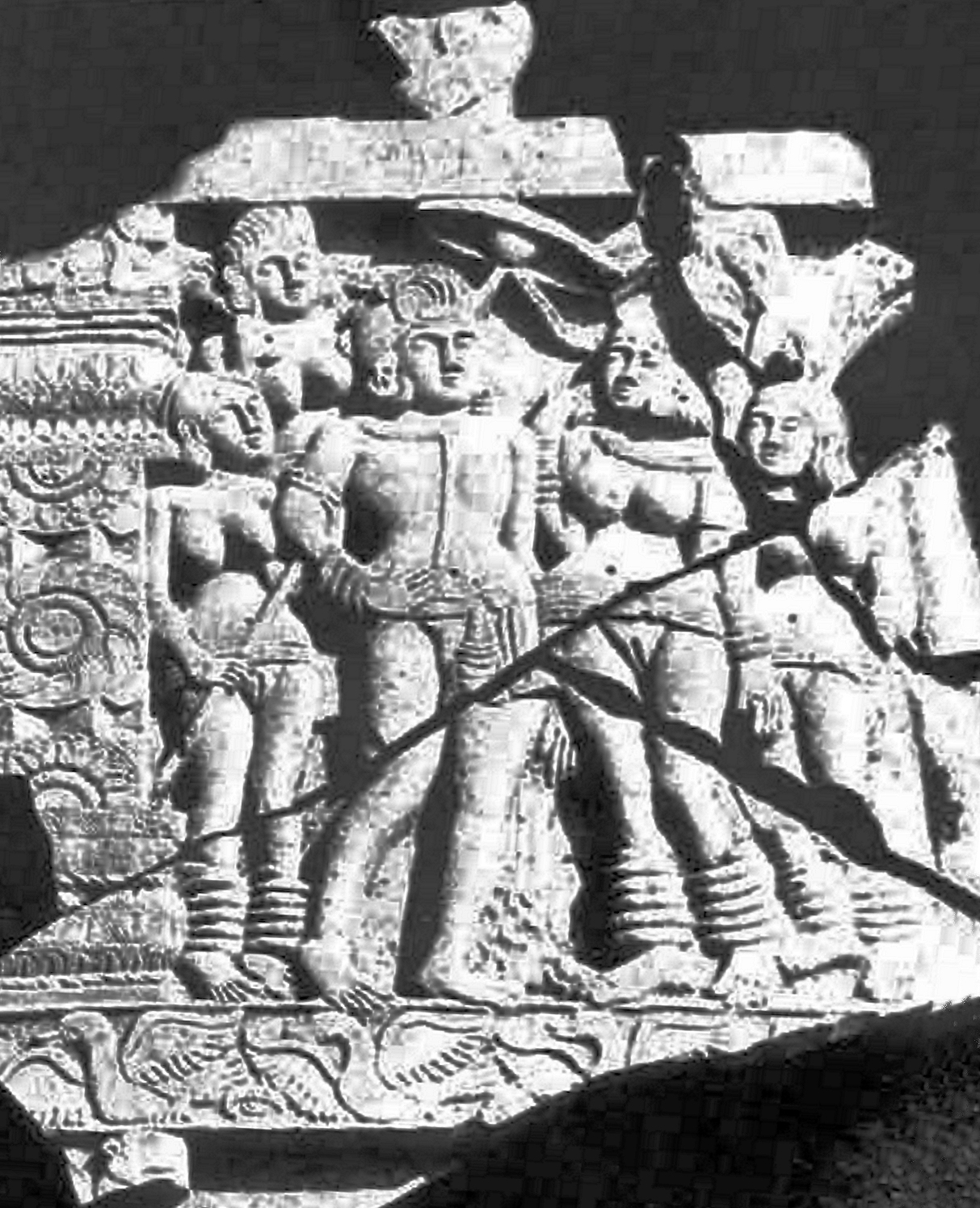
Kanaganahalli inscribed panel depicting Asoka

Conservation restarted in 2022.

=== Satavahana inscriptions ===
The oldest Satavahana inscription is the one found on a slab of the upper drum (medhi) of the Kanaganahalli stupa mentioning "year 16" of Vasisthiputra Sri Chimuka Satavahana's reign, which can be dated from ca. 110 BCE.

𑀭𑀸𑀚𑀸 𑀲𑀺𑀭𑀺 𑀙𑀺𑀫𑀼𑀓 𑀲𑀸𑀢𑀯𑀸𑀳𑀦𑀲 𑀲𑁄𑀟𑁂 𑀯𑀙𑀭𑁂 𑁛𑁗 𑀫𑀸𑀢𑀺𑀲𑁂𑀓

Rano siri chimu(ka) sātavāhanasa soḍe 10 6 mātiseka

"In the year sixteen 16 of King Siri Chimuka Slilaviihana"

— Kanaganahalli inscription of the 16th year of Simuka.

On another stone slab at Kanaganahalli, the king is possibly shown together with a Nagaraja, and the inscription reads:

𑀭𑀸𑀚𑀸 𑀲𑀺𑀭𑀺 𑀙𑀺𑀫𑀼𑀓𑁄 𑀲𑀸𑀤𑀯𑀸𑀳𑀦𑁄 𑀦𑀸𑀕𑀭𑀸𑀬 𑀲𑀔𑀥𑀸𑀪𑁄
Rājā Siri Chimuko Sādavāhano nāgarāya Sakhadhābho
"Lord King Simuka the Satavahana, Nagaraja Sakhadhābho"

— Kanaganahalli inscription of Simuka.

== International Buddhist Centre ==
The Government of Karnataka and ASI are planning to develop Kanaganahalli and Sannati as an International Buddhist Centre.

Senior IAS official S.M. Jamdhar has been appointed as its special officer.

== See also ==
- Sannati
- Kanakagiri
- Mauryan Empire
