= Malikayya Guttedar =

Indian politician

Member of the Karnataka Legislative Assembly
- In office 2008–2018
- Preceded by: M. Y. Patil
- Succeeded by: M. Y. Patil
- In office 1985–2004
- Preceded by: Hanmanth Rao Desai
- Succeeded by: M. Y. Patil

Personal details
- Born: 13 May 1956 (age 70) Solapur
- Party: Indian National Congress
- Other political affiliations: Bharatiya Janata Party (2018 - 2024)

Malikayya V. Guttedar (born 13 May 1956) is an Indian member of the Karnataka Legislative Assembly, representing the town of Afzalpur in the district of Gulbarga. Former minister of the Government of Karnataka and senior leader from Kalaburagi district, he was a member of the Indian National Congress party, and later joined BJP in 2018 and resigned in 2024. He lost against M. Y. Patil in the 2018 Karnataka Legislative Elections.

Malikayya V. Guttedar was appointed as pro-tem Speaker of 14th Karnataka Assembly.

Malikayya Guttedar has been appointed as Karnataka Housing Board Chairman in 2016.
