= SDB =

SDB or sdb may refer to:

== Places ==
- Air Force Base Langebaanweg (IATA airport code SDB), Western Cape, South Africa
- Sandbach railway station (station code SDB), Sandbach, Cheshire, England, UK
- Shahabad railway station (station code SDB), Kalaburagi, Karnataka, India
- Sønderborg railway station (station code Sdb), Sønderborg, Southern Jutland, Denmark; see List of railway stations in Denmark

== People ==
- Sébastien de Brossard (1655–1739; musicology abbreviation: SdB), French composer and musician
- S. D. B., post-nominal letters for members of the Salesians of Don Bosco Roman catholic order

== Groups, companies, organizations ==
- Shoreline Aviation (ICAO airline code SDB), a U.S. charter airline
- SDB bank, a Sri Lankan bank
- SDB, a Russian aircraft manufacturer, who make the SDB Karat
- Salesians of Don Bosco, a Roman Catholic religious order
- School for the Deaf and Blind, Philippines; former name of the Philippine School for the Deaf
- Seventh Day Baptist, a Christian denomination
- Society for Developmental Biology
- Special Design Bureau (Russian: особое конструкторское бюро, romanized: osoboye konstruktorskoye byuro, lit. 'special design bureau'; Russian: ОКБ, romanized: OKB, lit. 'SDB'), a type of Soviet bureau, a form of sharashka (Russian: шара́шка) R&D lab
- Sukhoi Design Bureau, Soviet Union; an aircraft manufacturer
- Surat Diamond Bourse, Surat, Gujarat, India; a diamond trading centre
- Social Democratic League (SDB; Dutch: Sociaal Democratische Bond), a Dutch socialist political party
- State Security Administration (SDB; Serbo-Croatian: Služba državne bezbednosti), Yugoslav secret police
- Serbian State Security (SDB; Serbian: Srpska državna bezbednost), a WWII Serbian-collaborationist German-occupation bureau in charge of the Serbian State Guard (SDS; Serbian: Srpska državna straža)
- State Security Service (SDB; Serbian: Srpski državne bezbednosti), Serbian secret police
- Serbian State-Building Bloc (SDB; Serbian: Srpski državotvorni blok), a political coalition in Serbia

== Military ==
- GBU-39 Small Diameter Bomb, guided bomb
- GBU-53/B StormBreaker Small Diameter Bomb II (SDB II)
- Service Dress Blue (SDB), a uniform of the United States Navy
- Seaward Defence Boat
- 2 Special Service Battalion (2. SDB; Afrikaans: 2 Spesiale Diens Bataljon), South African Army
- Myasishchev M-4, the Russian: стратегический дальный бомбардировщик, romanized: Strategicheskiy Dahl'niy Bombardirovshchik, lit. 'strategic long-range bomber' (Russian: СДБ, romanized: SDB)

== Other uses ==
- Subdwarf B star (sdB), a type of astronomical star
- /dev/sdb, the second SCSI, SATA or USB disk
- Shabaki language (ISO 639 language code sdb)
- sleep-disorder breathing (SDB), a disorder related to sleepwalking
