= Karajagi, Kalaburagi =

Karajgi Karajagi
- Village
- Location in Karnataka, India Karajgi (India)
- Coordinates: 17°16′53″N 76°12′58″E
- Country: India
- State: Karnataka
- District: Kalaburagi
- Taluka: Afzalpur

Area
  - Total: 52.6983 km^{2} (20.3469 sq mi)
- Elevation: 455 m (1,493 ft)

Population (2001)
  - Total: 7,708
  - Density: 146.3/km^{2} (378.8/sq mi)

Languages
- Time zone: UTC+5:30 (IST)
- Postal code: 585217

Karajgi is a village in northern Karnataka, in central India. Administratively, it is in Afzalpur Taluka of Kalaburagi district in Karnataka.

== Demographics ==
As of 2001 India population census, the Karajagi village had a population of 7,708, of which 3,976 were males while 3,732 were females. Overall literacy rate in Karajagi village was 50.16% compared to 75.36% for Karnataka. The male literacy stood at 58.60% while female literacy rate was 41.16%.

In the 2011 census, the population was essentially unchanged at 7,706; however, the Karajagi village population of children with ages under six was 1,152 which made up 14.95% of the total population of village. Although in 2011 Karajagi village still had a lower literacy rate compared to Karnataka's 75.36%, the literacy rate of Karajgi villager had risen to 58.97%, with male literacy at 68.89%, while female literacy rate was 48.39%.
