= Kalgi =

Kalagi
- village
- Location in Karnataka, India Kalagi (India)
- Coordinates: 17°21′N 77°09′E
- Country: India
- State: Karnataka
- District: Kalaburagi

Population (2010)
  - Total: 10,365

Languages
  - Official: Kannada
- Time zone: UTC+5:30 (IST)
- PIN: 585312
- Telephone code: 08474
- Nearest city: Gulbarga
- Sex ratio: 980/1000 ♂/♀
- Literacy: 54%
- Lok Sabha constituency: Gulbarga
- Vidhan Sabha constituency: Chincholi

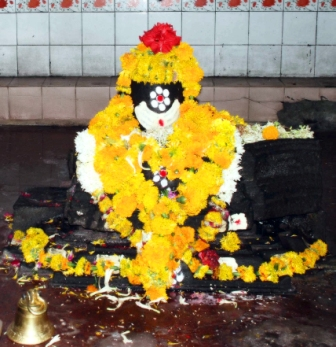

Kalagi is a new taluk in Kalaburagi, earlier it was a Hobli and Village in Chittapur Taluka in the southern state of Karnataka, India. It is located in the Chitapur taluk of Kalaburagi district in Karnataka.

== Transport ==
KSRTC bus facility available to travel within the Karnataka states.

The nearest railway station is (35 km) taluk :- Chittapur

Another nearby railway station is (40 km) dist : Kalaburagi

As of 2001 India census, Kalagi had a population of 7635 with 3853 males and 3782 females.

Kalgi is a village in Chitapur Taluk in Gulbarga District of Karnataka State, India. It belongs to Gulbarga Division . It is located 40 km towards East from District headquarters Gulbarga. 32 km from Chitapur. 572 km from State capital Bangalore

Kalgi Pin code is 585312 and postal head office is Kalgi .

Kodli (8 km), Halcher (11 km), Korwar (12 km), Ratkal (12 km), Tengli (13 km) are the nearby Villages to Kalgi. Kalgi is surrounded by Chitapur Taluk towards South, Chincholi Taluk towards East, Basheerabad Taluk towards East, Gulbarga Taluk towards west .

Sedam, Shahabad, Kalburgi, Gulbarga are the nearby Cities to Kalgi.

Demographics of Kalgi

Kannada is the Local Language here. Total population of Kalgi is 7635 .Males are 3853 and Females are 3,782 living in 1224 Houses. Total area of Kalgi is 4485 hectares. HOW TO REACH Kalgi

By Road

Chitapur is the Nearest Town to Kalgi. Chitapur is 35 km from Kalgi. Road connectivity is there from Chitapur to Kalgi.

== See also ==
- Gulbarga
- Districts of Karnataka
