= Taj Sultanpur =

Taj Sultanpur hala sultanpur
- village
- Country: India
- State: Karnataka
- District: Gulbarga
- Talukas: Gulbarga

Population (2001)
  - Total: 5,037

Languages
  - Official: Kannada
- Time zone: UTC+5:30 (IST)

Taj Sultanpur is a village in the southern state of Karnataka, India. It is located in the Gulbarga taluk of Kalaburagi district in Karnataka, Gulbarga also being the nearest town. It has a size of approximately 1,988.5 hectares (4,914 acres).

== Demographics ==
As of 2001 India census, Taj Sultanpur had a population of 7005 with 3500 males and 3505 females.

== See also ==
- Gulbarga
- Districts of Karnataka
