= Wadi ACC =

- Town
- Location in Karnataka, India
- Coordinates: 17.05°N 76.98°E
- Country: India
- State: Karnataka
- District: Kalaburagi

Population (2001)
  - Total: 25,258

Languages
  - Official: Kannada
- Time zone: UTC+5:30 (IST)

Wadi ACC is a town in Kalaburagi district in the Indian state of Karnataka.

== Demographics ==
As of 2001 India census, Wadi ACC had a population of 4706. Males constitute 65% of the population and females 35%. Wadi ACC has an average literacy rate of 78%, higher than the national average of 59.5%: male literacy is 82%, and female literacy is 71%. In Wadi ACC, 6% of the population is under 6 years of age.

Wadi is home to the ACC Cements factory. Wadi is also home to The Wadi Stone Marketing Co. Pvt. Ltd. having its registered office in Wadi, since 1952. Its main product is limestone which is mined in the areas around Wadi.
