= Sannati =

Sannathi
- Village
- Location in Karnataka, India Sannathi (India)
- Coordinates: 16.829°N 76.906°E
- Country: India
- State: Karnataka
- District: Kalaburagi
- Settlement: 3rd century BCE

Area
  - Total: 1.5 km^{2} (0.58 sq mi)

Languages
  - Official: Kannada
- Time zone: UTC+5:30 (IST)
- PIN: 585 218
- Telephone code: 08474
- Nearest city: Yadgir

Sannati or Sannathi is a small village, located on the banks of the Bhima River in Chitapur taluk of Kalaburagi district of Northern Karnataka. It is known for the Chandrala Parameshwari Temple and the excavations by the Archaeological Survey of India done in 1986.

== Excavations ==
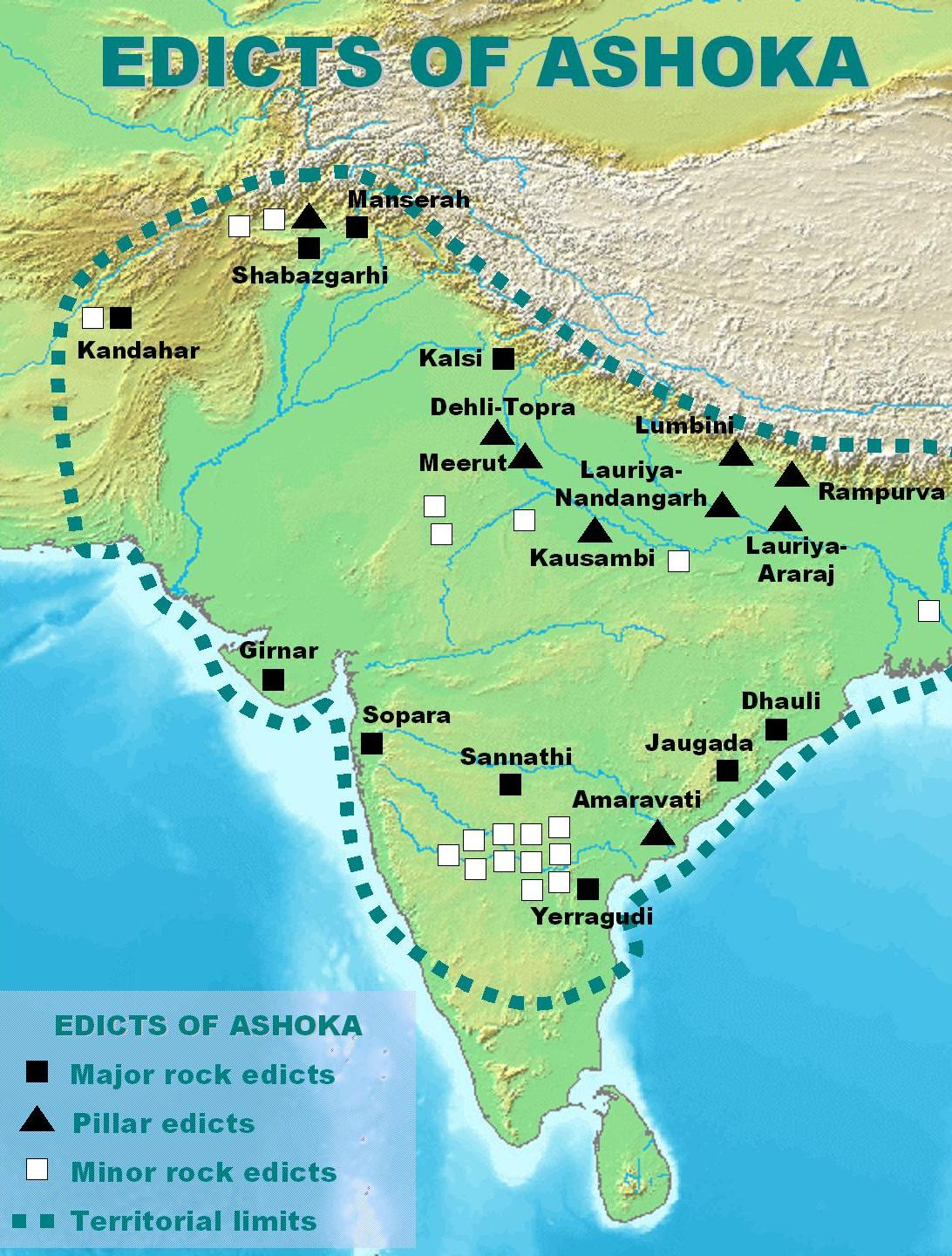
Edicts Of Ashoka

In 1986, when the roof of the Kali temple in Chandralamba temple complex collapsed, it destroyed the idol. However it revealed four Ashokan edicts on the floor and foundation stone of the temple. These edicts were written in a Prakrit language and Brahmi script and one of them was used as foundation of the pedestal for the Kali idol. During subsequent excavations by Archaeological Survey of India (ASI) and the State Archaeology Department, tablets, sculptures, and other terracotta items were found, and most importantly numerous limestone panels of sculptures of the ruined 'Maha Stupa' or Adholoka Maha Chaitya (the Great Stupa of the Netherworld) were found. Archaeologists believe that Ranamandal was a fortified area, spread over 86 hectares (210 acres; 0.33 sq mi), out of which only 2 acres had been excavated by 2009. Clay pendants, black polished pottery, Satavahana and pre-Satavahana coins, ornaments made of copper, ivory and iron, a township with paved pathways, houses, and limestone flooring have been found. Many excavated items were later shifted to Gulbarga Museum.

The government has asked the Archaeological Survey of India to take up further exploration of the Ranamandal area to know the history of the region and its connection with Buddhism.

One of the stones - the only known example of its type - is of Emperor Asoka (r. 274–232 BCE) seated on his throne. It is probably the only surviving image of the emperor.

In 2010, ASI along with Sannati Development Authority deputed Manipal Institute of Technology to prepare a blueprint for restoration and reconstruction of the stupas

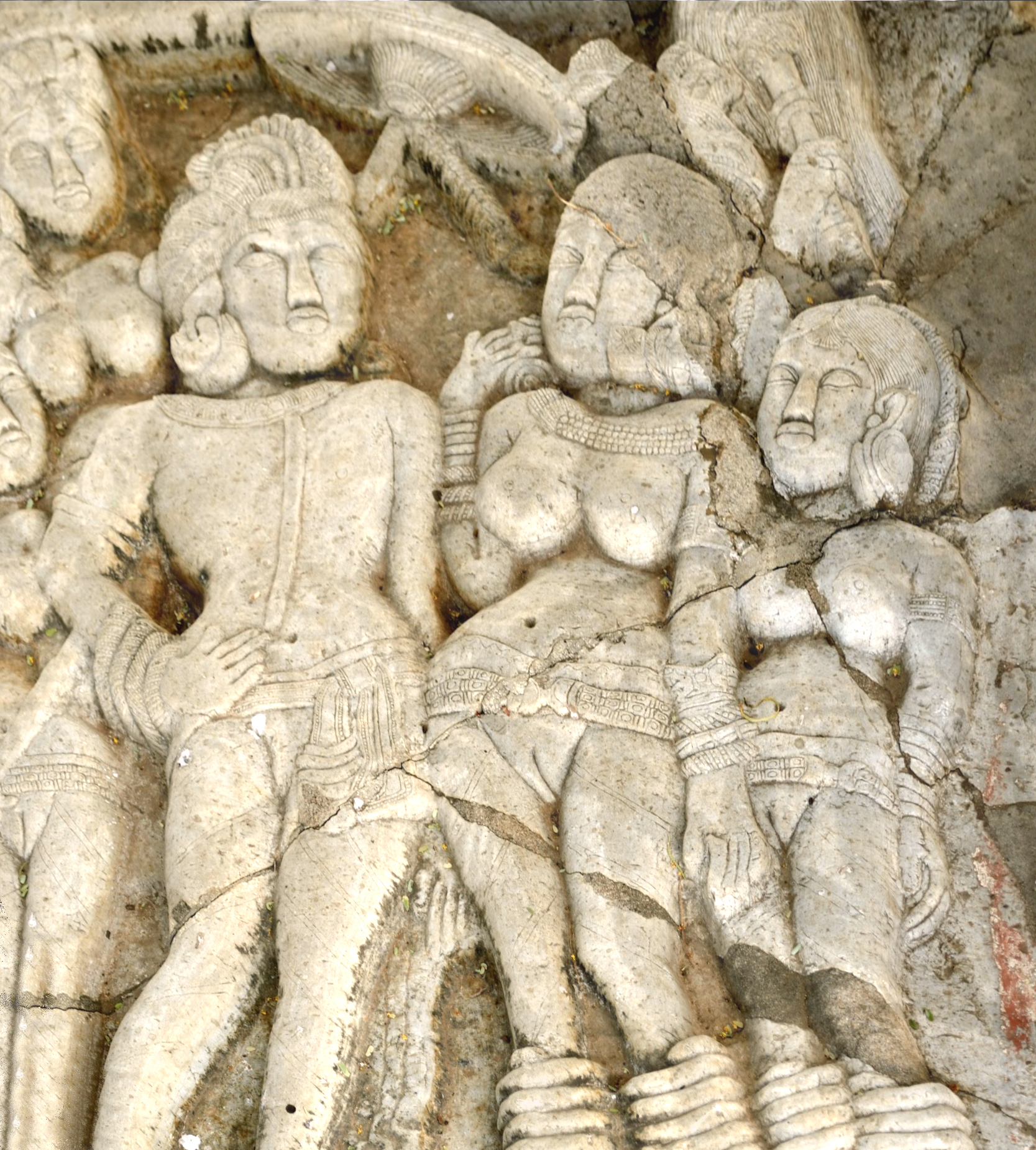
Ashoka with his Queen, at Sannati (Kanaganahalli Stupa), 1st-3rd century CE.

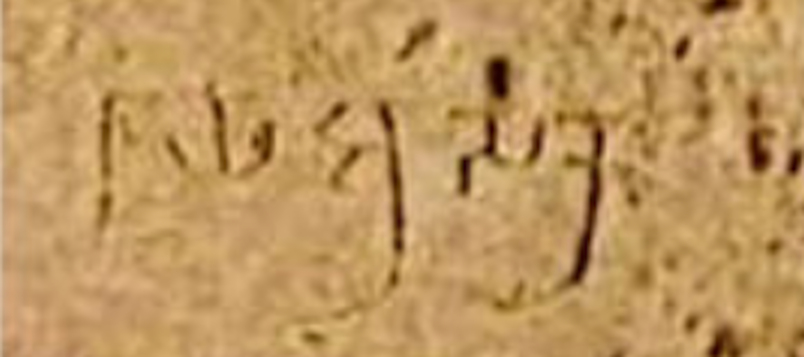
The words "Raya Asoko" in Brahmi script inscribed on the relief identify king Ashoka as the subject matter.

== Mythological references ==
Sannati is the place where the Paduka of Goddess Chandralamba Parameshwari - Incarnation of Goddess Lakshmi - was brought. The Goddess came up to the banks of River Bhima at Hongunti, to save her devotee Chandravadani, wife of a rishi, held captive by the local king Setu Raya. Hingulambika temple is situated at Hongunti near Shabad town. The Goddess sent her Paduka from which emerged 5 bumblebees, which killed the evil king Setu Raya by drowning him in the Bhima River. Sannati Chandrala Parmeshwari and Hongunti Hingulambika are family deity of many Brahmin and Hindus families of Karnataka, Maharashtra, Andhra Pradesh, etc.

Sannati is also the place where Rishi Markandeya meditated and composed parts of Markandeya Upanishad. A small temple has been renovated at the place where he is believed to have sat in meditation. It is said that Rishi Markandeya predates the arrival of Paduka of Chandrala Parmeshwari.

== Visitors' attractions ==
Other places worth visiting nearby are: Yergol, where Tikacharya elaborated (key book) on the works of Madwacharya, Malkhed- Brundavan of Sri Jayatheertharu (Tikachryaru); Hongunti; Konchur Hanuman Temple; Balavadagi yallamma (Renuka) temple; Halakatti Veerabhadreshwara temple; Martur – the place where Vignaneshwar edited and condensed Yagnavyalka Smriti, which was named Mitakshara, now known as Hindu Law.

== Kanaganahalli ==
Kanaganahalli is 3 km from Sannati, which is also on the banks of the river Bhima.

As this is an important Buddhist site, Govt of Karnataka and ASI are planning to develop it as an international Buddhist center.

It is the place where an ancient Buddhist Mahastupa site was found.

== Chandrala Parameshwari Temple ==
Additionally, Sannati is home to the renowned Shri Lakshmi Chandrala Parameshwari Temple, dedicated to Goddess Lakshmi as Chandralamba Parameshwari who is worshipped there in the form of Chandrala Parameshwari. The Hindu text Dasharathiya Tantra states in a conversation with goddess Parvati that “O daughter of mountains, Mahalakshmi is to be known in Kolhapura; that Mahalakshmi, the beloved of Hari, is also established in the peetha of Sannati kshetra" implying that the goddess of Mahalakshmi Temple, Kolhapur also resides in Sannati.

== See also ==
- Lakshmi Chandralamba Parameshwari
- Kanaganahalli
- North Karnataka
- Tourism in North Karnataka
- Buddhism in North Karnataka
