= Lakshmi Chandralamba Parameshwari =

Hindu goddess

Chandralamba Parameshwari
- Goddess of Protection
- Other names: Lakshmi Chandrala Parameshwari
- Affiliation: Mahalakshmi
- Abode: Sannati
- Mantra: Om Shri Chandralambaye Namah
- Weapons: Panchajanya, Sudarshana Chakra
- Temple: Chandrala Parameshwari Temple
- Festivals: Varalakshmi Vratam, Dasara, Lakshmi Puja, Navratri Mahotsav
- Consort: Vishnu

Chandralamba Parameshwari (Kannada: ಚಂದ್ರಲಾಂಬಾ ಪರಮೇಶ್ವರಿ), also known as Sri Lakshmi Chandrala Parmeshwari (ಶ್ರೀ ಲಕ್ಷ್ಮೀ ಚಂದ್ರಲಾಂಬಾ ಪರಮೇಶ್ವರಿ) or Chandrala Parmeshwari(ಚಂದ್ರಲಾ ಪರಮೇಶ್ವರಿ), is a revered Hindu goddess who is primarily worshipped as an incarnation of the goddess Lakshmi. She is particularly significant in the state of Karnataka, India, and is also considered a family deity (kuladevi) by many Hindu families in the neighboring states of Maharashtra and Andhra Pradesh. The goddess is essentily Lakshmi holding a Shankha and Chakra.

== Legend ==
The story, recounted in the Skanda Purana, tells of a princess named Chandravadani who was held captive by an evil king. When her husband, a sage named Narayana Muni, sought divine help from goddess Lakshmi, who came to his aid in the form of Goddess Chandralamba. She sent five bumblebees from her sacred footwear (paduka) to defeat the king, who was eventually drowned in the Bhima River. This legend establishes her as a powerful force against evil and a protector of the righteous.

== Temples ==
Sri Lakshmi Chandrala Parameshwari Temple
