= Kamalapura, Kalaburagi =

Kamalapur
- town
- Location in Karnataka, India Kamalapur (India)
- Coordinates: 17.578°N 76.989°E
- Country: India
- State: Karnataka
- District: Kalaburagi

Government
  - Body: Grampanchayat

Population (2011)
  - Total: 11,071

Languages
  - Official: Kannada
- Time zone: UTC+5:30 (IST)
- PIN: 585313
- Telephone code: 08478
- Nearest city: Gulbarga

Kamalapur is a panchayat town and new taluka in Kalaburagi district in Karnataka. It is 34 km from Gulbarga.

== Demographics ==
As of 2011 India census Kamalapur had a population of 11071 with 5667 males and 5404 females .

== Education ==
Schools within Kamalapur include:

- The government higher primary school of Kamalapur
- Hke society ITI College
