= Yedrami =

Yedrami Yelaravi
- Tehsil
- Nickname: Yadrami
- Location in Karnataka, India Yedrami (India)
- Coordinates: 16°52′N 76°32′E
- tehsil: India
- State: Karnataka
- District: Kalaburagi
- Established: 2016
- Tehsils: Yadrami

Government
  - Type: State government
  - Body: Karnataka

Population (2001)
  - Total: 8,103

Languages
  - Official: Kannada
- Time zone: UTC+5:30 (IST)
- Postal code: 585325
- Vehicle registration: KA32
- Website: https://karnataka.nic.in/

Yadrami is a tehsil in the northern part of Karnataka, India. It is located in the Kalaburagi district.

== Demographics ==
As of 2001 India census, Yedrami had a population of 8103 with 4214 males and 3889 females.

== See also ==
- Kalaburagi
- Districts of Karnataka
