= Shahabad railway station =

Railway station in Karnataka, India

General information
- Location: Shahabad, Gulbarga, Karnataka; India
- Coordinates: 17.0524°N 76.9919°E
- Elevation: 428.00 metres (1,404.20 ft)
- System: Indian Railways Station
- Owner: Ministry of Railways, Indian Railways
- Line: Solapur–Guntakal section
- Platforms: 3
- Tracks: 4

Construction
- Structure type: Standard (on-ground station)

Other information
- Status: Functioning
- Station code: SDB
- Zone(s): Central Railways
- Division(s): Solapur
Location

Shahabad railway station (Station code: SDB) is located in Kalaburagi district in the Indian state of Karnataka and serves

Shahabad, Gulbarga. It is a station where the Wadi–Secunderabad line meets the Mumbai–Chennai line. Shahabad has 3 platforms.

== History ==
The Great Indian Peninsula Railway extended its Mumbai–Solapur line to Raichur in 1871. The Wadi–Secunderabad line was built in 1874 with financing by the Nizam of Hyderabad. It later became part of Nizam's Guaranteed State Railway.

== Electrification ==
Electrification work is in progress in the Pune–Wadi–Guntakal sector. In Pune–Wadi–Guntakal sector from Bhigwan to Wadi Jn.
