= Wadi Junction railway station =

Railway station in Karnataka, India

Wadi Junction
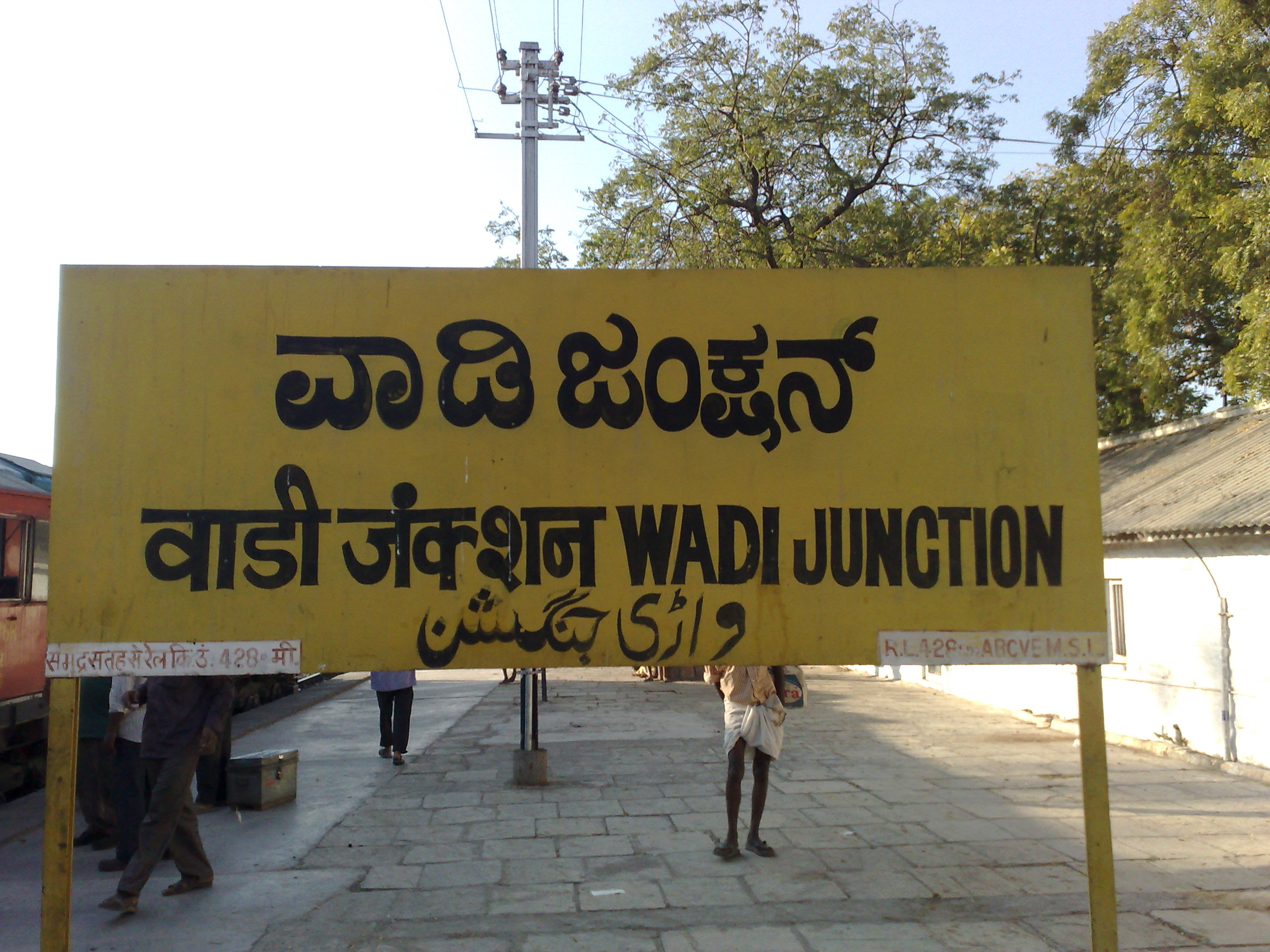

General information
- Location: Wadi, Karnataka; India
- Coordinates: 17.0524°N 76.9919°E
- Elevation: 428.00 metres (1,404.20 ft)
- System: Indian Railways Station
- Owner: Ministry of Railways, Indian Railways
- Lines: Solapur–Guntakal section Mahabubnagar-Munirabad railway line Gadag-Wadi railway line
- Platforms: 4
- Tracks: 4

Construction
- Structure type: Standard (on-ground station)
- Accessible: by railway central department occurrence SCR

Other information
- Status: Functioning
- Station code: WADI
- Zone(s): Central Railways
- Division(s): Solapur
Location

Wadi Junction railway station (station code: WADI) is located in Kalaburagi district in the Indian state of Karnataka and serves Wadi. It is a junction station where the Wadi–Secunderabad line meets the Mumbai–Chennai line. Wadi has 4 platforms.

== History ==
The Great Indian Peninsula Railway extended its Mumbai–Solapur line to Raichur in 1871.

The Wadi–Secunderabad line was built in 1874 with financing by the Nizam of Hyderabad. It later became part of Nizam's Guaranteed State Railway.

== Electrification ==
Electrification work is Done Pune–Wadi–Guntakal sector. In Pune–Wadi–Guntakal sector from Bhigwan to wadi Jn electrification is balance, from Guntakal to Wadi Jn electrification is complete and traction change from diesel to electric and vice versa started occurring at Wadi junction from 5 Aug. 2017 for Konark & Visakhapatnam LTT express. soon other train will also run with electric loco in coming time.

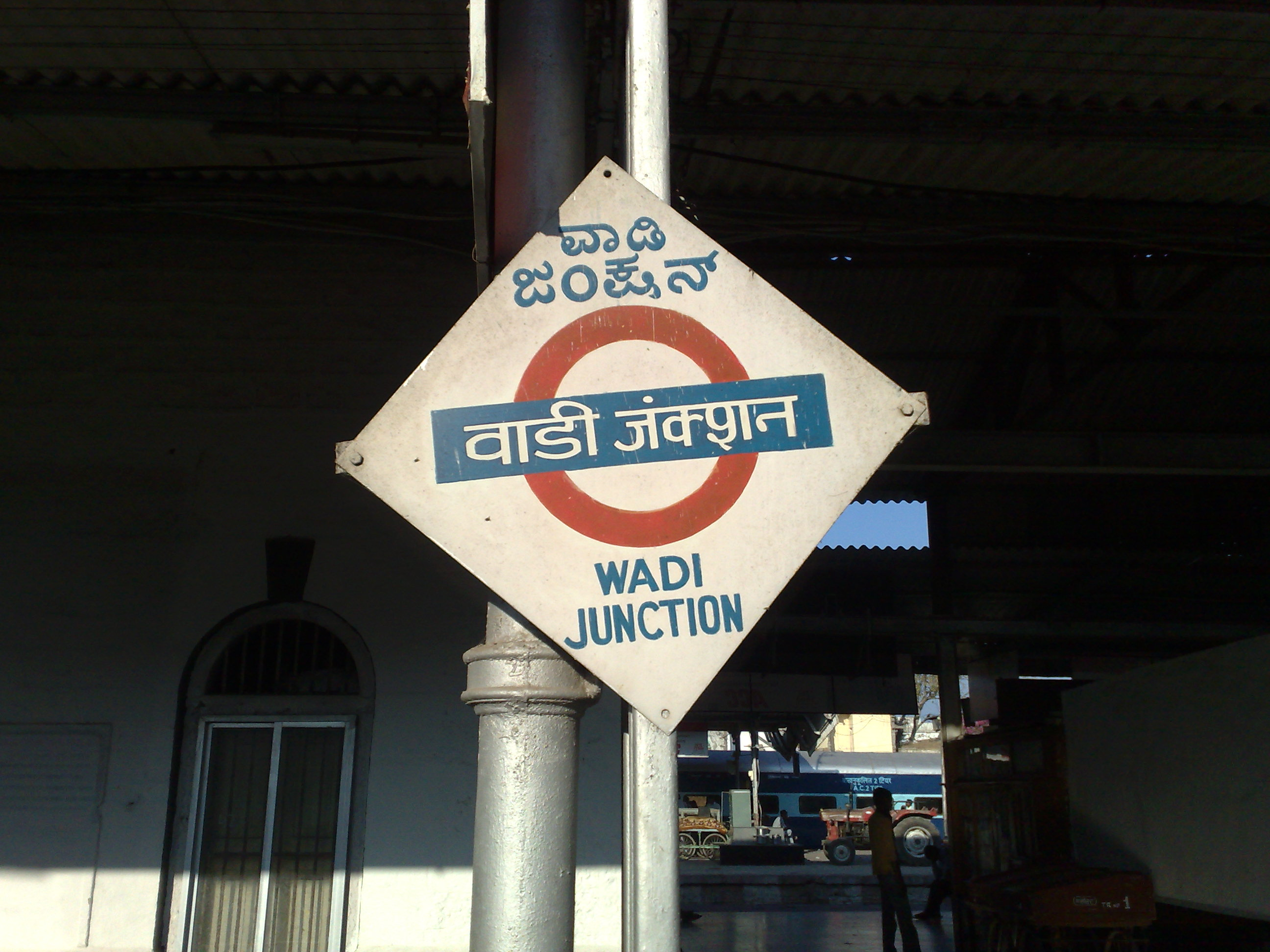
Wadi Junction – Platformboard
