= Shahabad, Kalaburagi =

Shahabad
- city
- Location in Karnataka, India
- Coordinates: 17.13°N 76.93°E
- Country: India
- State: Karnataka
- District: Kalaburagi
- Lok Sabha: Gulbarga
- Legislative Assembly: Gulbarga Rural

Government
  - Type: City Municipal Council
  - Body: Shahabad city municipal council

Area
  - Total: 7.8 km^{2} (3.0 sq mi)

Population (2011)
  - Total: 47,582
  - Density: 6,100/km^{2} (16,000/sq mi)

Language
  - Official: Kannada
- Time zone: UTC+5:30 (IST)
- PIN: 585228/585229
- Telephone code: 08474
- Vehicle registration: KA 32
- Website: shahabadcity.mrc.gov.in

Shahabad is a city in Kalaburagi district in the Indian state of Karnataka. Shahabad Taluka is famous for Shahabad Stone (limestone). Shahabad is located at a very prime location in terms of rail (train) connectivity having direct trains to several metro cities (Mumbai, Bengaluru, Chennai, Hyderabad Ahmadabad Vishakapatnam). Road NH150 Gulbarga to Gooty will connect to NH7 Hyderabad to Bangalore. SH125 & SH149.

== Commerce ==
- Agriculture,
- Limestone mines,
- Boiler production and
- Cement production

are the main areas of commerce. The rivers Kagina and Bhima pass through Shahabad and are major sources of water for the city. The roads, NH150, SH125 and SH149 pass through Shahabad city.

== Geography ==
Shahabad is located at 17.13°N 76.93°E. It has an average elevation of 391 metres (1282 feet). The city area is 7.80 km^{2}, and the length of roads is 32.50 km.

== Demographics ==
As of 2001 India census, Shahabad had a population of 96,582. Males constitute 51% of the population and females 49%. Shahabad has an average literacy rate of 57%, lower than the national average of 59.5%: male literacy is 66%, and female literacy is 48%. In Shahabad, 15% of the population is under 6 years of age.

=== Shahabad religion data 2011 ===
- Population, 96,582
- Male, 47602
- Female,48980
- Hindu, 60.88%
- Muslim, 35.59%
- Waddarbhovi community 20% of Hindu

== History ==
Under the Nizam of Hyderabad, Shahabad was a subdivisional administrative office governing nearly 300 villages.

== Commerce ==
Shahabad is well known for its stones, called Shahabad stones. At one time, almost all railway stations used to be tiled with these stones. Now due to modernization, most of the major railway stations are switching to other materials. Still Shahabad stones are among the most economical stones for tiling.

Alstom Projects India Ltd & Jaypee Cements (formerly owned by ACC and then by HMP Cements) are the two major factories located in the town providing employment to a majority of the population, either direct or indirect. Alstom Projects India Ltd has been acquired by GE India.

Shahabad is also a major pigeon pea (Cajanus cajan or tuvar dall or toor dall) growing region in Gulbarga. Apart from toor dal, the major crops cultivated are jowar, ground nuts, Bengal gram, cotton, sunflower and sugarcane.

== See also ==
- Shahabad railway station
