= Jevargi =

Jevargi Jewargi
- Town
- Location in Karnataka, India
- Coordinates: 17.02°N 76.77°E
- Country: India
- State: Karnataka
- District: Kalaburagi

Area
  - Total: 4.25 km^{2} (1.64 sq mi)
- Elevation: 393 m (1,289 ft)

Population (2011)
  - Total: 25,685
  - Density: 6,040/km^{2} (15,700/sq mi)
- Demonym: Jevargiyavaru

Languages
  - Official: Kannada
- Time zone: UTC+5:30 (IST)
- PIN: 585 310
- Telephone code: 08442
- ISO 3166 code: IN-KA
- Vehicle registration: KA 32
- Website: jewargitown.mrc.gov.in

Jevargi is a town in Kalaburagi district of Karnataka, India. It is the headquarters of the Jevargi Taluk.

== Geography ==
Jevargi has an average elevation of 393 metres (1,289 ft). The town is spread over an area of 4.25 square kilometres (1.64 sq mi).

Jevargi Taluk is bordered by Afzalpur Taluk and Gulbarga Taluk to the north, Chitapur Taluk to the east, Shahpur Taluk to the south-east, Shorapur Taluk to the south and Sindagi Taluk to the west. The Bhima River flows north of Jevargi.

== Demographics ==
As of the 2011 census of India, Jevargi had a population of 25,685 people, 12,976 and 12,710 females giving a sex ratio of 980. Jevargi has an average literacy rate of 73.83%, lower than the national average of 75.36%. The male literacy rate was 82.75% while the female literacy rate was only 64.78%, slightly worse than the national literacy gap in gender. 15.9 percent of the population was under six years of age.
