= Afzalpur =

- Town
- Location in Karnataka, India Afzalpur (India)
- Coordinates: 17°12′04″N 76°21′40″E
- Country: India
- State: Karnataka
- District: Kalaburagi
- Headquarters: Afzalpur

Government
  - Type: Municipal
  - Body: Council of Afzalpur

Area
  - Total: 3 km^{2} (1.2 sq mi)
- Elevation: 408 m (1,339 ft)

Population (2011)
  - Total: 27,088
  - Density: 6,371.33/km^{2} (16,501.7/sq mi)
- Demonyms: Afzalpuria, Afzalpuri

Languages
  - Official: Kannada
- Time zone: UTC+5:30 (IST)
- PIN: 585301
- Telephone code: 08470
- Vehicle registration: KA-32
- Website: www.afzalpurtown.mrc.gov.in

Afzalpur is a panchayat town in Kalaburagi district in the Indian state of Karnataka. It is also the headquarters of the Afzalpur taluk.

== Geography ==
Afzalpur has an average elevation of 408 metres (1338 feet). The town is spread over an area of 3 km^{2}.

The Afzalpur taluk borders the Aland taluk of the Kalaburagi district to the north, the Kalaburagi taluk of Kalaburagi district to the east, the Jevargi taluk of Kalaburagi district and Sindgi taluk of Vijayapura district to the south, the Indi taluk of the Vijayapura district to the west and the Akalkot taluk of the Solapur district of Maharashtra to the north-west.

Bhima and Amarja rivers flow through this taluk.

== Demographics ==
As of the 2011 India census, Afzalpur Town Panchayat has population of 27,088 of which 13,892 are males while 13,196 are females. 75.95% of the population is Hindu, while 23.56% is Muslim.
