= Chitapur =

Chittapur
- Town
- Location in Karnataka, India
- Coordinates: 17.12°N 77.08°E
- Country: India
- State: Karnataka
- District: Kalaburagi

Government
  - Type: Municipal Council
  - Body: Chitapur Panchayat

Area
  - Total: 3.5 km^{2} (1.4 sq mi)
- Elevation: 403 m (1,322 ft)

Population (2021)
  - Total: 52,000
  - Density: 7,706.86/km^{2} (19,960.7/sq mi)

Languages
  - Official: Kannada
- Time zone: UTC+5:30 (IST)
- PIN: 585211
- Telephone code: 08474
- ISO 3166 code: IN-KA
- Vehicle registration: KA-32
- Sex ratio: 1:1 ♂/♀
- Website: www.chittapuratown.mrc.gov.in

Chitapur or Chittapura is a town and taluk in Kalaburagi district in the state of Karnataka, India. It is also the headquarters of the Chittapur taluk. It is known for polished stones and toor dal.

== Geography ==
Chitapur is located at 17.12°N 77.08°E. It is situated on the main railway from Hyderabad to Mumbai, 50 km from Gulbarga district.

It has an average elevation of 403 metres (1322 ft). The town is spread over an area of 3.5 km^{2}.

Chitapur Taluk has borders only with other Taluks of Gulbarga district. It borders Gulbarga taluk to the north-west, Chincholi Taluk district to the north, Sedam taluk to the east, Yadgir Taluk to the south-east, Shahpur Taluk to the south and Jevargi Taluk to the west.

The Kagna river flows in this taluk.

== Governance ==
The TMC has 23 wards and an equal number of councilors. Chittapur TMC stretches to an area of 17.45 km^{2}

== Demographics ==
As of 2001 India census, Chitapur had a population of 27,006. 13,622, males and 13,384 females. It has an average literacy rate of 54.98%.

According to the 2011 census the population was 52,000, of whom 80% were Hindu, 14% Muslim, and others 6%.

== Notable sites ==
- Sannati village in Chitapur Taluk along the banks of the river Bhima where rock edicts of the period of King Ashoka and a possible early Buddhist settlement has been excavated.

== Excavations ==
In 1986 the Kali temple in Chandralamba temple complex collapsed, and reconstruction work in 1989 found four Edicts of Ashoka in Brahmi script on the floor and foundation stone of the temple, one of which was used as foundation of the pedestal for the Kali idol. During subsequent excavations by Archaeological Survey of India (ASI) and the State Archaeology Department, tablets, sculptures, and other terracotta items were found, and most importantly numerous limestone panels of sculptures of the ruined 'Maha Stupa' or Adholoka Maha Chaitya (the Great Stupa of the Netherworld) were found. Archaeologists believe that Ranamandal was a fortified area, spread over 86 hectares (210 acres; 0.33 sq mi), out of which only 2 acres had been excavated by 2009. Clay pendants of Roman origin, black polished pottery, Shatavahana and pre-Shatavahana coins, ornaments made of copper, ivory and iron, a township with paved pathways, houses, and limestone flooring have been found. Many excavated items were later shifted to Gulbarga Museum.

In 2010, ASI along with Sannati Development Authority deputed Manipal Institute of Technology to prepare a blueprint for restoration and reconstruction of the stupas.

== See also ==
- Chittapur railway station
