= Kalaburagi district =

Kalaburagi district Gulbarga district
- District of Karnataka
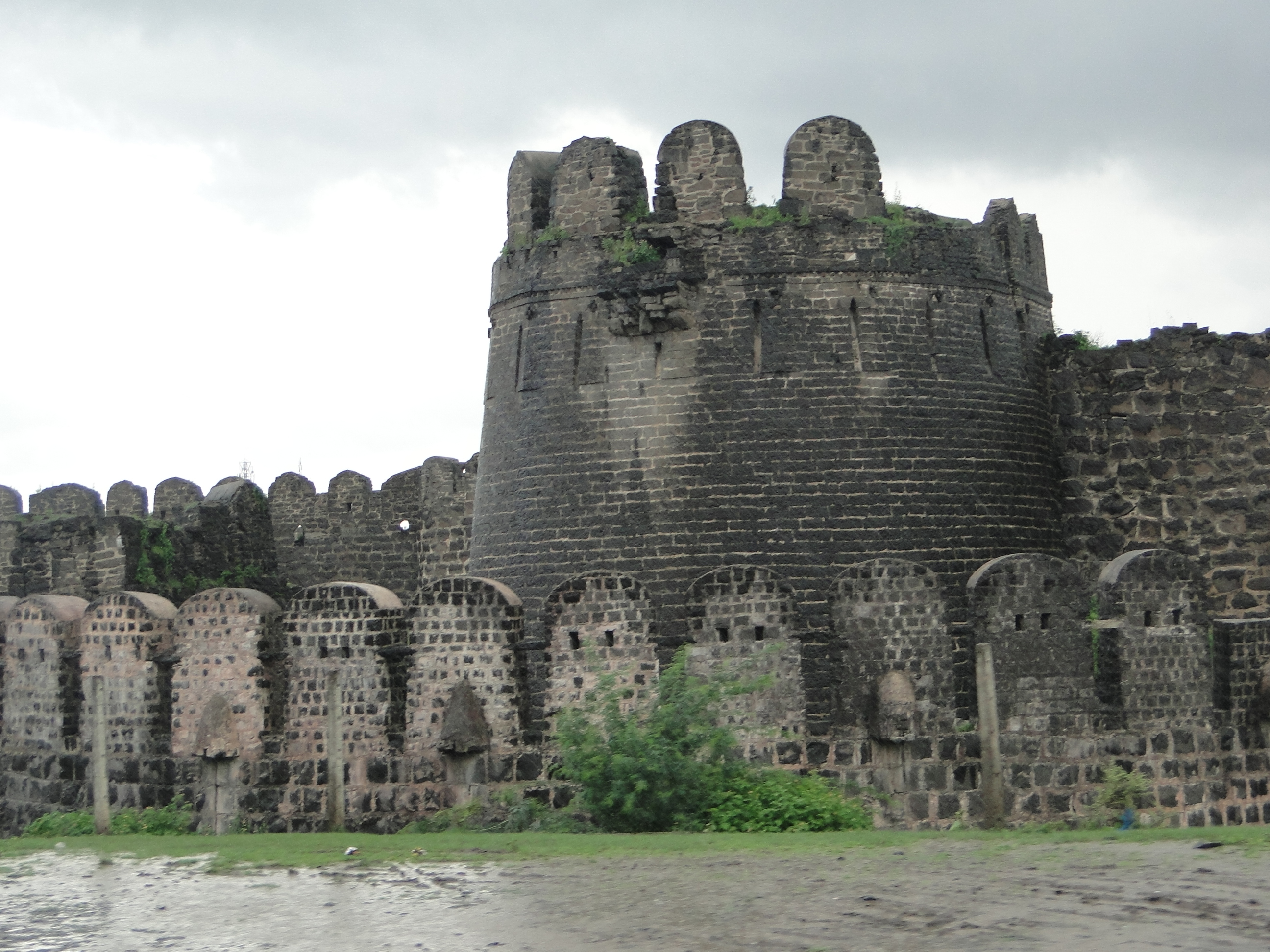
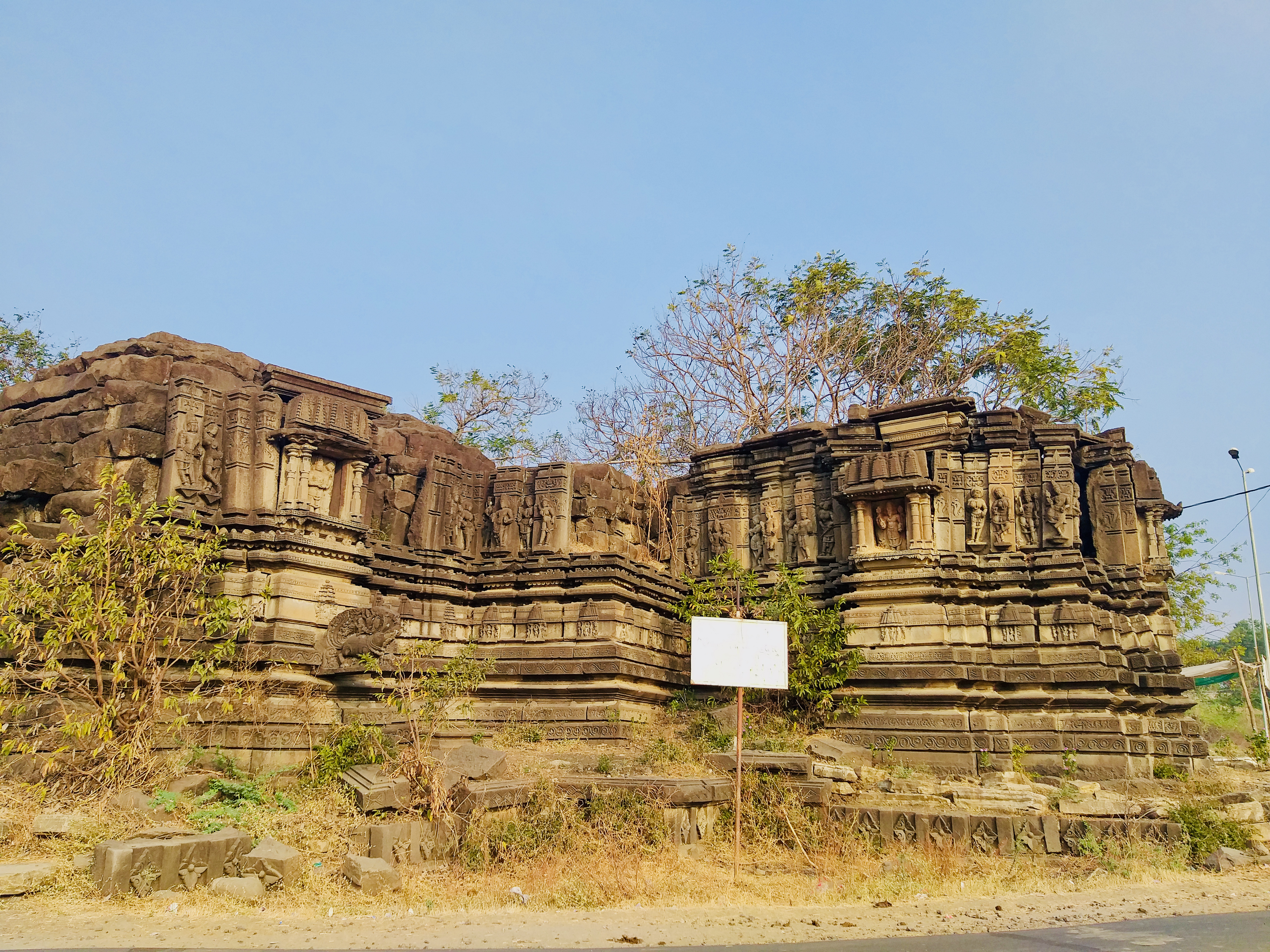
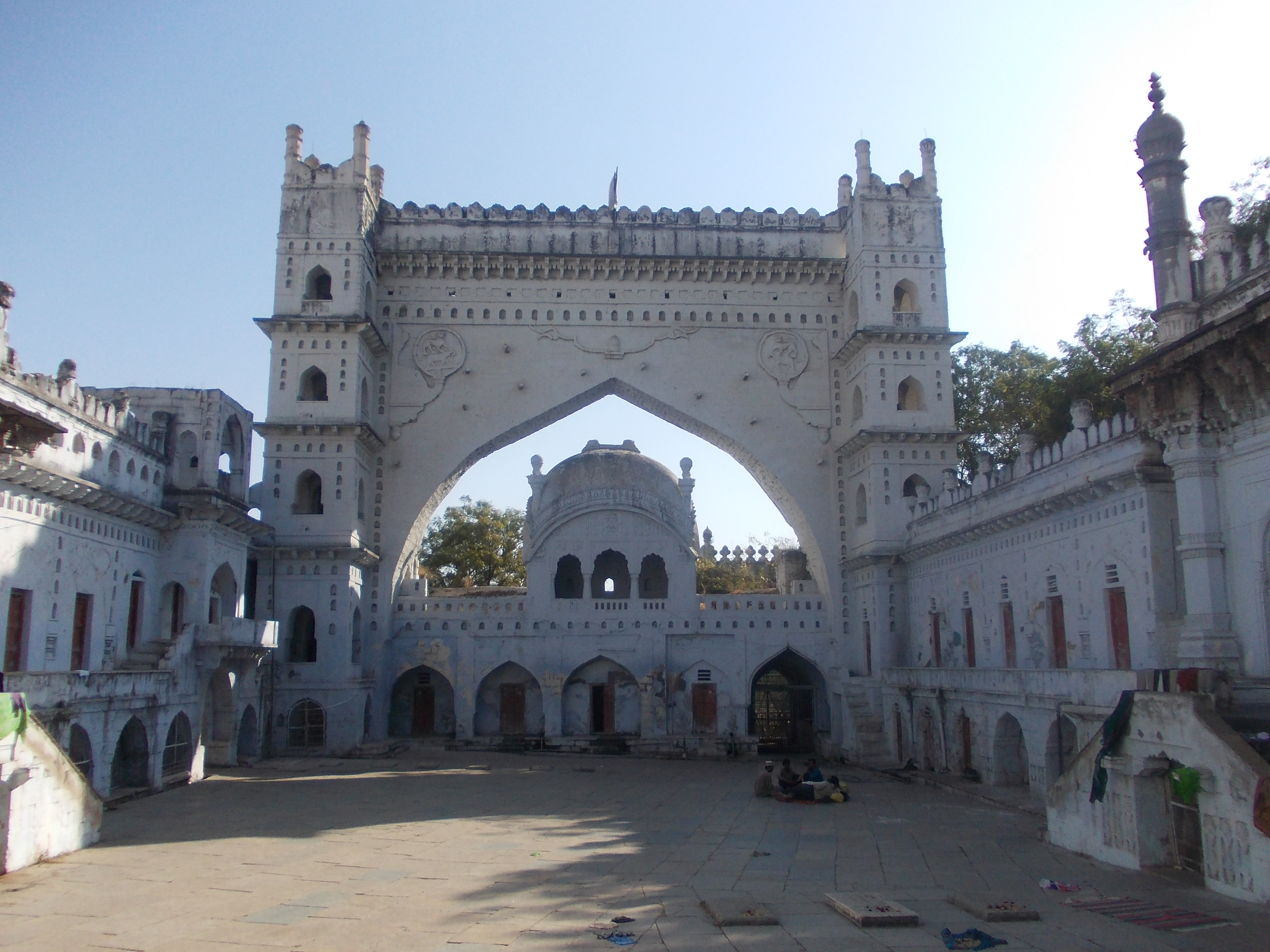
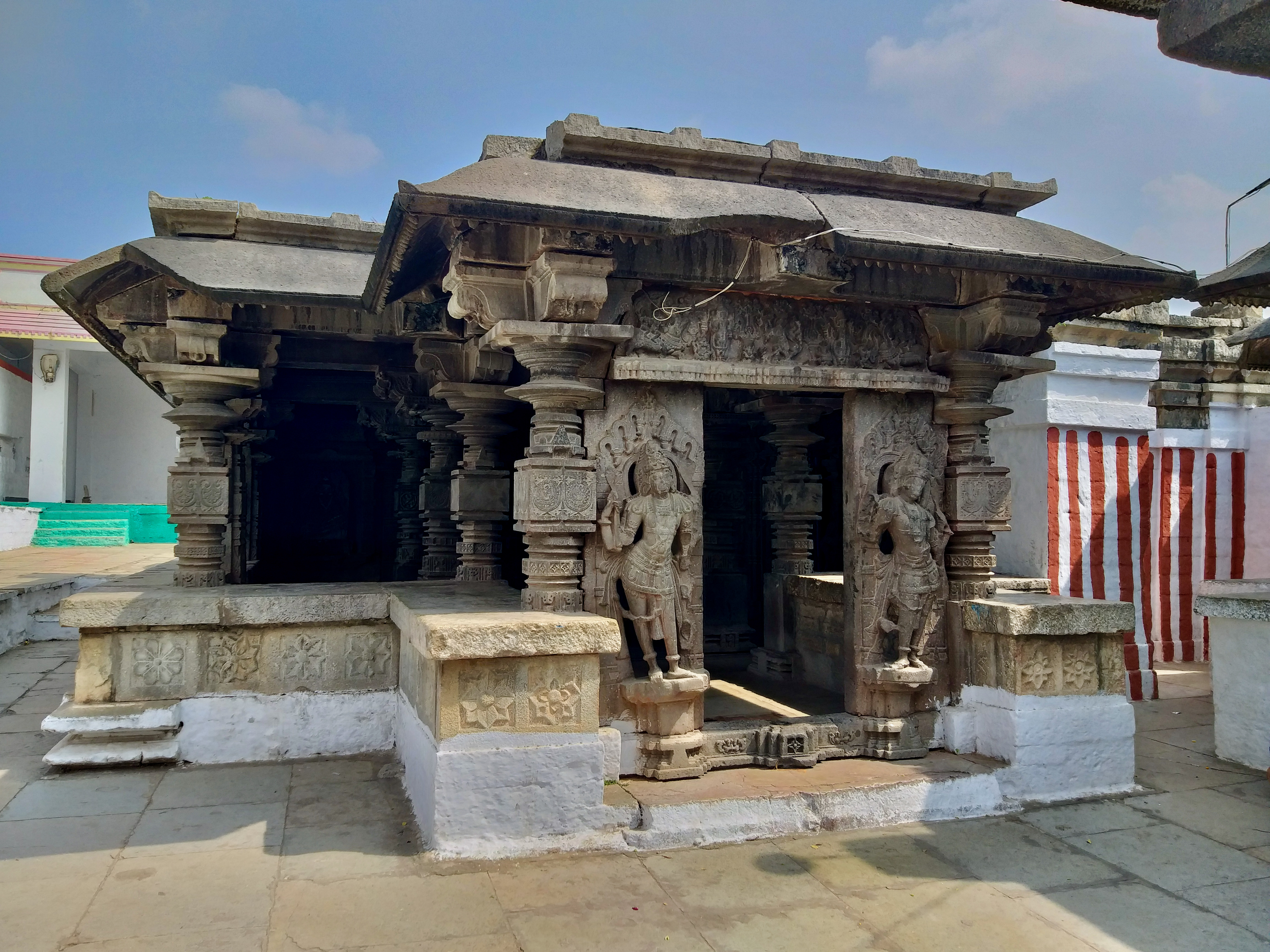
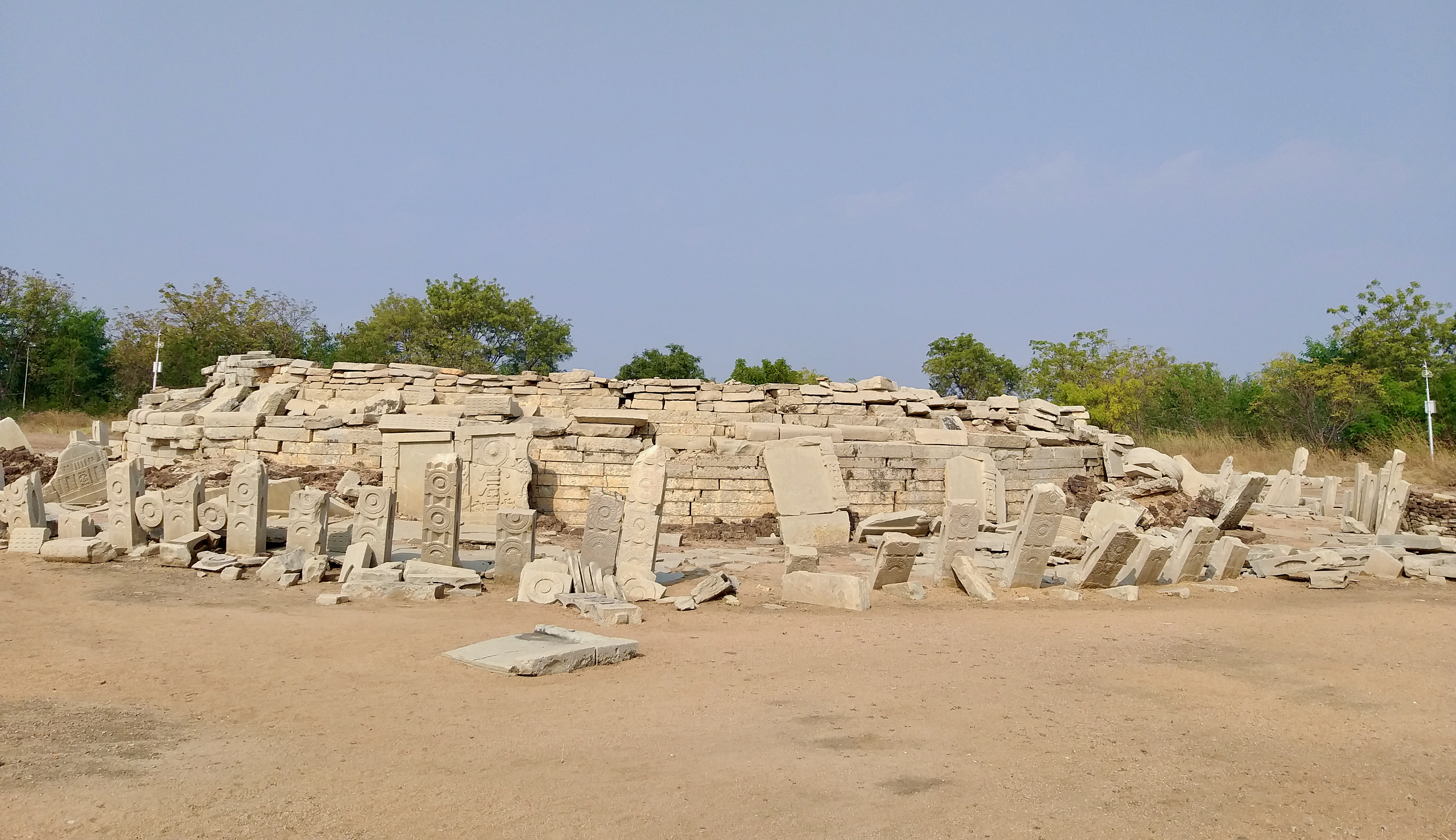
- Clockwise from top-left: Kalaburagi Fort, Suryanarayana Temple in Kalgi, Panchlingeshwara Temple near Sedam, Ruins in Sannati, Mosque in Gulbarga city
- Nickname: Land of Toor Dal
- Interactive map of Kalaburagi district
- Coordinates: 17°17′N 76°49′E
- Country: India
- State: Karnataka
- Region: Kalyana-Karnataka
- Division: Kalaburagi Division
- Headquarters: Kalaburagi
- Talukas: Aland, Shahabad, Kamalapur, Chitapur, Afzalpur, Jevargi, Yedrami, Kalaburagi, Kalgi, Chincholi, Sedam,

Government
  - Type: Zilla Panchayat (District Administration)
  - Body: alaburagi Zilla Panchayat
  - Deputy Commissioner: Fouzia Taranum, IAS

Area^{†}
  - Total: 10,951 km^{2} (4,228 sq mi)
- Elevation: 454 m (1,490 ft)

Population (2011)^{†}
  - Total: 2,566,326
  - Density: 234.35/km^{2} (606.95/sq mi)

Language
  - Official: Kannada,
- Time zone: UTC+5:30 (IST)
- PIN: 585101 585102 585103
- Telephone code: 91 8472
- Vehicle registration: KA-32
- No. of taluks: 11
- Lok Sabha constituency: Kalaburagi (Lok Sabha constituency)
- Precipitation: 777 millimetres (30.6 in)
- Avg. summer temperature: 42 °C (108 °F)
- Avg. winter temperature: 26 °C (79 °F)
- Website: kalaburagi.nic.in

Kalaburagi district, formerly known as Gulbarga district, is one of the 31 districts of Karnataka state in southern India. Kalaburagi city is the administrative headquarters of the district. The district is the headquarters of Kalaburagi division.

This district is situated in north Karnataka between 76°.04' and 77°.42 east longitude, and 17°.12' and 17°.46' north latitude, covering an area of 10,951 km^{2}. This district is bounded on the west by Bijapur district and Solapur district of Maharashtra state, on the north by Bidar district and Osmanabad district of Maharashtra state, on the south by Yadgir district, and on the east by Sangareddy and Vikarabad districts of Telangana state.

Despite being the home district of top political leaders like veteran politician and All India Congress Committee (AICC) president Mallikarjun Kharge and his legislator son Priyank Kharge who serves as a state cabinet minister, this part of Kalyana-Karnataka is one of the poorest district with a per capita income of just Rs 1,44,449 while the state capital city Bengaluru has Rs 8,55,960 as per Economic Survey. The national average is Rs 2,19,575 and the state average is Rs 3,86,156. This economic divide has been steadily widening since 1970s due to an ongoing, disproportionate development focus on southern districts of the state.

== History ==
The name of the area in Kannada is Kala-buragi, roughly meaning "Rocky land". In the 6th century CE, the district was under the control of the Chalukyas. The Rashtrakutas briefly conquered the area, but were driven out by the Chalukyas who ruled the area for the next two centuries. The Kalachuris then conquered the area and ruled it until 12th century, when they were driven out by the Yadavas. Afterwards it was ruled by the Kakatiyas, who ruled until 1324, when their kingdom fell to the Delhi Sultanate. The ambitions of the local governors led to the formation of the Bahmani sultanate, who made Kalaburagi their capital. The Bahmanis eventually fell and left in their place a patchwork of 5 Deccan Sultanates. Kalaburagi was ruled by the Bidar sultanate until its annexation by Bijapur in 1619. Soon the district would become part of the Mughal Empire, but the Asaf Jahi governors of the Deccan later broke away and formed their own Hyderabad State, and Kalaburagi was ruled by them. This state became a princely state of British India, until its annexation by India in 1948. Afterwards, Kalaburagi, along with Bidar and Raichur, became part of Karnataka and were known as the Kalyana-Karnataka region. Since this time, this region has continuously been lagging the rest of the state in social indicators and is considered the most backward region of Karnataka.

== Economy ==
In 2006 the Ministry of Panchayati Raj named Kalaburagi one of the country's 243 most backward districts (out of a total of 640). It is one of the five districts in Karnataka currently receiving funds from the Backward Regions Grant Fund Programme (BRGF).

== Places of interest ==
=== Historical places ===
- Sannati, a small village, located on the banks of the Bhima River in Chitapur taluk is known for its Ashokan edicts, Buddhist stupa and sole surviving image of Emperor Ashoka (r. 274–232 BC) himself.
- Manyakheta, a village located on the banks of the Kagina river in Sedam taluk was the Capital city of the Rashtrakuta dynasty. This village is 40 km southeast to the District Headquarters Kalaburagi and 18 km west to the Taluk Headquarters Sedam.
- Kalaburagi Fort built in 1347 Kalaburagi's old moated fort is in a much deteriorated state, but it has a number of interesting buildings inside, including the Jama Masjid, reputed to have been built by a Moorish architect during the late 13th or early 14th century who imitated the great mosque in Cordoba, Spain. The mosque is unique in India, with a huge dome covering the whole area, four smaller ones at the corners, and 75 smaller still all the way around. The fort itself has 15 towers. Kalaburagi also has a number of imposing tombs (Haft Gumbaz) of Bahmani kings.

== Geography ==
Kalaburagi is situated in Deccan Plateau located at 17.33°N 76.83°E and the general elevation ranges from 300 to 750 meters above mean sea level. The main river is the Bhima.

== Subdivisions ==
Kalaburagi district presently comprises the following 11 talukas after the separation of Yadgir district from it.

1. Kalaburagi
2. Aland
3. Afzalpur
4. Jevargi
5. Sedam
6. Shahabad
7. Kalgi
8. Kamalapur
9. Chitapur
10. Chincholi
11. Yedrami

== Demographics ==
Historical population
Year	Pop.	±% p.a.
1901	586,760	—
1911	640,851	+0.89%
1921	589,958	−0.82%
1931	658,151	+1.10%
1941	704,139	+0.68%
1951	806,394	+1.37%
1961	963,619	+1.80%
1971	1,208,007	+2.29%
1981	1,442,258	+1.79%
1991	1,786,138	+2.16%
2001	2,174,742	+1.99%
2011	2,566,326	+1.67%

Religion in Kalaburagi district (2011)
Hinduism	78.36%
Islam	19.99%
Other or not stated	1.65%

According to the 2011 census Kalaburagi district has a population of 2,566,326, roughly equal to the nation of Kuwait or the US state of Nevada. This gives it a ranking of 162nd in India (out of a total of 640). The district has a population density of 233 inhabitants per square kilometre (600/sq mi). Its population growth rate over the decade 2001-2011 was 17.94%. Gulbarga has a sex ratio of 971 females for every 1000 males, and a literacy rate of 64.85%. 32.56% of the population lives in urban areas. Scheduled Castes and Scheduled Tribes make up 25.28% and 2.54% of the population respectively.

=== Languages ===
Languages of Kalaburagi district (2011)
1. Kannada (65.7%)
2. Urdu (18.1%)
3. Lambadi (7.09%)
4. Telugu (4.08%)
5. Marathi (2.47%)
6. Hindi (2.05%)
7. Others (0.46%)

According to the 2011 census, 65.70% of the population spoke Kannada, 18.15% Urdu, 7.09% Lambadi, 4.08% Telugu, 2.47% Marathi and 2.05% Hindi as their first language.

== Geographical indication ==
Gulbarga Tur Dal was awarded the Geographical Indication (GI) status tag from the Geographical Indications Registry, under the Union Government of India, on 14 August 2019 and is valid until 25 September 2027.

University of Agricultural Sciences (UAS) & Karnataka Togari Abhivrudhi Mandali Limited from Kalaburagi, proposed the GI registration of 'Gulbarga Tur Dal. After filing the application in September 2017, the Tur Dal was granted the GI tag in 2019 by the Geographical Indication Registry in Chennai, making the name "Gulbarga Tur Dal" exclusive to the Tur Dal cultivated in the region. It thus became the second Pigeon pea variety from India after Navapur Tur Dal of Maharashtra and the 49th type of goods from Karnataka to earn the GI tag.

The GI tag protects the Tur Dal from illegal selling and marketing, and gives it legal protection and a unique identity.

== See also ==
- Yadgir (Lok Sabha constituency)
- Kalaburagi (Lok Sabha constituency)
- Wadi ACC
