= Kollur Mallappa =

Indian politician

Malappa Lingappa Kollur

Member of Parliament, Rajya Sabha
- In office 1968–1980
- In office 1984-1990
- Constituency: Karnataka

Personal details
- Born: 1905
- Died: 24 October 2004 (aged 98–99)
- Party: Indian National Congress
- Spouse: Shankaramma

Kollur Mallappa, also referred to as Malappa Lingappa Kollur (1905 – 24 October 2004) was the first President of Hyderabad Pradesh Congress Committee, prior to the merger of Hyderabad state into Andhra Pradesh. He was a Member of Parliament from Raichur, now in Karnataka for several terms. He was a mentor of the late Indian Prime Minister P. V. Narasimha Rao, several leaders like Virendra Patil, Shivraj Patil, S.B. Chavan and G. Venkataswamy, etc. He founded the Kuruba Sangham and the Kuruba hostel in Hyderabad.

== Life ==
Mallappa was born in 1905 in a Kannada Kuruba Gowda community and joined the Indian National Congress in 1935 following a visit to Sabarmati Ashram along with his associate Janardhana Desai. The two met Mahatma Gandhi. He took an interest in Gandhian constructive activities and was the agent for the sale of cotton and woollen khadi and the popularisation of Hindi.

== Political life ==
Mallappa was elected to the Hyderabad State Assembly from Surpur in Kalaburagi district in 1952 Hyderabad Legislative Assembly election. After the reorganisation of the State, he was elected to the Mysore Assembly in 1957 from Sedam. He joined the Bhoodan movement started by Vinoba Bhave. He was also a Member of Parliament representing Karnataka in the Rajya Sabha, the upper house of India's Parliament as a member of the Indian National Congress and had close ties with Indira Gandhi. Mallappa was responsible for getting the Congress party nomination to the former Chief Minister of Karnataka, N. Dharam Singh, and the then Union Minister for Water Resources, M. Mallikarjun Kharge, to contest the Assembly elections in 1972. He was the Minister for Industries and Commerce in Karnataka from 1957 to 1962. He was defeated by Vidyadhar Guruji Sayanna, from Gurmitkal in 1962 Mysore Legislative Assembly elections.

== Hyderabad Karnataka Gandhi ==
In 1941, the Nizam's government arrested him and he was jailed. He represented the Hyderabad State Congress in the August 1942 Mumbai session of the party where the Quit India call was given. The day after the country gained independence in 1947, his wife Shankaramma died. But that did not deter him from taking part in the celebrations. Mallappa had the distinction of being elected President of the Hyderabad State Congress. He also fought against the Razakars of Hyderabad. Kollur Mallappa had a son called Rajashekar Kollur, who was elected as a Member of Parliament and his sons called Sanjeev Kollur and Pavan Kollur, and two daughters Vijaylakshmi & Jayalakshmi Kollur. His daughter named Thayamma and her two children called C Prabhakar and C Jagadish with their respective children live in Bangalore Roopesh, Vaishnavi, Raghav. Kollur Mallappa also had one brother called Ishwarappa Kollur and his sons called Dasharath Kollur & Dr Amaresh Kollur, his son Adarsh Kollur, and his wife Manjula Kollur.

== Political Party ==
He was associated with Indian National Congress for most of his career and joined the Congress (R), the faction supported by Indira Gandhi when S. Nijalingappa and others parted ways by forming Indian National Congress (Organisation) in 1969. Later in the 1970's the name Congress (R) evolved to Indian National Congress (I) the 'I' stands for Indira and gradually Congress (I) became Indian National Congress as Congress (O) merged with Janata Party.

== Death ==
Mallappa, aged 99 years, died at the Bowring and Lady Curzon Hospital in Bangalore on 24 October 2004 after a prolonged illness. He was one of the last links with the Congress of Mahatma Gandhi's days and the freedom struggle. He is best remembered for giving up his claim to the office of Chief Minister in 1972 when the Indian National Congress was returned to power with a thumping majority and instead installing D. Devaraj Urs as Chief Minister. He was at that time a member of the Congress Working Committee.

== Memorial ==
On 20 February 2017 Congress leader Mallikarjun Kharge said the CM of Karnataka Siddaramaiah has accepted his demand to build a memorial for Mallappa in Yadgir. On 16 March 2017 the government announced the construction of the memorial.
