= Sharanagouda Kandakur =

Karnataka politician (born 1982)

Member of the Karnataka Legislative Assembly
- Incumbent
- Assumed office 2023
- Preceded by: Naganagouda Kandkur
- Constituency: Gurmitkal

Personal details
- Party: Janata Dal (Secular)
- Parent: Naganagouda Kandkur (father)

Sharanagouda Kandakur (born 1982) is an Indian politician from Karnataka. He is an MLA from Gurmitkal Assembly constituency in Yadgir district representing Janata Dal (Secular). He won the 2023 Karnataka Legislative Assembly election.

== Early life and education ==
Sharanagouda is from Kandakur village, Gurmitkal taluk, Yadgir district. His late father Naganagouda Kandakur, was a former MLA from Gurmitkal. He completed a BA at Chandrashekhar Education Society Degree College of Arts, Science (affiliated with Gulbarga University), and completed an BBM in 2005.

== Career ==
Sharanagouda won from Gurmitkal Assembly constituency representing Janata Dal (Secular) party in the 2023 Karnataka Legislative Assembly election. He polled 72,297 votes and defeated his nearest rival, Baburao Chinchansur of Indian National Congress by 2,579 votes.
