= Naganagouda Kandkur =

Indian politician

Member of the Karnataka Legislative Assembly
- In office 2018–2023
- Preceded by: Baburao Chinchansur
- Succeeded by: Sharanagouda Kandakur
- Constituency: Gurmitkal

Personal details
- Party: Janata Dal (Secular)

Naganagouda Kandkur (c. 1945 – 28 January 2024) was an Indian politician from Karnataka who served as a Member of the Legislative Assembly (MLA) from the Gurmitkal Assembly constituency in Yadgir district from 2018 to 2023. He was a member of the Janata Dal (Secular) and represented the constituency multiple times during his political career.

== Early life ==
Naganagouda Kandkur was born around 1945 in Kandkur village, Gurmitkal taluk, Yadgir district, Karnataka. He came from a family involved in politics and later became a well-known figure in the area.

== Political career ==
Kandkur spent several decades in politics, mostly with the Janata Dal (Secular). He won the Gurmitkal Assembly seat multiple times. He also held administrative jobs, including Chairman of the Karnataka Slum Development Board and a role with the Karnataka Slum Clearance Board. During the COVID-19 pandemic, he caught the virus.

== Elections ==
=== 2018 Karnataka Legislative Assembly Election ===
In 2018, Kandkur won the Gurmitkal seat with 79,627 votes, beating his closest rival by 24,480 votes. His main opponents were Saibanna Borbanda from BJP and Baburao Chinchansur from Congress.

This victory ended Congress's 51-year hold on the constituency. He served from 16 May 2018 to 2023. During his time as MLA, he attended 93.4% of assembly sessions, which was better than the state average of 82.5%. His background was in social work and agriculture.

=== 2013 election ===
In 2013, Kandkur lost the Gurmitkal seat to Baburao Chinchanasoor from Congress.

== Death ==
Naganagouda Kandkur died in 2024.
