= Channareddy Patil Tunnur =

Indian politician (born 1948)

Channareddy Patil Tunnur (born 26 April 1948) is an Indian politician from Karnataka. He is an MLA from Yadgir Assembly constituency in Yadgir district. He won the 2023 Karnataka Legislative Assembly election representing Indian National Congress.

== Early life and education ==
Patil was born in Yadgir to Mallareddeppa Gouda. He married Bhimavathi and they have three sons and a daughter. He did graduation in science but discontinued in the final year of his B.Sc. in 1970. He is a former director of Agricultural Produce Marketing Committee. He also served as member of Zilla Panchayat of Gulbarga during 1986. He was also former chairman of Zilla Panchayat Works Committee in Gulbarga, before Yadgir became a district.

== Career ==
Patil won as an MLA for the first time from Yadgir Assembly constituency representing Indian National Congress in the 2023 Karnataka Legislative Assembly election. He polled 53,802 votes and defeated his nearest rival, Venkatreddy Mudnal of Bharatiya Janata Party, by a narrow margin of 3, 673 votes.
