= Valmiki Nayak =

Indian politician (1951–2021)

Member of Karnataka Legislative Assembly
- In office 2009–2013
- Preceded by: Mallikarjun Kharge
- Succeeded by: Priyank M. Kharge
- Constituency: Chittapur

Personal details
- Born: 5 June 1951 Wadi, Hyderabad State, India
- Died: 19 March 2021 (aged 69) Wadi, Karnataka, India
- Party: Bharatiya Janata Party
- Spouse: Sona Bai
- Children: Two sons and four daughters
- Education: Pre University Course
- Occupation: Labourer

Valmiki Nayak (5 June 1951 – 19 March 2021) was an Indian politician and a former member of Karnataka Legislative Assembly from Chittapur constituency.

== Personal life ==
Valmiki Nayak worked at ACC Limited, an Indian cement manufacturer before entering politics. He studied up to Pre University Course. Valmiki Nayak was married to Sona Bai and they have two sons and four daughters together.

== Political life ==
He began his political career by contesting the Mandal panchayat elections at Wadi in 1986-87. He contested 1999 Karnataka Legislative Assembly elections from Shahabad against Baburao Chavhan and lost by a margin of 7866 votes. Later he was defeated by Mallikarjun Kharge from Chittapur in 2008 Karnataka Legislative Assembly elections. Valmiki Nayak was victorious against Priyank M. Kharge (son of Mallikarjun Kharge) in 2009 by-election from Chittapur which was a seat vacated by Mallikarjun Kharge after he was elected to 15th Lok Sabha as a Member of Parliament representing Gulbarga Lok Sabha constituency. However he lost to Priyank M. Kharge in 2013 and 2018.

== Death ==
He developed sudden chest pain during morning walk and was rushed to Jayadeva Institute of Cardiovascular Sciences and Research in Gulbarga, where he was declared dead due to cardiac arrest. He was survived by wife, two sons and four daughters. His body was later shifted to his native place i.e., Wadi where it was to be kept for public viewing.
