= Gurmitkal Assembly constituency =

Assembly constituency in Karnataka, India

Coordinates: 16.86°N 77.39°E

Gurmitkal
- Constituency No. 39 for the Karnataka Legislative Assembly

Constituency details
- Country: India
- Region: South India
- State: Karnataka
- District: Yadgir
- Lok Sabha constituency: Gulbarga
- Established: 1962
- Total electors: 248,181
- Reservation: None

Member of Legislative Assembly
- 16th Karnataka Legislative Assembly
- Incumbent Sharanagouda Kandakur
- Party: JD(S)
- Alliance: NDA
- Preceded by: Naganagouda Kandkur

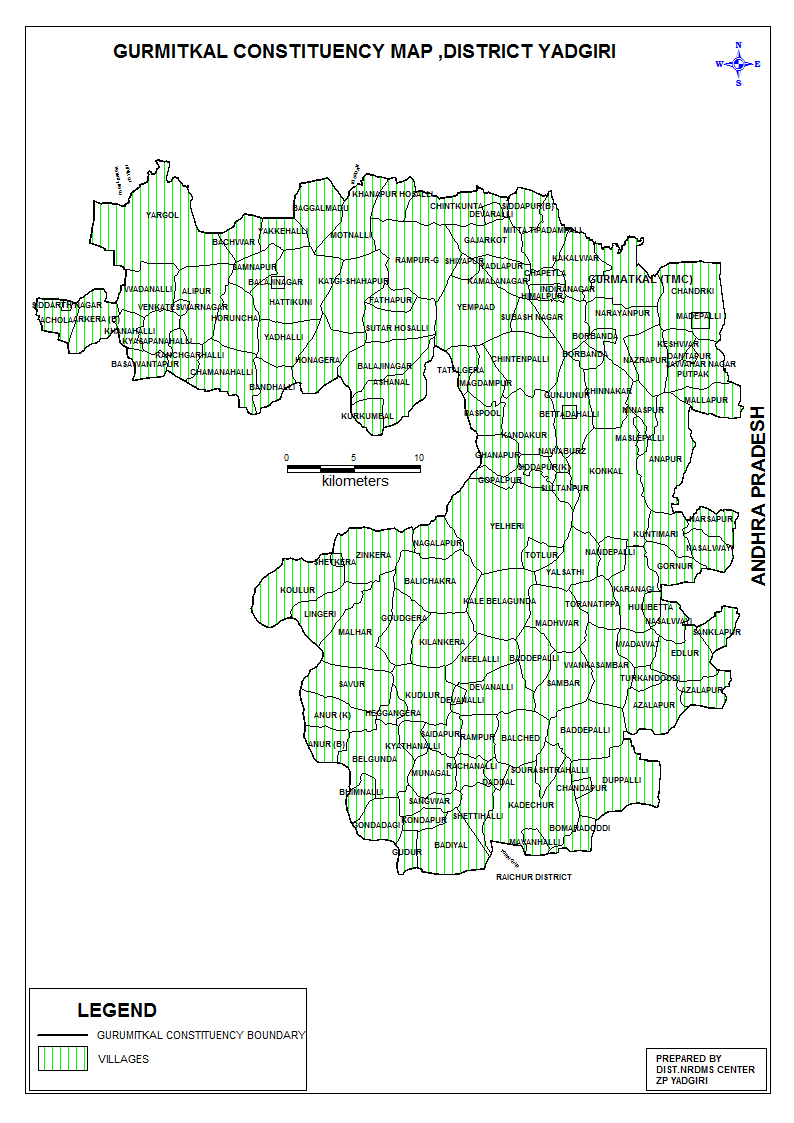

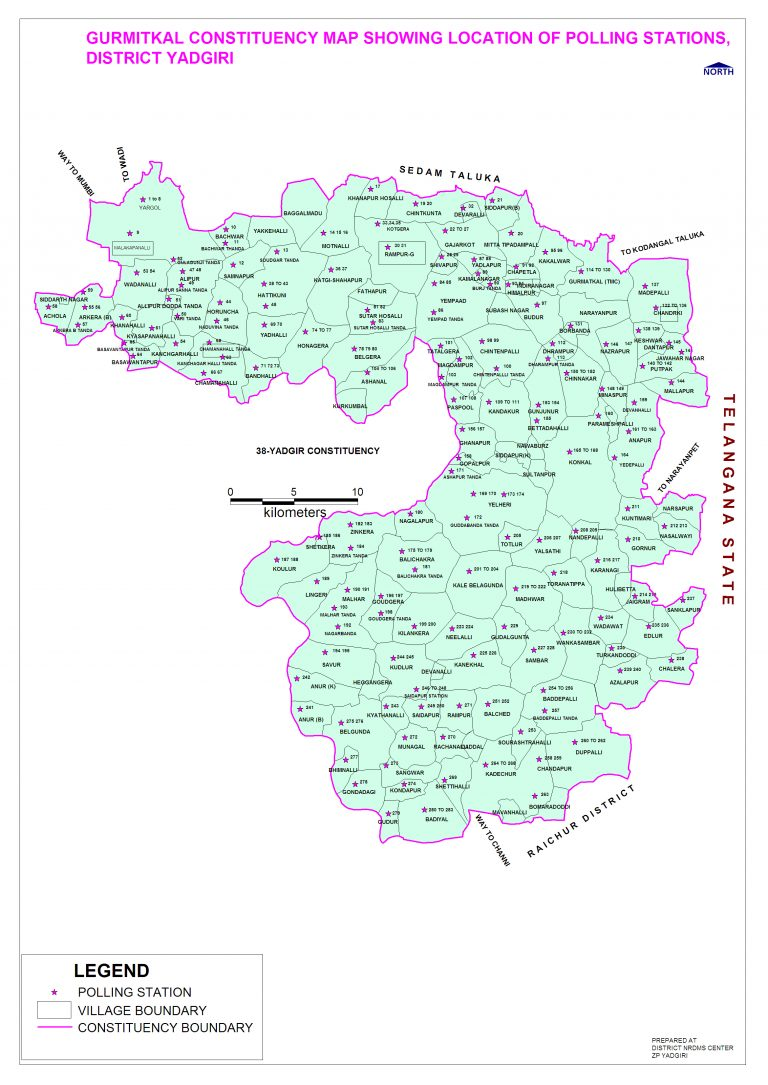

Gurmitkal Assembly constituency is one of 224 assembly constituencies for the Karnataka Legislative Assembly in the Indian state of Karnataka. It is part of Gulbarga Lok Sabha constituency.

Sharanagouda Kandakur of Janata Dal (Secular) is the current MLA from Gurmitkal.

== Members of the Legislative Assembly ==
Election	Member	Party
1962	Vidyadhar Guruji Sayanna	Swatantra Party
1967	N. Venkappa	Indian National Congress
1972	Mallikarjun Kharge	Indian National Congress
1978	Mallikarjun Kharge	Indian National Congress
1983	Mallikarjun Kharge	Indian National Congress
1985	Mallikarjun Kharge	Indian National Congress
1989	Mallikarjun Kharge	Indian National Congress
1994	Mallikarjun Kharge	Indian National Congress
1999	Mallikarjun Kharge	Indian National Congress
2004	Mallikarjun Kharge	Indian National Congress
2008	Baburao Chinchansur	Indian National Congress
2013	Baburao Chinchansur	Indian National Congress
2018	Naganagouda Kandkur	Janata Dal
2023	Sharanagouda Kandakur	Janata Dal

== Election results ==
=== Assembly Election 2023 ===
2023 Karnataka Legislative Assembly election : Gurmitkal
Party	Candidate	Votes	%	±%
JD(S)	Sharanagouda Kandakur	72,297	44.54%	▼7.86
INC	Baburao Chinchansur	69,718	42.95%	▲6.66
BJP	Anpur Lalita Moulali	14,571	8.98%	▲3.06
BSP	K. B. Vasu	2,590	1.60%	New
NOTA	None of the above	1,416	0.87%	▼0.72
Kranti Sabha	S. Nijalingappa Doddasambra	1,070	0.66%	New
Margin of victory		2,579	1.59%	▼14.52
Turnout		162,435	65.45%	▲3.45
Total valid votes		162,330		
Registered electors		248,181		▲1.21
JD(S) hold		Swing	▼7.86	

=== Assembly Election 2018 ===
2018 Karnataka Legislative Assembly election : Gurmitkal
Party	Candidate	Votes	%	±%
JD(S)	Naganagouda Kandkur	79,627	52.40%	▲24.59
INC	Baburao Chinchansur	55,147	36.29%	▲7.15
BJP	Sayibanna	8,995	5.92%	▼2.00
NOTA	None of the above	2,418	1.59%	New
Indian New Congress Party	Chandrashekar. T. Dasankeri	1,392	0.92%	New
SUCI(C)	K. Somashekar	1,272	0.84%	New
Margin of victory		24,480	16.11%	▲14.78
Turnout		152,037	62.00%	▼1.55
Total valid votes		151,974		
Registered electors		245,215		▲20.77
JD(S) gain from INC		Swing	▲23.26	

=== Assembly Election 2013 ===
2013 Karnataka Legislative Assembly election : Gurmitkal
Party	Candidate	Votes	%	±%
INC	Baburao Chinchansur	36,051	29.14%	▼6.70
JD(S)	Naganagouda Kandkur	34,401	27.81%	▲1.21
KJP	Venkatareddy Vishwanathreddy Mudnal	32,362	26.16%	New
BJP	Girish Mattennavar	9,795	7.92%	▼1.44
Independent	Shaik Mehaboob	4,432	3.58%	New
BSRCP	Babu Chavhan	1,860	1.50%	New
SP	Sathyanarayana Yadav	1,277	1.03%	New
BSP	Shivalingappa Kinnura	1,211	0.98%	▼2.02
Independent	Anilkumar	1,120	0.91%	New
Margin of victory		1,650	1.33%	▼7.91
Turnout		129,047	63.55%	▲7.16
Total valid votes		123,716		
Registered electors		203,049		▲14.84
INC hold		Swing	▼6.70	

=== Assembly Election 2008 ===
2008 Karnataka Legislative Assembly election : Gurmitkal
Party	Candidate	Votes	%	±%
INC	Baburao Chinchansur	35,721	35.84%	▼10.15
JD(S)	Naganagouda Kandkur	26,513	26.60%	▲3.66
Independent	Venkatreddy Mudnal	21,500	21.57%	New
BJP	Vithal Heroor	9,327	9.36%	▼11.43
BSP	Basavaraj Jinikeri	2,995	3.00%	▼0.88
Independent	Channayya	2,079	2.09%	New
Independent	Virupksh Reddy	1,546	1.55%	New
Margin of victory		9,208	9.24%	▼13.81
Turnout		99,709	56.39%	▲2.29
Total valid votes		99,681		
Registered electors		176,818		▲18.70
INC hold		Swing	▼10.15	

=== Assembly Election 2004 ===
2004 Karnataka Legislative Assembly election : Gurmitkal
Party	Candidate	Votes	%	±%
INC	Mallikarjun Kharge	37,006	45.99%	▼30.77
JD(S)	Akaashi Basavaraj	18,459	22.94%	▲13.11
BJP	Shaamarao Pyati	16,732	20.79%	New
JP	Mangala B. Kurlli	3,405	4.23%	New
BSP	Devendranath K. Naad	3,124	3.88%	▲2.15
Kannada Nadu Party	Gopal B. Dasankeri	1,738	2.16%	New
Margin of victory		18,547	23.05%	▼43.23
Turnout		80,593	54.10%	▼2.11
Total valid votes		80,464		
Registered electors		148,958		▲11.71
INC hold		Swing	▼30.77	

=== Assembly Election 1999 ===
1999 Karnataka Legislative Assembly election : Gurmitkal
Party	Candidate	Votes	%	±%
INC	Mallikarjun Kharge	54,569	76.76%	▲18.00
JD(U)	Ashok Guruji	7,445	10.47%	New
JD(S)	Timmanna Hedgimadri	6,986	9.83%	New
BSP	Shantaraj Motanalli	1,231	1.73%	New
Independent	A. Buggayya	864	1.22%	New
Margin of victory		47,124	66.28%	▲39.60
Turnout		74,944	56.21%	▼6.68
Total valid votes		71,095		
Rejected ballots		3,837	5.12%	▲1.63
Registered electors		133,339		▲11.64
INC hold		Swing	▲18.00	

=== Assembly Election 1994 ===
1994 Karnataka Legislative Assembly election : Gurmitkal
Party	Candidate	Votes	%	±%
INC	Mallikarjun Kharge	42,588	58.76%	▼5.47
JD	K. B. Shanappa	23,252	32.08%	▲0.23
INC	Amareshwar Rathod	6,635	9.15%	New
Margin of victory		19,336	26.68%	▼5.70
Turnout		75,108	62.89%	▲4.46
Total valid votes		72,475		
Rejected ballots		2,624	3.49%	▼1.73
Registered electors		119,435		▲7.26
INC hold		Swing	▼5.47	

=== Assembly Election 1989 ===
1989 Karnataka Legislative Assembly election : Gurmitkal
Party	Candidate	Votes	%	±%
INC	Mallikarjun Kharge	39,608	64.23%	▼1.77
JD	Arvind Guruji	19,639	31.85%	New
Kranti Sabha	Basappa	1,778	2.88%	New
Independent	Shankerappa Polappa	639	1.04%	New
Margin of victory		19,969	32.38%	▼3.32
Turnout		65,059	58.43%	▲0.71
Total valid votes		61,664		
Rejected ballots		3,395	5.22%	▲2.27
Registered electors		111,349		▲26.01
INC hold		Swing	▼1.77	

=== Assembly Election 1985 ===
1985 Karnataka Legislative Assembly election : Gurmitkal
Party	Candidate	Votes	%	±%
INC	Mallikarjun Kharge	32,669	66.00%	▼1.65
JP	B. S. Gajanana	14,996	30.30%	▼2.05
LKD	Hanamantha	1,834	3.71%	New
Margin of victory		17,673	35.70%	▲0.39
Turnout		51,002	57.72%	▼0.80
Total valid votes		49,499		
Rejected ballots		1,503	2.95%	▼1.42
Registered electors		88,365		▲8.16
INC hold		Swing	▼1.65	

=== Assembly Election 1983 ===
1983 Karnataka Legislative Assembly election : Gurmitkal
Party	Candidate	Votes	%	±%
INC	Mallikarjun Kharge	30,933	67.65%	▲64.39
JP	B. S. Gajanana	14,790	32.35%	▲2.87
Margin of victory		16,143	35.31%	▼0.20
Turnout		47,810	58.52%	▼4.76
Total valid votes		45,723		
Rejected ballots		2,087	4.37%	▲0.37
Registered electors		81,695		▲6.16
INC gain from INC(I)		Swing	▲2.66	

=== Assembly Election 1978 ===
1978 Karnataka Legislative Assembly election : Gurmitkal
Party	Candidate	Votes	%	±%
INC(I)	Mallikarjun Kharge	30,380	64.99%	New
JP	G. Mahadevappa Tamanna	13,781	29.48%	New
INC	Mallanna Ramanna	1,522	3.26%	▼59.42
Independent	Moortheppa Hanumanthappa	603	1.29%	New
Independent	Khande Rao Narsing Rao	458	0.98%	New
Margin of victory		16,599	35.51%	▲0.28
Turnout		48,694	63.28%	▲25.41
Total valid votes		46,744		
Rejected ballots		1,950	4.00%	▲4.00
Registered electors		76,953		▲3.75
INC(I) gain from INC		Swing	▲2.31	

=== Assembly Election 1972 ===
1972 Mysore State Legislative Assembly election : Gurmitkal
Party	Candidate	Votes	%	±%
INC	Mallikarjun Kharge	16,796	62.68%	▲10.98
Independent	Murtheppa	7,356	27.45%	New
Independent	Narsappa	1,622	6.05%	New
Independent	Ramappa	1,023	3.82%	New
Margin of victory		9,440	35.23%	▲31.84
Turnout		28,087	37.87%	▼3.55
Total valid votes		26,797		
Registered electors		74,170		▲6.49
INC hold		Swing	▲10.98	

=== Assembly Election 1967 ===
1967 Mysore State Legislative Assembly election : Gurmitkal
Party	Candidate	Votes	%	±%
INC	N. Venkappa	14,127	51.70%	▲18.88
SWA	S. Bhimappa	13,200	48.30%	▼18.88
Margin of victory		927	3.39%	▼30.96
Turnout		28,849	41.42%	▼9.57
Total valid votes		27,327		
Registered electors		69,649		▲16.04
INC gain from SWA		Swing	▼15.48	

=== Assembly Election 1962 ===
1962 Mysore State Legislative Assembly election : Gurmitkal
Party	Candidate	Votes	%	±%
SWA	Vidyadhar Guruji Sayanna	19,378	67.18%	New
INC	Mallappa Lingappa Kollur	9,469	32.82%	New
Margin of victory		9,909	34.35%	
Turnout		30,601	50.99%	
Total valid votes		28,847		
Registered electors		60,019		
SWA win (new seat)				

== See also ==
- Yadgir (Karnataka Assembly constituency)
- Yadgir (Lok Sabha constituency)
- List of constituencies of the Karnataka Legislative Assembly
