= Vidyadhar Guruji Sayanna =

Indian politician, freedom fighter and Gandhian

Member of Mysore Legislative Assembly
- In office 1962–1967
- Preceded by: Seat established
- Succeeded by: N. Yenkappa
- Constituency: Gurmitkal

Chairman, Hindi Prachar Sabha

Personal details
- Born: 30 December 1914
- Died: 29 July 2017 (aged 102) Kalaburagi Government hospital, Kalaburagi, Karnataka
- Party: Janata Party
- Other political affiliations: Swatantra party
- Spouse: Savitadevi
- Children: 3 Sons and 1 Daughter
- Parent: Sayanna (Father)

Vidyadhar Guruji Sayanna was an Indian politician, freedom fighter and Gandhian. He was a Member of Mysore Legislative Assembly (currently Karnataka Legislative Assembly) from Gurmitkal constituency.

== Personal life ==
Vidyadhar Guruji Sayanna was married to Savitadevi and the couple had four children which includes three sons, and one daughter.

== Positions held ==
- Member of Mysore Legislative Assembly (Third Assembly 1962–1967).
- Chairman of Hindi Prachar Sabha (for a period)

== Election results ==
=== 1962 ===
Mysore Legislative Assembly election, Gurmitkal Constituency
Year	Constituency	Candidate	Party	Votes	Result
1962	Shahapur (Vidhana Sabha constituency) A.C.No 15	Vidyadhar Guruji Sayanna	Swatantra Party	19,378	Won
1962	Shahapur (Vidhana Sabha constituency) A.C.No 15	Malappa Lingappa Kollur	Indian National Congress	9,469	
MARGIN : 9909 (34.35% of Total Valid Votes)

=== 1984 ===
Polling Date: 24-12-1984

Polling Station: Number: 1,127

Average Electors per Polling Station: 681

8th Lok Sabha General Election - 1984, Gulbarga Constituency
Year	Constituency	Candidate	Party	Votes	Result
1984	Gulbarga (Lok Sabha constituency)	Veerendra Patil	Indian National Congress	235,751	Won
1984	Gulbarga (Lok Sabha constituency)	Vidyadhar Guruji Sayanna	Janata Party	140,261	
MARGIN : 95,490 (23.80% of Total Valid Votes)
