= Priyank Kharge =

Indian politician (born 1978)

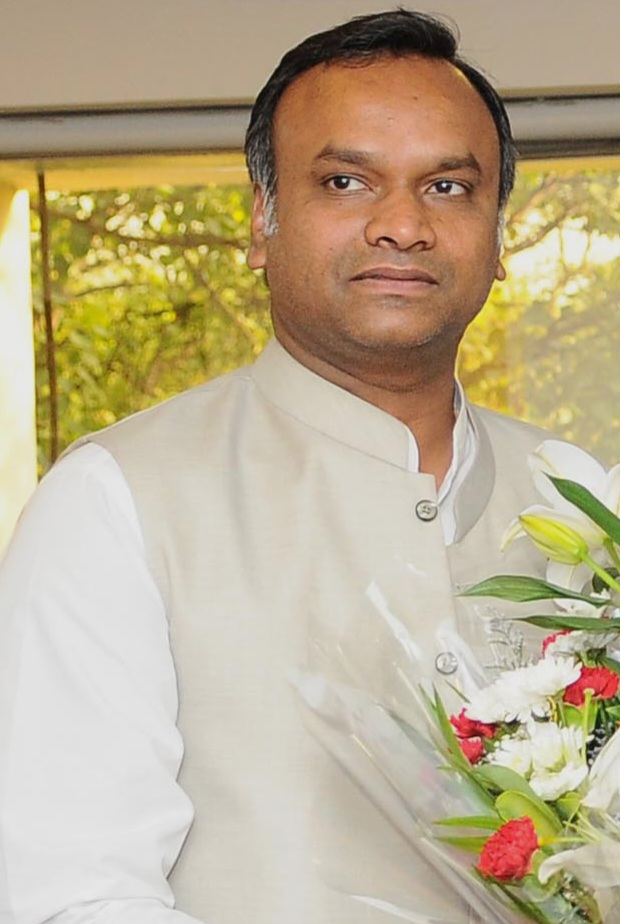
- Priyank Kharge in 2017

Cabinet Minister Government of Karnataka
- Incumbent
- Assumed office 03 June 2026
- Cabinet: Shivakumar ministry
- Chief minister: D. K. Shivakumar
- Portfolios: Home; Information Technology & Biotechnology; E-Governance
- Preceded by: G. Parameshwara (Home)
- In office 20 May 2023 – 29 May 2026
- Governor: Thawarchand Gehlot
- Cabinet: Siddaramaiah II
- Chief Minister: Siddaramaiah
- Portfolio(s): Rural Development; Panchayati Raj; Information Technology & Biotechnology
- Preceded by: Basavaraj Bommai (Rural Development & Panchayati Raj); C. N. Ashwath Narayan (IT & BT)
- Succeeded by: Eshwara Khandre (Rural Development & Panchayati Raj)
- In office 8 June 2018 – 23 July 2019
- Governor: Vajubhai Vala
- Cabinet: Kumaraswamy II
- Chief Minister: H. D. Kumaraswamy
- Ministry: Social Welfare
- Preceded by: H. Anjaneya
- Succeeded by: Govind Karjol

Member of Karnataka Legislative Assembly
- Incumbent
- Assumed office 2013
- Preceded by: Valmiki Nayak
- Constituency: Chittapur

Minister of State of IT & BT and Science & Technology Government of Karnataka
- In office 2016–2018

Personal details
- Born: 22 November 1978 (age 47) Bangalore, Karnataka
- Party: Indian National Congress
- Spouse: Shruthi P. Kharge
- Parent(s): Mallikarjun Kharge (father); Radhabai Kharge (mother)
- Occupation: Politician

Priyank Mallikarjun Kharge (born 22 November 1978) is an Indian politician belonging to the Indian National Congress (INC) and a 3rd time Minister in the Government of Karnataka. He is serving as Minister for Home Affairs, Information Technology, Biotechnology, and E-Governance since June 2026. He is a three-time Member of the Legislative Assembly (MLA) from the Chittapur constituency in Kalaburagi district.

He is the son of Mallikarjun Kharge, the national president of the Indian National Congress and Leader of the Opposition in the Rajya Sabha.

Priyank Kharge has emerged as an unusually assertive, ideologically distinct minister in India's political landscape. Mr. Priyank has directly challenged the RSS's legal registration, funding, and permit procedures, a stance some within Congress link to Rahul Gandhi's broader national positioning.

== Political career ==
=== Student and Youth Politics (1998–2014) ===
- 1998: Entered politics as an activist of the National Students' Union of India (NSUI).
- 1999: Elected NSUI College General Secretary; formally joined the Indian National Congress.
- 2001–2005: Served as NSUI State General Secretary.
- 2005–2007: Secretary, Karnataka Pradesh Youth Congress.
- 2007–2011: General Secretary, Karnataka Pradesh Youth Congress.
- 2009: Contested the Chittapur assembly by-election and lost to Valmiki Nayak of the Bharatiya Janata Party (BJP).
- 2011–2014: Vice-President, Karnataka Pradesh Youth Congress.

=== First Term as MLA and Minister of IT/BT and Tourism (2013–2018) ===
Priyank Kharge was elected to the Karnataka Legislative Assembly from Chittapur for the first time in 2013. In June 2016, at age 38, he was sworn in as a minister in Chief Minister Siddaramaiah's cabinet, holding the Information Technology, Biotechnology and Tourism portfolio (2016–18) — making him one of the youngest ministers in the state at the time. During this term he introduced the Startup Booster Kit and launched the Bengaluru Tech Summit in 2017. Bengaluru Tech Summit is now Asia's largest technology event, and he continues to lead it as the state's IT/BT minister. Its 28th edition (November 18–20, 2025) was themed "Futurise," drawing over 60 countries, 15,000+ delegates, 500+ speakers, and 1,000+ exhibitors across 10 tracks spanning AI, deep tech, semiconductors, biotech, fintech, defence, and spacetech. He introduced a new flagship component this year, the Future Makers Conclave, aimed at connecting roughly 10,000–20,000 founders, investors, and innovators with capital, mentorship, and business opportunities. He used the summit stage to reaffirm Karnataka's position as India's top GCC (Global Capability Centre) destination — citing 875+ GCCs, a 1.2 million-strong tech workforce, and 18,000+ startups in the state — and to launch the GCC Policy 2025.

=== Second Term as MLA and Minister in Coalition Government (2018–2023) ===
Priyank Kharge won re-election from Chittapur in 2018. In the Congress–JD(S) coalition government led by H. D. Kumaraswamy, he served as Cabinet Minister for Social Welfare. As Social Welfare minister he launched a series of first-of-their-kind schemes to economically empower SC/ST communities, including Airavata (grants for taxi partnerships), Prabuddha (funding for foreign postgrad/PhD education), and Samruddhi and Unnati (seed capital for retail franchisees and tech startups).

=== Third Term MLA and Minister of IT/BT, Rural Development (2023–2026) ===
Priyank Kharge won a third term from Chittapur in 2023. Following the Congress victory in the state, he was given the Information Technology and Biotechnology portfolio along with Rural Development and Panchayat Raj.

On the IT/BT side, Priyank Kharge's tenure saw major manufacturing investment announcements in Karnataka. In August 2023, Kaynes Technology signed an MoU with the state government for a ₹3,750 crore outsourced semiconductor assembly, testing and PCB manufacturing facility at Kochanahalli, near Mysuru, expected to create around 3,200 jobs. Separately, Foxconn's iPhone assembly facility in Devanahalli, representing an investment of around ₹20,000 crore, had created approximately 30,000 jobs within eight months of commencing operations as of December 2025, with the state government targeting a workforce of 50,000 by 2026; the plant accounts for more than 80% of iPhones assembled in India for export. Foxconn separately signed a Letter of Intent in 2023 for two additional projects worth around ₹5,000 crore covering phone-enclosure manufacturing and semiconductor equipment manufacturing, projected to create about 13,000 jobs. His IT/BT tenure also included the GCC Policy 2025 and the "Deep Tech Decade" fund, and Bengaluru rose to 14th globally in startup ecosystem rankings during this period.

According to figures published by the Karnataka RDPR department, the state was ranked first nationally for panchayat decentralization under his tenure, with over 5,700 village libraries digitized, gram panchayat tax collection hitting a record ₹1,273 crore, and major road and water schemes ("Pragati Patha," "Kalyana Patha," Jal Jeevan Mission) connecting nearly 86 lakh rural households. (Note: RDPR figures are sourced to the Karnataka RDPR department's own published work reports, not independent journalism.) He also expanded citizen-service delivery through Bapuji Seva Kendras and the Panchamitra grievance portal, built thousands of NREGA-linked childcare centres, and raised the NREGA daily wage to ₹370.

=== Home Minister Under D. K. Shivakumar (2026–present) ===
Following Siddaramaiah's resignation as Chief Minister in May 2026, Priyank Kharge was widely reported as the front-runner for the Home Minister post in the incoming cabinet led by D. K. Shivakumar. He was sworn in as a cabinet minister on 3 June 2026 and, two days later, was allocated the Home portfolio, while retaining Information Technology, Biotechnology and E-Governance.

Since taking over Home Affairs, reported priorities have included modernising police digital infrastructure (including the 1930 Cyber Helpline and the Namma 112 emergency response system), and coordinating a state anti-narcotics framework combining enforcement, forensics and rehabilitation.

== Electoral Performance ==
Year	Constituency	Result
2009 (by-election)	Chittapur	Lost to Valmiki Nayak (BJP)
2013	Chittapur	Won
2018	Chittapur	Won
2023	Chittapur	Won

== Social media ==
Priyank Kharge maintains an active presence on social media, where he regularly comments on policy matters and political developments. His verified accounts include X (formerly Twitter) and Facebook.

== Personal life ==
Priyank Kharge is married to Shruti Kharge. He identifies as a follower of B. R. Ambedkar and a Buddhist.
