= Chittapur Assembly constituency =

Constituency of the Karnataka legislative assembly in India

Coordinates: 17.12°N 77.09°E

Chittapur
- Constituency No. 40 for the Karnataka Legislative Assembly

Constituency details
- Country: India
- Region: South India
- State: Karnataka
- District: Kalaburagi
- Lok Sabha constituency: Gulbarga
- Established: 1951
- Total electors: 235,755
- Reservation: SC

Member of Legislative Assembly
- 16th Karnataka Legislative Assembly
- Incumbent Priyank M. Kharge
- Party: Indian National Congress
- Elected year: 2023
- Preceded by: Valmiki Nayak

Chittapur Assembly constituency is one of the 224 constituencies in the Karnataka Legislative Assembly of Karnataka, a southern state of India. Chittapur is also part of Gulbarga Lok Sabha constituency.

== Members of the Legislative Assembly ==
Election	Member	Party
1952	Rudrappa	Indian National Congress
1957	Vijaya Devi Raghavender Rao	Indian National Congress
1962	Vijaya Devi Raghavender Rao	Indian National Congress
1967	R. Nagappa	Indian National Congress
1972	Vijay Desai	Indian National Congress
1978	Prabhakar. R. Telkar	Indian National Congress
1983	Vishawanath Hebbal Patil	Janata Party
1985	Vishawanath Hebbal Patil	Janata Party
1989	Baburao Chinchansur	Indian National Congress
1994	Baburao Chinchansur	Indian National Congress
1999	Baburao Chinchansur	Indian National Congress
2004	Vishawanath Hebbal Patil	Janata Dal
2008	Mallikarjun Kharge	Indian National Congress
2009^ (Note: Resigned on 29/05/2009)	Valmiki Nayak	Bharatiya Janata Party
2013	Priyank Kharge	Indian National Congress
2018	Priyank Kharge	Indian National Congress
2023	Priyank Kharge	Indian National Congress

== Election results ==
=== Assembly Election 2023 ===
2023 Karnataka Legislative Assembly election : Chittapur
Party	Candidate	Votes	%	±%
INC	Priyank Kharge	81,323	53.08%	▲3.43
BJP	Manikanta Rathod	67,683	44.18%	▼2.35
AAP	Jagadish S. Sagar	962	0.63%	New
NOTA	None of the above	816	0.53%	▼0.22
Margin of victory		13,640	8.90%	▲5.77
Turnout		153,242	65.00%	▲4.46
Total valid votes		153,195		
Registered electors		235,755		▲1.65
INC hold		Swing	▲3.43	

=== Assembly Election 2018 ===
2018 Karnataka Legislative Assembly election : Chittapur
Party	Candidate	Votes	%	±%
INC	Priyank Kharge	69,700	49.65%	▼1.37
BJP	Valmiki Nayak	65,307	46.53%	▲18.45
BSP	V. K. Devaraja	1,218	0.87%	▼0.09
AIMEP	Raju Hadnoor	1,136	0.81%	New
NOTA	None of the above	1,052	0.75%	New
Margin of victory		4,393	3.13%	▼19.81
Turnout		140,397	60.54%	▼4.57
Total valid votes		140,369		
Registered electors		231,920		▲21.78
INC hold		Swing	▼1.37	

=== Assembly Election 2013 ===
2013 Karnataka Legislative Assembly election : Chittapur
Party	Candidate	Votes	%	±%
INC	Priyank Kharge	69,379	51.02%	▲7.02
BJP	Valmiki Nayak	38,188	28.08%	▼17.43
KJP	Gurunath	9,596	7.06%	New
Independent	Raju Mukkanna Wadi	1,546	1.14%	New
BSP	Ayyappa Ramateerth	1,310	0.96%	▼0.32
WPOI	Dhanalaxmi Rathod	1,103	0.81%	New
Independent	Mahesh Kashi	982	0.72%	New
JD(S)	Tippanna Odeyaraj	955	0.70%	▼3.91
Margin of victory		31,191	22.94%	▲21.43
Turnout		124,004	65.11%	▲8.18
Total valid votes		135,976		
Registered electors		190,446		▲2.03
INC gain from BJP		Swing	▲5.51	

=== Assembly By-election 2009 ===
2009 Karnataka Legislative Assembly by-election : Chittapur
Party	Candidate	Votes	%	±%
BJP	Valmiki Nayak	48,365	45.51%	▲11.62
INC	Priyank Kharge	46,759	44.00%	▼8.13
JD(S)	Basavaraj Bennur	4,904	4.61%	▼2.27
BPP	Shankar Jadhav	1,410	1.33%	New
BSP	Ayyappa Ramateerth	1,356	1.28%	▼0.93
Independent	S. R. Ghattargi	1,286	1.21%	New
Independent	Devindra S/o Hanmanth	977	0.92%	New
Margin of victory		1,606	1.51%	▼16.73
Turnout		106,276	56.93%	▲4.89
Total valid votes		106,276		
Registered electors		186,663		▲1.56
BJP gain from INC		Swing	▼6.62	

=== Assembly Election 2008 ===
2008 Karnataka Legislative Assembly election : Chittapur
Party	Candidate	Votes	%	±%
INC	Mallikarjun Kharge	49,837	52.13%	▲24.06
BJP	Valmiki Nayak	32,395	33.89%	▲20.09
JD(S)	Basavaraj Bennur	6,574	6.88%	▼41.08
Independent	Tippanna Odeyaraj	2,419	2.53%	New
BSP	Raju Mukkanna Wadi	2,112	2.21%	▼0.57
JD(U)	Savita. H. Rathod	1,254	1.31%	New
LJP	Husenappa Hulagappa Kalli Lingasur	1,009	1.06%	New
Margin of victory		17,442	18.24%	▼1.65
Turnout		95,652	52.04%	▼6.13
Total valid votes		95,600		
Registered electors		183,801		▲25.38
INC gain from JD(S)		Swing	▲4.17	

=== Assembly Election 2004 ===
2004 Karnataka Legislative Assembly election : Chittapur
Party	Candidate	Votes	%	±%
JD(S)	Vishawanath Hebbal Patil	40,871	47.96%	▲47.13
INC	Baburao Chinchansur	23,921	28.07%	▼24.58
BJP	Dr. Prabhuraj Kanta	11,760	13.80%	New
Kannada Nadu Party	Patil. B. G	2,845	3.34%	New
BSP	Md. Maqbool Khan Madrkhan	2,373	2.78%	New
JP	Md. Masiuddin Klyani	2,014	2.36%	New
SP	Khaummuddin Bidri	771	0.90%	▲0.06
AIFB	Nagenderappa Gundi Malkhed	657	0.77%	New
Margin of victory		16,950	19.89%	▲9.27
Turnout		85,276	58.17%	▼5.19
Total valid votes		85,212		
Registered electors		146,590		▲16.44
JD(S) gain from INC		Swing	▼4.69	

=== Assembly Election 1999 ===
1999 Karnataka Legislative Assembly election : Chittapur
Party	Candidate	Votes	%	±%
INC	Baburao Chinchansur	39,919	52.65%	▲16.33
JD(U)	Vishawanath Hebbal Patil	31,863	42.02%	New
Independent	Vishwanath Malakappa	1,883	2.48%	New
SP	Mohammed Ismail Khasim Sab	638	0.84%	New
JD(S)	Anna Rao Sannurkar	633	0.83%	New
Independent	Annappa Makikappa Nagoor	550	0.73%	New
Margin of victory		8,056	10.62%	▲9.44
Turnout		79,768	63.36%	▲2.98
Total valid votes		75,825		
Rejected ballots		3,925	4.92%	▲2.16
Registered electors		125,895		▲5.86
INC hold		Swing	▲16.33	

=== Assembly Election 1994 ===
1994 Karnataka Legislative Assembly election : Chittapur
Party	Candidate	Votes	%	±%
INC	Baburao Chinchansur	25,355	36.32%	▼14.06
Independent	Vishawanath Hebbal Patil	24,529	35.14%	New
INC	Karsiddappa	5,165	7.40%	New
BJP	Sivalingappa Patil Bhagodi	4,272	6.12%	▲5.29
JD	Revansiddappa Bhagodi	2,287	3.28%	▼10.81
BSP	Abdul Rasheed Phylvan	2,032	2.91%	New
Independent	Tippusing	1,079	1.55%	New
Independent	Bandeppa Devantgi	1,066	1.53%	New
Independent	Anand. K. Malkar	872	1.25%	New
Margin of victory		826	1.18%	▼16.94
Turnout		71,812	60.38%	▲0.19
Total valid votes		69,811		
Rejected ballots		1,980	2.76%	▼3.69
Registered electors		118,926		▲9.59
INC hold		Swing	▼14.06	

=== Assembly Election 1989 ===
1989 Karnataka Legislative Assembly election : Chittapur
Party	Candidate	Votes	%	±%
INC	Baburao Chinchansur	30,786	50.38%	▲8.24
JP	Vishawanath Hebbal Patil	19,717	32.27%	New
JD	Revansiddappa Bhagodi	8,607	14.09%	New
Independent	Mallikarjun	976	1.60%	New
Kranti Sabha	Baswareddy Karreddy	510	0.83%	New
BJP	T. K. Kale Kashinathrao	506	0.83%	▼0.89
Margin of victory		11,069	18.12%	▲10.74
Turnout		65,317	60.19%	▲5.16
Total valid votes		61,102		
Rejected ballots		4,215	6.45%	▲3.44
Registered electors		108,523		▲24.52
INC gain from JP		Swing	▲0.86	

=== Assembly Election 1985 ===
1985 Karnataka Legislative Assembly election : Chittapur
Party	Candidate	Votes	%	±%
JP	Vishawanath Hebbal Patil	23,038	49.52%	▼6.58
INC	Hanumanthraya Allur	19,605	42.14%	▲9.36
LKD	Tukaram Joteappa	1,775	3.82%	▼2.79
Independent	S. Lingayya	909	1.95%	New
BJP	Baswaraj Shantappa Patil	801	1.72%	New
Independent	Srimanth Siddappa	391	0.84%	New
Margin of victory		3,433	7.38%	▼15.94
Turnout		47,964	55.03%	▲2.67
Total valid votes		46,519		
Rejected ballots		1,445	3.01%	▼0.28
Registered electors		87,156		▲12.04
JP hold		Swing	▼6.58	

=== Assembly Election 1983 ===
1983 Karnataka Legislative Assembly election : Chittapur
Party	Candidate	Votes	%	±%
JP	Vishawanath Hebbal Patil	22,096	56.10%	▲29.12
INC	Prabhaker Raghavendrarao	12,911	32.78%	▲19.02
LKD	Neeranna Timmaji	2,603	6.61%	New
Independent	Ramdev. S. Verma	657	1.67%	New
Independent	Rachayya Gangayya Korwar	474	1.20%	New
Independent	M. A. Sattar	329	0.84%	New
Independent	Shivasharnappa Bashateppa	316	0.80%	New
Margin of victory		9,185	23.32%	▼5.77
Turnout		40,727	52.36%	▼0.54
Total valid votes		39,386		
Rejected ballots		1,341	3.29%	▼1.24
Registered electors		77,790		▲5.84
JP gain from INC(I)		Swing	▲0.02	

=== Assembly Election 1978 ===
1978 Karnataka Legislative Assembly election : Chittapur
Party	Candidate	Votes	%	±%
INC(I)	Prabhakar. R. Telkar	20,814	56.08%	New
JP	Kusumakar Desai	10,015	26.98%	New
INC	Subhash Shankarshetty Patil	5,108	13.76%	▼38.75
Independent	Satyanarayan Vyas	1,180	3.18%	New
Margin of victory		10,799	29.09%	▲16.89
Turnout		38,878	52.90%	▲5.71
Total valid votes		37,117		
Rejected ballots		1,761	4.53%	▲4.53
Registered electors		73,497		▼4.64
INC(I) gain from INC		Swing	▲3.57	

=== Assembly Election 1972 ===
1972 Mysore State Legislative Assembly election : Chittapur
Party	Candidate	Votes	%	±%
INC	Vijay Desai	18,392	52.51%	▼7.25
INC(O)	B. Revansidappa Kanta	14,119	40.31%	New
ABJS	Budanna Mahadev	2,513	7.18%	New
Margin of victory		4,273	12.20%	▼16.55
Turnout		36,373	47.19%	▼4.22
Total valid votes		35,024		
Registered electors		77,077		▲31.33
INC hold		Swing	▼7.25	

=== Assembly Election 1967 ===
1967 Mysore State Legislative Assembly election : Chittapur
Party	Candidate	Votes	%	±%
INC	R. Nagappa	17,088	59.76%	▲6.75
SWA	P. Ramreddy	8,867	31.01%	▲2.07
CPI	S. Fakirappa	2,433	8.51%	▼9.54
Independent	S. Baswanappa	204	0.71%	New
Margin of victory		8,221	28.75%	▲4.68
Turnout		30,173	51.41%	▲8.15
Total valid votes		28,592		
Registered electors		58,690		▲11.94
INC hold		Swing	▲6.75	

=== Assembly Election 1962 ===
1962 Mysore State Legislative Assembly election : Chittapur
Party	Candidate	Votes	%	±%
INC	Vijaya Devi Raghavender Rao	11,296	53.01%	▲13.34
SWA	Shantmallappa Anna Rao Bhankur	6,167	28.94%	New
CPI	Srinivas Rao Gudi	3,847	18.05%	▼10.47
Margin of victory		5,129	24.07%	▲16.22
Turnout		22,680	43.26%	▲7.60
Total valid votes		21,310		
Registered electors		52,431		▲5.69
INC hold		Swing	▲13.34	

=== Assembly Election 1957 ===
1957 Mysore State Legislative Assembly election : Chittapur
Party	Candidate	Votes	%	±%
INC	Vijaya Devi Raghavender Rao	7,018	39.67%	▼43.71
Independent	Shantappa Sangapa Herur	5,629	31.82%	New
CPI	Sharnappa Fakirappa	5,045	28.52%	New
Margin of victory		1,389	7.85%	▼58.92
Turnout		17,692	35.66%	▲7.36
Total valid votes		17,692		
Registered electors		49,610		▼10.64
INC hold		Swing	▼43.71	

=== Assembly Election 1952 ===
1952 Hyderabad State Legislative Assembly election : Chittapur
Party	Candidate	Votes	%	±%
INC	Rudrappa	13,103	83.38%	New
PDF	Shantappa Sangappa Herur	2,611	16.62%	New
Margin of victory		10,492	66.77%	
Turnout		15,714	28.30%	
Total valid votes		15,714		
Registered electors		55,519		
INC win (new seat)				

== See also ==
- Chittapur
- Kalaburagi district
- List of constituencies of Karnataka Legislative Assembly
