= Baburao Chinchansur =

Indian politician

Baburao Basavanneppa Chinchansoor
- ಬಾಬುರಾವ್‌ ಬಸವಣ್ಣೆಪ್ಪ ಚಿಂಚನಸೂರ್‌

Member of Karnataka Legislative Council
- In office 5 August 2022 – 21 March 2023
- Preceded by: C. M. Ibrahim
- Succeeded by: N. S. Boseraju
- Constituency: elected by members of Karnataka Legislative Assembly

Minister of Textiles, Ports & Inland Transport of Karnataka
- In office 2013–2016

Member of the Karnataka Legislative Assembly
- In office 2008–2018
- Preceded by: Mallikarjun Kharge
- Succeeded by: Nagangouda Kandkur
- Constituency: Gurmitkal
- In office 1989–2004
- Preceded by: Vishwanath Patil Hebbal
- Succeeded by: Vishwanath Patil Hebbal
- Constituency: Chittapur

Personal details
- Born: 5 April 1951 (age 75) Chinchansur
- Party: Indian National Congress (1989 - 2018) and (2023 - Present)
- Other political affiliations: Bharatiya Janata Party (29 August 2018 - 20 March 2023)
- Education: Mysore University
- Occupation: Politician

Baburao Chinchansur (born 5 April 1951) is an Indian politician and who served as an MLA (Member of Karnataka Legislative Assembly) represented Gurmitkal for three terms and Chittapur for two terms from the state of Karnataka and served as a Minister of Textiles, Ports & Inland Transport of Karnataka from 2013 to 2016. He also served as a Member of Karnataka Legislative Council from 2022 to 2023.

Baburao Chinchansur has been appointed as Karnataka State Border Area Development Authority Chairman in 2016.

== Early life ==
Chinchansur was born in a Koli family to Basavannappa Chinchansur and hails from Gulbarga in Karnataka. He did his Master of Arts from Mysore University.

== Political career ==
Baburao Chinchansur has been elected as MLA for 5 terms, 3 terms from Chittapur Assembly constituency (1989, 1994 and 1999), 2 terms from Gurmitkal Assembly constituency (2008-2013 & 2013-2018). He was the Minister for Textiles Ports & Inland Transport in K. Siddaramaiah led Indian National Congress Karnataka Government. After losing in 2018 Karnataka Legislative Assembly election, he joined the Bharatiya Janata Party on 29 August 2018.

=== BJP ===
After joining BJP in 2018, On 30 July 2022, BJP gave a ticket to Chinchansur for MLC by-polls. On 5 August 2022, he unopposed got elected as a Member of Karnataka Legislative Council (The Upper House of the Karnataka Legislature). Later on 20 March 2023, he resigned from his post.

On 22 March 2023, two days after his resignation from the MLC, Chinchansur joined Indian National Congress.
