= Ninety-eighth Amendment of the Constitution of India =

The 98th Amendment of the Indian Constitution, also known as the Constitution (Ninety-Eighth Amendment) Act, 2012, was an amendment to the Constitution of India enacted on January 01, 2013. It established a separate development board for the Hyderabad-Karnataka region within the state of Karnataka.

== Background ==
The Hyderabad-Karnataka region, comprising parts of the former princely state of Hyderabad, was integrated into the state of Mysore (later renamed Karnataka) in 1956. However, the region faced historical and socio-economic disadvantages compared to other parts of Karnataka. To address these concerns and promote balanced regional development, the demand for a dedicated development board for the region gained momentum.

== The amendment ==
It inserted a new Article 371J into the Constitution. This article provides special provisions for the development of the Hyderabad-Karnataka region. It established a separate development board for the region under Article 371J(2). The board comprises:

- Chairperson appointed by the Governor of Karnataka.
- Members, including representatives from the region, nominated by the state government.

It also mandated the development board to:

- Work for the overall development of the Hyderabad-Karnataka region.
- Ensure equitable opportunities and facilities for the people of the region in matters of:
  - Public employment.
  - Education.
  - Vocational training.
- Submit an annual report on its activities to the State Legislative Assembly of Karnataka.

== Impact ==
The Ninety-eighth Amendment is expected to:

- Foster balanced regional development within Karnataka by addressing the specific needs and challenges of the Hyderabad-Karnataka region.
- Provide greater opportunities and improve the socio-economic conditions for the people residing in the region.
- Promote equitable access to public services and resources.
