= Chinchansur =

- village
- Location in Karnataka, India Chinchansur (India)
- Coordinates: 17.520340°N 76.7855300°E
- Country: India
- State: Karnataka
- District: Gulbarga
- Talukas: Aland

Population (2001)
  - Total: 5,571

Languages
  - Official: Kannada
- Time zone: UTC+5:30 (IST)

Chinchansur is a village in the southern state of Karnataka, India. It is located in the Aland taluk of Kalaburagi district in Karnataka.

== Demographics ==
As of 2001 India census, Chinchansur had a population of 5571 with 2803 males and 2768 females.

== See also ==
- Gulbarga
- Districts of Karnataka
