= Mallikarjun Kharge =

Indian lawyer and politician (born 1942)

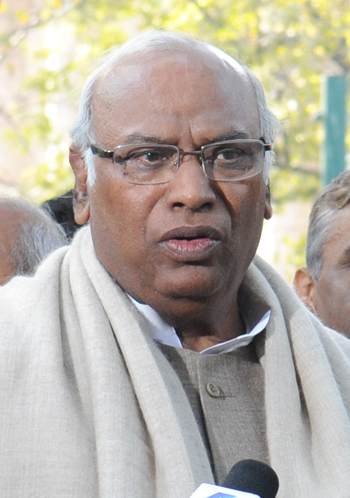
- Kharge in 2014

61st President of the Indian National Congress
- Incumbent
- Assumed office 26 October 2022
- Preceded by: Sonia Gandhi (interim)

Chairman of the Indian National Developmental Inclusive Alliance
- Incumbent
- Assumed office 13 January 2024
- Preceded by: Office established

14th Leader of the Opposition in Rajya Sabha
- Incumbent
- Assumed office 16 February 2021
- Deputy: Anand Sharma; Pramod Tiwari
- Chairman: Venkaiah Naidu; Jagdeep Dhankhar; C. P. Radhakrishnan
- Preceded by: Ghulam Nabi Azad

Member of Parliament, Rajya Sabha
- Incumbent
- Assumed office 12 June 2020
- Preceded by: Rajeev Gowda
- Constituency: Karnataka

Personal details
- Born: Mapanna Mallikarjun Kharge; 21 July 1942 (age 84) Warwatti, Hyderabad State, British India
- Party: Indian National Congress
- Spouse: Radhabai Kharge (m. 1968)
- Children: 5 (including Priyank Kharge)
- Education: Government Arts and Science College, Gulbarga (BA); S.S.L. Law College, Karnatak University (LLB)
- Occupation: Lawyer; politician

Mapanna Mallikarjun Kharge (Kannada: [malːikaːrd͡ʒun kʰɐrɡe]; born 21 July 1942) is an Indian politician and lawyer from the Indian state of Karnataka serving as the 61st President of the Indian National Congress since 2022 and Leader of the Opposition in Rajya Sabha since 2021. He has been a Member of Parliament, Rajya Sabha from Karnataka since 2020. He has been re-elected for Rajya Sabha in June 2026.

He began his career in state politics, serving as a member of the Karnataka Legislative Assembly from Gurmitkal Assembly constituency from 1972 to 2008 and from Chittapur Assembly constituency from 2008 to 2009. Kharge served as the leader of the opposition in the Karnataka Legislative Assembly from 1996 to 1999, president of Karnataka Pradesh Congress Committee from 2005 to 2008, and as a minister in many portfolios under various chief ministers.

Kharge joined national politics when he was elected as the Member of Parliament for Gulbarga, Karnataka, serving from 2009 to 2019. During the UPA 2 government, he served as the Minister of Railways from 2013 to 2014 and Minister of Labour and Employment from 2009 to 2013 in the Union Cabinet. He was also a general secretary of the All India Congress Committee, in charge for Maharashtra, from 2018 to 2020. He was also the chairperson of Public Accounts Committee in the 16th Lok Sabha from 2016 to 2019. After being elected a member of the Rajya Sabha for Karnataka in 2020 following his defeat in the 2019 Indian general election, he defeated Shashi Tharoor in the 2022 Indian National Congress presidential election to succeed Sonia Gandhi. Under his presidency, the Congress gained 47 seats in the 2024 Indian general election with an overall of 99 seats, forming the official opposition for the first time since its defeat in 2014. He is a close ally of the Nehru-Gandhi family.

== Early life and background ==
Mallikarjun Kharge was born on 21 July 1942 in the Varawatti, Bhalki Taluk, Bidar district, Karnataka in a Dalit family to Saibavva and Mapanna Kharge.

In 1948, Kharge lost his mother and sister in a fire set off by the Razakars of the Nizam of Hyderabad, while he himself had a narrow escape at the age of 7. He finished his schooling from Nutan Vidyalaya in Gulbarga and went on to obtain a Bachelor of Arts degree from the Government College, Gulbarga and his law degree from the Seth Shankarlal Lahoti Law College in Gulbarga. He started his legal practice as a junior in Justice Shivaraj Patil's office and fought cases for labour unions early in his legal career.

== Political career ==
Kharge began his political career in state politics, being elected as the MLA for Gurmitkal Assembly constituency and Chittapur Assembly constituency consecutively from 1972 to 2008. During his tenure in state politics, he served as a minister in the ministries of S. M. Krishna, Veerappa Moily, Sarekoppa Bangarappa, and R. Gundu Rao, in many prominent portfolios including the Home and Revenue ministries. In opposition, Kharge served as the leader of the opposition on two occasions and led the Karnataka Pradesh Congress Committee into the 2008 Karnataka Legislative Assembly election as KPCC president, gaining 15 seats for the party and finishing second. He resigned from the legislature in 2009 to run for the Lok Sabha.

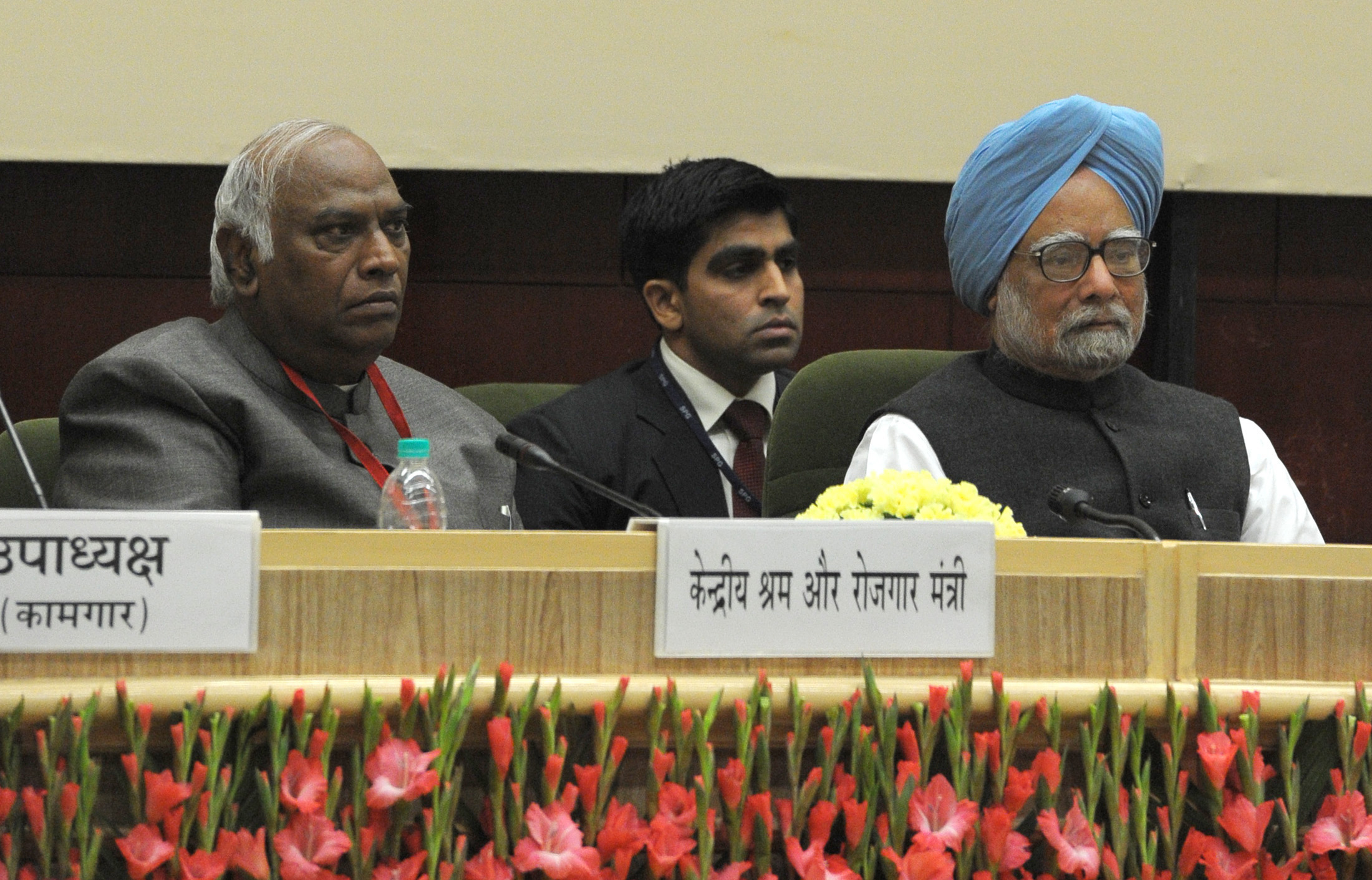
Kharge with 13th Prime Minister of India Manmohan Singh at the 44th session of Indian Labour Conference in New Delhi (2012)

Kharge was first elected to the Lok Sabha in 2009 the general election from Gulbarga. This was his tenth consecutive election victory.

Kharge alongside other state leaders persistently advocated for special status to address regional imbalances in the erstwhile Hyderabad-Karnataka region (now known as Kalyana Karnataka). He campaigned for a constitutional amendment to drive regional development and equitable opportunities however, the UPA 2 did not possess a two-third majority in Parliament therefore he along with then-Congress leader Sonia Gandhi personally lobbied leaders of various political parties to ensure the Ninety-eighth Amendment of the Constitution of India was passed unanimously in both the houses in 2012. The implementation of Article 371J resulted in creating the Kalyana Karnataka Development Board and securing up to 80% reservation in local education and government jobs for residents of the region's seven districts.

In the 2014 general elections, Kharge was elected from Gulbarga, beating Revunaik Belamagih from the BJP with a margin of 13,404 votes. In June, he was appointed the Leader of the Congress party in the Lok Sabha.

In the 2019 general elections, Kharge contested from the same parliamentary seat, however this time he lost to Umesh G. Jadhav from the BJP with a margin of 95,452 votes.

On 12 June 2020 Kharge was elected (unopposed) to the Rajya Sabha from Karnataka, at the age of 78 years. On 12 February 2021, Kharge was appointed Leader of Opposition, Rajya Sabha.

Kharge notably has been appointed an observer by the INC for multiple states in the past, including Assam in 2014, Punjab in 2021, and Rajasthan in 2022. He has been criticized for his alleged inability to resolve internal party issues in these three states and therefore causing the loss in Assam and Punjab, and public embarrassment in Rajasthan.

He is known for his record of defeating all his opposition candidates in his lifetime career except one. In 2023, he received the Lifetime Achievement Award from Lokmat's Parliamentary Awards.

=== President of the Indian National Congress ===
On 1 October 2022, he filed nominations to contest the INC party presidential polls and won with 7897 votes. He was the first INC President not from the Gandhi family in 24 years. He was 61st person to hold the post and 98th president of the party. He was resigned as Leader of the Opposition on 1 October 2022 before nomination, but reinsisted in December 2022. In the first 2 years of his presidency, the Congress formed governments in Himachal Pradesh in 2022, Telangana in 2023, and forming a coalition in Jharkhand in 2024, while losing power in Chhattisgarh and Rajasthan in 2023. The Congress opted out of Omar Abdullah's government in Jammu Kashmir after it sought two ministries but was offered only one even though both parties contested election in alliance. It had won just six of the 39 seats it contested in the state.

==== 2024 general election ====
Kharge's name was proposed as the prime ministerial candidate of the Indian National Developmental Inclusive Alliance for the 2024 general election. The proposal was made by West Bengal chief minister Mamata Banerjee and was supported by Delhi chief minister Arvind Kejriwal. However, other senior leaders of the alliance such as Rashtriya Janata Dal leader Lalu Yadav disapproved the proposal. However, he was made chairman of alliance.

Kharge has been nominated along with six others in the list for Rajya Sabha bye-elections in June 2026.

== Electoral performances ==
Year	Election	Party	Constituency	Result	Votes gained	Vote share%	Margin	Ref
1972	Mysore Legislative Assembly	INC	Gurmitkal	Won	16,796	62.68%%	9,440	
1978	Karnataka Legislative Assembly	INC	Gurmitkal	Won	30,380	64.99%	16,599	
1983	Karnataka Legislative Assembly	INC	Gurmitkal	Won	30,933	67.65%	16,143	
1985	Karnataka Legislative Assembly	INC	Gurmitkal	Won	32,669	66%	17,673	
1989	Karnataka Legislative Assembly	INC	Gurmitkal	Won	39,608	64.23%	19,969	
1994	Karnataka Legislative Assembly	INC	Gurmitkal	Won	42,588	58.76%	19,336	
1999	Karnataka Legislative Assembly	INC	Gurmitkal	Won	54,569	76.76%	47,124	
2004	Karnataka Legislative Assembly	INC	Gurmitkal	Won	37,006	45.99%	18,547	
2008	Karnataka Legislative Assembly	INC	Gurmitkal	Won	49,837	52.13%	17,442	
2009	15th Lok Sabha	INC	Gulbarga	Won	3,45,241	45.46%	13,404	
2014	16th Lok Sabha	INC	Gulbarga	Won	5,07,193	50.83%	74,733	
2019	17th Lok Sabha	INC	Gulbarga	Lost	5,24,740	44.08%	95,452	

== Rajya Sabha elections ==
Election	Year	Constituency	Party	Result	Opponent / Details
Rajya Sabha By-election	2021	Karnataka	INC	Elected unopposed	Vacancy due to retirement of Rajeev Gowda / Ghulam Nabi Azad became LoP
Rajya Sabha Biennial Election	2026	Karnataka	INC	Elected unopposed	Term of Kharge, Iranna Kadadi, Narayana Koragappa and H.D. Deve Gowda ended on 25 June 2026

== Positions held ==
Year	Description
1972–1978	Elected to 5th Mysore Assembly (1st Term): Minister of State for Primary and Secondary Education (1976-1978)
1978–1983	Elected to 6th Karnataka Assembly (2nd Term): Cabinet Minister for Rural Development & Panchayati Raj (1979-1980); Cabinet Minister for Revenue (1980-83)
1983–1985	Elected to 7th Karnataka Assembly (3rd Term): Secretary, Congress Legislature Party
1985–1989	Elected to 8th Karnataka Assembly (4th Term): Deputy Leader of Opposition
1989–1994	Elected to 9th Karnataka Assembly (5th Term): Cabinet Minister for Revenue, Rural Development & Panchayati Raj (1990-1992); Cabinet Minister for Co-operation, Medium and Large Industries (1992-1994)
1994–1999	Elected to 10th Karnataka Assembly (6th Term): Leader of Opposition (1996-99)
1999–2004	Elected to 11th Karnataka Assembly (7th Term): Cabinet Minister for Home, Infrastructure Development and Minor Irrigation (1999-2004)
2004–2008	Elected to 12th Karnataka Assembly (8th Term): Cabinet Minister for Water Resources and Transport (2004-2006)
2008–2009	Elected to 13th Karnataka Assembly (9th Term): Leader of Opposition (2008-2009)
2009–2014	Elected to 15th Lok Sabha (1st Term): Union Minister of Labour and Employment (28 May 2009 – 17 June 2013); Union Minister of Railways (17 June 2013 – 26 May 2014); Union Minister of Social Justice and Empowerment (28 January 2014 – 26 May 2014)
2014–2019	Elected to 16th Lok Sabha (2nd Term): Leader of the Congress Parliamentary Party; Member, Business Advisory Committee (2014–2019); Member, Standing Committee on Home Affairs (2014–2019); Member, Joint Parliamentary Committee on Maintenance of Heritage Character and Development of Parliament House Complex (2014–2019); Member of National Committee (NC) for commemorating the 125th Birth Anniversary of Pandit Jawaharlal Nehru (2014–2019); Member, General Purposes Committee (2015–2019); Member, Consultative Committee, Ministry of Defence (2015–2019); Chairperson, Public Accounts Committee (2017–2019); Member, Committee on Budget of Lok Sabha (2017–2019)
2020–Present	Elected to Rajya Sabha (1st Term): Leader of the Opposition, Rajya Sabha (2021-Present); President of the Indian National Congress (2022-Present)

== Personal life ==
Kharge married Radhabai on 13 May 1968; they have 2 daughters and 3 sons. Kharge is a polyglot and can speak English, Hindi, Urdu, Kannada, Telugu and Marathi. His son Priyank Kharge is an MLA from the Chittapur assembly constituency, and his son-in-law Radhakrishna is an MP from Gulbarga Lok Sabha constituency, Kharge's former seat in the Lok Sabha.

He is a Buddhist and the Founder-Chairman of Siddharth Vihar Trust that has built the Buddha Vihar in Gulbarga, India. He is also a patron of the Chowdiah Memorial Hall, a concert and theater venue in Bangalore. He helped the centre get over its debts and aided the centre's plans for renovation.

== Criticisms ==
Kharge was criticized for calling the population of Gujarat "illiterate" during his assembly election campaign speech in Kerala. Later, he apologized for the remark against the people of Gujarat.

Kharge questioned the practice of 'ganga dip', asking if this practice will remove poverty, drawing criticism from those who saw this as an insult to an individual's faith.

On 21 April 2026, Kharge was part of another controversy when he called the Prime Minister of India, a 'terrorist'. His remark against Modi triggered a political firestorm and questioned the democracy of the nation.

On 24 June 2026, he was accused for 'land grab' through his trust in Karnataka. BJP spokesperson Pradeep Bhandari raised the issue of 'land grab corruption' through the Siddhartha Vihar Trust, the trust includes Mallikarjun Kharge, his son Priyank Kharge, his son-in-law and his wife. Chief Minister of Karnataka, D.K. Shivkumar was asked to take actions under Prevention of Corruption Act. It was further denied by the Kharge family.

== See also ==
- List of Jatavs
- List of presidents of the Indian National Congress
- 2022 Indian National Congress presidential election

Lok Sabha
Preceded by Iqbal Ahmed Sarandi	Member of Parliament for Gulbarga; 2009–2019	Succeeded by Umesh. G. Jadhav
Political offices
Preceded by Oscar Fernandes	Minister of Labour and Employment; 2009–2013	Succeeded by Sis Ram Ola
Preceded by CP Joshi	Minister of Railways; 2013–2014	Succeeded by DV Sadananda Gowda
Party political offices
Preceded by Janardhana Poojary	President of Karnataka Pradesh Congress Committee; 2005–2008	Succeeded by R. V. Deshpande
Preceded by Sushilkumar Shinde	Leader of the Indian National Congress in the Lok Sabha; 2014–2019	Succeeded by Adhir Ranjan Chowdhury
Preceded by Ghulam Nabi Azad	Leader of the Opposition in the Rajya Sabha; 2022–	Incumbent
Preceded by Sonia Gandhi	President of the Indian National Congress; 2022–present	Incumbent
