= Article 371J of the Constitution of India =

Provision that grants special status to the Kalyana Karnataka region

Parliament of India
- Long title: A article to make special provisions with respect to the State of Karnataka for the establishment of a separate development board for the Hyderabad-Karnataka region, to provide for equitable allocation of funds for developmental expenditure, and to provide for reservations in educational and vocational training institutions and in public employment for persons who belong to the said region.
- Citation: Act No. 98 of 2012
- Territorial extent: The Hyderabad-Karnataka region of the state of Karnataka, specifically the districts of Kalaburagi, Bidar, Yadgir, Raichur, Koppal, and Bellary.
- Passed by: Lok Sabha
- Passed: 18 December 2012
- Passed by: Rajya Sabha
- Passed: 19 December 2012
- Assented to by: President of India
- Assented to: 1 January 2013
- Commenced: 1 January 2013
- Status: In force

Article 371J of the Constitution of India is a special provision that grants special status to the Kalyana Karnataka region (formerly known as Hyderabad-Karnataka) in the state of Karnataka. It was inserted into the Constitution by the Constitution (Ninety-eighth Amendment) Act, 2012, and came into force on 1 January 2013. The article provides for measures such as reservation in education and employment, and the establishment of a dedicated development board to address regional imbalances.

== Background ==
The six districts of the Hyderabad-Karnataka region—Bidar, Kalaburagi, Yadgir, Raichur, Koppal, and Vijayapura—were part of the erstwhile Hyderabad State and were integrated into Karnataka following the States Reorganisation Act. The region lagged behind others in the state on socio-economic indicators such as literacy, health, and infrastructure. This backwardness has been attributed to its history under the Nizam's rule and its slower integration and development post-Independence.

A political movement, led by organizations such as the Hyderabad-Karnataka Horata Samiti, demanded special status for the region. This culminated in the central government, based on the recommendations of the Justice Raghavendra Rao Committee, approving the constitutional amendment.

The Constitution (Ninety-eighth Amendment) Bill, 2012 was introduced in the Lok Sabha on 3 December 2012. It was passed by both houses of Parliament and received the President's assent on 1 January 2013, becoming an Act. The amendment came into force on 2 January 2013.

== Provisions ==
Article 371J empowers the President of India to issue an order directing that special provisions be made for the Hyderabad-Karnataka region. The key provisions include:

- Establishment of a separate Development board for the region to ensure equitable allocation of funds for development projects.
- Reservation in educational and vocational training institutions for students who belong to the region. This reservation applies to both state-run and private institutions within the state.
- Reservation in state government posts for persons who belong to the region.
- The President may direct the State Government to ensure equitable opportunities and facilities in public employment and education.

The order defining the specifics of these reservations was issued by the President in 2013.

== Implementation ==
In September 2013, the President gave consent for the constitution of the Kalyana Karnataka Region Development Board (KKRDB), a body headed by the Governor of Karnataka to oversee the development of the region. The state government has issued orders to shift the special cell responsible for implementing Article 371J from Bengaluru to Kalaburagi, the largest city within the region. There have been political demands to form a separate ministry dedicated to the implementation of Article 371J. In February 2024, the state cabinet cleared over ₹1,100 crore for various development works in the Kalyana Karnataka region.

== Legal challenges and interpretation ==
The implementation of Article 371J has been subject to legal scrutiny and rulings by the Karnataka High Court.

- In a July 2019 ruling, the High Court clarified that the reservation benefits for "locals" were not limited to those born or permanently residing in the region. The court held that the benefit must extend to all persons who are domiciled in the Kalyana Karnataka region. It also ruled that the reservation in government posts applies to jobs across the entire state of Karnataka, not just those within the region. This interpretation was later reinforced by a circular from the High Court registry.
- The High Court has ruled that OCI cardholders are ineligible to claim benefits under the Article 371J quota in professional colleges.
- Specific provisions, such as reservations in promotions for engineers in state public sector undertakings like the Karnataka Power Corporation Limited (KPCL), have been challenged in court.

== Impact and analysis ==
The impact of Article 371J has been a subject of debate. Proponents argue it has led to increased investment and more opportunities in education and employment for locals. Political leaders have promised to develop the region on par with other areas of the state.

Critics point to shortcomings. Analyses have suggested that the Kalyana Karnataka Region Development Board has faced challenges due to bureaucratic delays and funding issues. Reports have noted that the 2019 renaming of the region from Hyderabad-Karnataka to Kalyana Karnataka was not accompanied by substantial developmental changes. This has led to public demand for its effective implementation, including protests and debates on extending similar benefits to other regions like Ballari.

== See also ==
- Article 371 of the Constitution of India
- States of India by size of economy
