= Yadgir Assembly constituency =

Legislative Assembly constituency in Karnataka State, India

Coordinates: 16.76°N 77.13°E

Yadgir
- Constituency No. 38 for the Karnataka Legislative Assembly

Constituency details
- Country: India
- Region: South India
- State: Karnataka
- District: Yadgir
- Lok Sabha constituency: Raichur
- Established: 1951
- Total electors: 237,435
- Reservation: None

Member of Legislative Assembly
- 16th Karnataka Legislative Assembly
- Incumbent Channareddy Patil Tunnur
- Party: Indian National Congress
- Preceded by: Venkatreddy Mudnal

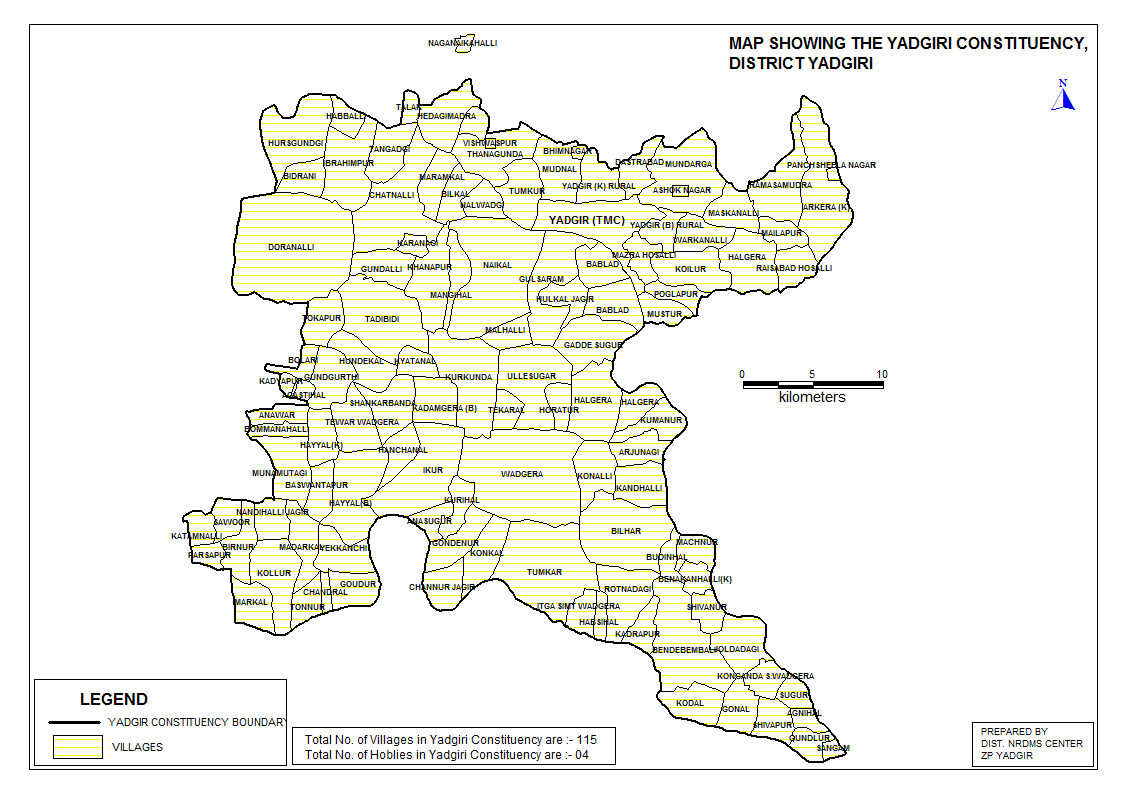
Yadgir Vidhana Sabha constituency map

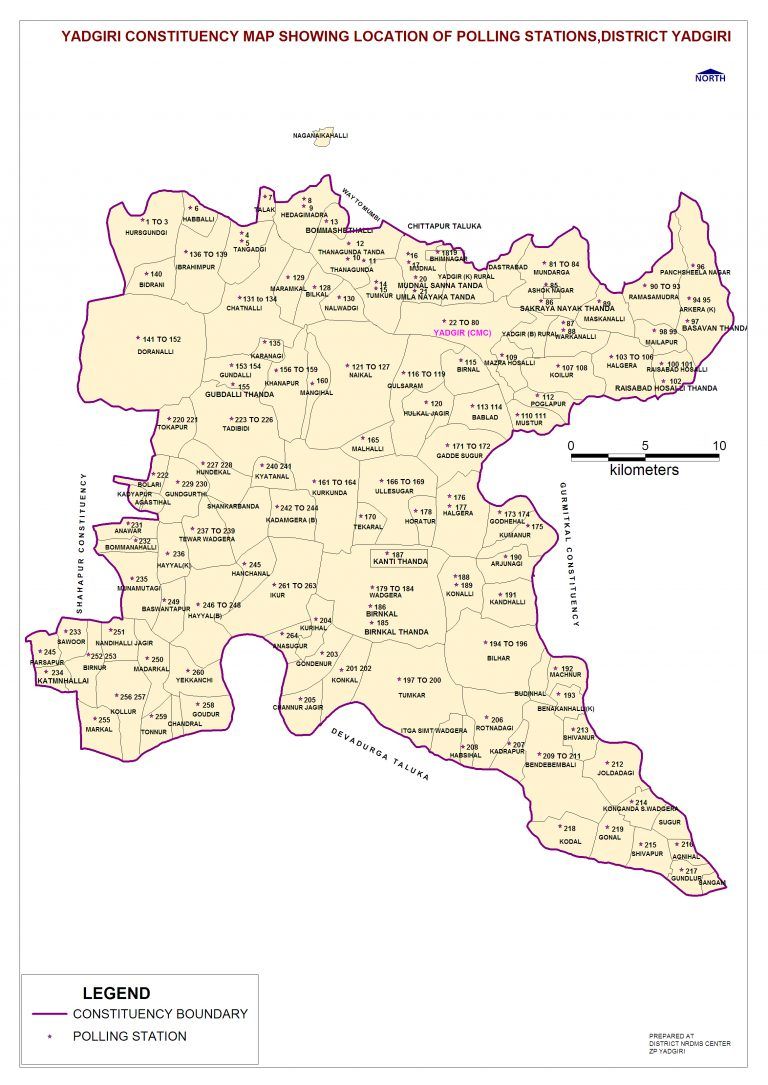
Yadgir Vidhana Sabha constituency map

Yadgir Assembly constituency is one of the 224 Legislative Assembly constituencies of Karnataka in India.

It is part of Yadgir district. Channareddy Patil Tunnur is the current MLA of Yadgir Assembly constituency.

== Members of the Legislative Assembly ==
Election	Member	Party
1952	Jagannath Rao Chandriki	Indian National Congress
1952	Ambadas	Indian National Congress
1957	Baswantaraya	Independent politician
1962	Bhoj Raj	Lok Sewak Sangh
1967	V. R. Rachangouda	Independent politician
1972	Vishwanath Reddy	Independent politician
1978	Sharnapa Nagappa Kalburgi Sharnapa Nagappa Kalburgi	Indian National Congress
1983	Vishwanath Reddy	Janata Party
1985	Vishwanath Reddy	Janata Party
1989	Dr. A. B. Malaka Reddy	Indian National Congress
1994	Dr. A. B. Malaka Reddy	Indian National Congress
1999	Dr. A. B. Malaka Reddy	Indian National Congress
2004	Veer Basawanthreddy Mudnal	Independent politician
2008	Dr. A. B. Malaka Reddy	Indian National Congress
2013	Dr. A. B. Malaka Reddy	Indian National Congress
2018	Venkatreddy Mudnal	Bharatiya Janata Party
2023	Channareddy Patil Tunnur	Indian National Congress

== Election results ==
=== Assembly Election 2023 ===
2023 Karnataka Legislative Assembly election : Yadgir
Party	Candidate	Votes	%	±%
INC	Channareddy Patil Tunnur	53,802	34.71%	▲0.55
BJP	Venkatreddy Mudnal	50,129	32.34%	▼10.74
Independent	Hanamagouda Beerankal	36,838	23.77%	New
JD(S)	Dr. A. B. Malaka Reddy	7,420	4.79%	▼13.05
NOTA	None of the above	1,609	1.04%	▼0.10
Margin of victory		3,673	2.37%	▼6.55
Turnout		155,032	65.29%	▲3.93
Total valid votes		155,002		
Registered electors		237,435		▲0.74
INC gain from BJP		Swing	▼8.37	

=== Assembly Election 2018 ===
2018 Karnataka Legislative Assembly election : Yadgir
Party	Candidate	Votes	%	±%
BJP	Venkatreddy Mudnal	62,227	43.08%	▲40.32
INC	Dr. A. B. Malaka Reddy	49,346	34.16%	▲2.82
JD(S)	A. C. Kadloor	25,774	17.84%	▼0.74
NOTA	None of the above	1,648	1.14%	New
AIMEP	M. Basavaraj Padukoti	1,074	0.74%	New
Bhartiya Republican Party (Insan)	Irappa. M. Kasan	1,068	0.74%	New
Bharatiya Prajagala Kalyana Paksha	Saidappa	993	0.69%	New
Margin of victory		12,881	8.92%	▲1.86
Turnout		144,611	61.36%	▼1.53
Total valid votes		144,449		
Registered electors		235,682		▲23.69
BJP gain from INC		Swing	▲11.74	

=== Assembly Election 2013 ===
2013 Karnataka Legislative Assembly election : Yadgir
Party	Candidate	Votes	%	±%
INC	Dr. Maalakareddy	40,434	31.34%	▼7.68
KJP	Veer Basawanthreddy Mudnal	31,330	24.28%	New
JD(S)	Abdul Nabi Kadloor	23,977	18.58%	▲0.67
BSRCP	Moulali Anapur	12,721	9.86%	New
BJP	Chandrashekar Gouda Magnoor	3,556	2.76%	▼31.39
Independent	Siddramappa	3,141	2.43%	New
Independent	Basannagouda Naikal	1,758	1.36%	New
Independent	Ananth Reddy Kandalli	1,103	0.85%	New
Independent	Jalandhar Rao	932	0.72%	New
Margin of victory		9,104	7.06%	▲2.19
Turnout		119,827	62.89%	▲8.57
Total valid votes		129,030		
Registered electors		190,545		▲11.09
INC hold		Swing	▼7.68	

=== Assembly Election 2008 ===
2008 Karnataka Legislative Assembly election : Yadgir
Party	Candidate	Votes	%	±%
INC	Dr. A. B. Malaka Reddy	36,348	39.02%	▲10.76
BJP	Dr. Veerabaswanthreddy Mudnal	31,812	34.15%	New
JD(S)	Srinivas Reddy Chennur	16,687	17.91%	▼5.45
Independent	Riyaz Ahmed (Pyrish Tailor)	2,806	3.01%	New
BSP	Eshwar Chetan	2,708	2.91%	▲0.30
LJP	Sharanappa Sajjan	1,449	1.56%	New
Independent	Amruthayya Basayya	1,350	1.45%	New
Margin of victory		4,536	4.87%	▼7.66
Turnout		93,164	54.32%	▼1.33
Total valid votes		93,160		
Registered electors		171,518		▲4.41
INC gain from Independent		Swing	▼1.77	

=== Assembly Election 2004 ===
2004 Karnataka Legislative Assembly election : Yadgir
Party	Candidate	Votes	%	±%
Independent	Veer Basawanthreddy Mudnal	37,222	40.79%	New
INC	Dr. A. B. Malaka Reddy	25,788	28.26%	▼16.50
JD(S)	Kadlur. A. C	21,316	23.36%	▲11.64
Kannada Nadu Party	Shoukath Ali	2,521	2.76%	New
BSP	Dr. Devanand Koli	2,385	2.61%	▲1.21
JD(U)	Malleshappa Ayevur	2,018	2.21%	▼27.92
Margin of victory		11,434	12.53%	▼2.10
Turnout		91,425	55.65%	▲0.12
Total valid votes		91,250		
Registered electors		164,279		▲16.45
Independent gain from INC		Swing	▼3.97	

=== Assembly Election 1999 ===
1999 Karnataka Legislative Assembly election : Yadgir
Party	Candidate	Votes	%	±%
INC	Dr. A. B. Malaka Reddy	33,242	44.76%	▲6.02
JD(U)	Dr. Veerabaswanthreddy Mudnal	22,380	30.13%	New
Independent	Moulali Anapur	8,903	11.99%	New
JD(S)	Siddanna	8,703	11.72%	New
BSP	Dr. Linganagouda	1,042	1.40%	▼9.97
Margin of victory		10,862	14.63%	▲4.75
Turnout		78,337	55.53%	▼2.57
Total valid votes		74,270		
Rejected ballots		4,067	5.19%	▲1.29
Registered electors		141,076		▲15.77
INC hold		Swing	▲6.02	

=== Assembly Election 1994 ===
1994 Karnataka Legislative Assembly election : Yadgir
Party	Candidate	Votes	%	±%
INC	Malakaraddy Lakshmareddy	26,359	38.74%	▼20.91
JD	Sadashivaraddy Kandakur	19,635	28.86%	New
INC	Basavarajappa Wadageri	10,593	15.57%	New
BSP	Abdul Nabi Kadloor	7,733	11.37%	New
BJP	Prabhulinga Warad	3,063	4.50%	New
Independent	Sha. Champalal Jain	657	0.97%	New
Margin of victory		6,724	9.88%	▼22.91
Turnout		70,801	58.10%	▲1.77
Total valid votes		68,040		
Rejected ballots		2,761	3.90%	▼2.44
Registered electors		121,860		▲6.39
INC hold		Swing	▼20.91	

=== Assembly Election 1989 ===
1989 Karnataka Legislative Assembly election : Yadgir
Party	Candidate	Votes	%	±%
INC	Malakaraddy Lakshmareddy	36,053	59.65%	▲15.79
JP	Sadsivreddy	16,238	26.87%	New
Independent	Moulali Anapur	4,613	7.63%	New
Kranti Sabha	Basawaraj Siddramappa Rachareddy	3,129	5.18%	New
Independent	Hanamanth	403	0.67%	New
Margin of victory		19,815	32.79%	▲24.91
Turnout		64,525	56.33%	▼6.31
Total valid votes		60,436		
Rejected ballots		4,089	6.34%	▲3.51
Registered electors		114,539		▲25.44
INC gain from JP		Swing	▲7.91	

=== Assembly Election 1985 ===
1985 Karnataka Legislative Assembly election : Yadgir
Party	Candidate	Votes	%	±%
JP	Vishwanath Reddy	28,756	51.74%	▼3.64
INC	Dr. A. B. Malaka Reddy	24,374	43.86%	▲7.30
Independent	Mohmed Osman	1,127	2.03%	New
Independent	Bhimanna Ginde	761	1.37%	New
BJP	Syed Saleem Pasha Quadari	559	1.01%	▼4.06
Margin of victory		4,382	7.88%	▼10.94
Turnout		57,194	62.64%	▲4.03
Total valid votes		55,577		
Rejected ballots		1,617	2.83%	▼1.12
Registered electors		91,307		▲11.18
JP hold		Swing	▼3.64	

=== Assembly Election 1983 ===
1983 Karnataka Legislative Assembly election : Yadgir
Party	Candidate	Votes	%	±%
JP	Vishwanath Reddy	25,606	55.38%	▲14.66
INC	Ishwar Chander Lingappa Kollur	16,904	36.56%	▲34.76
BJP	S. Balkal	2,344	5.07%	New
Independent	Timmanna Bangarappa Achekeri	1,381	2.99%	New
Margin of victory		8,702	18.82%	▲4.01
Turnout		48,134	58.61%	▼9.06
Total valid votes		46,235		
Rejected ballots		1,899	3.95%	▲0.03
Registered electors		82,128		▲4.75
JP gain from INC(I)		Swing	▼0.15	

=== Assembly Election 1978 ===
1978 Karnataka Legislative Assembly election : Yadgir
Party	Candidate	Votes	%	±%
INC(I)	Sharnapa Nagappa Kalburgi Sharnapa Nagappa Kalburgi	28,309	55.53%	New
JP	Vishwanathreddy Rachabngouda	20,759	40.72%	New
Independent	Champalal Chogalal Jain	988	1.94%	New
INC	Sabbanangouda Karangouda	920	1.80%	▼46.13
Margin of victory		7,550	14.81%	▲13.30
Turnout		53,054	67.67%	▲8.83
Total valid votes		50,976		
Rejected ballots		2,078	3.92%	▲3.92
Registered electors		78,406		▲3.23
INC(I) gain from Independent		Swing	▲6.09	

=== Assembly Election 1972 ===
1972 Mysore State Legislative Assembly election : Yadgir
Party	Candidate	Votes	%	±%
Independent	Vishwanath Reddy	21,068	49.44%	New
INC	Shivanna	20,423	47.93%	▲2.97
ABJS	B. Jayacharya	1,119	2.63%	New
Margin of victory		645	1.51%	▼8.56
Turnout		44,690	58.84%	▼8.94
Total valid votes		42,610		
Registered electors		75,954		▲11.97
Independent hold		Swing	▼5.60	

=== Assembly Election 1967 ===
1967 Mysore State Legislative Assembly election : Yadgir
Party	Candidate	Votes	%	±%
Independent	V. R. Rachangouda	23,318	55.04%	New
INC	K. R. Nadgouda	19,050	44.96%	▼1.53
Margin of victory		4,268	10.07%	▲3.04
Turnout		45,980	67.78%	▲14.25
Total valid votes		42,368		
Registered electors		67,833		▲16.45
Independent gain from Lok Sewak Sangh		Swing	▲1.53	

=== Assembly Election 1962 ===
1962 Mysore State Legislative Assembly election : Yadgir
Party	Candidate	Votes	%	±%
Lok Sewak Sangh	Bhoj Raj	15,872	53.51%	New
INC	Konappa Rudrappa Nadagouda	13,788	46.49%	▼1.43
Margin of victory		2,084	7.03%	▲2.88
Turnout		31,179	53.53%	▲8.29
Total valid votes		29,660		
Registered electors		58,250		▲8.92
Lok Sewak Sangh gain from Independent		Swing	▲1.43	

=== Assembly Election 1957 ===
1957 Mysore State Legislative Assembly election : Yadgir
Party	Candidate	Votes	%	±%
Independent	Baswantaraya	12,600	52.08%	New
INC	Jagannath Rao Venkat Rao	11,595	47.92%	▼2.61
Margin of victory		1,005	4.15%	▲0.38
Turnout		24,195	45.24%	▼25.38
Total valid votes		24,195		
Registered electors		53,481		▼44.58
Independent gain from INC		Swing	▲25.44	

=== Assembly Election 1952 ===
1952 Hyderabad State Legislative Assembly election : Yadgir
Party	Candidate	Votes	%	±%
INC	Jagannath Rao Chandriki	18,154	26.64%	New
INC	Ambadas	16,282	23.89%	New
Independent	Basavarajeppa	15,588	22.88%	New
Independent	Lingappa	10,910	16.01%	New
Independent	Ishwarilal	5,374	7.89%	New
Socialist Party (India)	Rachappa	1,836	2.69%	New
Margin of victory		2,566	3.77%	
Turnout		68,144	35.31%	
Total valid votes		68,144		
Registered electors		96,495		
INC win (new seat)				

== See also ==
- List of constituencies of the Karnataka Legislative Assembly
- Yadgir district
- Yadgir (Lok Sabha constituency)
