= Venkatreddy Mudnal =

Indian politician (1954–2024)

Member of the Karnataka Legislative Assembly
- In office 2018–2023
- Preceded by: A. B. Malakareddy
- Succeeded by: Channareddy Patil Tunnur,
- Constituency: Yadgir

Personal details
- Born: 28 March 1954 Yadgir, Hyderabad State, India
- Died: 17 September 2024 (aged 70) Bengaluru, Karnataka, India
- Party: Bharatiya Janata Party
- Parent: Vishwanath Reddy Mudnal (Father)
- Education: B.Com
- Alma mater: S.B.College, Gulbarga (1976)
- Profession: Agriculturist and Business

Venkatreddy Mudnal (28 March 1954 – 17 September 2024) was an Indian politician who was a MLA of Yadgir. He is the son of Freedom Fighter and Former Animal Husbandry Minister Vishwanath Reddy Mudnal who was also MLA from the same constituency.

== Political career ==
Mudnal represented Yadgir (Vidhana Sabha constituency) of the Karnataka Legislative Assembly.

Venkatreddy Mudnal was a Member of the Bharatiya Janata Party (BJP), a political party.

== Positions held ==
- President of Town Municipal Council – Yadgir.
- Member of Karnataka Legislative Assembly – 2018.

== Death ==
Mudnal died on 17 September 2024, at the age of 70.
