= Gol Gumbaz =

Basalt mausoleum located in Bijapur, India

- Gol Gumbad
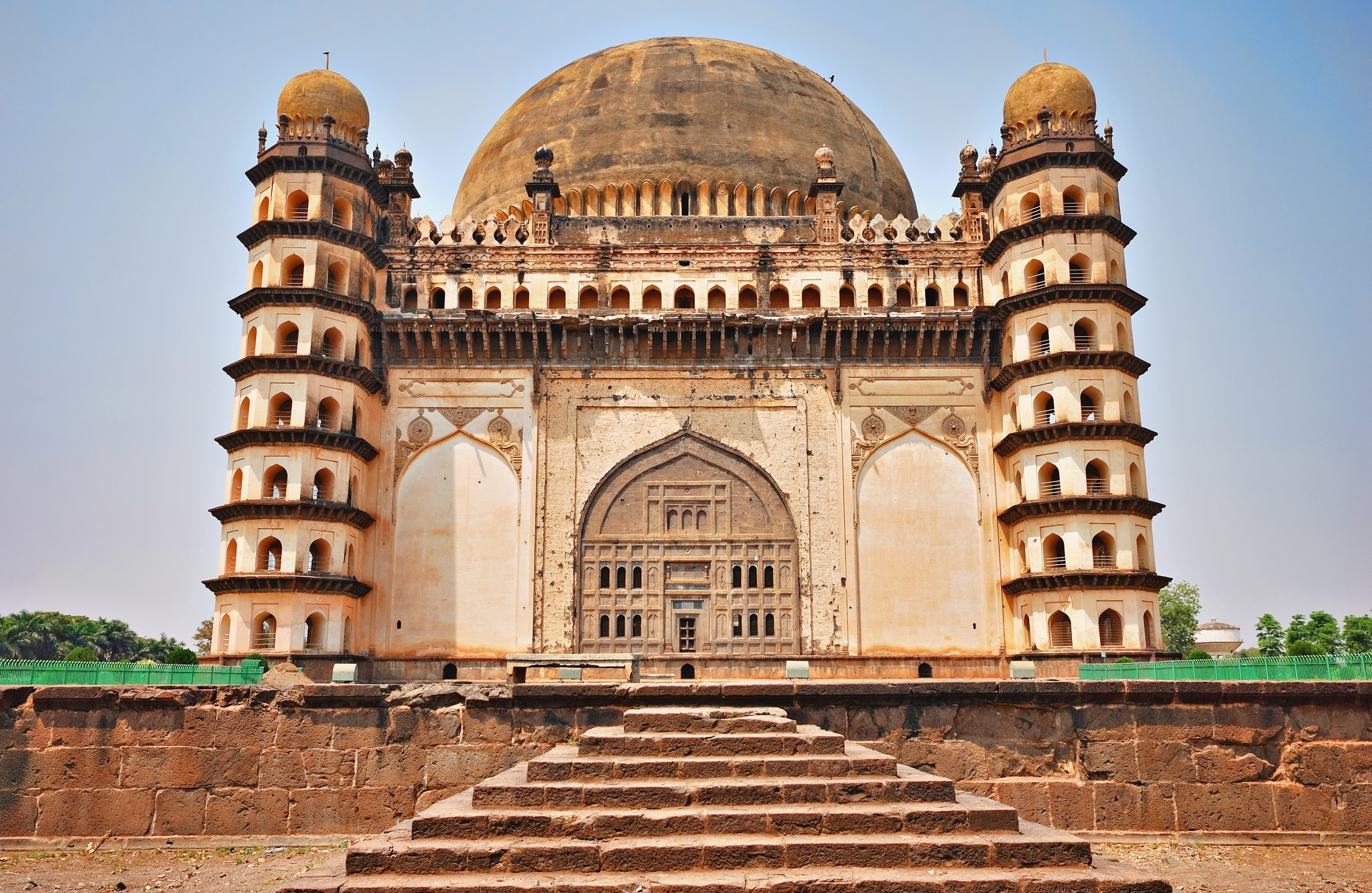
- Western view of the Gol Gumbaz
- Interactive map of Gol Gumbaz
- 16°49′48.11″N 75°44′9.95″E
- Type: Mausoleum
- Location: Bijapur, Karnataka, India

History
- Built: 1656; 370 years ago
- Built for: Mohammed Adil Shah of Bijapur

Site notes
- Material: Dark grey basalt, plaster
- Height: 60.5 m (198 ft)
- Width: 41 m (135 ft)
- Area: 1,700 m^{2} (18,000 sq ft)
- Architectural style: Indo-Islamic architecture
- Governing body: Ministry of Culture, Government of India (via Archaeological Survey of India)

Monument of National Importance
- Official name: Gol Gumbaz
- Reference no.: N-KA-D142

The Gol Gumbaz (/ˌɡoʊl ɡʊm.bəz/; lit. 'Round Dome'), also written as Gol Gumbad, is a dark gray basalt mausoleum located in the city of Bijapur in northern Karnataka, India. It contains the tomb of Mohammad Adil Shah, the seventh ruler of the Sultanate of Bijapur, alongside the tombs of his two wives, mistress, daughter and grandson. Construction of the monument began in the early 17th century following Adil Shah's ascension to the throne, and halted in 1656 after his death; at the time, the structure was not yet fully complete, with several decorative elements remaining unfinished. The mausoleum is a prominent example of Indo-Islamic architecture in the Deccan region, and combines elements of Persian, Central Asian, Mughal, and local architectural styles.

A notable architectural feature of the tomb is its central hemispherical dome. With an external diameter of 44 m (144 ft), it was the largest unsupported dome in India and among the largest domes of the medieval era at the time of its completion. In 1892, during the British Raj, the mausoleum was opened to the public and the Gol Gumbaz Archaeological Museum was established within the tomb complex. The central dome's whispering gallery has since become a popular tourist attraction. Following Indian independence, the management and maintenance of the complex was handed over to the Archaeological Survey of India in 1962.

In addition to the main mausoleum, the overall complex encompasses multiple Indo-Persian structures, including a mosque, a dargah, and a naqqar khana surrounded by a charbagh garden. UNESCO has included the Gol Gumbaz within a broader group of monuments known as the Monuments and Forts of the Deccan Sultanate, which was added to the organization's tentative list as a proposed World Heritage Site in 2014.

== Etymology ==
The name Gol Gumbaz is of Deccani origin. Gol (lit. "round"), inherited from the Sanskrit word gola, refers to a round or spherical object. The word gumbaz (lit. "dome") is derived from the Farsi word گنبد (gumbad), and refers to the monument's large central dome, a feature commonly seen in Islamic mausoleums constructed in Persia, Central Asia and South Asia during the medieval period.

== History ==
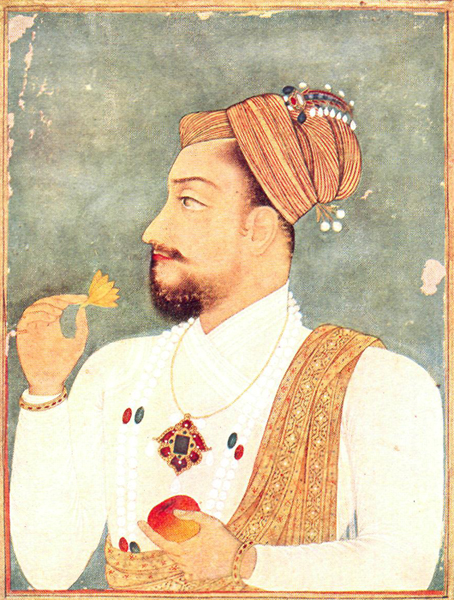
Mohammed Adil Shah, c. 1645

In 1627, Mohammed Adil Shah ascended the throne of Bijapur, succeeding his father Ibrahim Adil Shah II. Ibrahim was known as a significant patron of the arts, and had commissioned the construction of a large mausoleum and prayer hall on the outskirts of Bijapur during his reign. The mausoleum, known as the Ibrahim Rauza, was completed by Ibrahim's wife Taj Sultana shortly before his demise in 1627, and is noted by art historians for its intricate stone carvings and calligraphic compositions. During Mohammed Adil Shah's rule, the Sultanate of Bijapur reached its greatest territorial extent. Adil Shah signed a peace treaty with the Mughal emperor Shah Jahan in 1636, following the latter's conquest of the Ahmednagar Sultanate, and conducted several raids into Tamilakam and other areas of southern India, ably supported by his generals Ranadulla Khan and Shahaji Bhonsle.

=== Construction ===
Construction of the Gol Gumbaz began during the early years of Mohammed Adil Shah's reign, and continued until his death in 1656. Mohammed intended for the finished tomb to surpass his father's mausoleum in size and scale, continuing a tradition of the rulers of Bijapur. To this end, the sultan commissioned architects and engineers from different regions of the Indian subcontinent to plan and construct the mausoleum, while hiring local laborers to perform decorative work. The Gol Gumbaz was built in three distinct stages, beginning with the construction of the foundation and a raised platform at its center, followed by the building of the four exterior basalt walls joined by octagonal minarets at each corner, and culminating in the erection of the massive central dome made of brick and layers of lime mortar. The mausoleum's façade, inner walls and other exposed surfaces were subsequently decorated with plaster. While the chief architect of the mausoleum is not known from any contemporary inscriptions, historians have speculated that Malik Yaqut, an Abyssinian slave architect who oversaw the completion of the Jamiya Masjid during Mohammed's reign, played a significant role in the design of the Gol Gumbaz.

An inscription in the tomb records that Mohammed imported a piece of soil from the shrine of Husayn ibn Ali in Karbala and had it placed in the central vault of the Gol Gumbaz during its construction. The site of the mausoleum was located directly behind the dargah of Hashim Peer Dastagir, a Sufi saint who counted Mohammed as one of his disciples; historian Richard Eaton views this as suggestive of the close relationship between the ruler and the saint. Following Mohammed's death, which occurred while the inner walls of the tomb were still being plastered, construction of the complex was brought to a halt, and the mausoleum was left in an unfinished state. Mohammed Adil Shah's death was recorded in a Persian inscription above the southern entrance to the tomb dated to 1656, which reads:

The end of Muhammad has become laudable.

Muhammad Sultan whose abode is in Paradise.

The abode of peace became Muhammad Shah.

During the reign of Mohammed's successor Ali Adil Shah II, a separate wing was added to the northern side of the tomb at an unknown date. The addition was unfinished, and remains unoccupied.

=== Later years ===
Gol Gumbaz c. 1890

Following the death of Mohammed Adil Shah, the Adil Shahi dynasty entered a period of decline due to recurring conflicts with the Mughals and Marathas. In 1686, Aurangzeb captured the city of Bijapur after a prolonged siege, and annexed the former Sultanate of Bijapur as a subah of the Mughal Empire. In the years following the Mughal conquest, the Gol Gumbaz and the surrounding tomb complex were largely abandoned, and the city of Bijapur was depopulated due to famine, floods and a cholera epidemic. In 1818, the city was occupied by armies of the East India Company at the conclusion of the Third Anglo-Maratha War, and formally absorbed into the Bombay Presidency in 1848. The British administration designated Bijapur as the administrative headquarters of the district in 1885.

In 1891, Scottish archaeologist Henry Cousens visited Bijapur in order to establish a museum under the aegis of the Archaeological Survey of India. Cousens surveyed and wrote extensively on the architectural remains of Bijapur, including the Gol Gumbaz, which he described as "one of the greatest domes the world has seen". The following year, the British administration opened the Gol Gumbaz Archaeological Museum in the adjacent naqqar khana (drum house), and used it to store a variety of sculptures, manuscripts, and other historical artifacts found throughout the Deccan. The administration also repaired a damaged cornice on the eastern side of the Gol Gumbaz in 1900, and performed further repair work of the monument's central dome in 1937, which had begun to show radial cracks and signs of damage due to rainwater seepage. Officials attempted to waterproof the dome and repair the cracked sections by covering the exterior with a 6.5 cm (2.6 in) thick layer of gunite, and repeated the process on the interior surface of the dome between 1949 and 1951 at an estimated cost of Rs. 218,000.

In 1962, the Gol Gumbaz and its surrounding complex was brought under the jurisdiction of the Archaeological Survey of India. The mausoleum has since been designated as a protected monument under the Dharwad Circle of the ASI. In 2018, the Gol Gumbaz was among several Deccan Sultanate-era monuments jointly nominated by Karnataka and Telangana as a UNESCO World Heritage Site. The group of monuments, known as the "Monuments and Forts of the Deccan Sultanate", was added to UNESCO's tentative list in 2014.

On November 16, 2022, Salim Tikkotkar, a 55-year old resident of Bijapur, committed suicide at the Gol Gumbaz by jumping from the roof. The following month, a 19-year old girl committed suicide by jumping off the seventh floor of the monument. District authorities expressed concern over the mausoleum becoming a potential "suicide point", and responded by increasing the police presence at the monument, citing the difficulty of managing large numbers of students and tourists within the tomb.

== Architecture ==
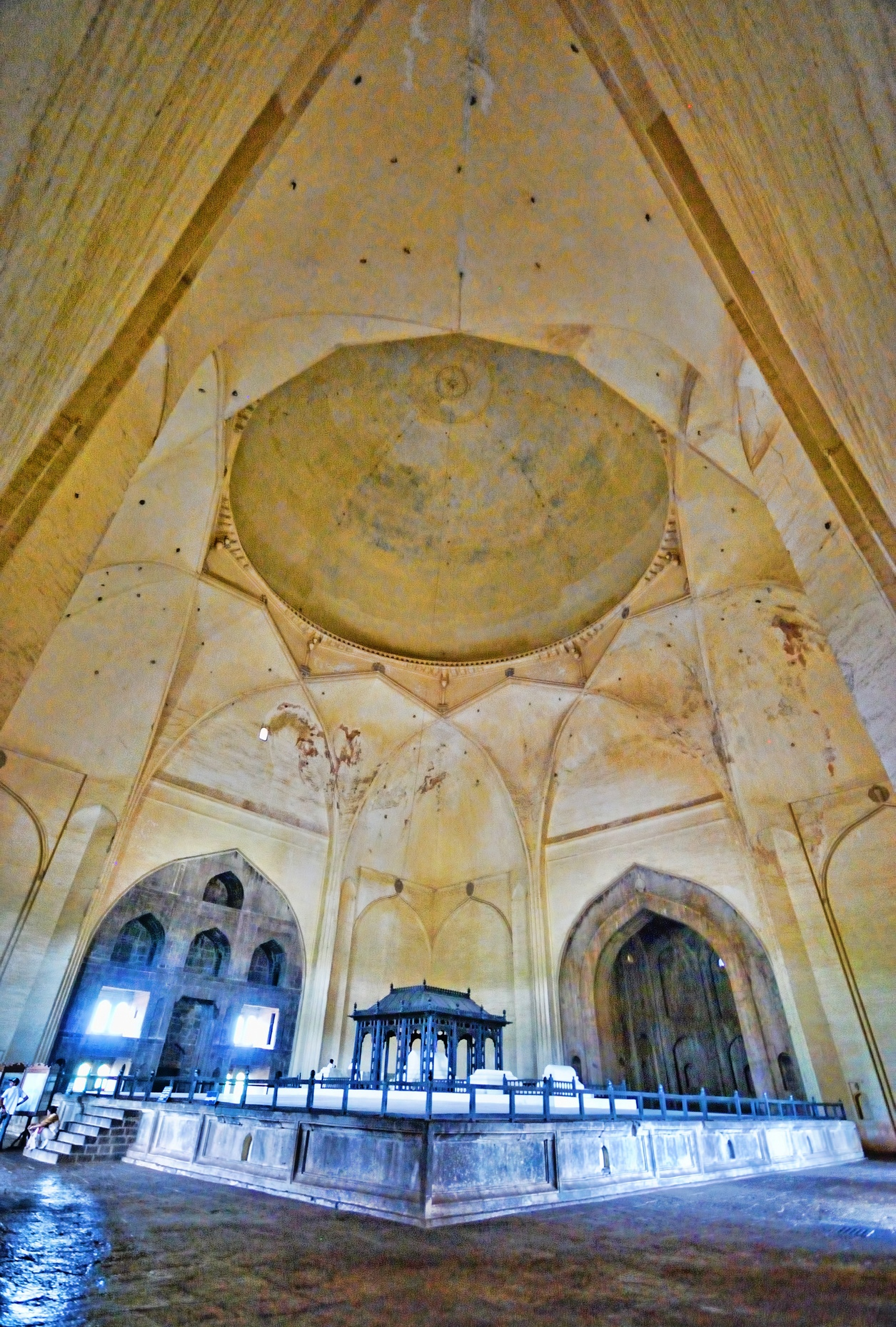
Mausoleum interior

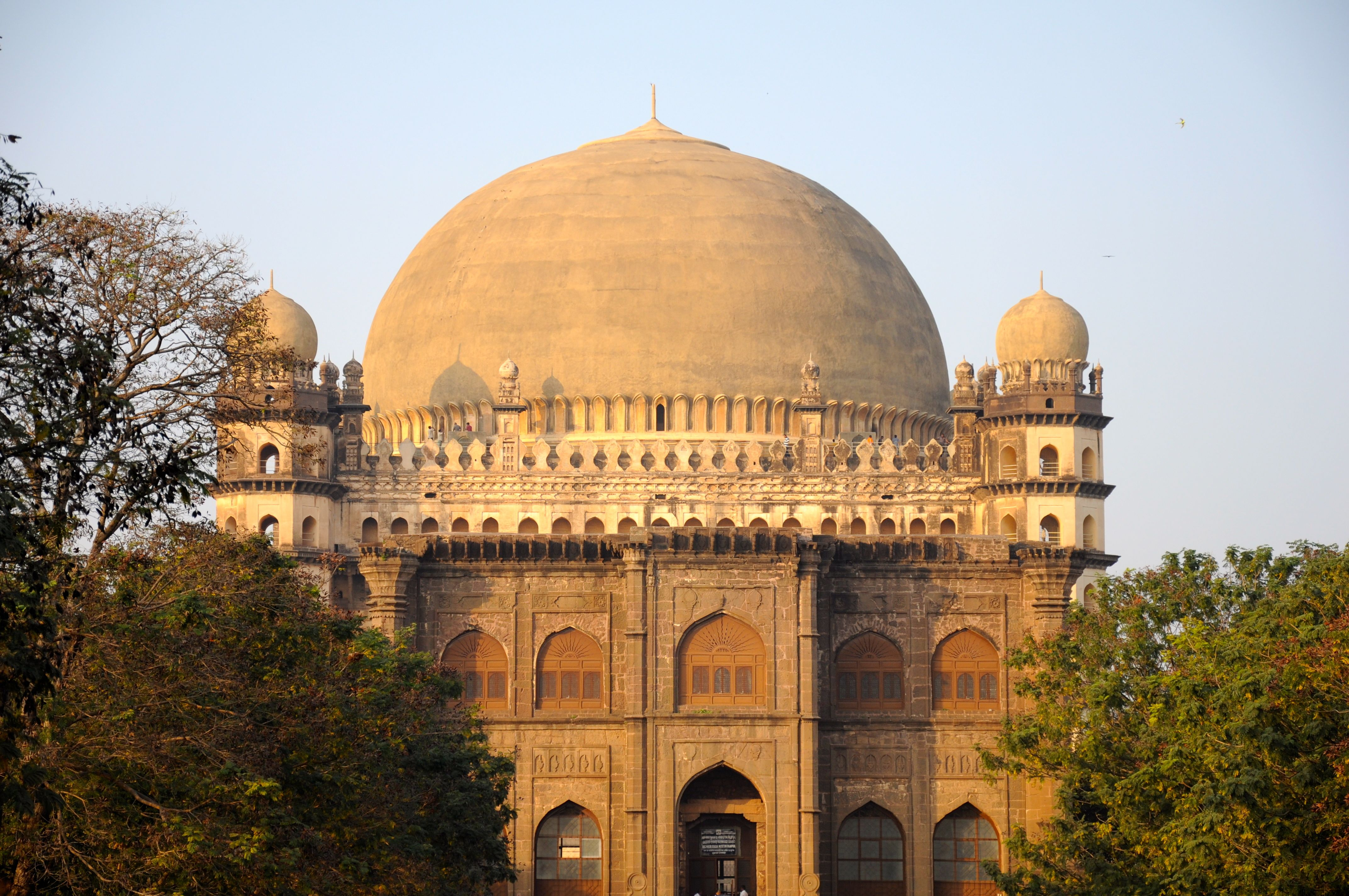
Exterior view of the dome

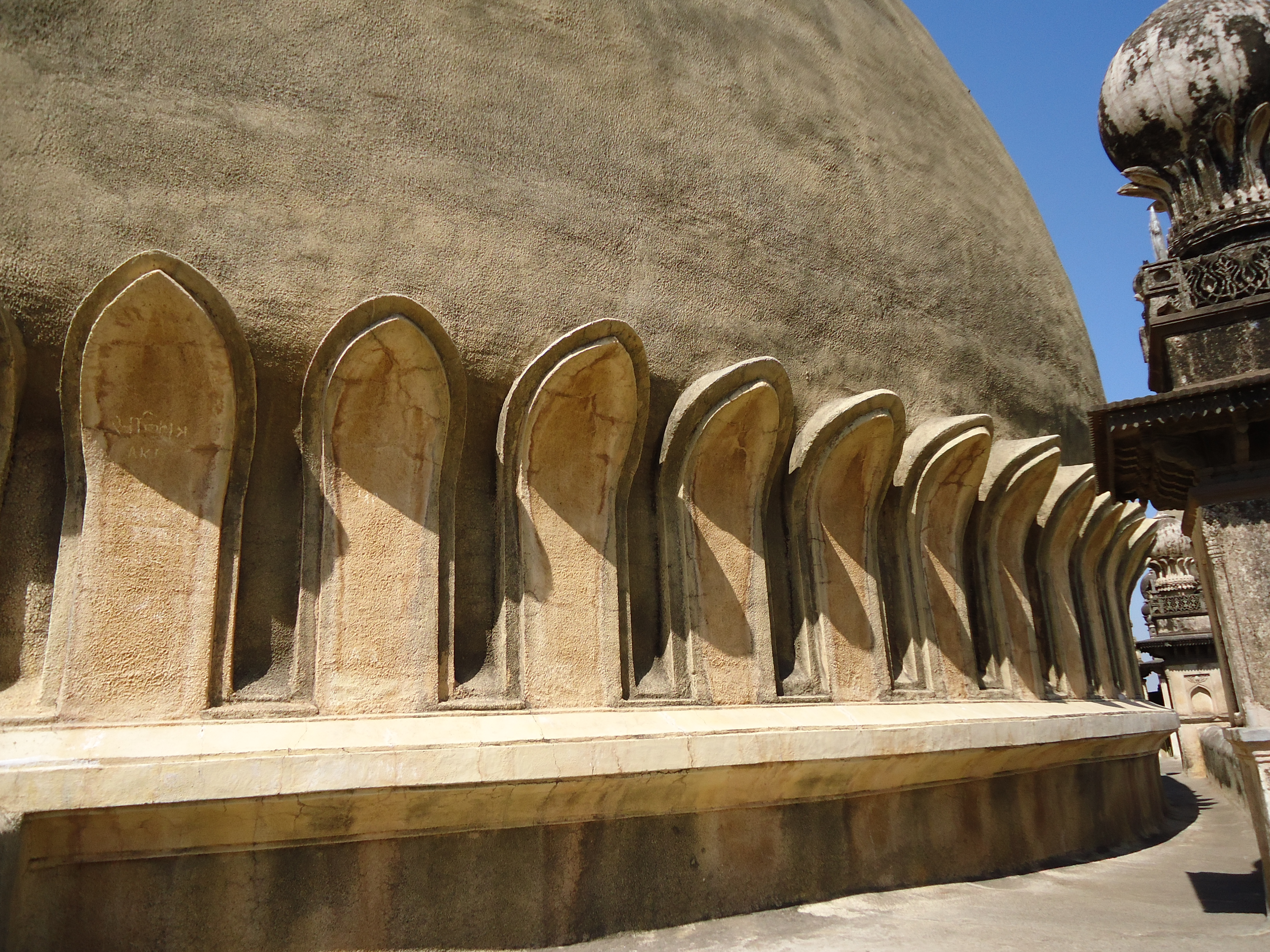
Leaves at the base of the dome

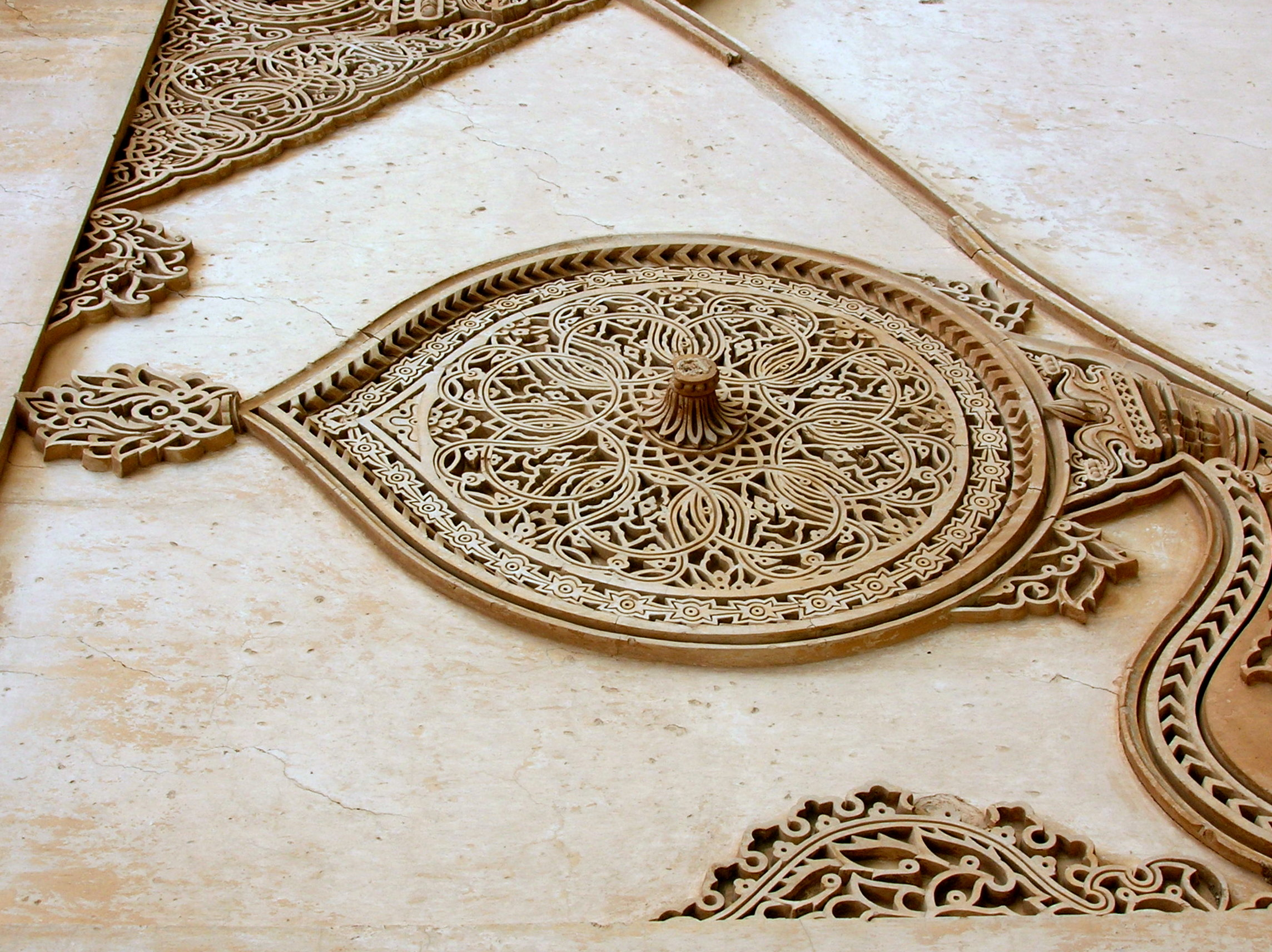
Decorative carvings

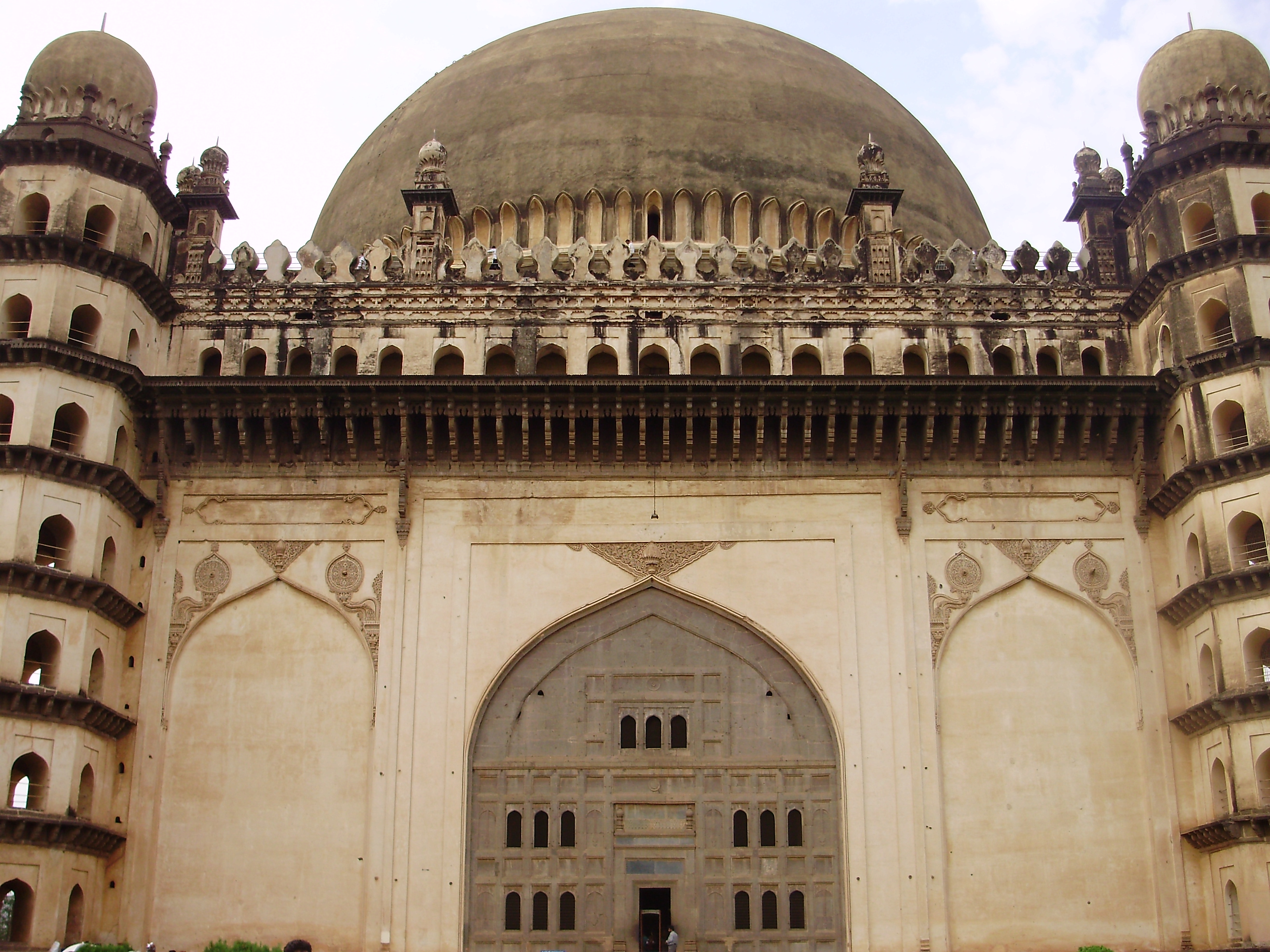
Chhajja above the west facade

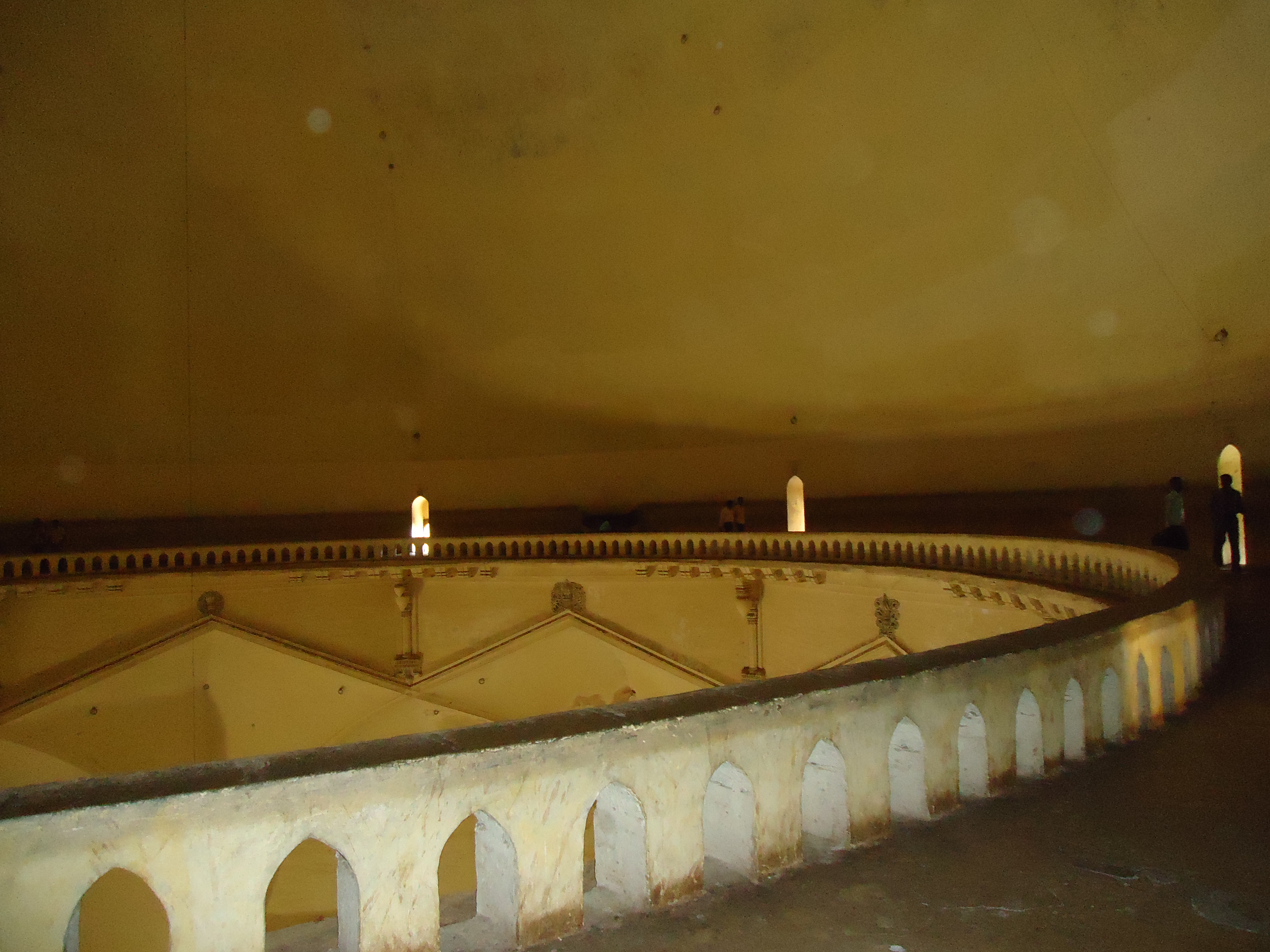
Whispering gallery

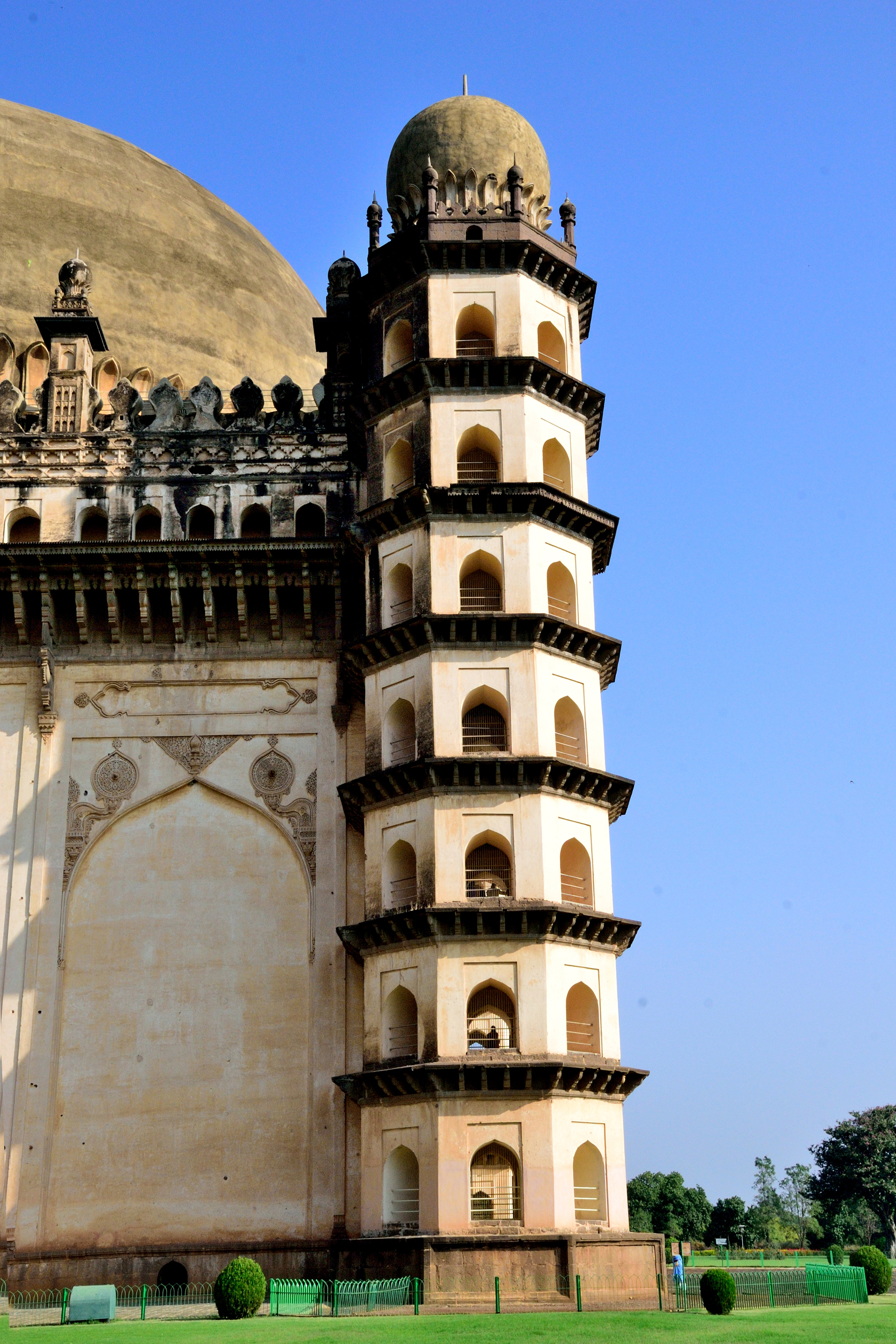
Minaret

“Whether one stands thrilled before its noble mass or humbled under the vast void of its vaulted roof, one cannot fail to be impressed by the gifted imagination which conceived this great monument, and to marvel at the supreme genius which enabled it to be so splendidly realised.”

— Percy Brown, Indian Architecture (The Islamic Period) (1942)

The Gol Gumbaz has been described as one of the most ambitious architectural achievements of the Adil Shahi dynasty. At the time of Mohammed Adil Shah's death, it was the most technically advanced domed structure to have been erected in the Deccan, and one of the largest single-chamber structures in the world. Architectural historian Elizabeth Merklinger suggests that the size of the Gol Gumbaz's central dome was an attempt to assert the stature of the Adil Shahi dynasty, in light of its conflict with and subsequent absorption by the Mughal Empire. The mausoleum was chiefly constructed of brown basalt mined from local quarries, and decorated with gilded plaster.

The syncretic architectural style of the Gol Gumbaz combines elements from several sources, and is primarily characterized by Persian and Central Asian design features. The profile of the central dome is largely Persian in derivation, while several of the mausoleum's structural elements draw inspiration from Egyptian, Byzantine and Ottoman architectural styles. Art historian Sara Mondini notes that multiple exterior decorations feature elements of Hindu architecture, including the large chhajjas and support brackets above the central arch on each façade, and were likely built by local craftsmen.

=== Plan and exterior ===
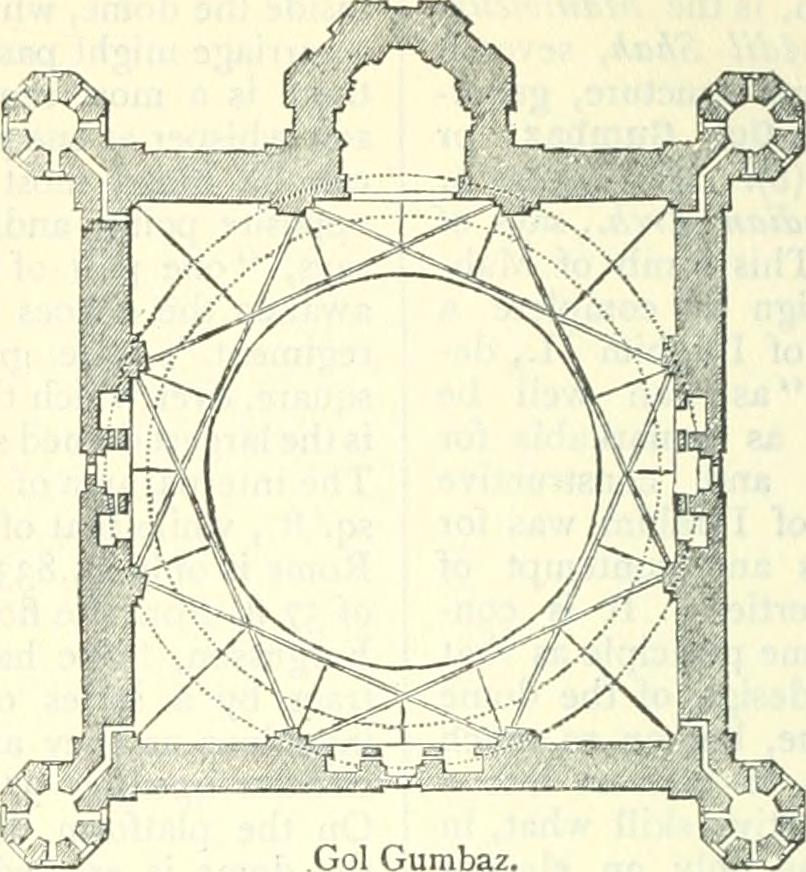
Plan of the Gol Gumbaz

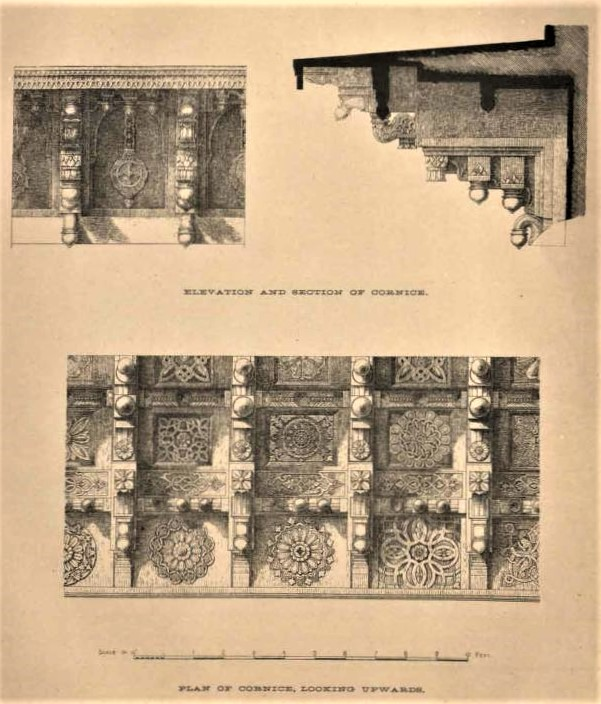
Illustrations depicting the elevation, cornice and the cornice's plan from ceiling view of Gol Gumbaz Mosque

Despite the grand nature of the monument, the plan of the Gol Gumbaz is simple. The total width of the mausoleum, including the minarets at each corner, is 205 ft (62 m), and is topped by a hemispherical dome approximately 144 ft (44 m) in diameter. Domed octagonal towers, each divided into seven floors and topped by a bulbous dome, line the four corners of the cube. The levels of the towers are marked by arcades and contain staircases within.

The walls of the structure are built of dark grey basalt and decorated plaster. Each side wall of the cube bears three blind arches; the spandrels of the arches contain medallion motifs, and the central arch on each side wall is filled with a stone screen containing doorways and windows. Within each wall is a stairway leading from the ground floor of the mausoleum to the roof. A large cornice projects 11.5 ft (3.5 m) from each wall of the building, and is supported by corbels. Atop the cornices are rows of small arches, which are topped by large merlons. Decorative leaves surround the base of the mausoleum's dome, hiding the joint between the dome and its drum.

=== Interior ===
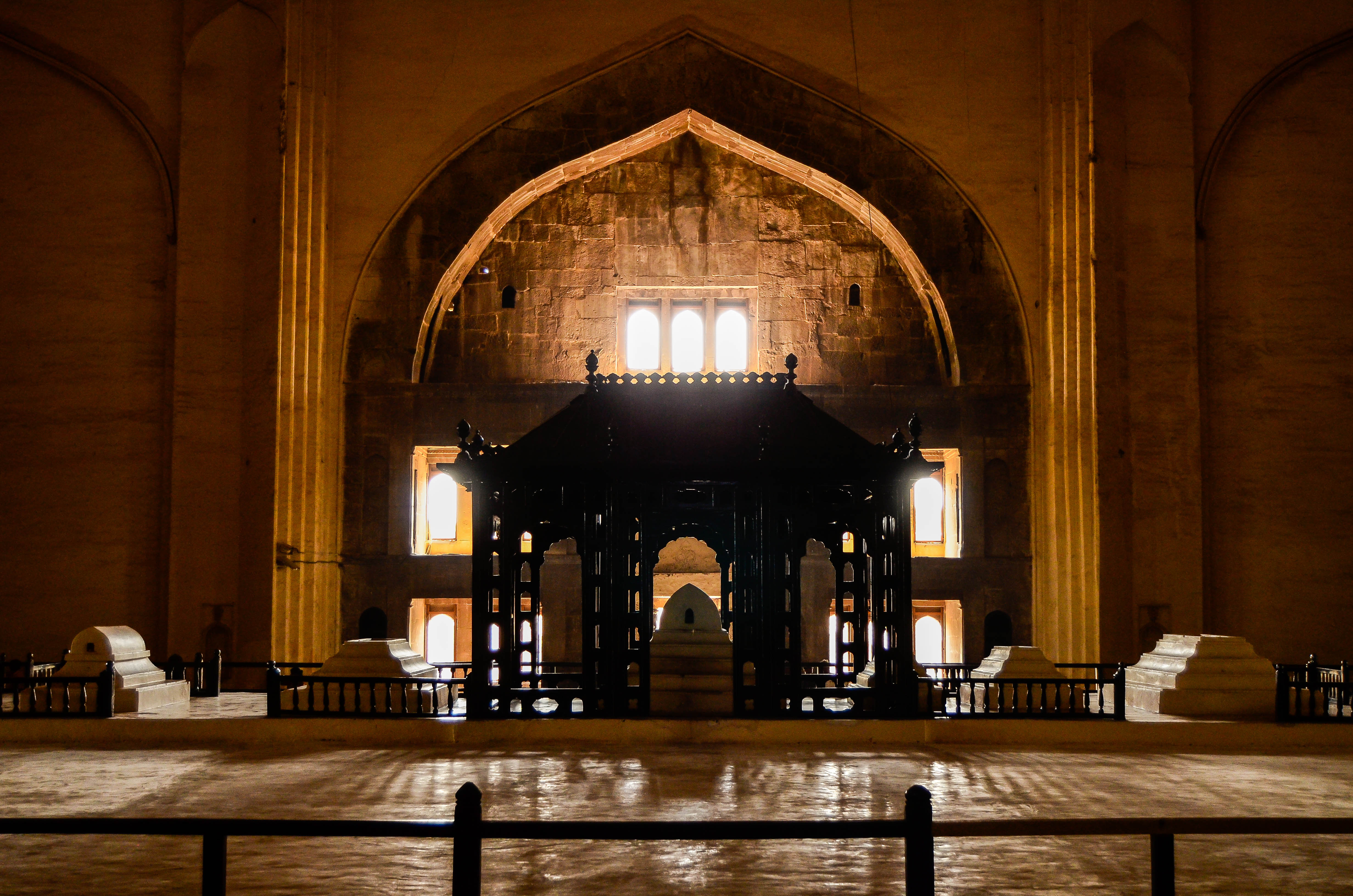
Cenotaphs in the mausoleum.

The interior hall is a huge single chamber, approximately 135.5 ft (41.3 m) across and 178 ft (54 m) in height from the floor to the top of the dome. In the center of the chamber floor is a raised platform bearing the six cenotaphs of Mohammed Adil Shah, his younger wife Arus Bibi, his older wife, his favorite mistress Rhamba, his daughter, and his grandson. The cenotaphs mark the location of the actual tombs, which are found in a crypt underneath the main hall accessible by a staircase beneath the western entrance of the mausoleum. Though typical of Indian Muslim tombs, this is the only instance of such practice in Adil Shahi architecture. Mohammad Adil Shah's cenotaph is covered by a wooden canopy, speculated to be a later addition. A half-octagonal room, constructed during the reign of Mohammed's son Ali Adil Shah II for unknown purposes, is attached to the north facade of the building.

=== Dome ===
At the time of its construction, the Gol Gumbaz boasted the largest dome in the Islamic world. Its external diameter is 44 m (144 ft) and its internal diameter is approximately 38 m (125 ft). The dome is 9 ft (2.7 m) thick at its apex and widens to a thickness of 10 ft (3.0 m) at its base, and is made of bricks of varying size cemented with layers of lime mortar. It has six small openings in its base as well as a flat section at its crown. Unlike similarly-sized domes found in Europe, such as those atop the Pantheon in Rome or St. Paul's Cathedral in London, the central dome of the Gol Gumbaz does not make use of metal tension rings. The dome rests on a circular base and is internally supported by interlocking pendentives, formed from eight intersecting arches that arise from the interior hall. The arches form two intersecting squares spanning the diameter of the dome, which directly rests upon the pointed crowns of the arches. Similar vaulting is found, though on a smaller scale, in the Jama Masjid of Bijapur and the Ibrahim Rauza. The conceptual origin of the Gol Gumbaz's pendentive support system is generally attributed to Central Asia, from where it likely spread to the Deccan via Persia during the 14th and 15th centuries. Outside of Bijapur, such pendentives are unknown in South Asian architecture, and were not employed by the Mughals or other Islamic dynasties in northern India. Further use of pendentive support systems in the royal buildings of the Deccan largely died out by the 17th century.

==== Whispering gallery ====
Around the base of the dome is a gallery, accessible by eight doorways leading into the dome from the roof of the mausoleum. It is known as the 'whispering gallery' due to its acoustic properties; a whisper or faint sound is audible to a listener with an ear held to the wall at any other point around the gallery, due to the sound waves reflecting off the inner walls of the dome. On October 24, 1945, S.S. Reuben, an assistant professor at the Sir J. J. School of Art in Bombay, observed the gallery's unique acoustics by conducting a series of experiments. He noted that the sounds from dropping a coin, tearing a piece of paper, or lighting a match at one end of the gallery were clearly audible at the other end of the gallery, at a distance of approximately 124 ft (38 m). He also found that two people could clearly communicate via whispers when sitting at opposite extremes of the gallery. Reuben further observed that a sharp percussive sound, such as a handclap, produced as many as 14 distinct echoes within the gallery.

== Attractions ==
The Gol Gumbaz is located in the center of a large walled complex alongside other historical buildings, including a mosque, a naqqar khana (drum house), and a dharamshala (rest house).

=== Gol Gumbaz Archaeological Museum ===
A 17th century Persian inscription in the museum

Cannon balls from the Bijapur Fort

The Gol Gumbaz Archaeological Museum was founded in the year 1892 at the Anand Mahal in Bijapur, and is one of the oldest museums in India. In 1912, the museum was shifted to the naqqar khana directly south of the Gol Gumbaz by British officials, and today serves as the main entrance into the complex. The two-story rectangular building was originally constructed of brown sandstone by Mohammed Adil Shah in 1631 with the purpose of welcoming royal guests, but was left unfinished. The museum houses eight galleries and displays a collection of over 1,600 artifacts dating from the 6th to 18th centuries, including inscriptions, royal heirlooms, and other artifacts of historical importance. The first floor of the building contains several exhibits from the Chalukya and Vijayanagara dynasties, including the Mahakuta Pillar constructed by the Chalukya king Mangalesha in the 7th century, a 16th century granite sculpture of the Vijayangara king Rama Raya, and multiple Kannada inscriptions dating from the 12th and 13th centuries. The second floor displays multiple artifacts of the Sultanate of Bijapur, including the sword of Adil Shahi general Afzal Khan, several calligraphic copies of the Quran, and the sultan's personal collection of celadon glassware imported from the imperial Ming dynasty.

On January 5, 2024, the museum received a bomb threat via email. Following an investigation by the local police, the threat was deemed to be a hoax.

=== Hashimpeer Dargah ===
The dargah of Sufi saint Hashim Peer Dastagir was constructed by Mohammed Adil Shah in 1649, and is located to the west of the Gol Gumbaz. Mohammed was one of Hashim Peer's disciples; historian Sara Mondini notes the proximity of the Gol Gumbaz to Hashim Peer's shrine as "tangible evidence of the deep attachment of the sovereign to the Sufi component of the city". The shrine, which contains the tombs of Hashim Peer and his two wives, is managed by his descendant Murtaza Hussain Hashmi, and attracts a large number of Hindu and Muslim devotees during the urs (death anniversary) of the saint on the ninth day of Ramadan.

The Gol Gumbaz mosque, with Hashim Peer's dargah visible in the background

=== Gol Gumbaz Mosque ===
An unnamed mosque is located directly to the west of the Gol Gumbaz. Described as a "well-proportioned and elegant building" by archaeologist Henry Cousens in 1916, the building was used as a travelers' bungalow for several years following its completion at an unknown date. It features a rectangular plan with a small central dome and two slender ornamental minarets at each end of the structure. Cousens noted that the overhanging chhajja above the façade was significantly damaged, and observed that the mosque was no longer in use by the local populace due to its relatively poor and unsafe condition.

=== Ornamental garden ===
The Gol Gumbaz is surrounded by a large Persian-style garden, also known as a charbagh, with a quadrilateral layout. The garden serves as a habitat for wild peacocks, which have been observed in significant numbers on the western side of the monument during the morning and evening hours.

== Tourism ==
Visitors at the Gol Gumbaz entrance

The Gol Gumbaz is the most-visited tourist attraction in the city of Bijapur, and attracts a large number of sight-seers in the winter months. Over 700,000 visitors, including 3,000 foreign nationals, visited the Gol Gumbaz in the 2006-07 financial year. The monument typically hosts an average of 1,500–2,000 daily visitors, and over 5,000 daily visitors during December and January. During the last week of 2022, approximately 40,000 tourists visited the monument, including 6,500 on Christmas.

The 2020 COVID-19 pandemic caused a significant decline in tourist traffic and revenue at the Gol Gumbaz. The monument was closed to visitors in March of that year, resulting in a loss of Rs. 2 lakh in tourism revenue. The Archaeological Survey of India (ASI) reopened the monument to tourists later in the year, but enforced a daily cap of 2,000 visitors due to lingering COVID-19 concerns. In the summer of 2026, the Gol Gumbaz saw another large drop in visitors due to a heat wave that pushed daily temperatures in Bijapur above 40 °C. The Government of Karnataka has launched multiple projects to increase tourist traffic to the Gol Gumbaz, including the installation of an elevator to carry visitors to the tomb's whispering gallery, the hiring of several multilingual tour guides, and the provision of battery-operated vehicles to transport tourists across the mausoleum grounds. In 2024, the ASI installed a series of solar-powered lights to illuminate the monument, which were inaugurated by Bijapur district minister M.B. Patil.

== Restoration ==
In 2016, the Gol Gumbaz was 'adopted' by the State Trading Corporation of India, a government-owned international trading company, in a public-private partnership. A subsequent news release published by the Press Information Bureau described the importance of the partnership for "conservation, restoration, and environmental development" of the monument.

In 2018, several heritage activists in North Karnataka raised concerns over the deteriorating condition of the Gol Gumbaz. Multiple cracks were observed in the mausoleum's dome, walls and corner minarets due to rainwater seepage, and officials of the Archaeological Survey of India (ASI) were criticized for taking inadequate measures to maintain and repair the monument. In April 2019, ASI official Mounesh Kurvatti submitted a request for Rs. 1 crore in government funding to restore the mausoleum's structural integrity. In August 2021, a portion of the cornice support bracket on the eastern side of the building collapsed during a heavy rainstorm. Following the incident, an ASI official denied allegations of negligent maintenance, and ordered the conduction of a "detailed survey" to assess the extent of the damage and identify necessary repairs.

In October 2018, reports emerged of tourists defacing the inner walls of the mausoleum with red stains, caused by chewing and spitting betel nut and gutka. The ASI responded by stationing additional officials within the monument and covering the stains on the walls with layers of paint.

== Seismic hazards ==
The Gol Gumbaz has been the subject of multiple seismic hazard studies, aimed at assessing the mausoleum's vulnerability to seismic loads generated by earthquakes in the Deccan Plateau. Several elements of the mausoleum's architecture, including the rigid dome supported by vertical arches, inelastic mortar-filled joints, and lack of infill walls, make the tomb vulnerable to lateral stresses generated during earthquakes. The four corner minarets of the monument are also susceptible to damage from tremors due to their height and relatively weak anchoring points to the base of the mausoleum. A 2024 study identified the overhanging chhajjas projecting outwards from each wall of the tomb as "highly vulnerable to seismic activity", due to the heavy wear and tear observed on the cornice support brackets. The Gol Gumbaz is primarily made of basalt, which handles compressive forces well but is vulnerable to geological tension stresses due to its compact nature.

The city of Bijapur does not lie near any active fault lines; however, the Deccan plateau has been identified as a region of "high-stress concentration" within the Indian plate, and numerous intraplate earthquakes have been recorded in the area due to the absorption of water by limestone subsoil during the monsoon season. The 1993 Latur earthquake, which measured 6.4 on the moment magnitude scale, caused multiple radial and vertical cracks to appear on the central dome and walls of the Gol Gumbaz. A computational probabilistic seismic hazard analysis of the monument conducted by IIT Madras in 2017 concluded that the controlling scenario earthquake (a hypothetical reference earthquake that the structure would be expected to withstand) of the surrounding area would have an intensity of 4.8–6.3 on the moment magnitute scale.

== In popular culture ==

=== Art and literature ===
In 1833, British watercolor artist Samuel Prout's Tomb of Mahomed Shah, based on a series of sketches by English naval officer Robert Elliot, was published as an engraving in Fisher's Drawing Room Scrap Book. Accompanying the engraving is a poetical illustration authored by English poet Letitia Elizabeth Landon, reflecting on an inscription within the tomb describing the Sultan's "happy end".

=== Film and media ===
Several scenes from the 2016 Kannada-language film Nanna Ninna Prema Kathe were shot in and around the Gol Gumbaz, Ibrahim Rauza, and other historical sites in North Karnataka. The Gol Gumbaz was also featured in the second season of the 2025 documentary television series India: Marvels and Mysteries, narrated by Scottish historian William Dalrymple.

== Gallery ==
Path to entrance

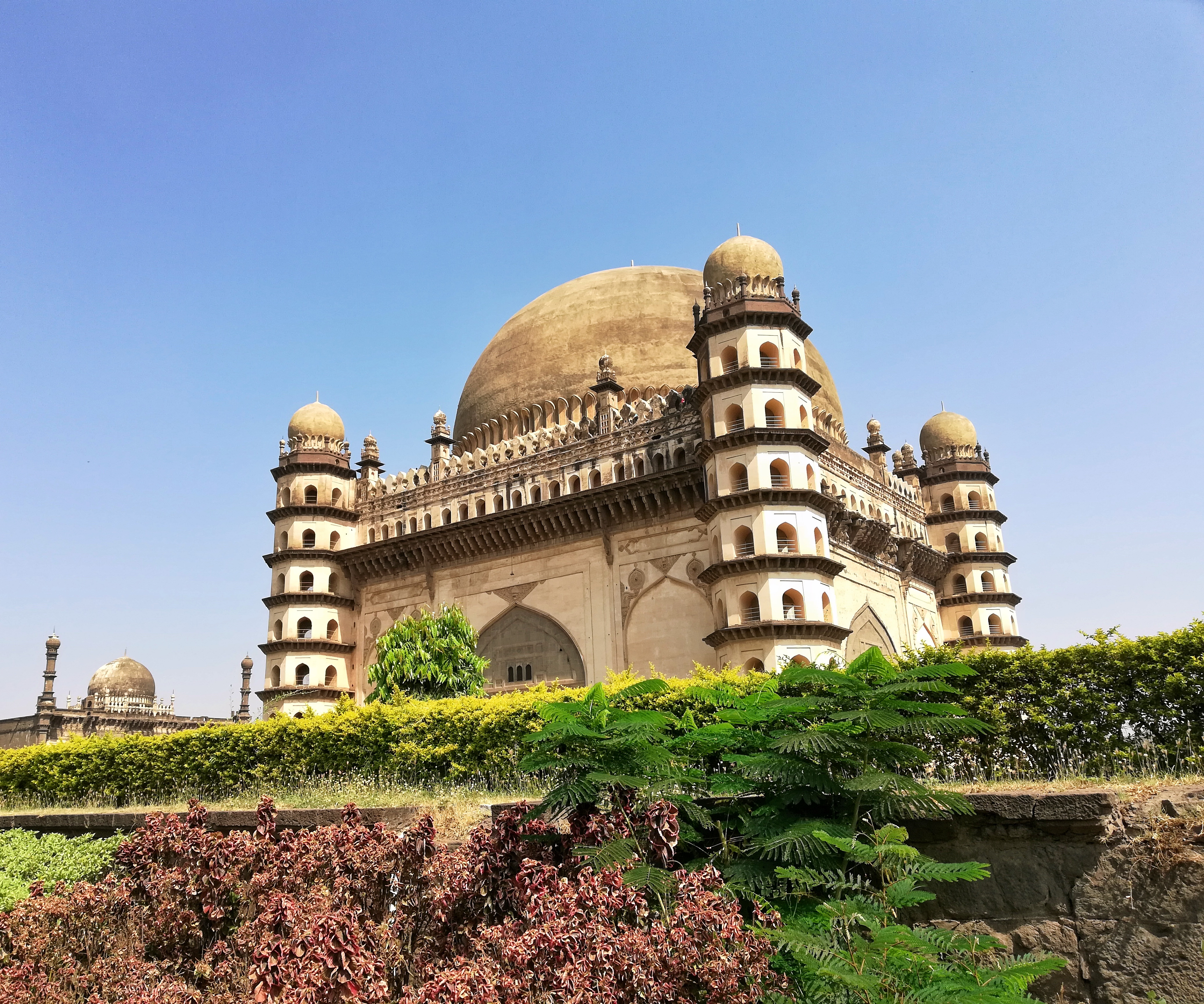
Tomb viewed from the gardens

Side profile of minaret

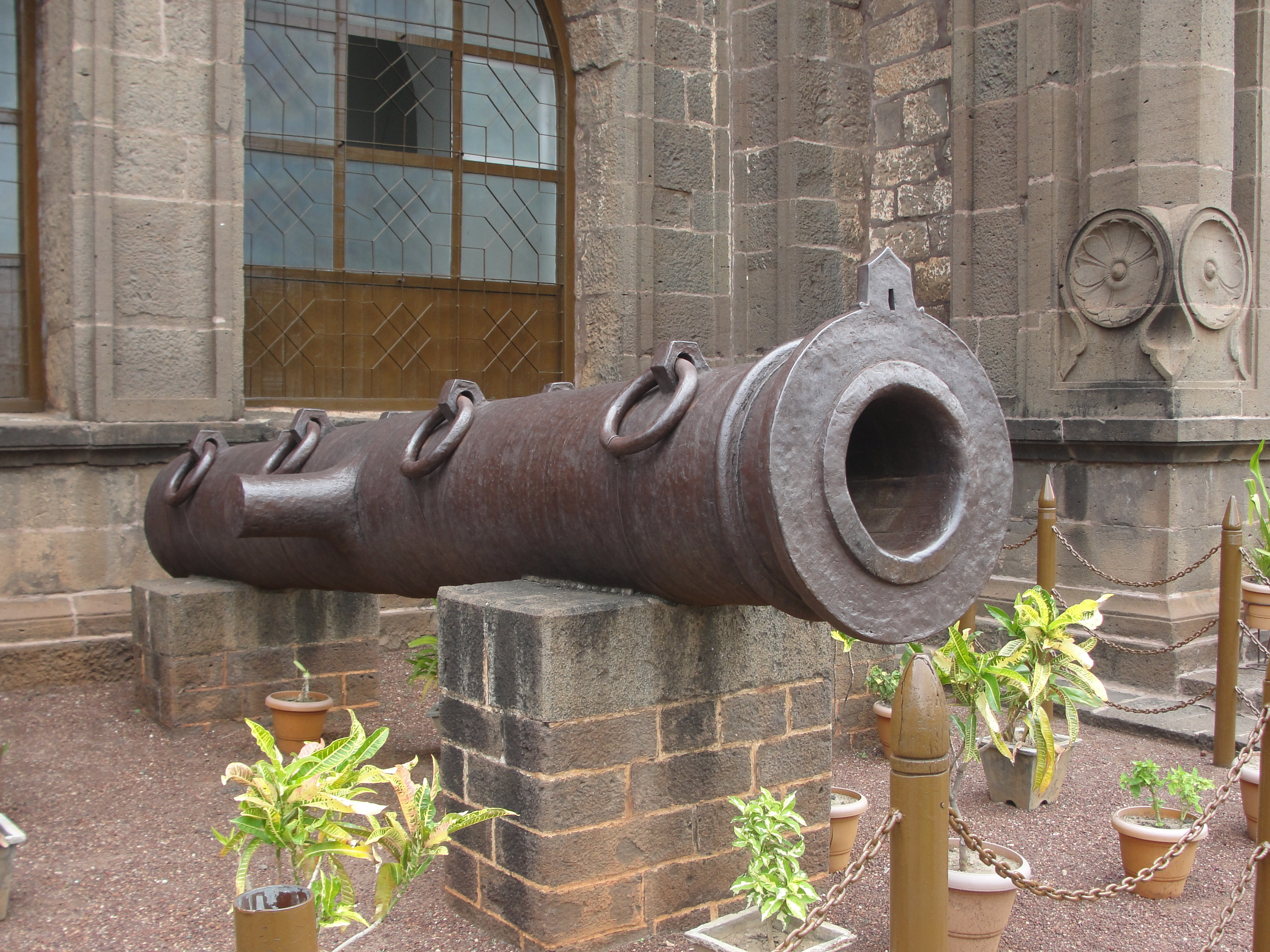
Cannon displayed in front of Gol Gumbaz museum

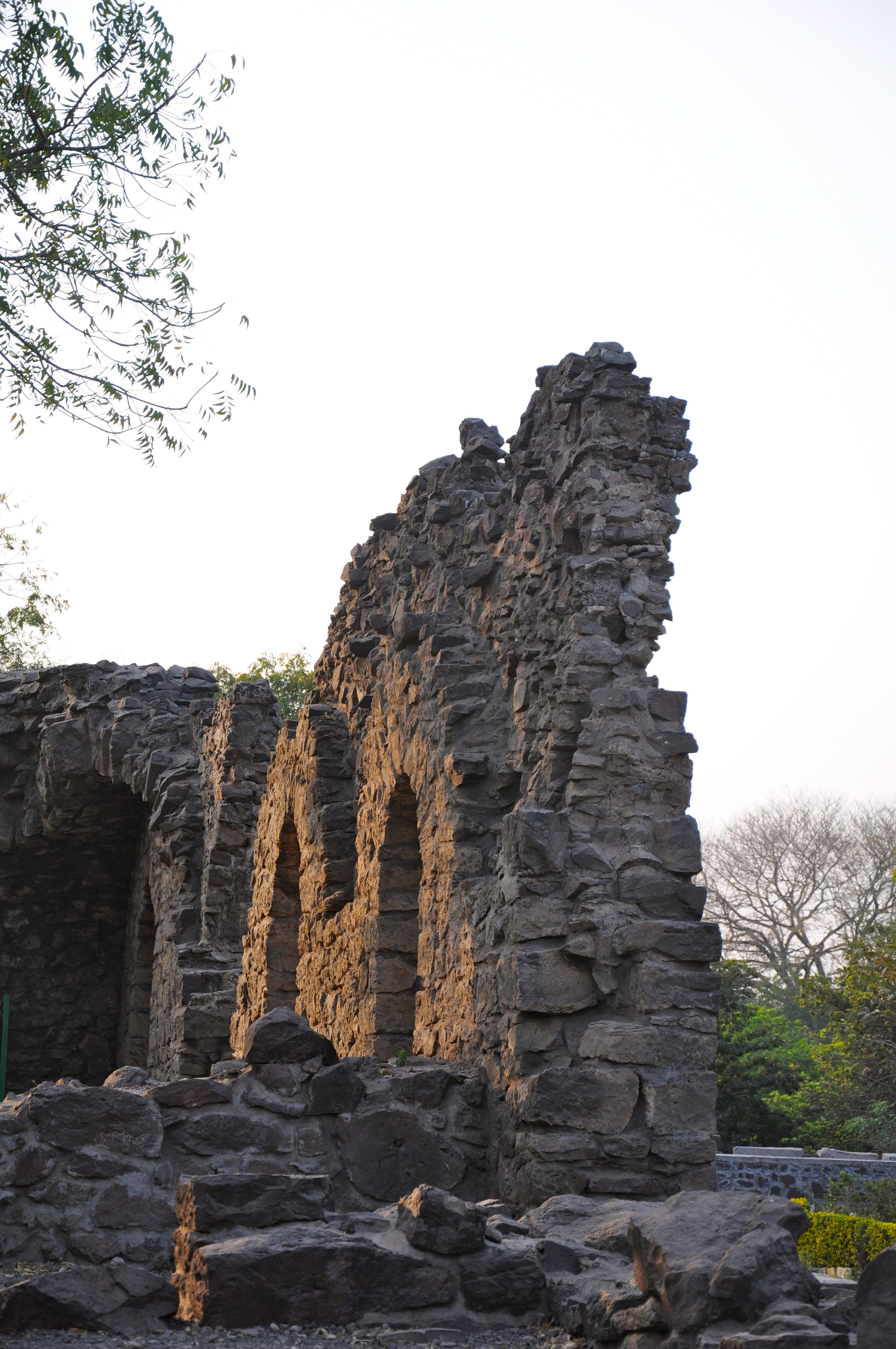
Ruins near the entrance

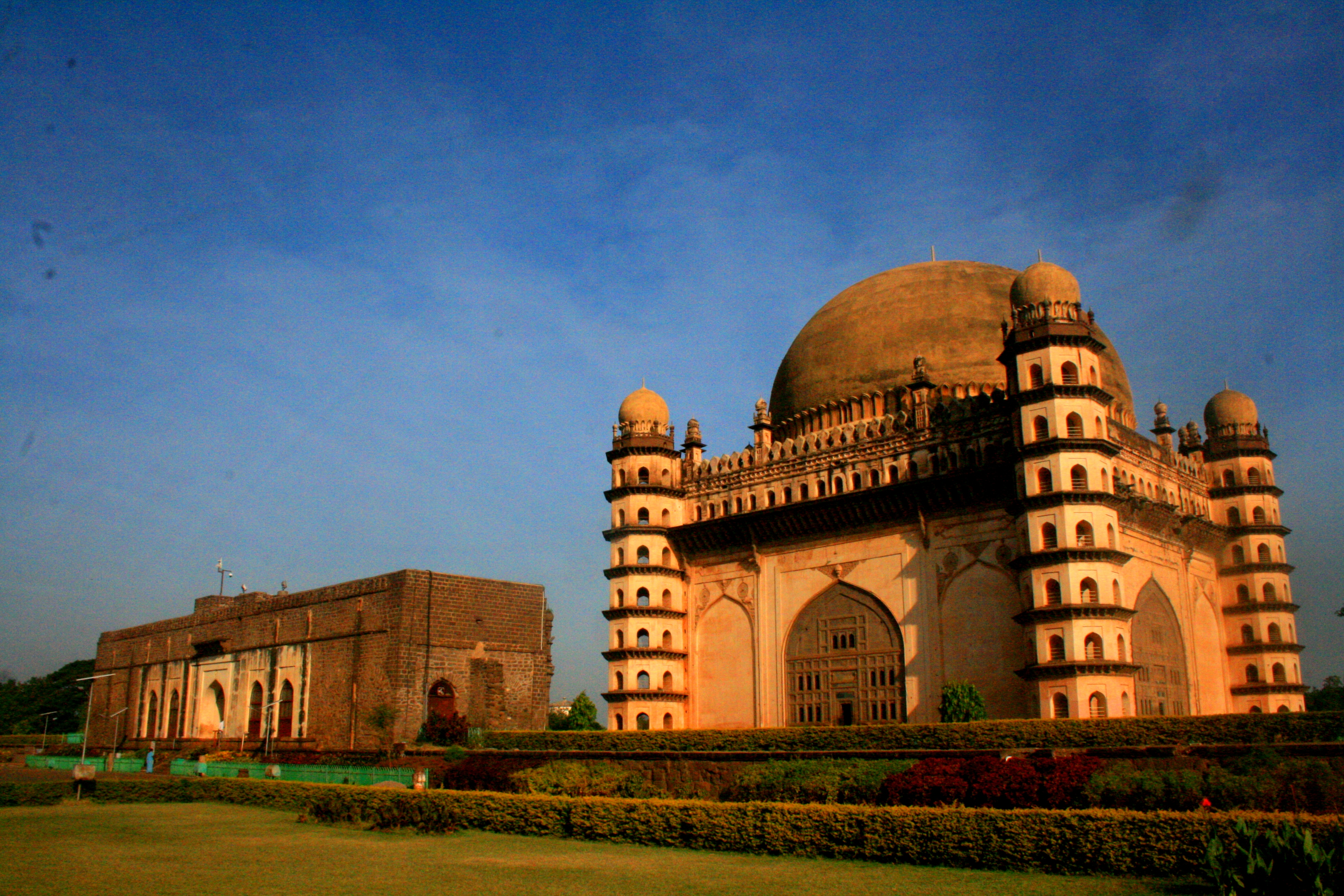
View at sunset

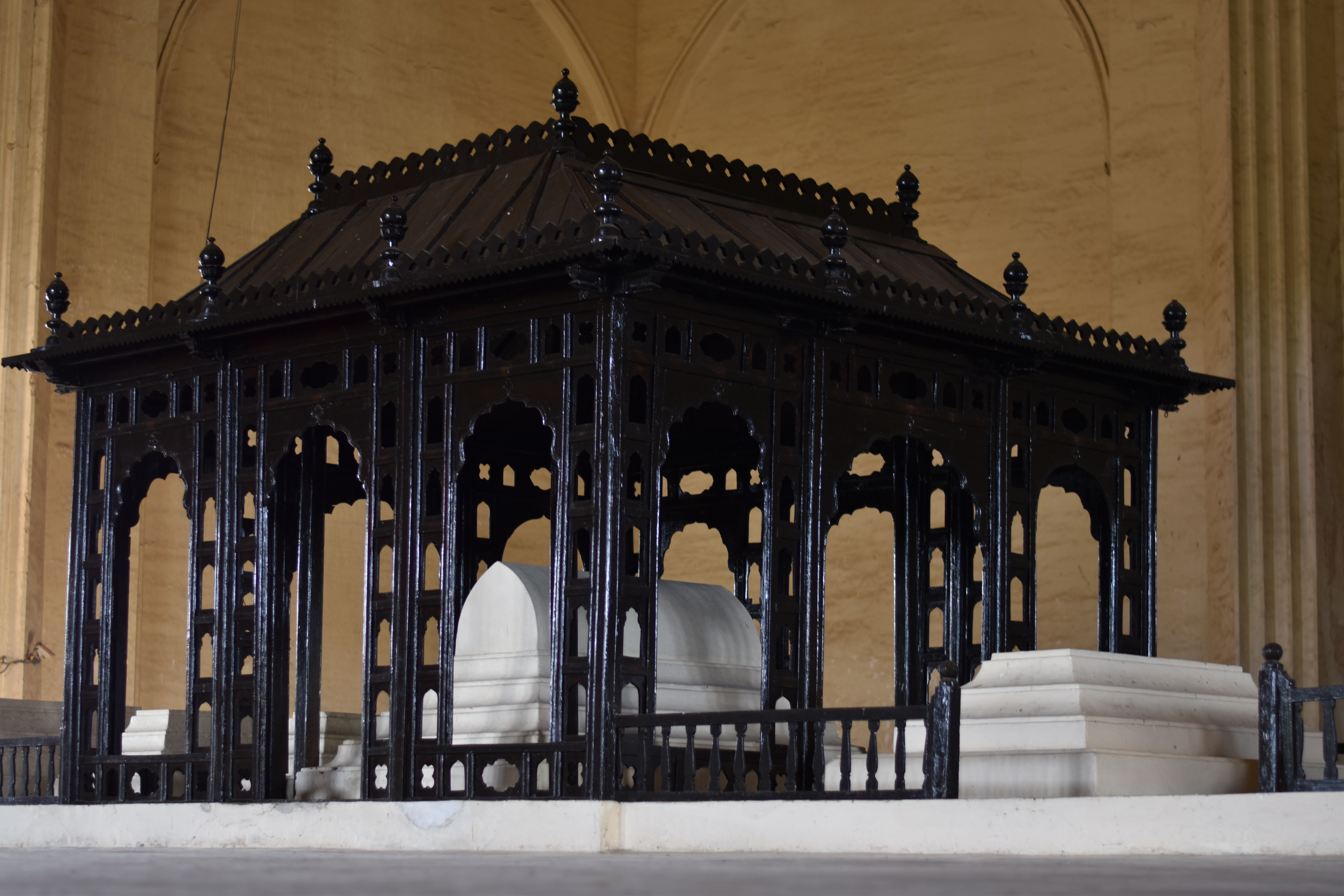
Cenotaph of Mohammed Adil Shah

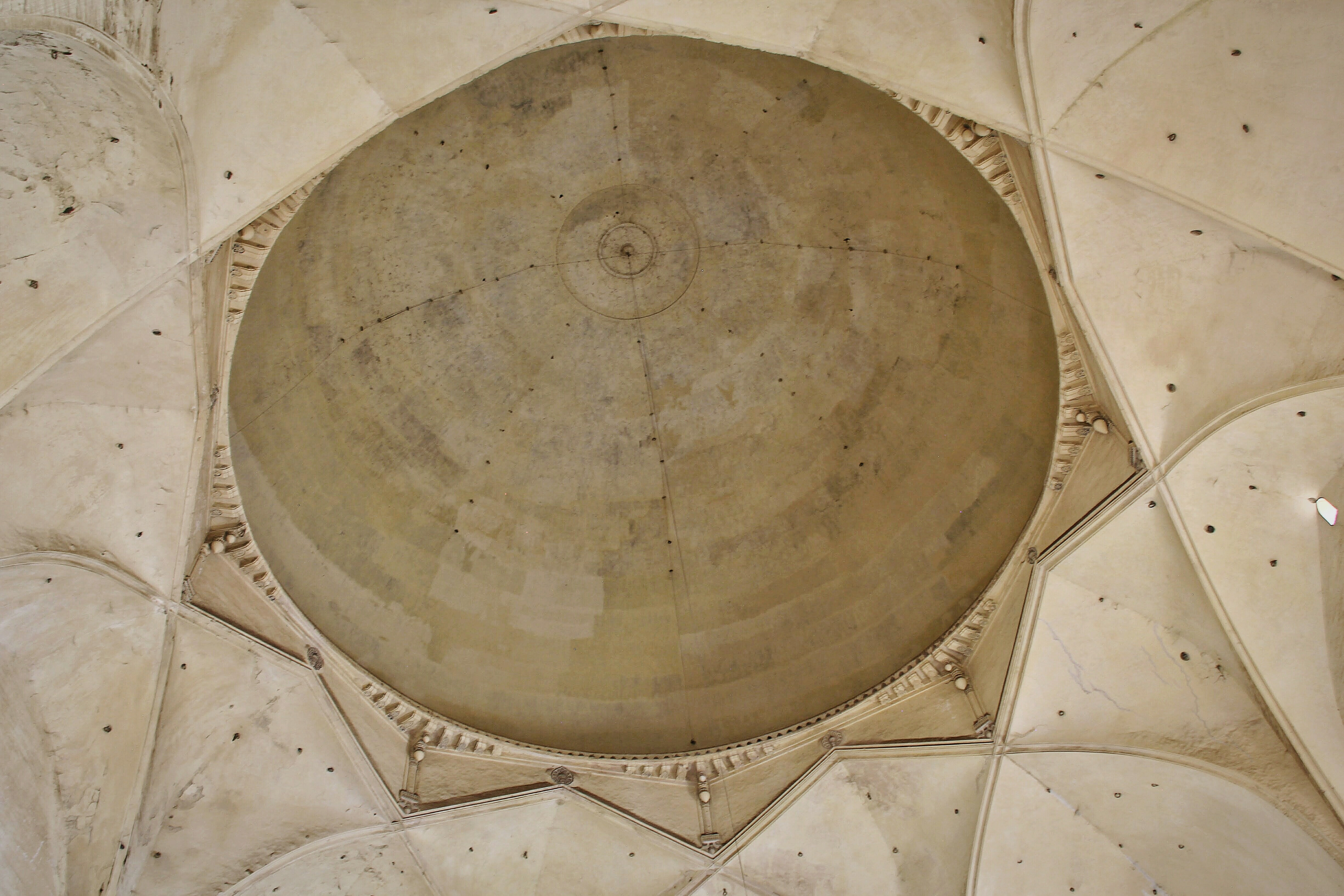
Interior view of dome

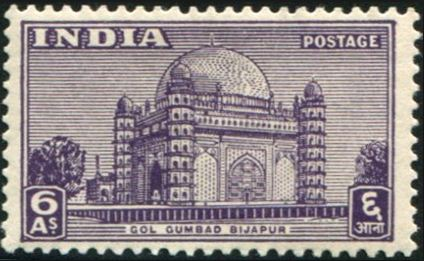
1949 postage stamp

Entrance signboard

== See also ==
- Architecture of India
- List of Monuments of National Importance in Bagalkot and Bijapur district, Karnataka
- Adil Shahi dynasty
- Bijapur Fort
- Jod Gumbaz
- Tomb of Jahan Begum
- Bara Kaman
- Gagan Mahal
- Malik-E-Maidan
- Nav Gumbaz

== Bibliography ==
- Michell, George (1999). Architecture and Art of the Deccan Sultanates. Mark Zebrowski. Cambridge University Press. ISBN 9780521563215. OCLC 268771115.
- Cousens, Henry (1916). Bijapur and its Architectural Remains. Bombay: Archaeological Survey of India.
- Cousens, Henry (1923). Bijapur: The Old Capital of the Adil Shahi Kings (3rd ed.). Central Archaeological Library, New Delhi: Scottish Mission Industries Company, Ltd.
- Reuben, S.S. (20 May 1947). The Gol Gumbaz at Bijapur (PDF). Central Archaeological Library, New Delhi: Government of India, Department of Archaeology.
- Brown, Percy (1964). Indian Architecture (The Islamic Period) (4th ed.). Bombay: D.B. Taraporevala.
- Nazim, Mohammed (1936). BIJAPUR INSCRIPTIONS (PDF). Delhi: Archaeological Survey of India.
- Patil, S.G.; Menon, Arun (2 March 2018). "Probabilistic seismic hazard at the archaeological site of Gol Gumbaz in Vijayapura, south India". Journal of Earth System Science. 127 (16). doi:10.1007/s12040-018-0917-4.
- Varma, Mahesh N.; Jangid, R.S. (2006). Tension Ring in Masonry Domes (PDF). New Delhi: Structural Analysis of Historical Constructions. ISBN 9728692277.
- Mondini, Sara (5 August 2020), "The Jami Masjid Miḥrāb of Bijapur: Inscribing Turkic Identities in a Contested Space", Turkish History and Culture in India, BRILL, p. 294, doi:10.1163/9789004437364_011, ISBN 978-90-04-43736-4, S2CID 234656650
- Joshi, Manthan (21 March 2024). "Seismic Vulnerability of Bijapur's Historic Architecture". International Research Journal on Advanced Engineering and Management. 2 (3). doi:10.47392/IRJAEM.2024.0064.
- Biradar, Peerappa Bandeppa (12 December 2024). "The Gol Gumbaz: The Mausoleum of Muhammad Adil Shah" (PDF). International Journal of Creative Research Thoughts. 12 (12).
- Ashkan, Maryam; Ahmad, Yahaya (2010). "Discontinuous Double-shell Domes through Islamic eras in the Middle East and Central Asia: History, Morphology, Typologies, Geometry, and Construction" (PDF). Nexus Network Journal. 12 (2). Turin, Italy: Kim Williams Books: 287–319. doi:10.1007/s00004-010-0013-9.
- Raman, C. V. (1922). "On whispering galleries" (PDF). Bull. Indian Assoc. Cultiv. Sci. 7: 159–172. Archived from the original (PDF) on 12 January 2026 – via IAS Fellows Publications.
- Sengupta, Gautam (2012). Custodians of the Past: 150 Years of the Archaeological Survey of India (PDF). New Delhi: Silverpoint Press Pvt. Ltd. ISBN 9789350861998.
