= Architecture of the Deccan sultanates =

Islamic architecture of the Deccan Plateau, India

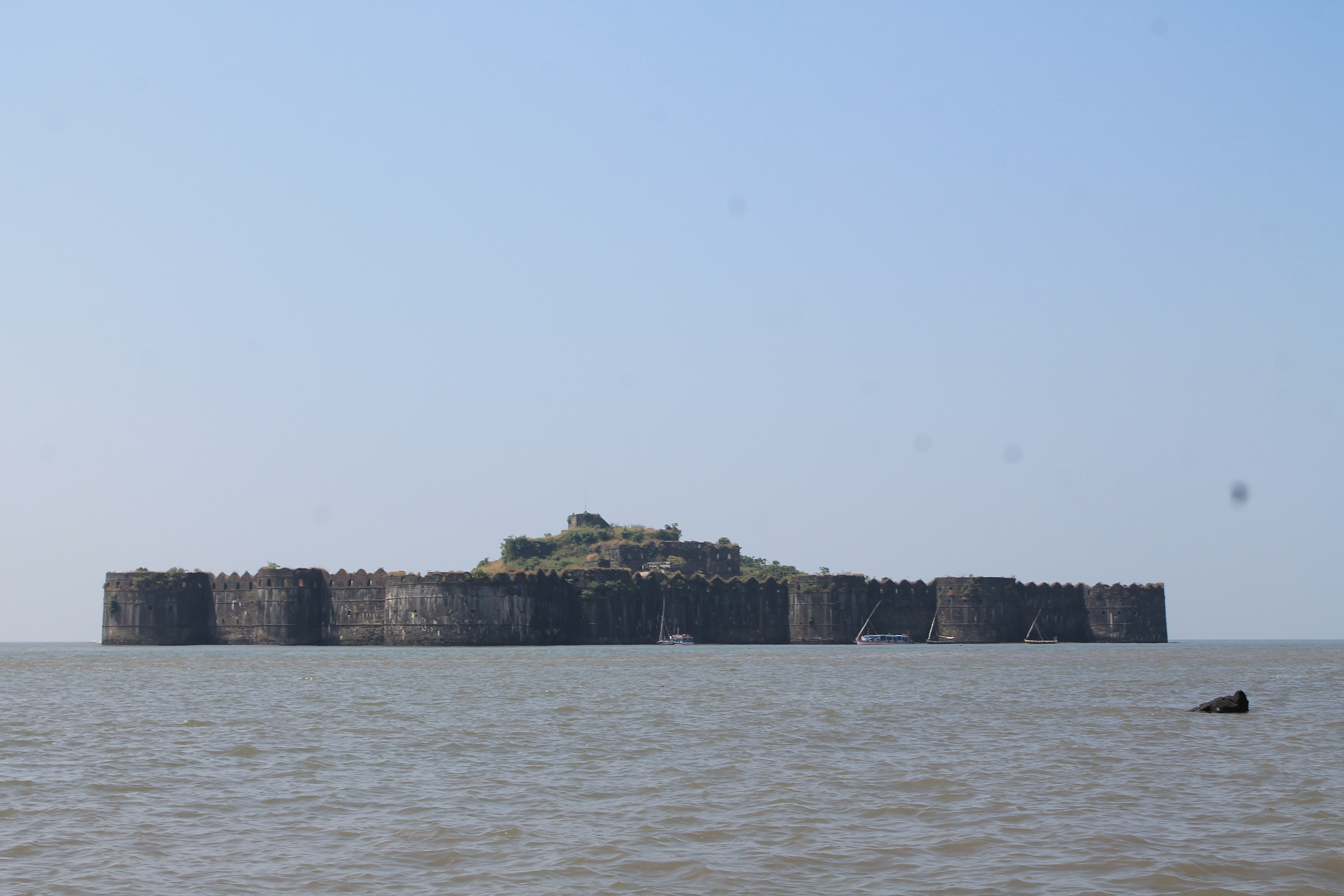
Murud-Janjira Fort built by Ahmadnagar Sultanate

The Deccan sultanates were five early modern kingdoms (Bijapur, Golkonda, Ahmadnagar, Bidar, and Berar) which ruled on the Deccan Plateau beginning in the late 15th century and lasting through the 17th century. The architecture the sultanates produced was a regional variant of Indo-Islamic architecture, influenced by the styles of the Delhi Sultanate and later Mughal architecture. Persian and Central Asian design features also feature in some structures. The sultanate styles differ greatly from those employed in Hindu temple architecture in the same areas.

The rulers of the five Deccan sultanates established numerous contributions in the arts, music, literature and architecture. The Bidar and Golconda forts demonstrate how architecture factored into the military planning of the sultanates. Apart from forts, these regimes also constructed many tombs, mosques, and madrasas. Gol Gumbaz (the tomb of Mohammed Adil Shah) was once the second largest dome in the world.

In 2014, UNESCO designated a group of buildings as tentative World Heritage Sites under the name "Monuments and Forts of the Deccan Sultanate" (despite there being multiple sultanates), which included the Bahmani and Barid Shahi Monuments at Bidar (Karnataka), the Adil Shahi Monuments at Bijapur (Karnataka), and Qutb Shahi Monuments at Hyderabad (Telangana).

== Ahmadnagar Sultanate ==
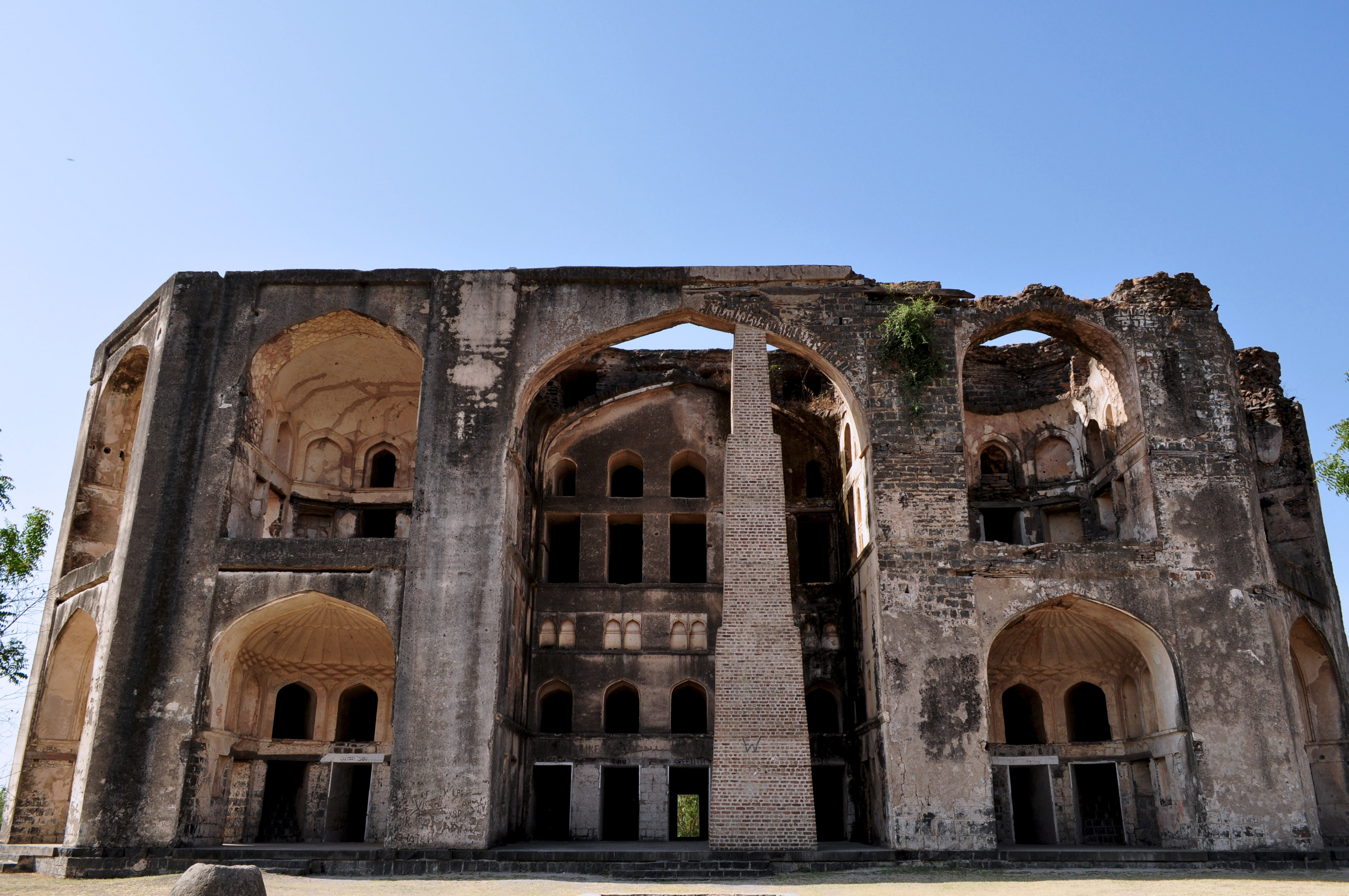
Ruins of Faria Bagh, the Palace of Nizam Shahi rulers

During the Ahmadnagar rule, multiple palaces were constructed, and their ruins lie in and around Ahmadnagar city in the present day. The Ahmadnagar also built tombs of nobles such as Salabat Khan and Changiz Khan, and saints such as Shah Sharif and Bava Bangali.

Malik Ambar is credited with the construction of the Janjira Fort in the Murud Area of present-day Maharashtra, India. After its construction in 1567 CE, the fort was essential to the Sidis' withstanding various invasion attempts by the Marathas, Mughals, and Portuguese to capture Janjira.

The Farah Bagh palace (also called Faria Bagh) is situated in Ahmednagar, Maharashtra. It was built by Nizam Shahi rulers in Ahmednagar. Farah Bagh was the centrepiece of a palatial complex completed in 1583 CE. It belonged to the royal household and Murtaza Nizam Shah often retired here to play chess with a Delhi singer he called Fateh Shah. He also built the singer a separate palace called Lakad Mahal in the garden.

== Bijapur Sultanate ==
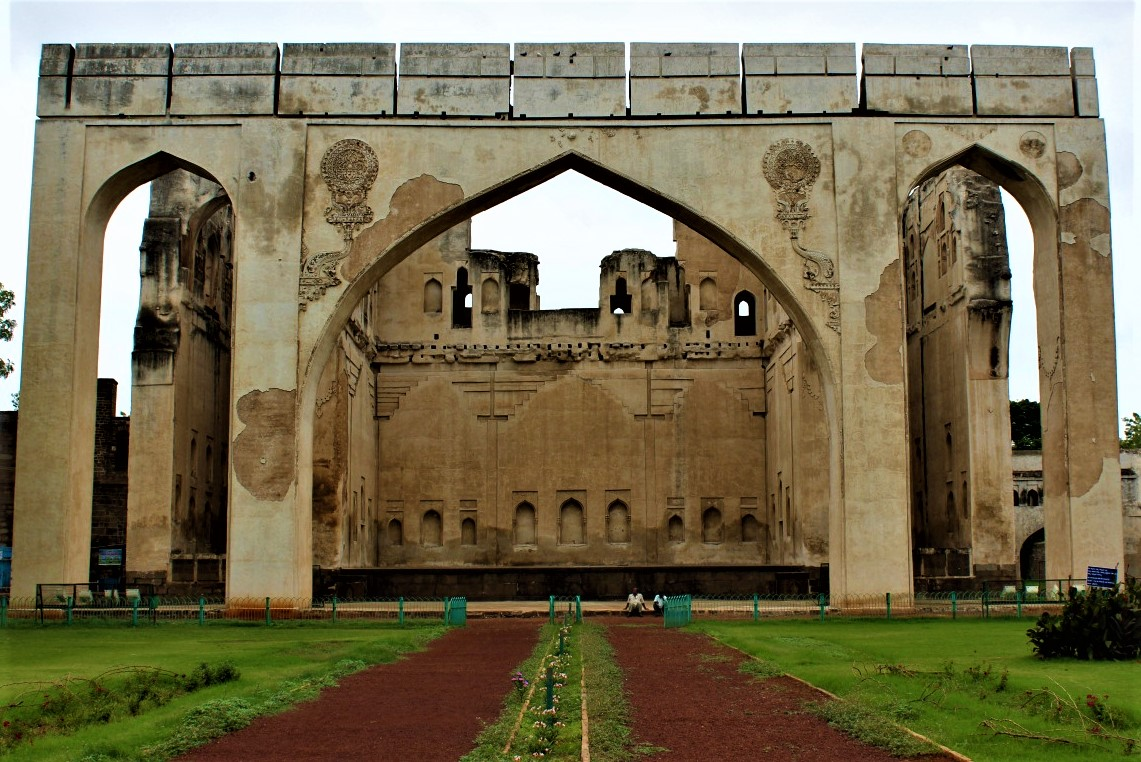
Ruins of Gagan Mahal

Prominent monuments in Bijapur include the Gagan Mahal, Gol Gumbaz, Bijapur Fort, and Ibrahim Rauza. Gol Gumbaz is the tomb of Mohammed Adil Shah and it contains the second-largest dome in the world constructed before the modern age. The external diameter of the hemispherical dome is 44 m. Ibrahim Rouza is the tomb of Ibrahim Adil Shah II and it is said to be one of the most beautiful monuments in Bijapur.

The Jami Masjid is one of the largest mosques in India having a courtyard of 11,000 square feet. Other architectural works from this period in Bijapur are the Chini Mahal, Sat Manzil, Gagan Mahal, Anand Mahal, and the Asar Mahal (built in 1646 CE).

== Golconda Sultanate ==
Golkonda fort, built by the Qutb Shahi dynasty, has a reputation as one of the most impregnable forts in India, but it is also known for its acoustic features and water management systems.

The Jami Masjid, built by Quli Qutb Mulk in 1518 CE, is a notable mosque in Golkonda. The tombs of Qutb Shahis are a mausoleum complex, a royal necropolis composed of 30 tombs of the royal family, erected between the years of 1543 and 1672 CE.

Char Minar, in central Hyderabad, was completed in 1591 CE, having four minarets with heights of 56 m. The construction of the Makkah Masjid was started in 1617 CE during the reign of Muhammad Qutb Shah, the building was finally completed in 1693.

== Sources ==
- Michell, George; Zebrowski, Mark (1999). Architecture and Art of the Deccan Sultanates (The New Cambridge History of India Vol. I:7). Cambridge: Cambridge University Press. ISBN 0-521-56321-6.
- Yazdani, Ghulam (1947). Bidar, Its History and Monuments. London: Oxford University Press.

== See also ==
- World Heritage Sites – Place of significance listed by UNESCO
