= Jama Mosque, Bijapur =

Mosque in Bijapur, Karnataka, India

Jama Mosque
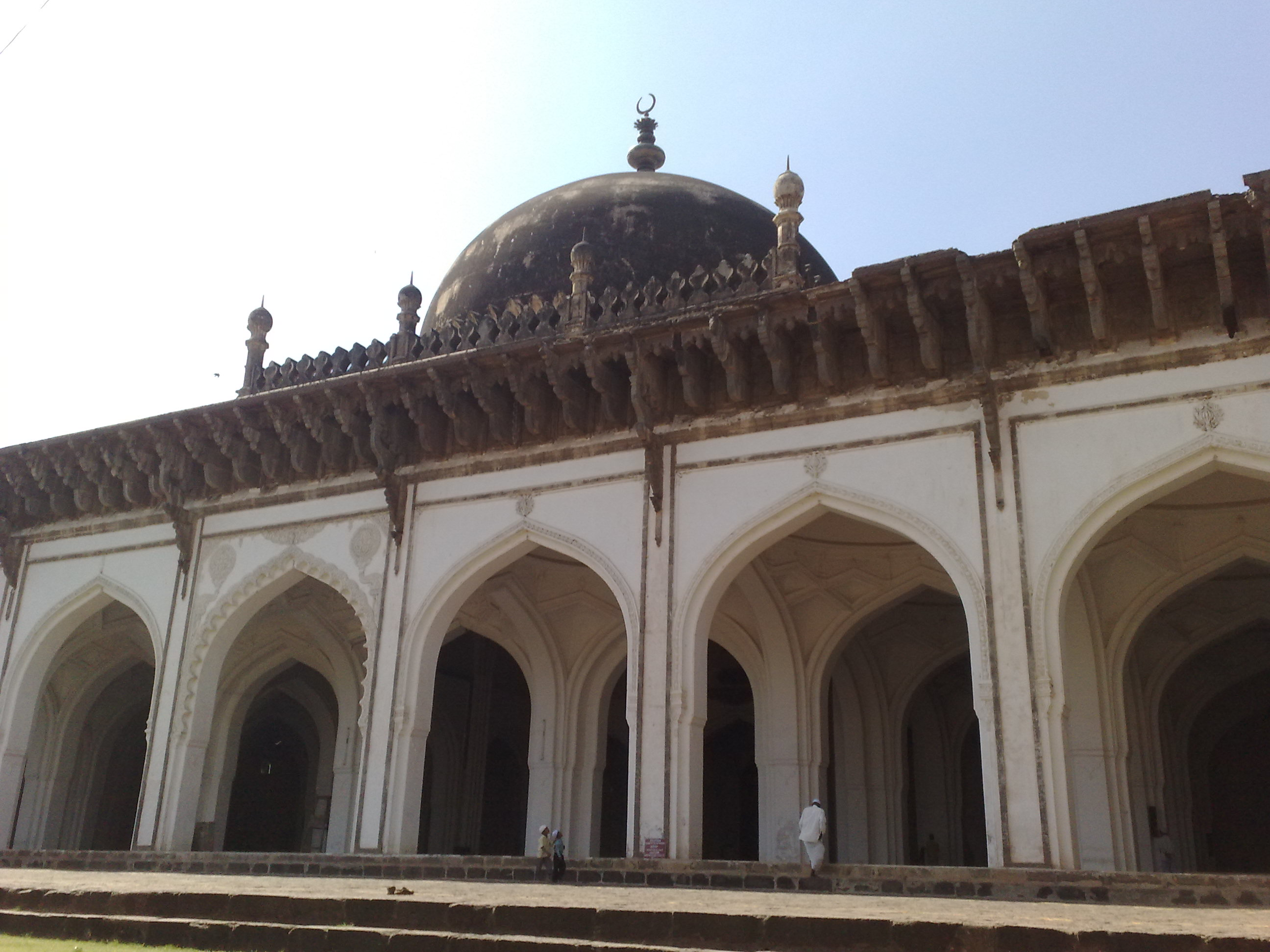
- The mosque, in 2009

- Location of the mosque in Karnataka

Religion
- Affiliation: Islam
- Ecclesiastical or organizational status: Congregational mosque
- Status: Active

Location
- Location: Bijapur, Karnataka
- Country: India
- Interactive map of Jama Mosque
- Coordinates: 16°49′19″N 75°43′44″E

Architecture
- Type: Mosque architecture
- Style: Indo-Islamic
- Founder: Ali Adil Shah I
- Funded by: Ali Adil Shah I; Muhammad Adil Shah (additions to mihrab); Aurangzeb (prayer hall)
- Groundbreaking: 1576
- Completed: incomplete

Specifications
- Capacity: 4,000 worshippers
- Length: 150 m (490 ft)
- Width: 80 m (260 ft)
- Site area: 5,040 m^{2} (54,300 sq ft)

The Jama Masjid, also known as Jamiya Masjid or Jumma Masjid, is a congregational mosque in Bijapur, in the state of Karnataka, India. Initiated by Ali Adil Shah I of the Bijapur Sultanate in the 16th century, the mosque was never completed. It is the largest mosque in Bijapur, and has a capacity of 4,000 worshippers.

In 2014, UNESCO placed the building on its "tentative list" to become a World Heritage Site, under the name Monuments and Forts of the Deccan Sultanate. (Note: The singular use of "Sultanate" by UNESCO implies the existence of just one Sultanate. However, there were a number of different Sultanates.)

== History ==
The construction of the Jama Masjid was begun by Ali Adil Shah I in 1576 CE. The project was financed with money looted from the Battle of Talikota, in which an alliance of Deccan Sultanates had emerged victorious against the Vijayanagara Empire. Though the majority of the mosque was constructed by 1686, the structure never reached completion. It nonetheless came to serve as the principal mosque of Bijapur, replacing an older, smaller congregational mosque built by Ibrahim Adil Shah I.

Later rulers made some augmentations to the mosque. The addition of murals near the mosque's central mihrab was probably made by Muhammad Adil Shah. Mughal Emperor Aurangzeb added an eastern doorway to the mosque, and made modifications to the prayer hall's flooring.

== Architecture ==
The Jama Masjid is the largest mosque in the city of Bijapur, with a capacity of 4,000 worshippers. It is considered one of the finest examples of Adil Shahi architecture. Bianca Alfieri comments that the mosque draws elements from previous Bahmanid architecture. Additionally, Richard Eaton notes that the mosque is emblematic of Iranian influence, and does not incorporate local traditions to the extent of later Bijapuri architecture. The design and ornamentation of the mosque are quite simple; ArchNet explains this as a consequence of Ali Adil Shah's Shiism, since followers of the sect typically preferred less decoration in places of worship.

The rectangular mosque complex spreads over 5,040 square metres (54,300 sq ft), and is enclosed by perimeter walls. The main entrance to the complex is the eastern gate. Within the complex is a square sahn (courtyard) of side length 50 metres (160 ft), containing fountains and an ablution reservoir.

The main prayer hall, measures 70 by 36 metres (230 by 118 ft), and is situated on the west end of the complex. It is topped with a hemispherical dome, bearing a crescent-moon finial and surrounded by a balustrade at the base. The facade of the prayer hall features seven arched openings, of which the central one alone is decorated.

Supported by piers, the interior of the prayer hall is divided into five bays, running parallel to the western qibla wall. The interior emphasises clean lines over excessive embellishment; only minimal plaster-work is observed. Its floor is divided into 2250 rectangular boxes, resembling a prayer mat, though this was a later addition by Aurangzeb.

The generally minimal and austere nature of the interior is interrupted by heavy mural ornamentation surrounding the central mihrab, on the qibla wall. Gilded and decorated in blue, black and gold, the mihrab features varied imagery, and is dominated by Quranic epigraphy. The ornamentation is probably a later addition under Muhammad Adil Shah, attested by some Persian inscriptions near the mihrab. Unlike Ali, Muhammad Adil Shah was a Sunni, and this may be responsible for the stark aesthetic difference between the mosque and its mihrab. Its luxurious decoration has led Michell and Zebrowski to regard it as one of the finest in the Islamic world; they compare it to the mihrab of the Mosque–Cathedral in Córdoba.

=== Incomplete features ===
The mosque features corner buttressing on the eastern façade, indicating an unfulfilled intention to construct two minarets there. Additionally, merlons are absent from the parapets of the galleries surrounding the courtyard.

== Gallery ==
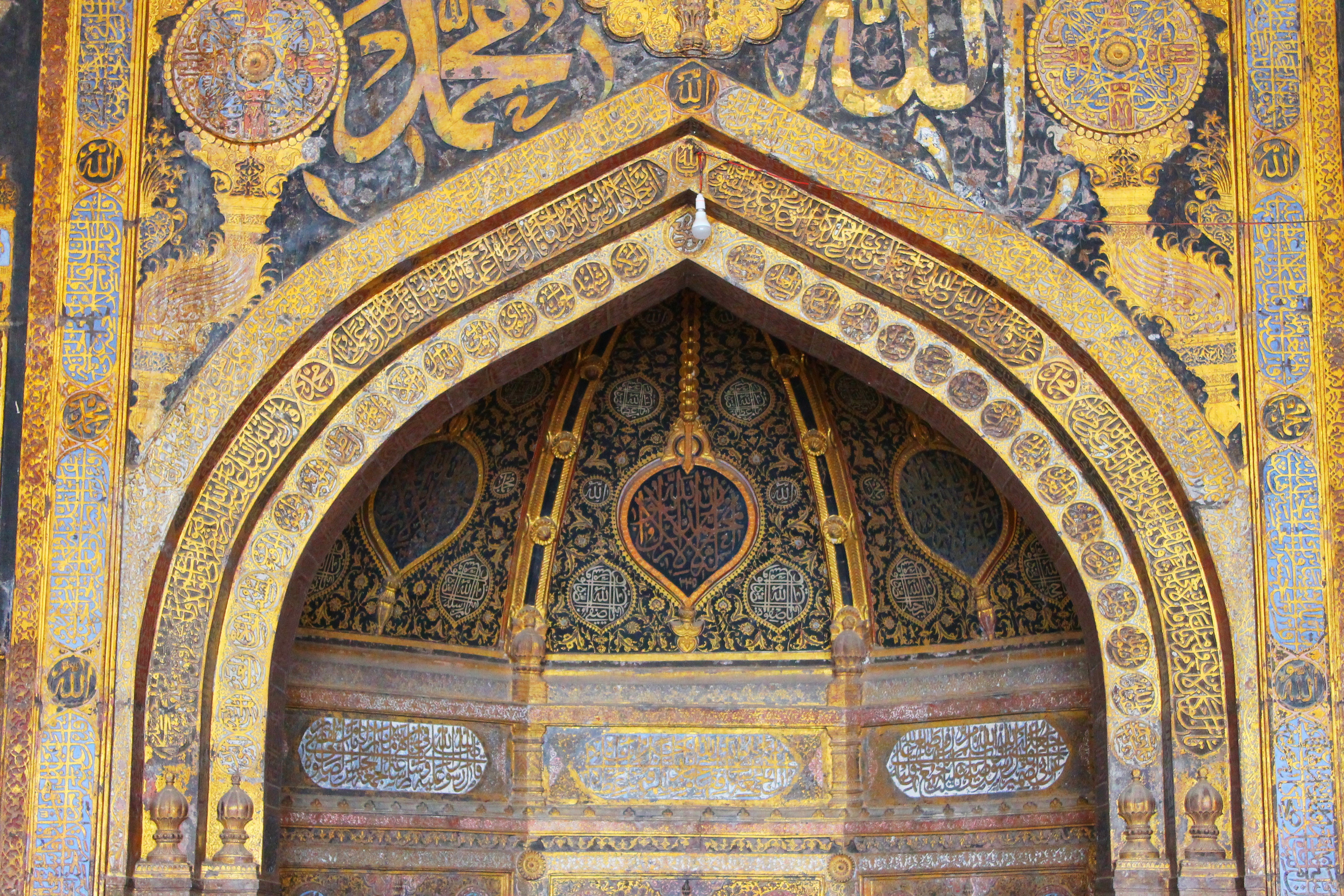
Close-up of the mihrab's spandrel

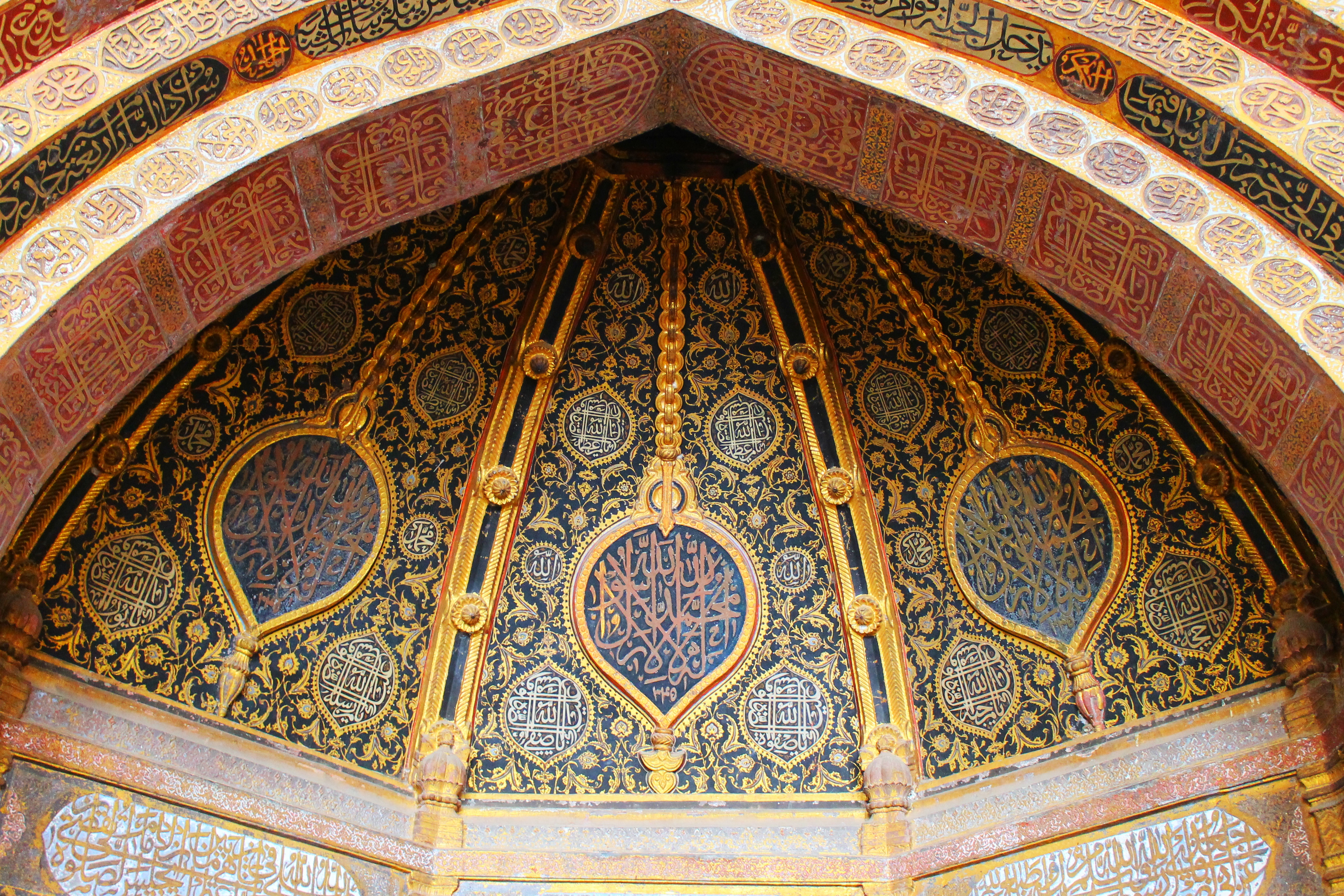
Another close up of the spandrel

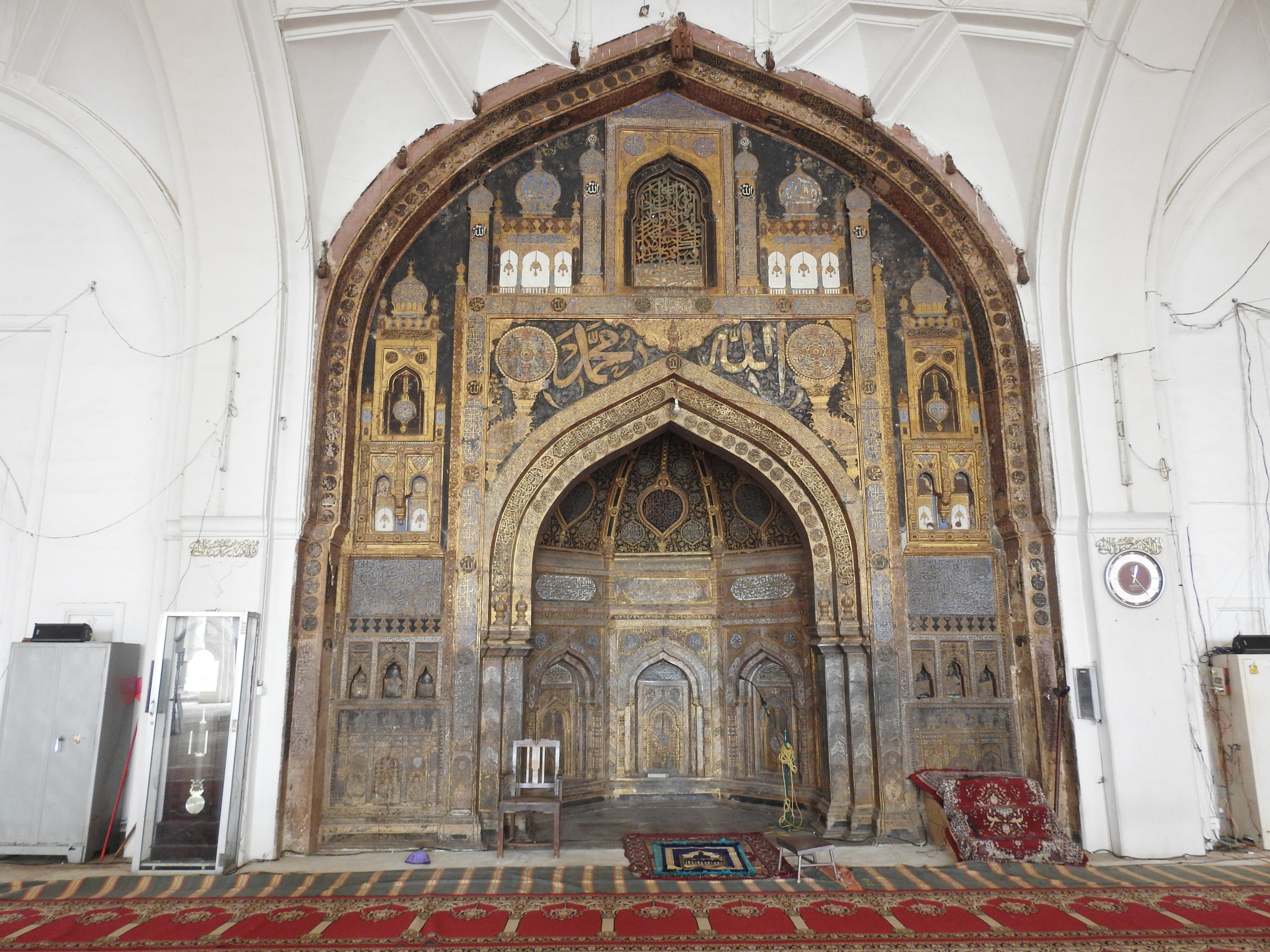
Mihrab

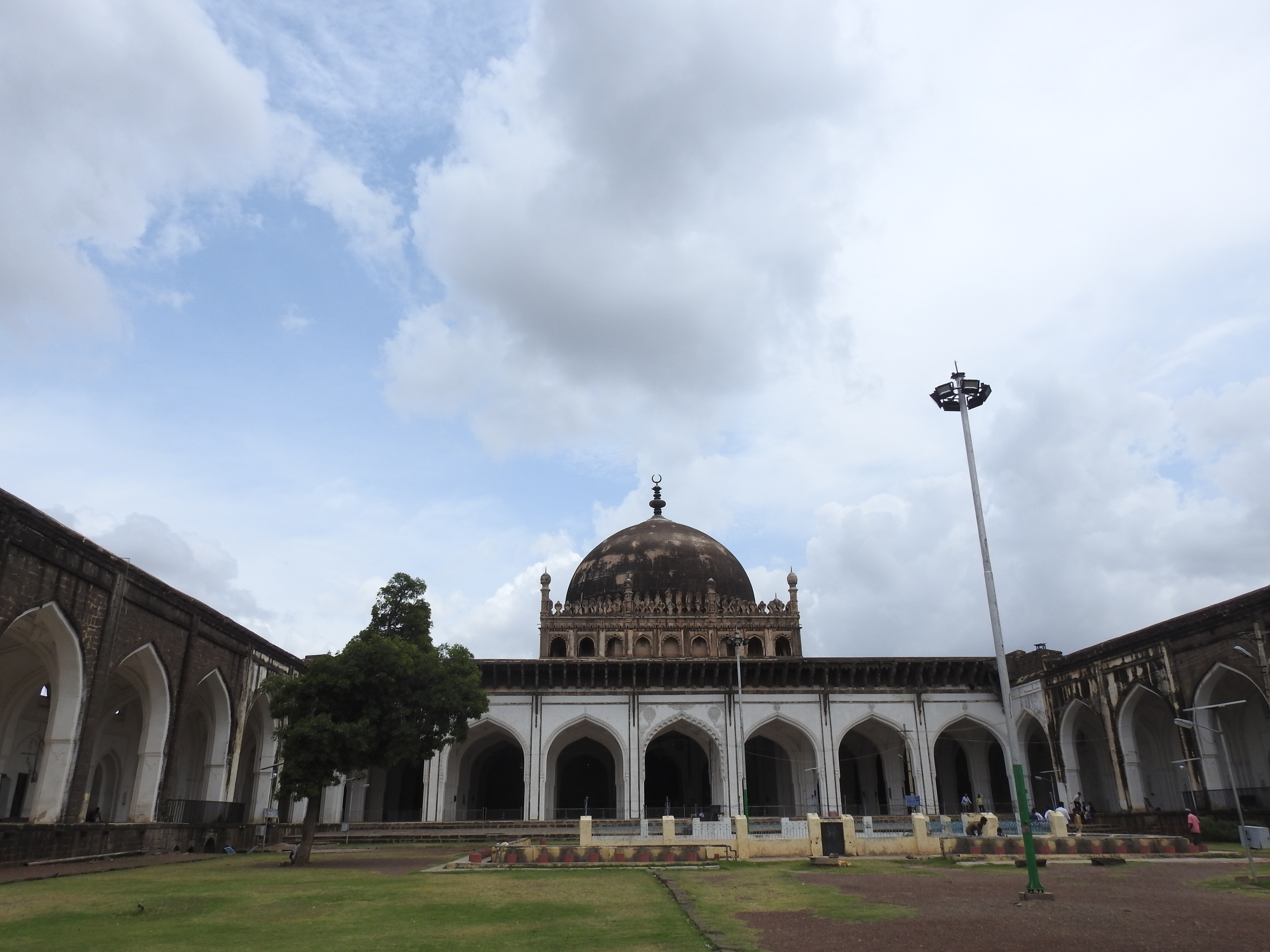
Wide view of complete site

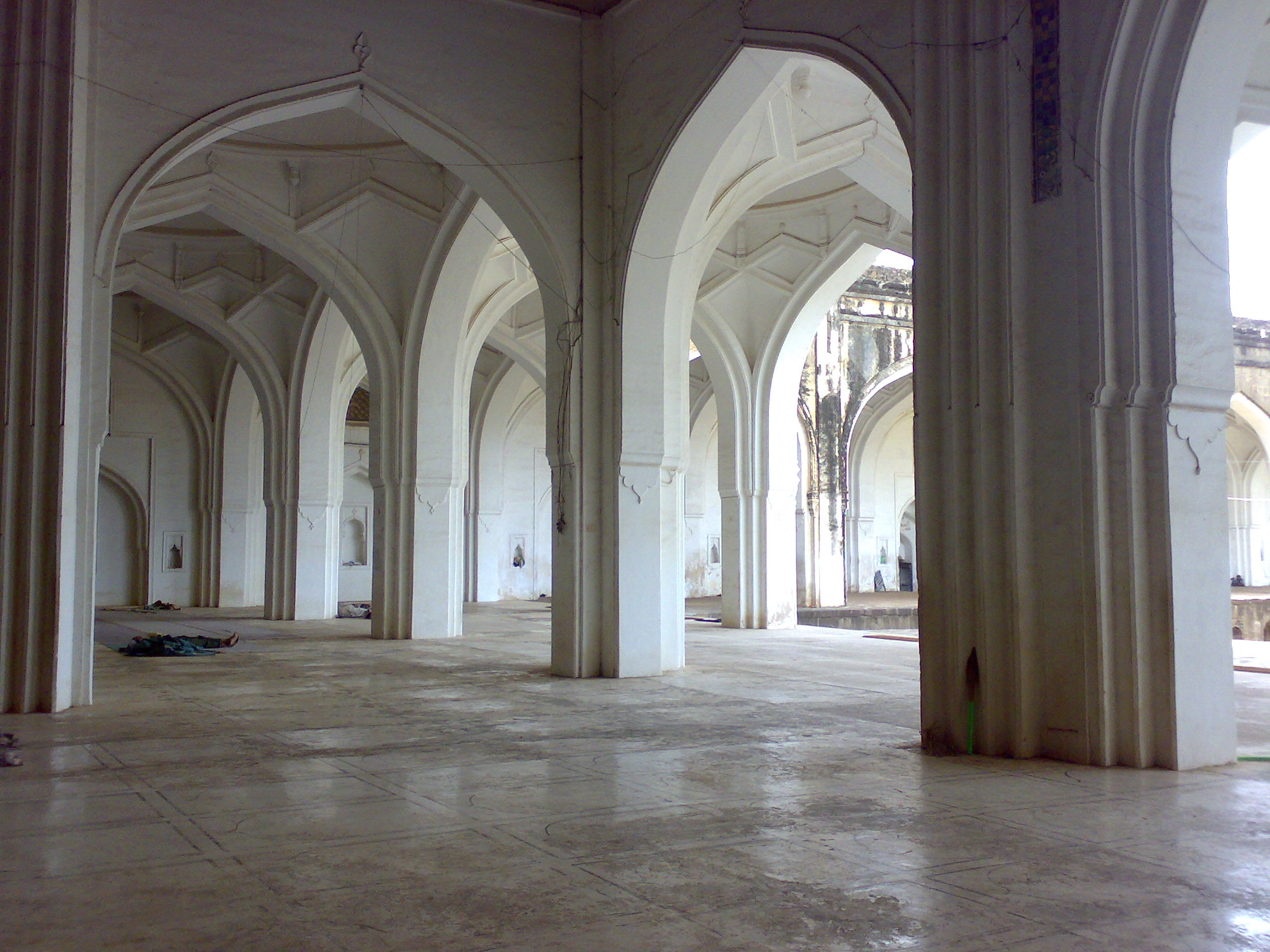
Arches, inside the mosque

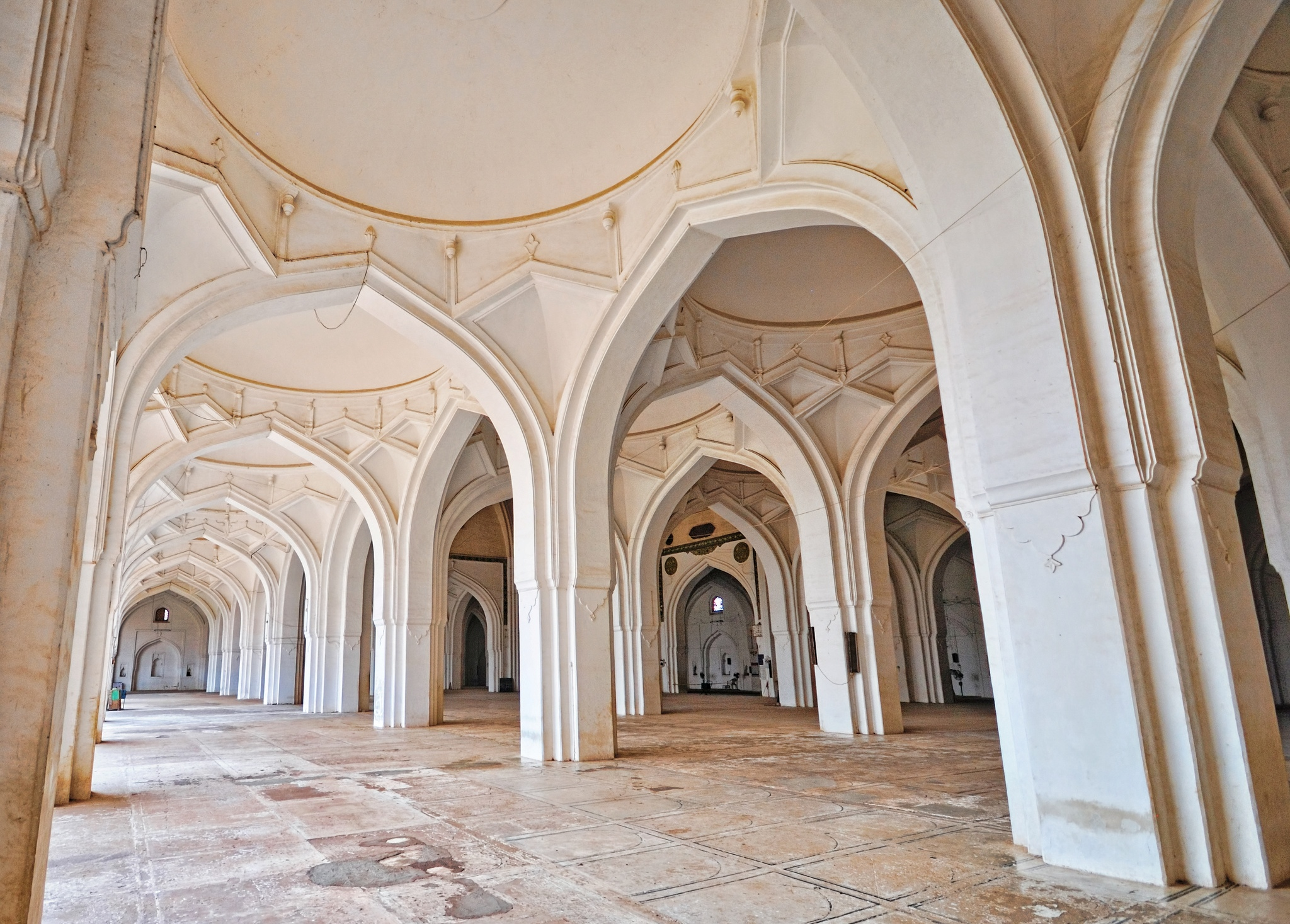
Arches

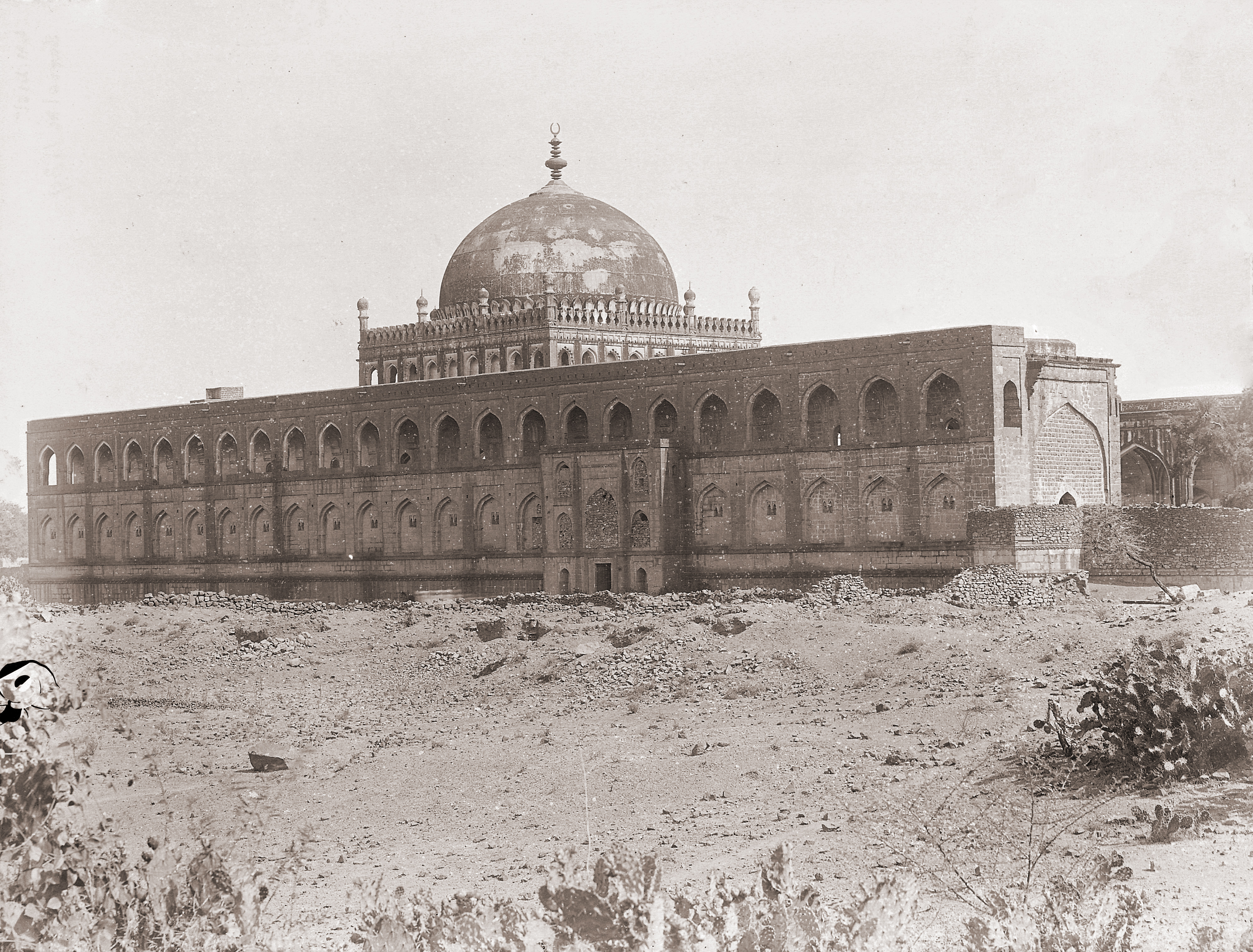
View of the south-east of the mosque in 1880

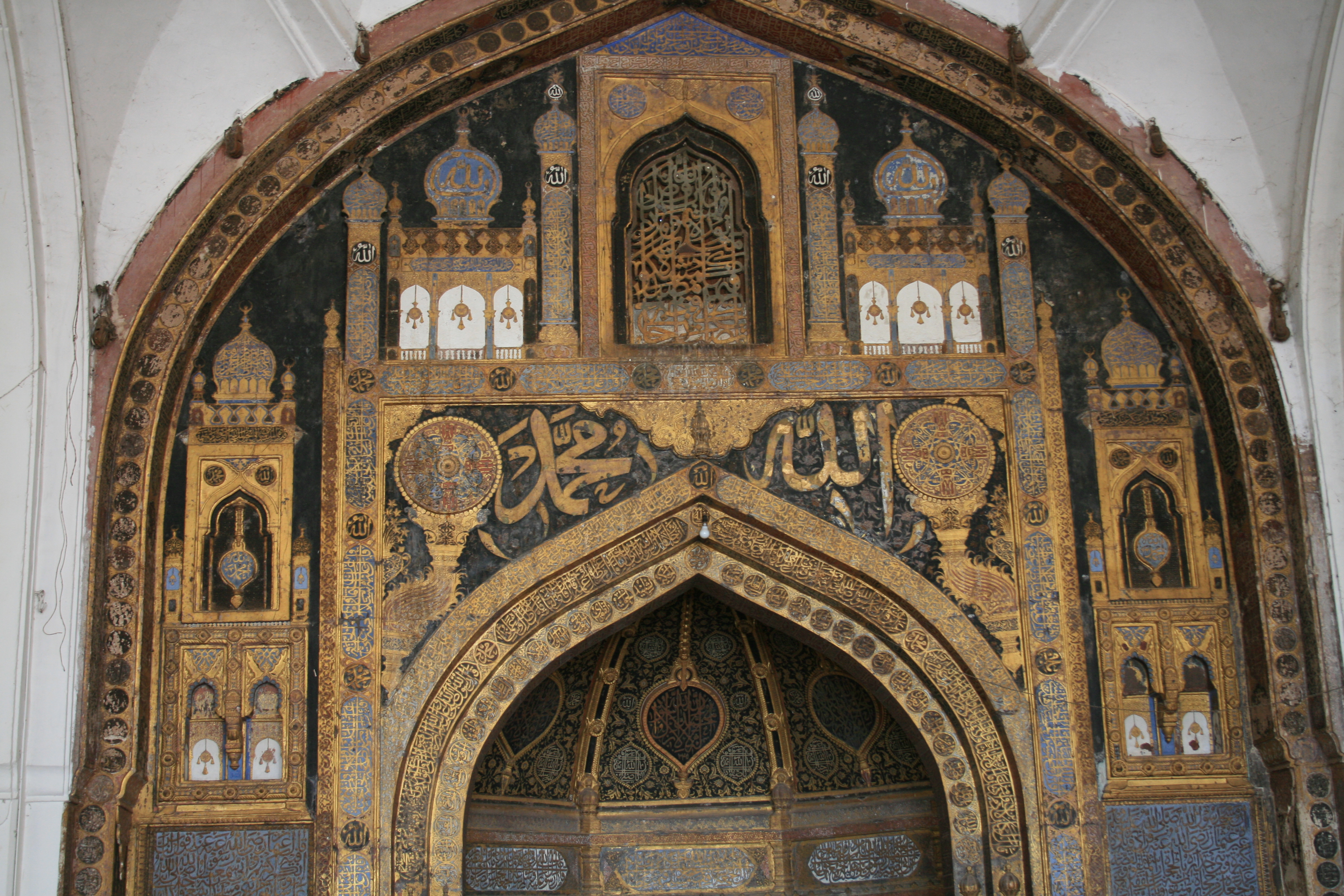
Calligraphy in mihrab

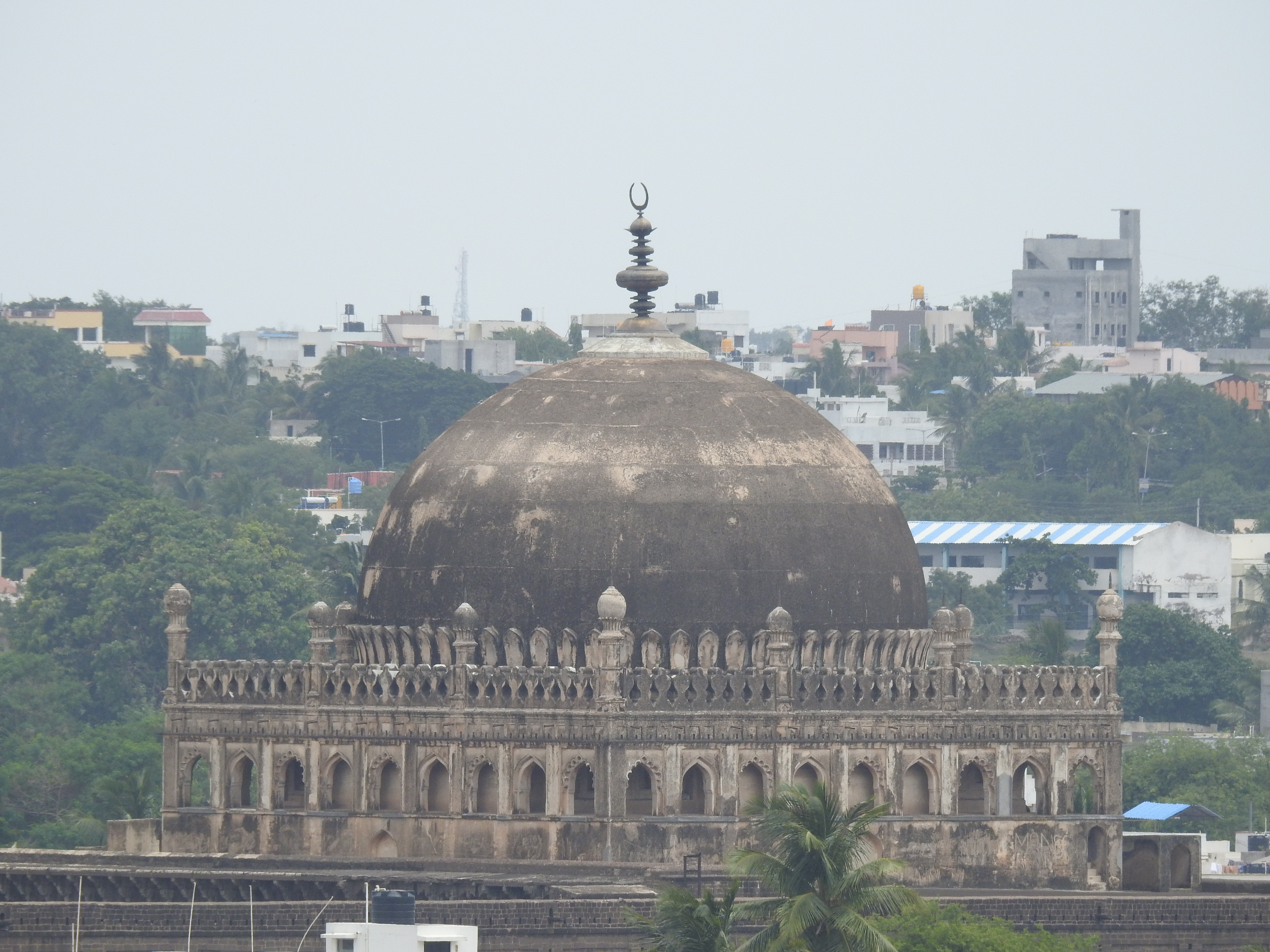
Dome of the mosque

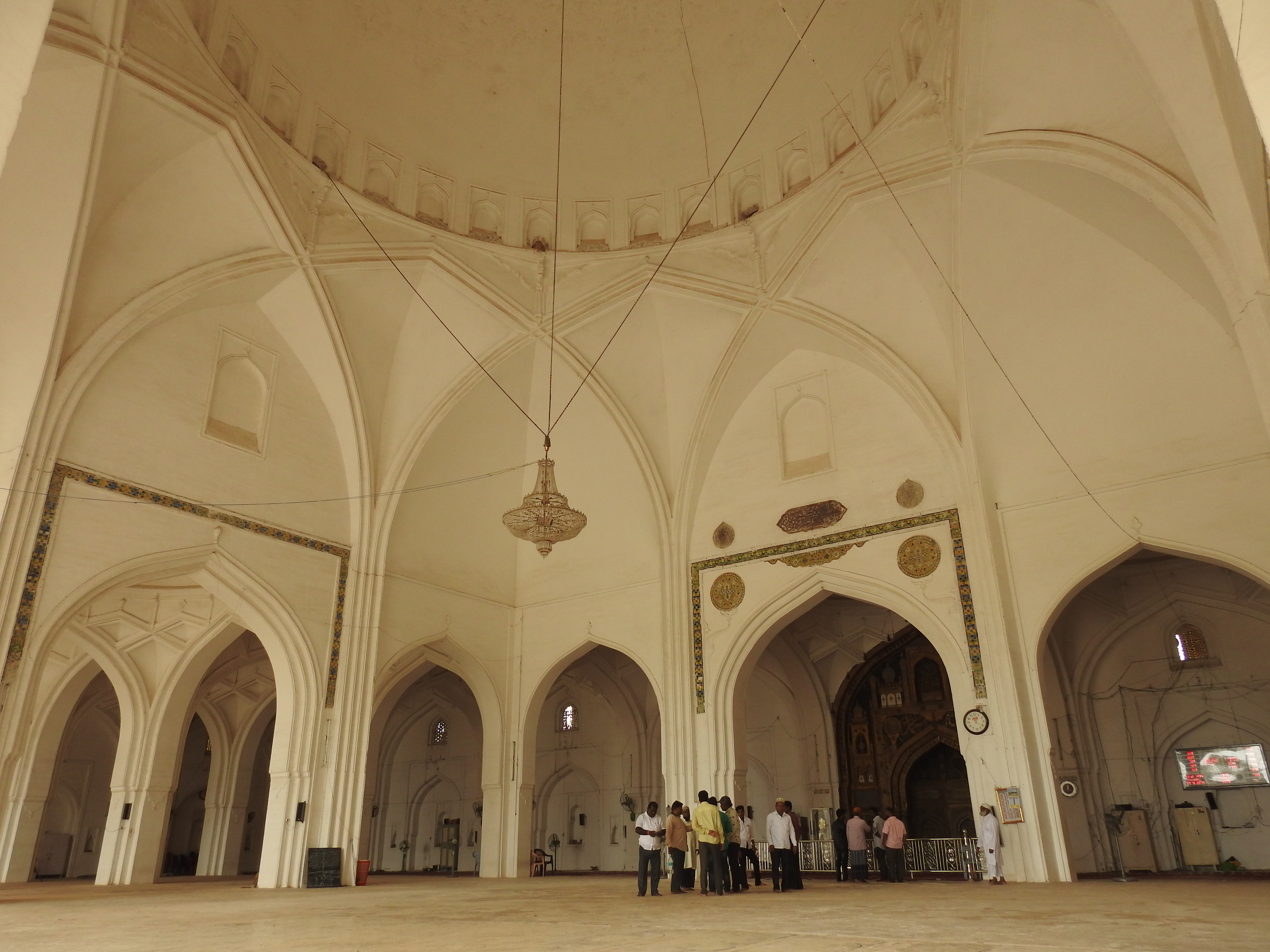
Central dome from inside

== See also ==
- Islam in India
- List of mosques in India
