= Gagan Mahal =

Palace in the Bijapur Fort

Coordinates: 16°49′36″N 75°43′06″E

The Gagan Mahal ("heavenly palace") is a palace located within the Bijapur Fort.

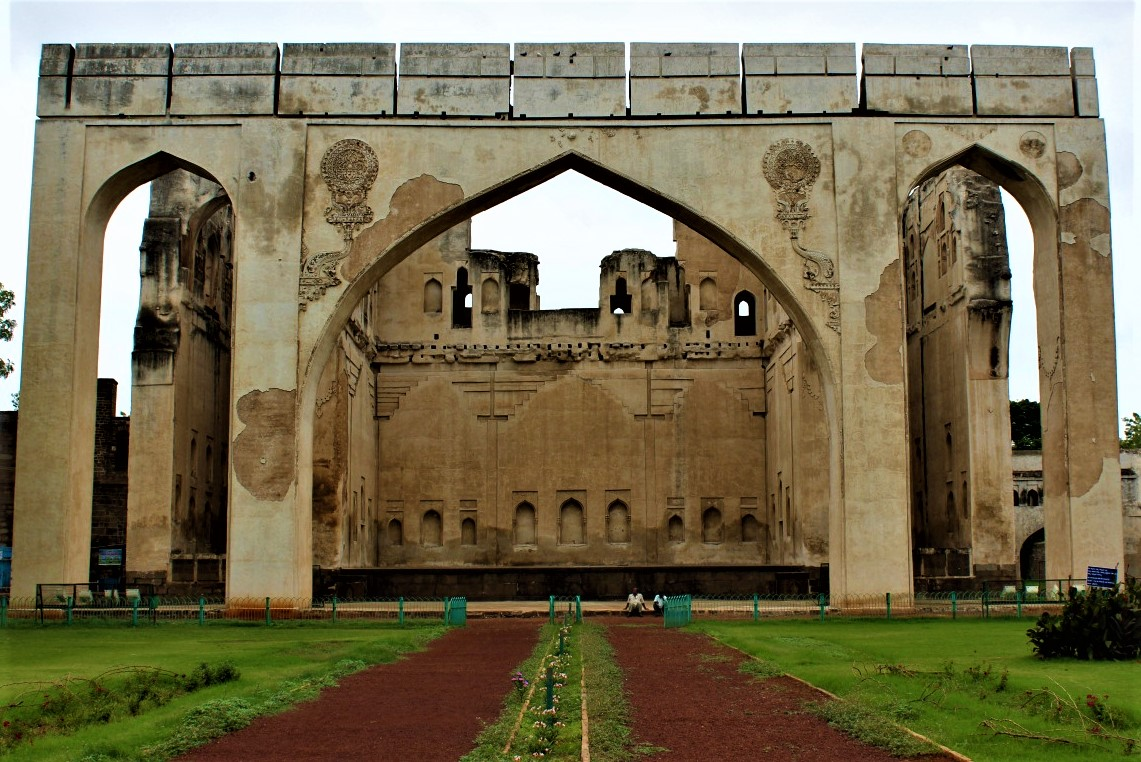
View of the Gagan Mahal.

== History and architecture ==
The palace is believed to have been built by Ali Adl Shah in 1561. However, there is evidence which points towards the palace existing as early as the reign of Yusuf Adil Shah. Ferishta had claimed that when the Bahmani Sultan Mahmud Shah visited Bijapur, after defeating the rebel Bahadur Gilani, he was lodged in the Gagan Mahal by Yusuf Adil Khan. The palace, situated west of the Anand Mahal, served the purpose of both a royal residence and a durbar hall. it was here where Sikandar Adil Shah, wrapped in silver chains, was presented before Aurangzeb after he had successfully captured Bijapur.

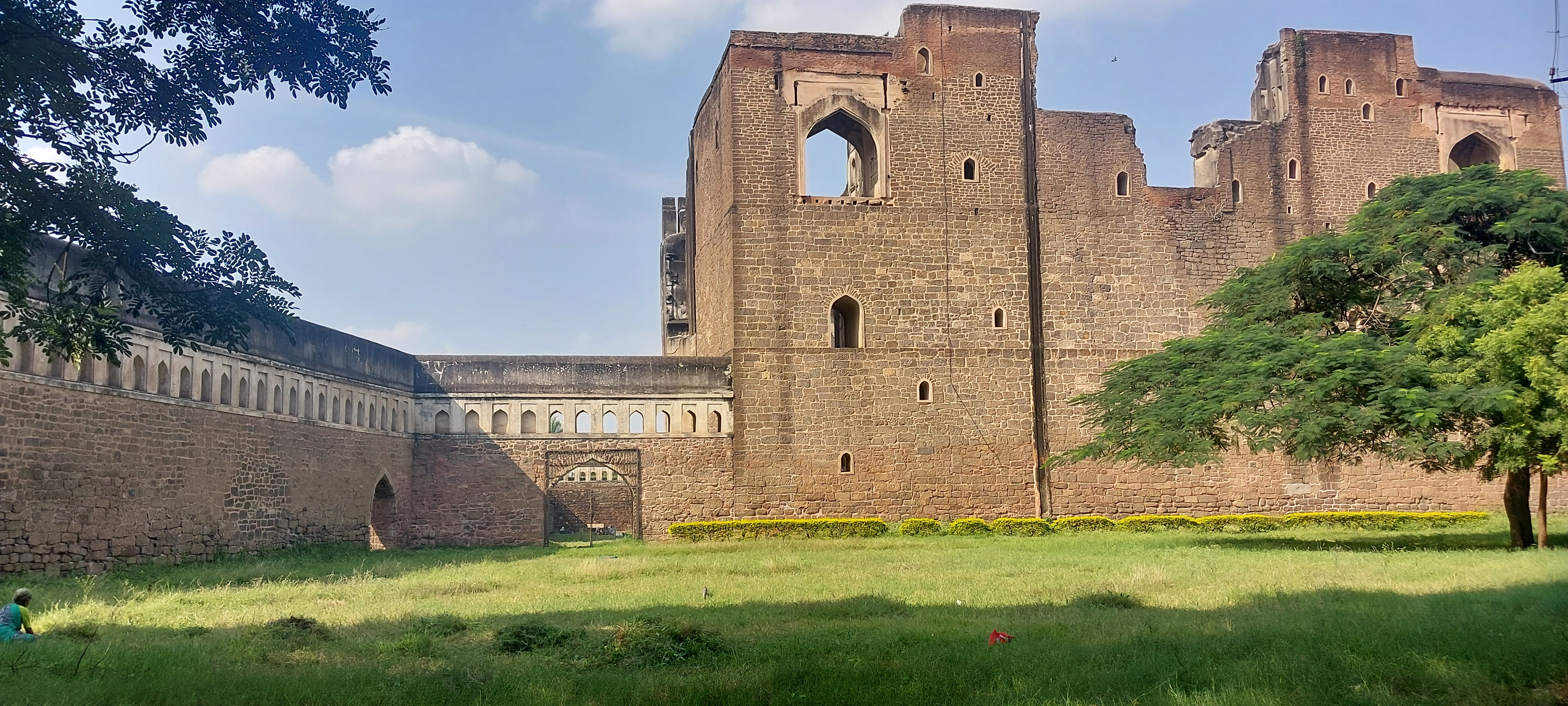
The backside view of the palace.

The private apartments were supported by two massive wooden pillars, above which were galleries where the women of the palace could oversee the happenings down below trough the suspended screens. The side chambers ran forward up to the big arched facade above, with staircases leading up to them. The palace has a large central arch the same length of the hall, which is flanked by two large archways. Latticed windows built from wooden frames, projecting balconies and elaborate chhaja are built on the walls.
