= Lists of Indian people =

These are lists of people from India. They are grouped by various criteria, including ethnicity, states and union territories and city.

== By state or union territory ==
=== States ===
- List of people from Andhra Pradesh
- List of people from Arunachal Pradesh
- List of people from Assam
- List of people from Bihar
- List of people from Chhattisgarh
- List of people from Goa
- List of people from Gujarat
- List of people from Haryana
- List of people from Himachal Pradesh
- List of people from Jharkhand
- List of people from Karnataka
- List of people from Kerala
- List of people from Madhya Pradesh
- List of people from Maharashtra
- Category:People from Manipur
- Category:People from Meghalaya
- Category:People from Mizoram
- List of people from Nagaland
- List of people from Odisha
- List of people from Punjab, India
- List of people from Rajasthan
- List of people from Sikkim
- List of people from Tamil Nadu
- List of people from Telangana
- List of people from Tripura
- List of people from Uttar Pradesh
- List of people from Uttarakhand
- List of people from West Bengal

=== Union Territories ===
- Category:People from the Andaman and Nicobar Islands
- Category:People from Chandigarh
- Category:People from Dadra and Nagar Haveli and Daman and Diu
- List of people from Delhi
- List of people from Jammu and Kashmir
- Category:People from Lakshadweep
- Category:People from Ladakh
- List of people from Pondicherry

== By city ==
- List of people from Ahmedabad
- List of people from Alappuzha
- List of people from Amritsar
- List of people from Ballia
- List of people from Bengaluru
- List of people from Bijapur, Karnataka
- List of people from Chennai
- List of people from Coimbatore
- List of people from Delhi
- List of people from Guntur
- List of people from Howrah
- List of people from Hyderabad
- List of people from Indore
- List of people from Jamshedpur
- List of people from Jodhpur
- List of people from Kanpur
- List of people from Kohima
- List of people from Kolkata
- List of people from Lucknow
- List of people from Madurai
- List of people from Mumbai
- List of people from Nagercoil
- List of people from Nagpur
- List of people from Panadura
- List of people from Patna
- List of people from Prayagraj
- List of people from Pune
- List of people from Thalassery
- List of people from Thiruvananthapuram
- List of people from Thrissur
- List of people from Tiruchirappalli
- List of people from Varanasi

== By ethnicity ==
- List of Adivasis
- List of Bengalis
- List of Dalits
- List of Garhwali people
- List of Gujaratis
- List of Kashmiri people
- List of Kodavas
- List of Kumaoni people
- List of Maithils
- List of Marathi people
- List of Naga people
- List of people of Angami descent
- List of Parsis
- List of Punjabi people
- List of Sindhi people
- List of Tamil people
- List of Telugu people
- List of Tulu people

== By occupation ==
=== Arts and Culture ===
- List of Indian architects
- List of Indian artists
- List of Indian women artists
- List of Indian Nobel laureates
- List of Indian painters
- List of Indian poets
- List of Indian playback singers
- List of Indian violinists

=== Defense ===
- List of serving marshals of the Indian Air Force
- List of serving admirals of the Indian Navy
- List of serving generals of the Indian Army

=== Business ===
- List of Indian businesswomen
- List of Indian entrepreneurs

=== Entertainment ===
- List of Indian child actors
- List of Indian comedians
- List of Indian film directors
- List of Indian dubbing artists
- List of Indian film actors
- List of Indian film actresses
- List of Indian Grammy Award winners and nominees
- List of Indian television actors
- List of Indian television actresses
- List of Indian winners and nominees at the Cannes Film Festival

=== Law ===
- List of chief justices of India
- List of female chief justices in India
- List of former judges of the Supreme Court of India
- List of female judges of the Supreme Court of India

=== Media ===
- List of Indian journalists
- List of Indian writers
- List of Indian women writers

=== Politics ===
- List of Indian monarchs
- List of Indian independence activists

=== Science and technology ===
- List of Indian astronauts
- List of Indian dentists
- List of Indian mathematicians
- List of Indian physicists
- List of Indian scientists

=== Sports ===
- List of Indian archers
- List of Indian chess players
- List of Indian cricketers
- List of India national cricket captains
- List of Indian field hockey captains in Olympics
- List of India international field hockey players
- List of Indian expatriate footballers
- List of India Davis Cup team representatives
- List of India international footballers
- List of Indian sportswomen
- List of flag bearers for India at the Olympics

== See also ==
- Lists of people by nationality
