= Four-centred arch =

Type of arch with a pointed apex

Construction of a four-centred arch

A four-centred arch (Commonwealth spelling) or four-centered arch (American spelling) is a low, wide type of arch with a pointed apex. Its structure is achieved by drafting two arcs which rise steeply from each springing point on a small radius, and then turning into two arches with a wide radius and much lower springing point. It is a pointed sub-type of the general flattened depressed arch. This type of arch uses space efficiently and decoratively when used for doorways. It is also employed as a wall decoration in which arcade and window openings form part of the whole decorative surface. Two of the most notable types are known as the Persian arch, which is moderately "depressed" and found in Islamic architecture, and the Tudor arch, which is much flatter and found in English architecture. Another variant, the keel arch, has partially straight rather than curved sides and developed in Fatimid architecture. (Note: The term "keel arch" is also used broadly by some authors to denote the pointed ogee arch.)

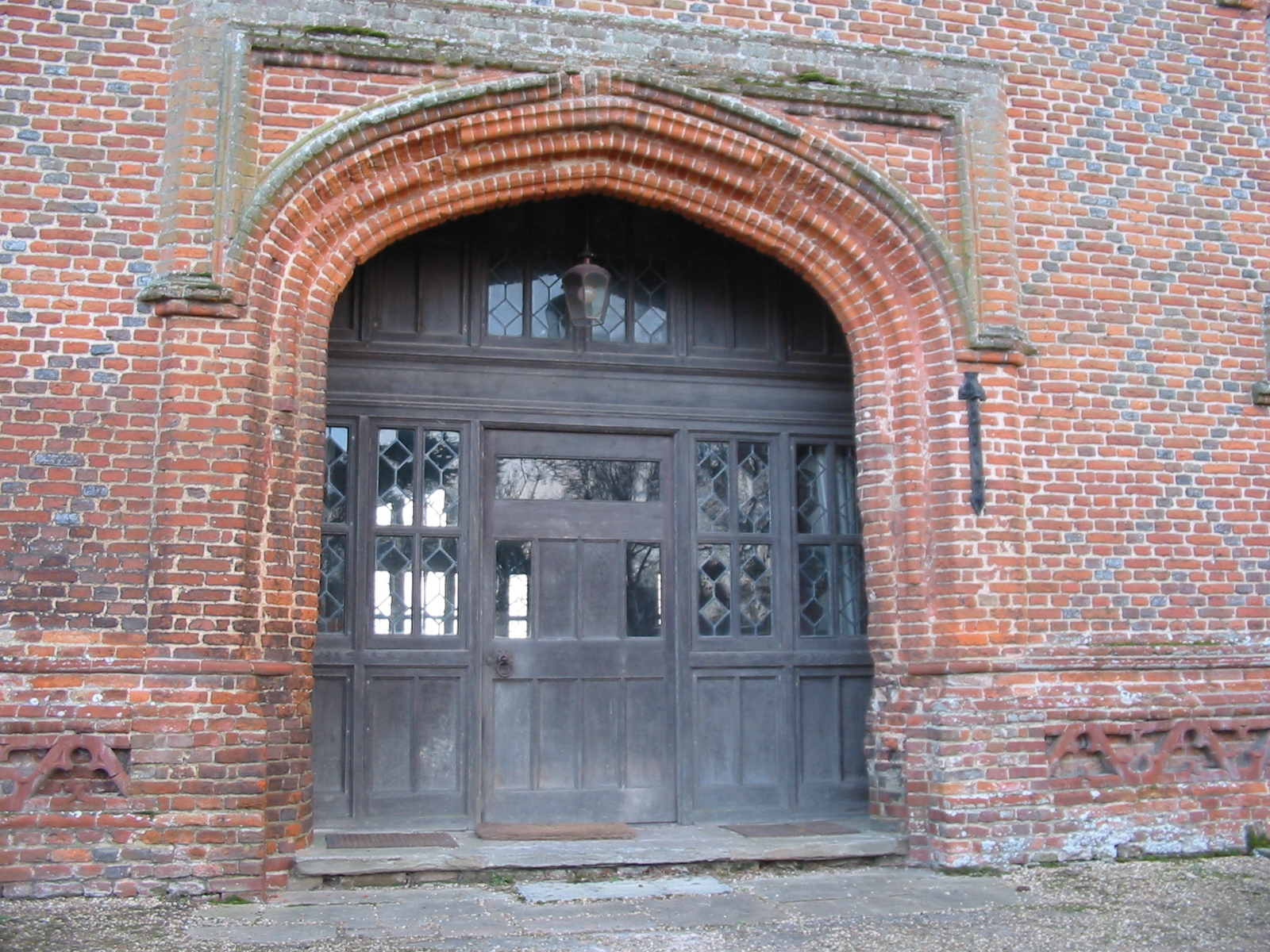
Tudor arch at Layer Marney Tower, 1520s

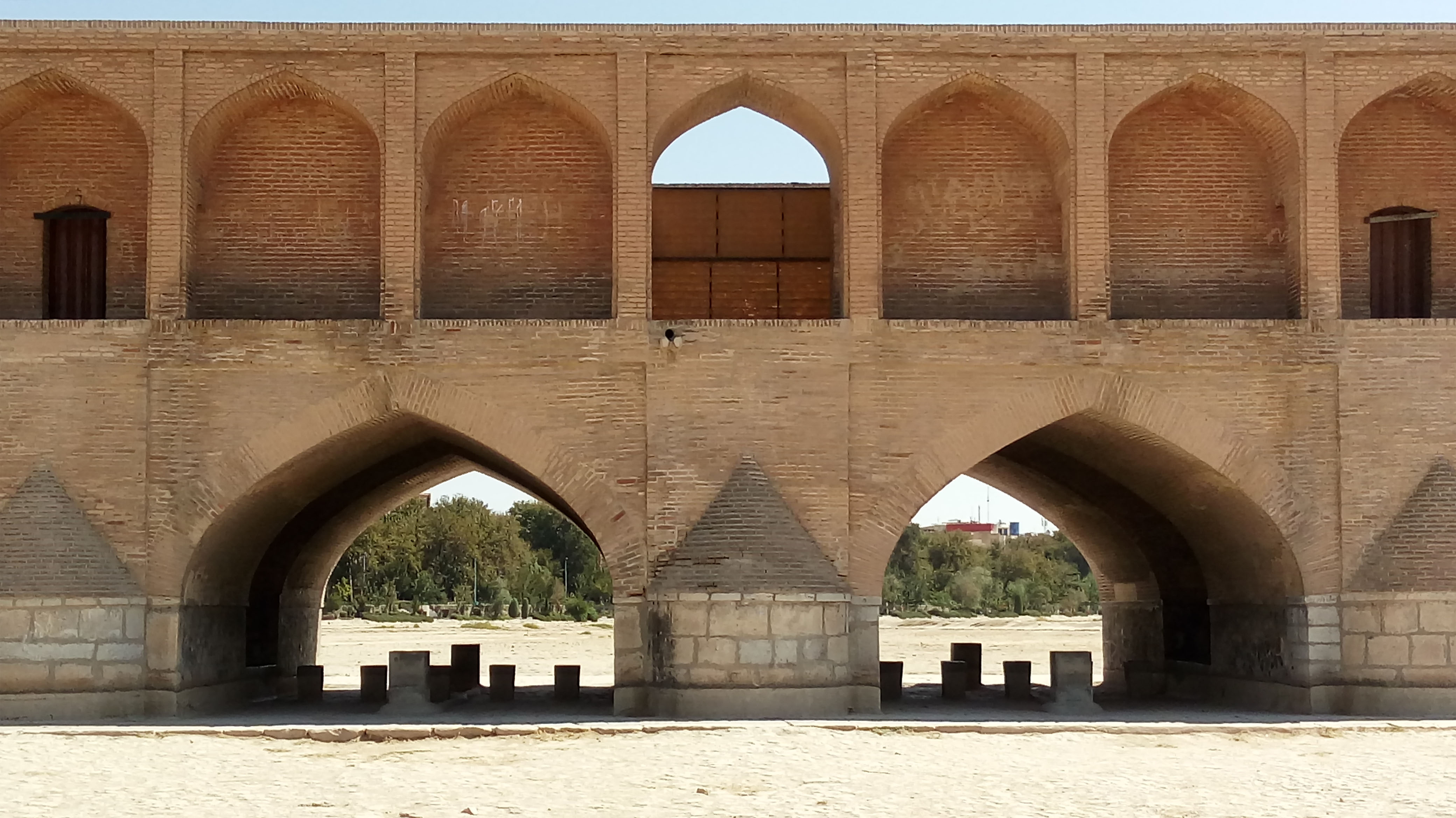
Persian arches on the Si-o-se-pol bridge, Isfahan, c. 1600

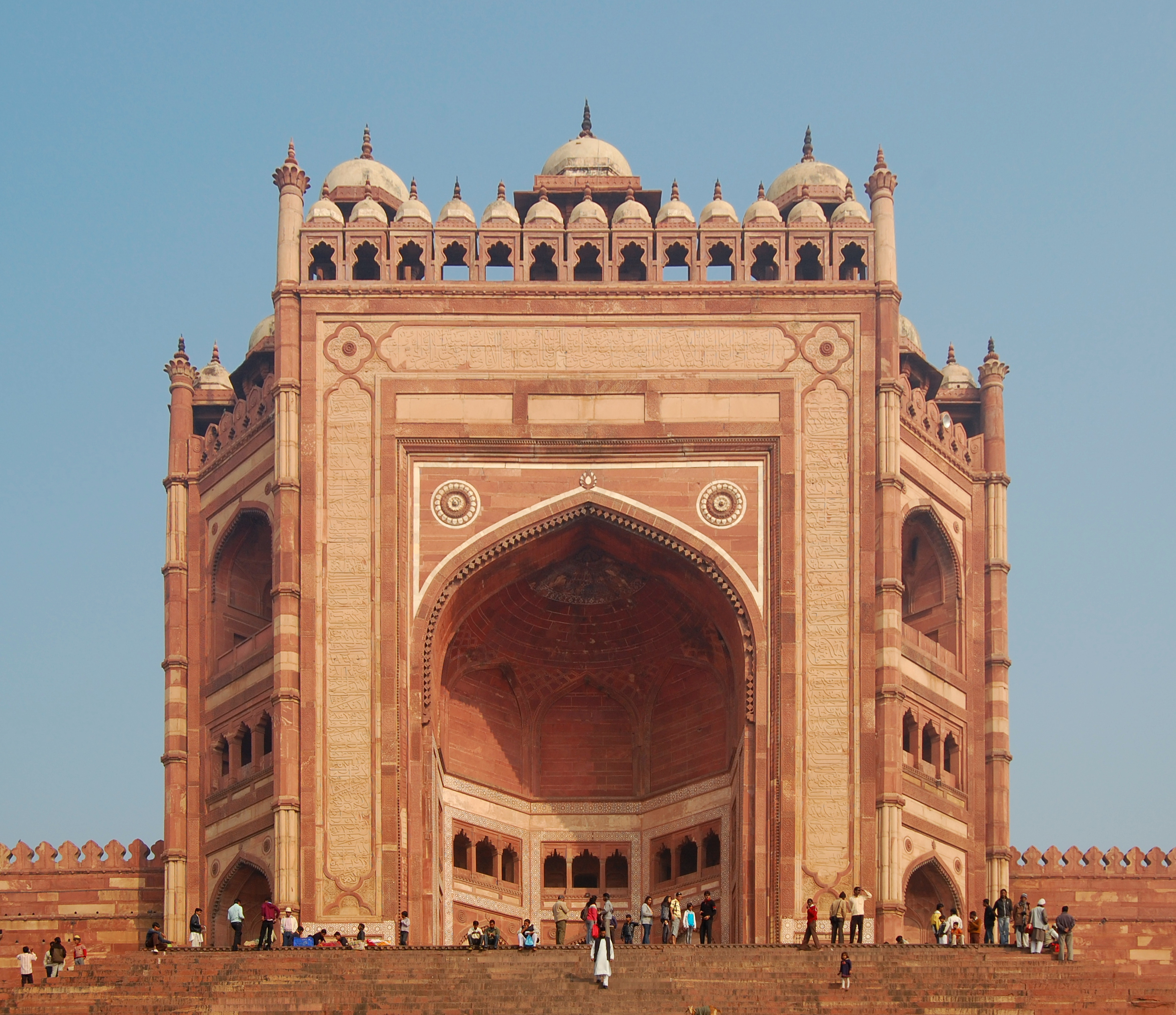
The 17th century Buland Darwaza at Fatehpur Sikri has a four-centred archway with vaulted iwan.

== Use in Islamic architecture ==
The four-centered arch is widely used in Islamic architecture, originally employed by the Abbasids and later by the Fatimids and by Persianate cultures. The earliest examples of a four-centered arch were introduced at Samarra, a purpose-built capital built by the Abbasids in the 9th century. Here they are found in the portals of the Qubbat al-Sulaiybiyya, an octagonal pavilion, and the Qasr al-'Ashiq palace. Later, the four-centered arch appeared commonly in the architecture of the Ghurid Empire, which ruled over large parts of Iran, Central Asia, and the northern Indian Subcontinent in the 12th to 13th centuries. It was very common in the architecture of the Timurid Empire and its successor states, becoming a standard form of wider Iranian architecture and later Mughal architecture. In this Persianate cultural sphere it was used for forms such as arcades, windows, gateways, and iwans. Pointed three-centered arches were also frequently used in Iran and Central Asia.

A variant of the four-centered arch, typically referred to as the "keel arch", became especially characteristic of Fatimid architecture. It is distinguished from other four-centered arches by having most of the arch's normal radius appear more straight than curved. It became standard for a while in Egyptian Islamic architecture in the 12th century. Blind keel arch niches appeared frequently as a motif of decorated façades in late Fatimid, Ayyubid, and early Mamluk architecture in Cairo.

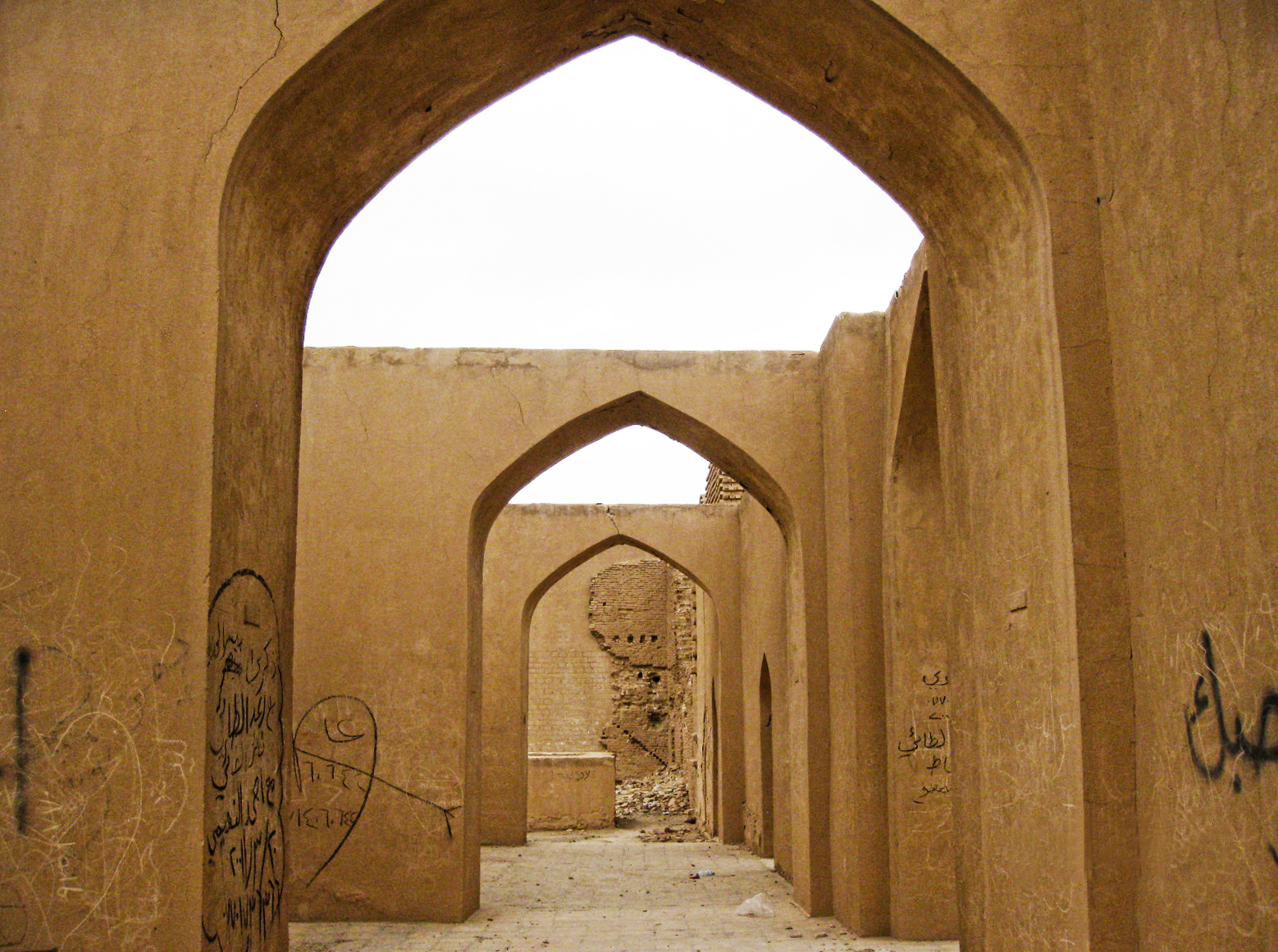
Restored 9th century arches of the Qasr al-'Ashiq, Samarra.

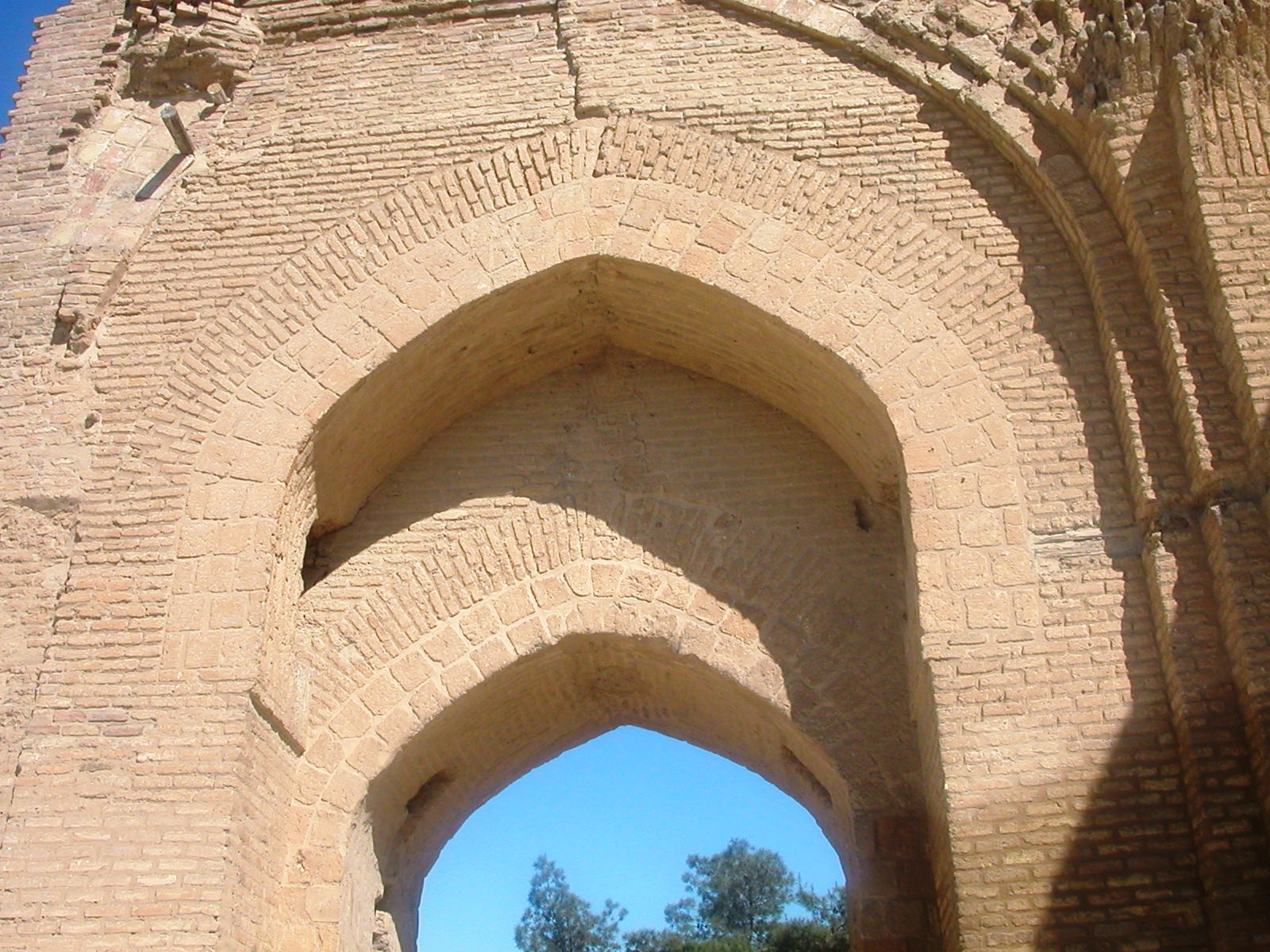
The 11th/12th century Baghdad Gate, Raqqa.

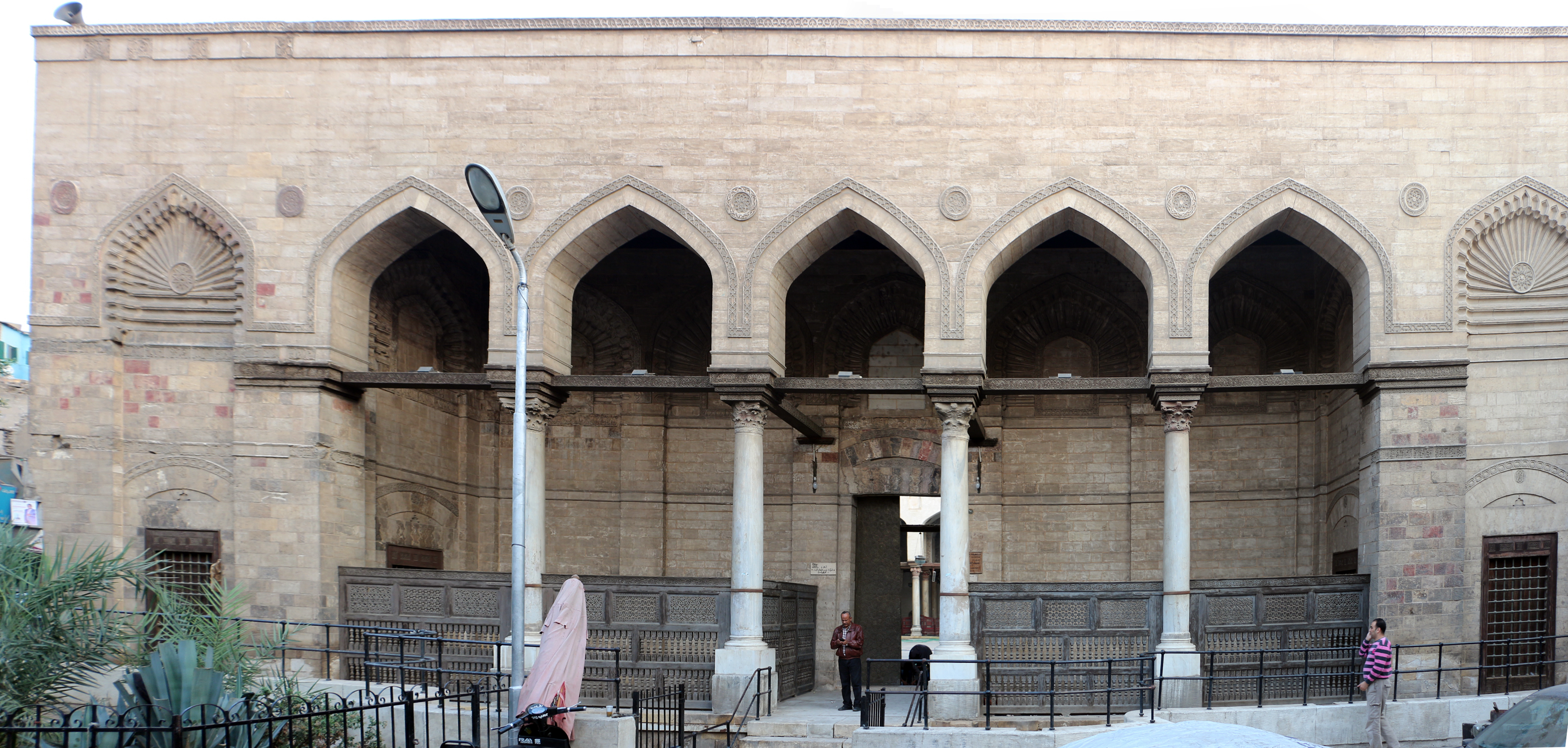
Keel arches in the façade of the al-Salih Tala'i Mosque in Cairo (1160, late Fatimid period)

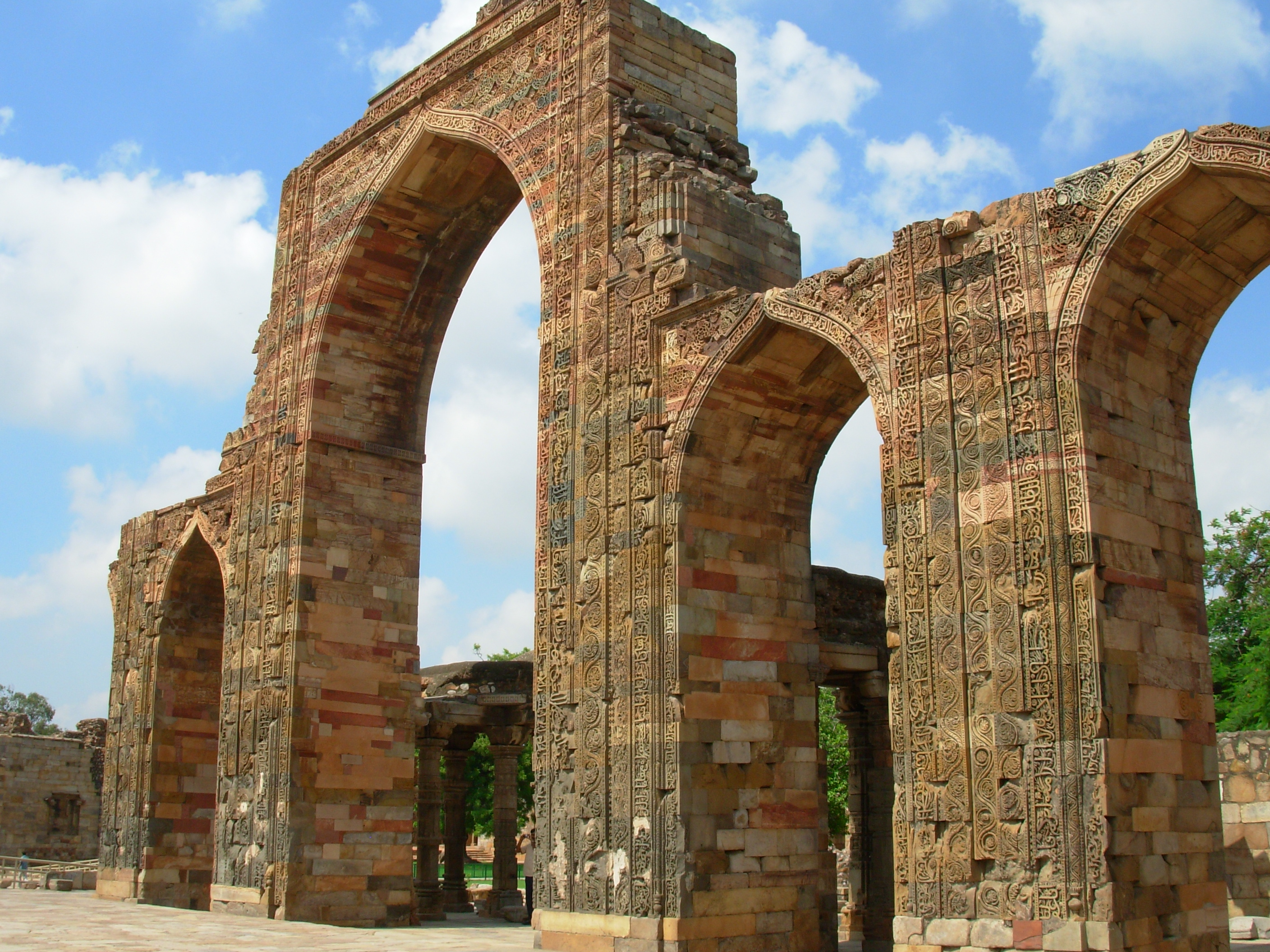
The 13th century corbelled arches of the Quwwat ul-Islam Mosque, Delhi.

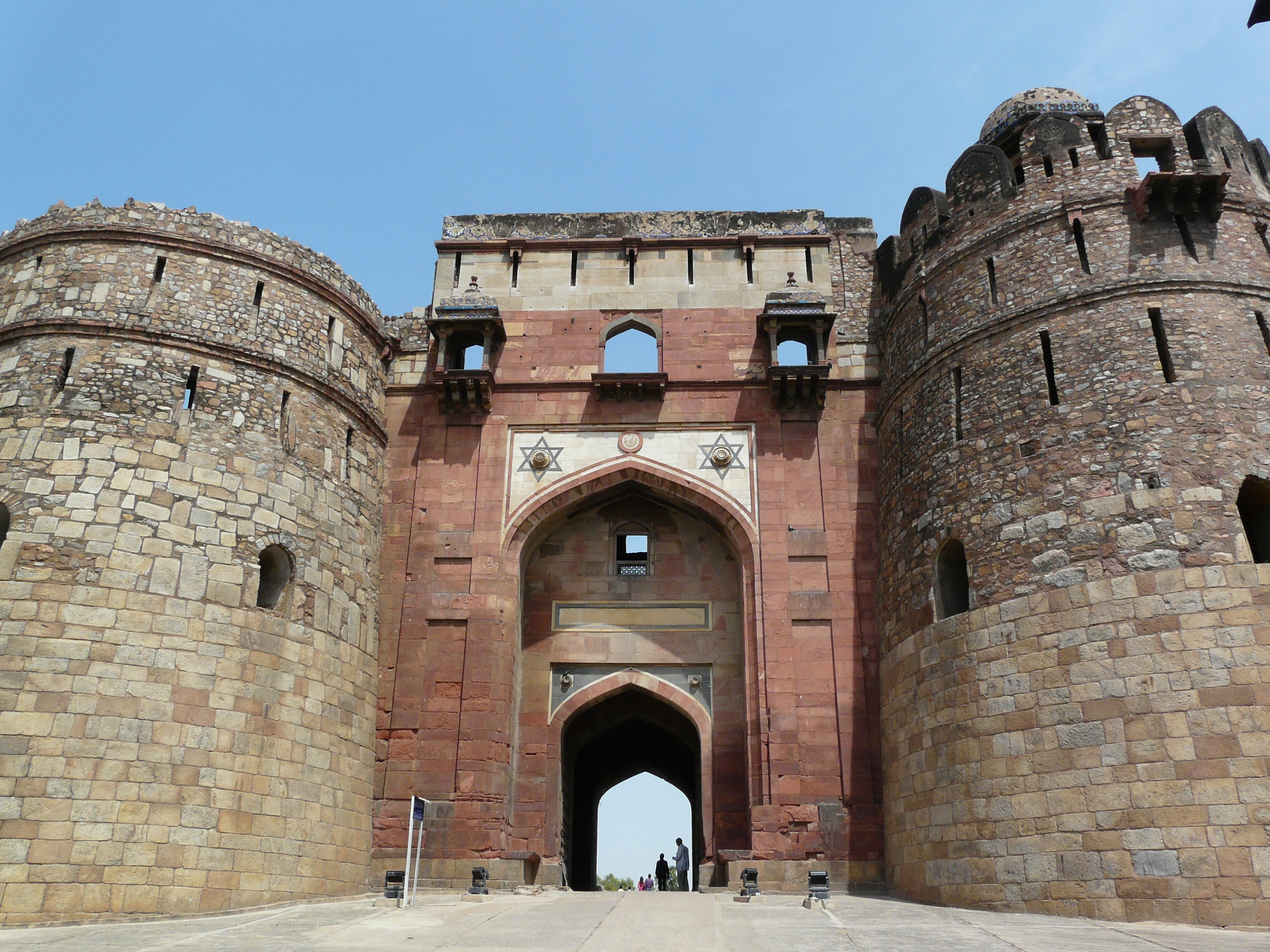
The 16th century western gate of the Purana Qil'a fortress, Delhi.

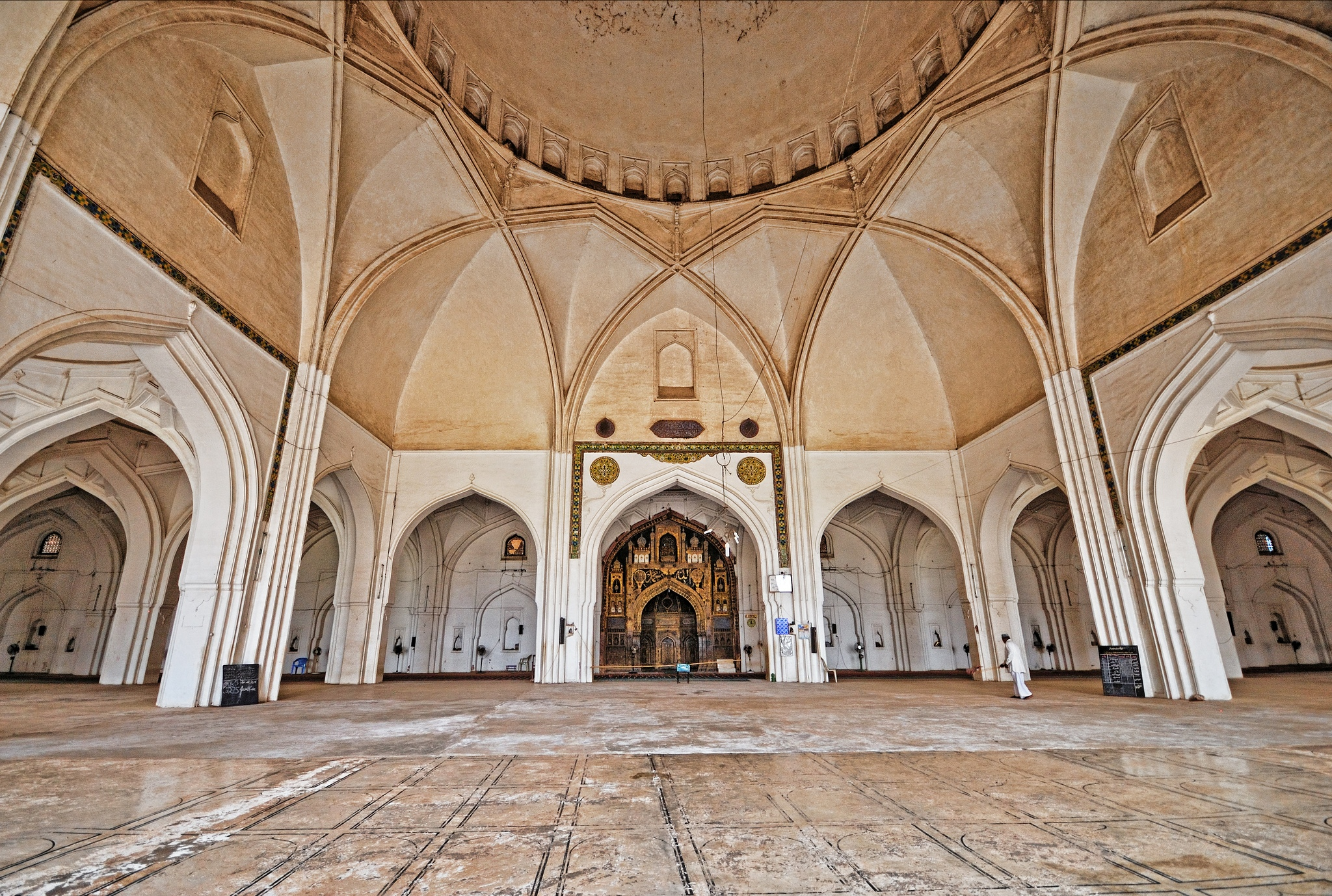
The 16th century Jama Mosque in Bijapur with rib vaulting consisting of four-centred arches.

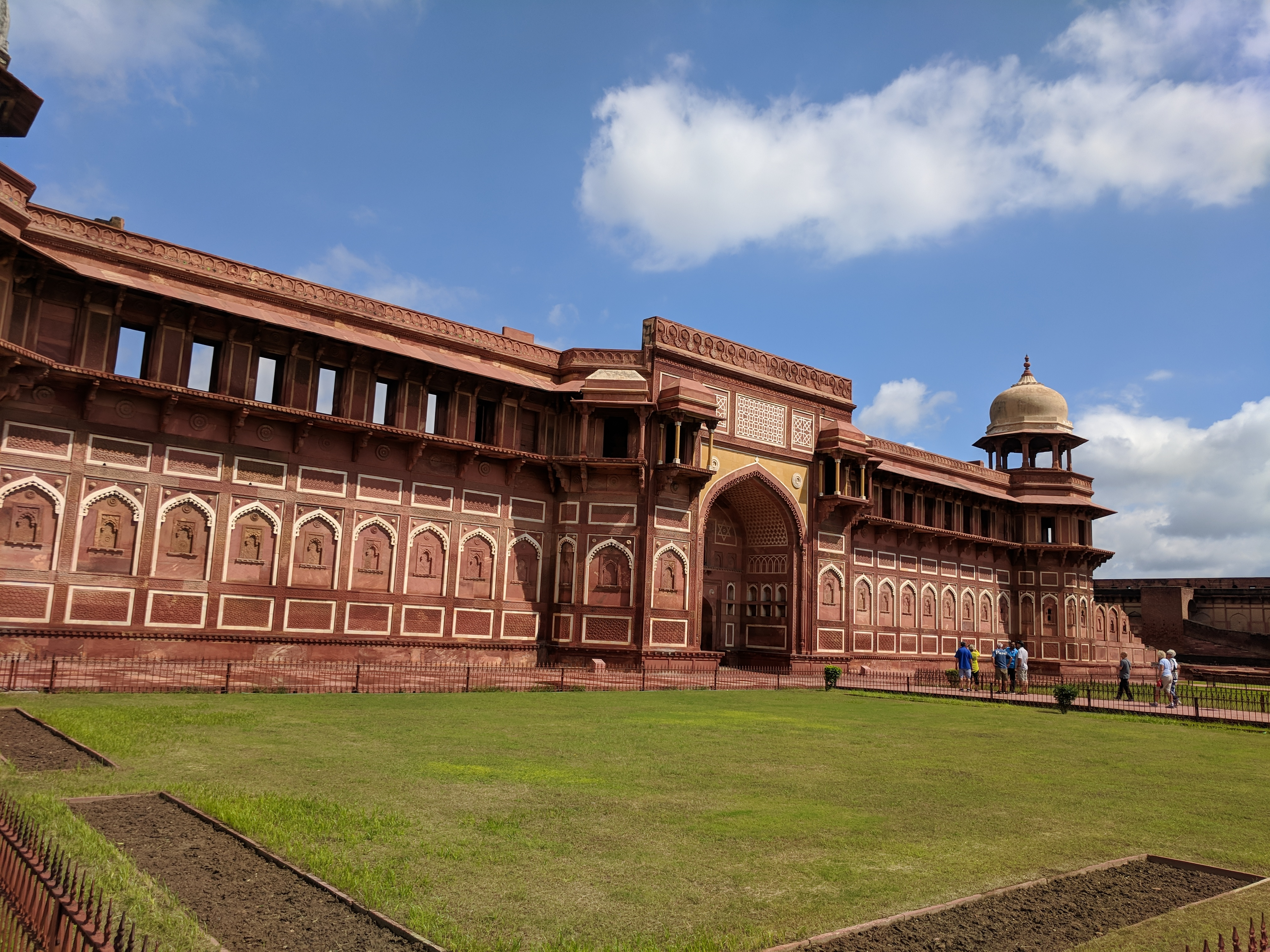
The 16th century Jahangiri Mahal at the Agra Fort has a four-centred arched gateway flanked by four-centred blind arches.

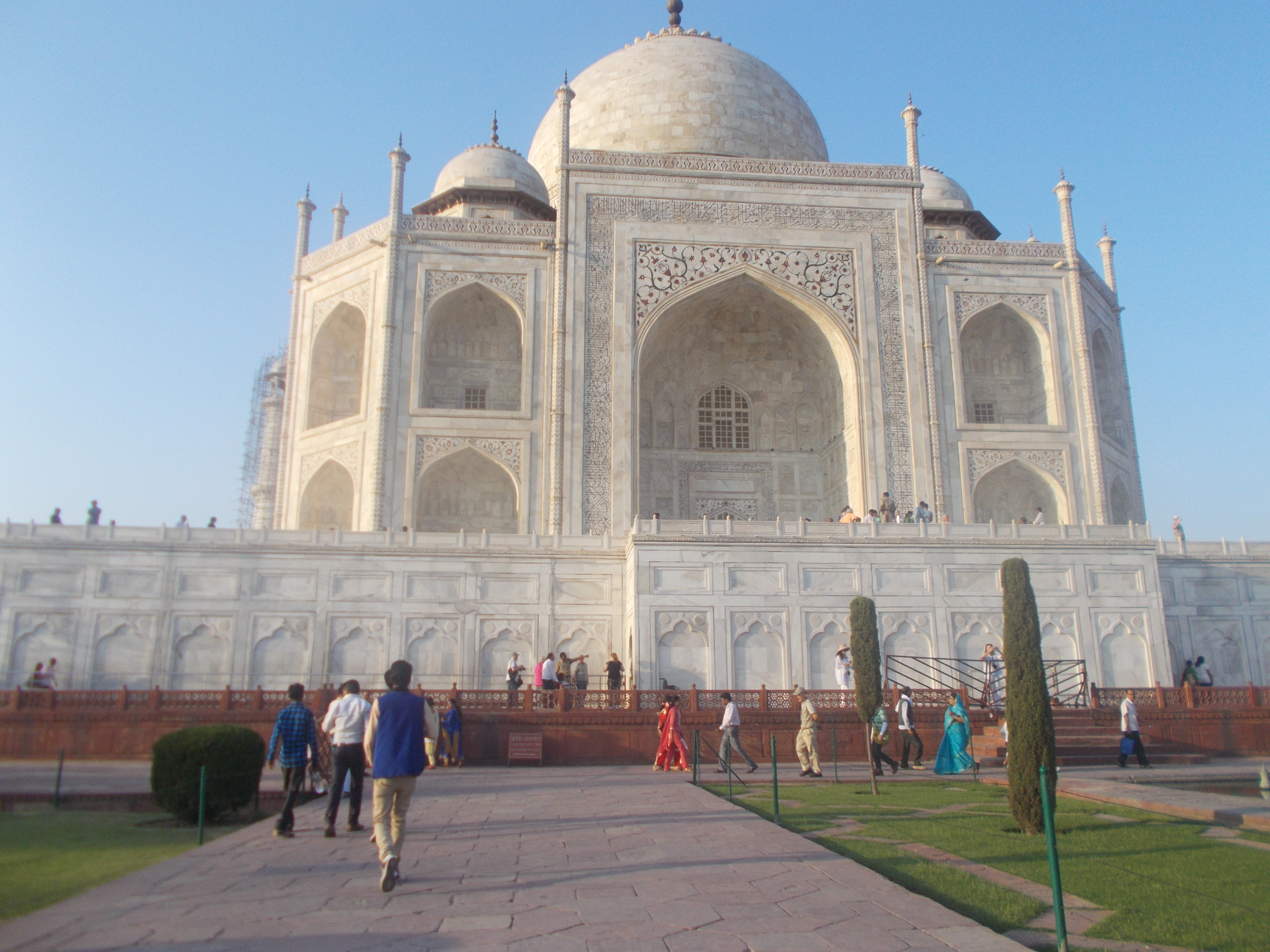
The 17th century Taj Mahal mausoleum of Mumtaz Mahal in Agra.

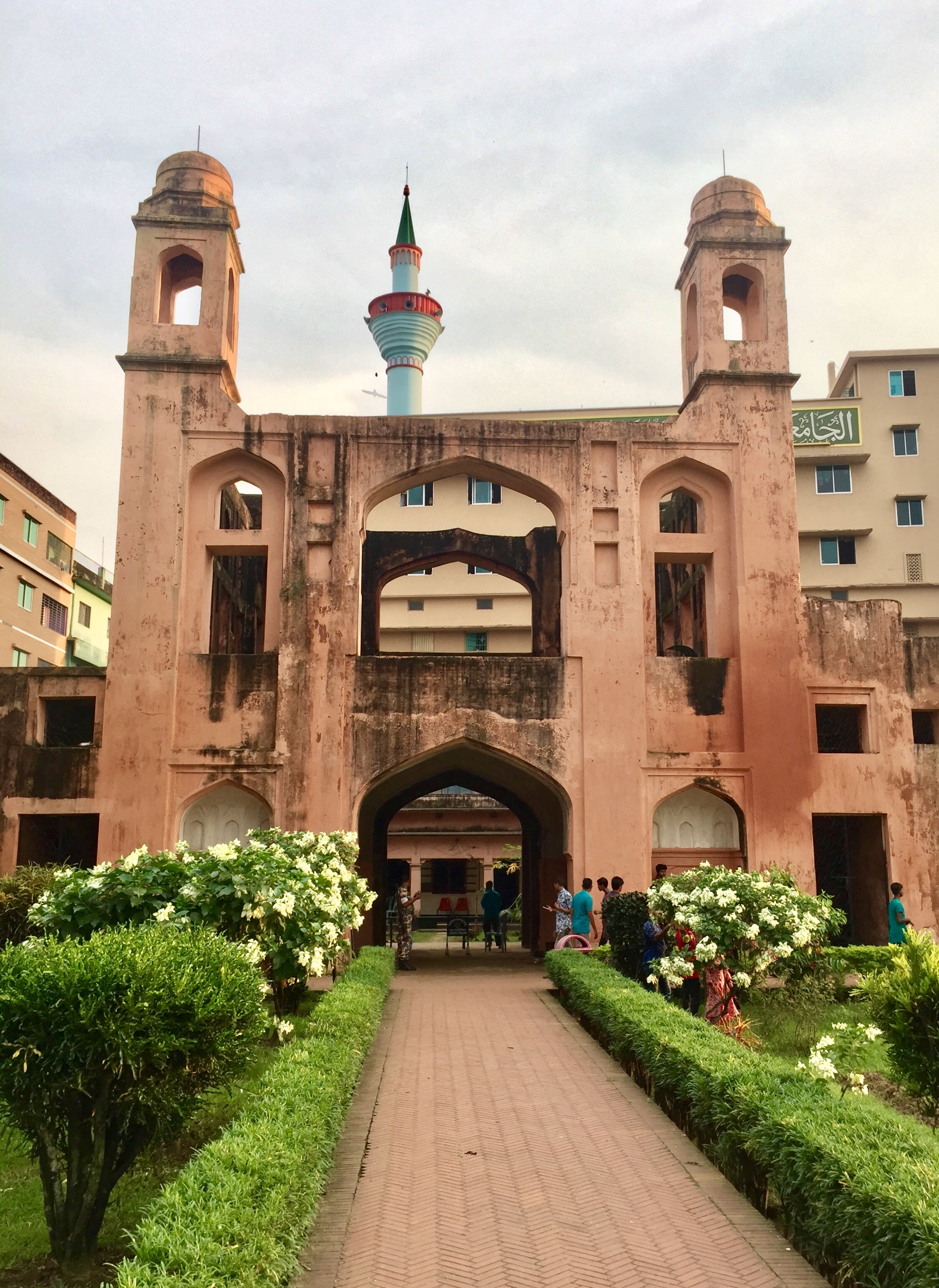
The 17th century south-eastern gateway of the Lalbagh Fort in Dhakkar.

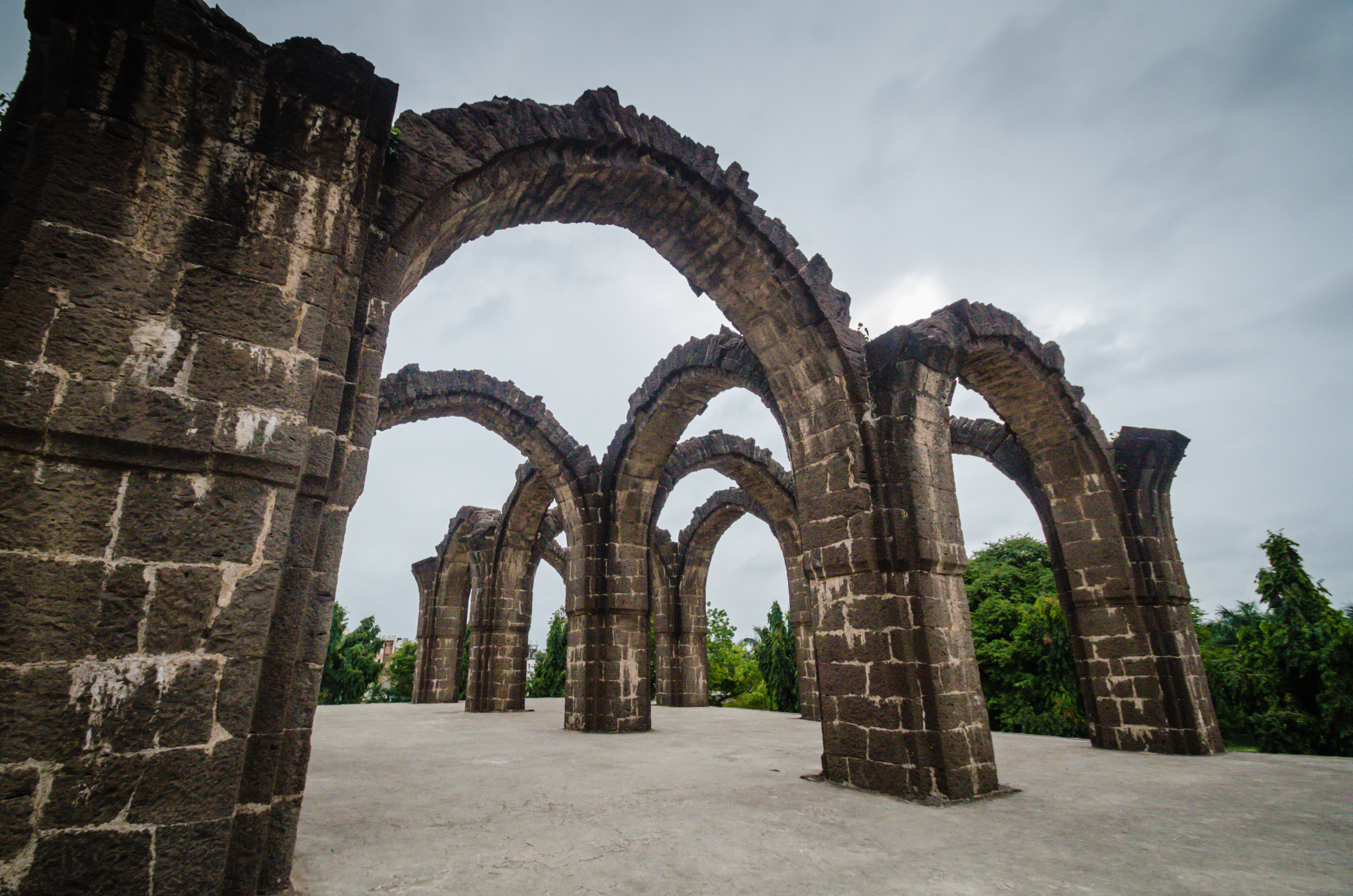
The 17th century Bara Kaman mausoleum of Ali Adil Shah II in Bijapur.

== Use in English architecture ==
In English architecture, the Tudor arch is a version of the four-centred arch that was a common architectural element during the reigns of the Tudor dynasty (1485–1603), though its use predates 1485 by several decades, and from about 1550 it was out of fashion for grand buildings. It is a blunted version of the pointed arch of Gothic architecture, of which Tudor architecture is the last phase in England. A Tudor arch differs slightly from a true four-centred arch in having two straight sides instead of large shallow curves.

The Tudor arch was especially used for doorways, where it gives a wide opening without taking too much space above, compared to a more pointed two-centred arch. This first appeared on a major scale in the west porch of Winchester Cathedral, of uncertain date but likely mid-fourteenth century. In Tudor architecture of the grander sort it is so used when the window openings are rectangular, as for example at Hampton Court Palace.

A notable early example is the west window of Gloucester Cathedral. There are three royal chapels and one chapel-like Abbey which show the style at its most elaborate: King's College Chapel, Cambridge; St George's Chapel, Windsor; Henry VII's Chapel at Westminster Abbey, and Bath Abbey. However, numerous simpler buildings, especially churches built during the wool boom in East Anglia and the Cotswolds, also demonstrate the style.

When employed to frame a large church window, it lends itself to very wide spaces, decoratively filled with many narrow vertical mullions and horizontal transoms. The overall effect produces a grid-like appearance of regular, delicate, rectangular forms with an emphasis on the perpendicular, characteristic of the style, known as Perpendicular Gothic in England, of the 15th and early 16th centuries. This is very similar to contemporary Spanish style in particular. In buildings such as Hampton Court the Tudor arch is found together with the first appearance of Renaissance architecture in England, much later than in Italy. In the later period it is generally only used for major decorative windows, perhaps in an oriel window, or a bay window supported on a bracket or corbel.

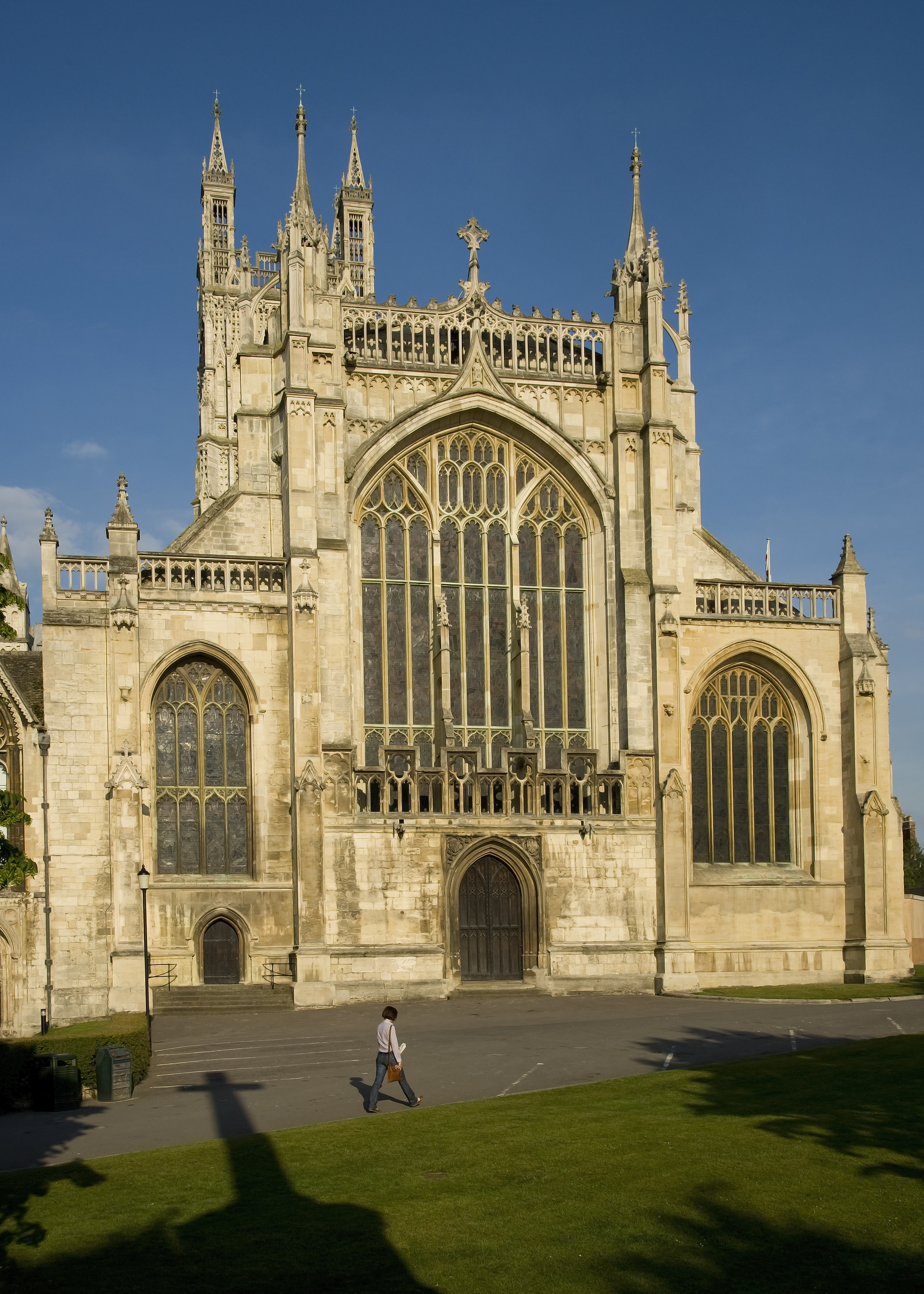
Gloucester Cathedral, west window, c. 1420

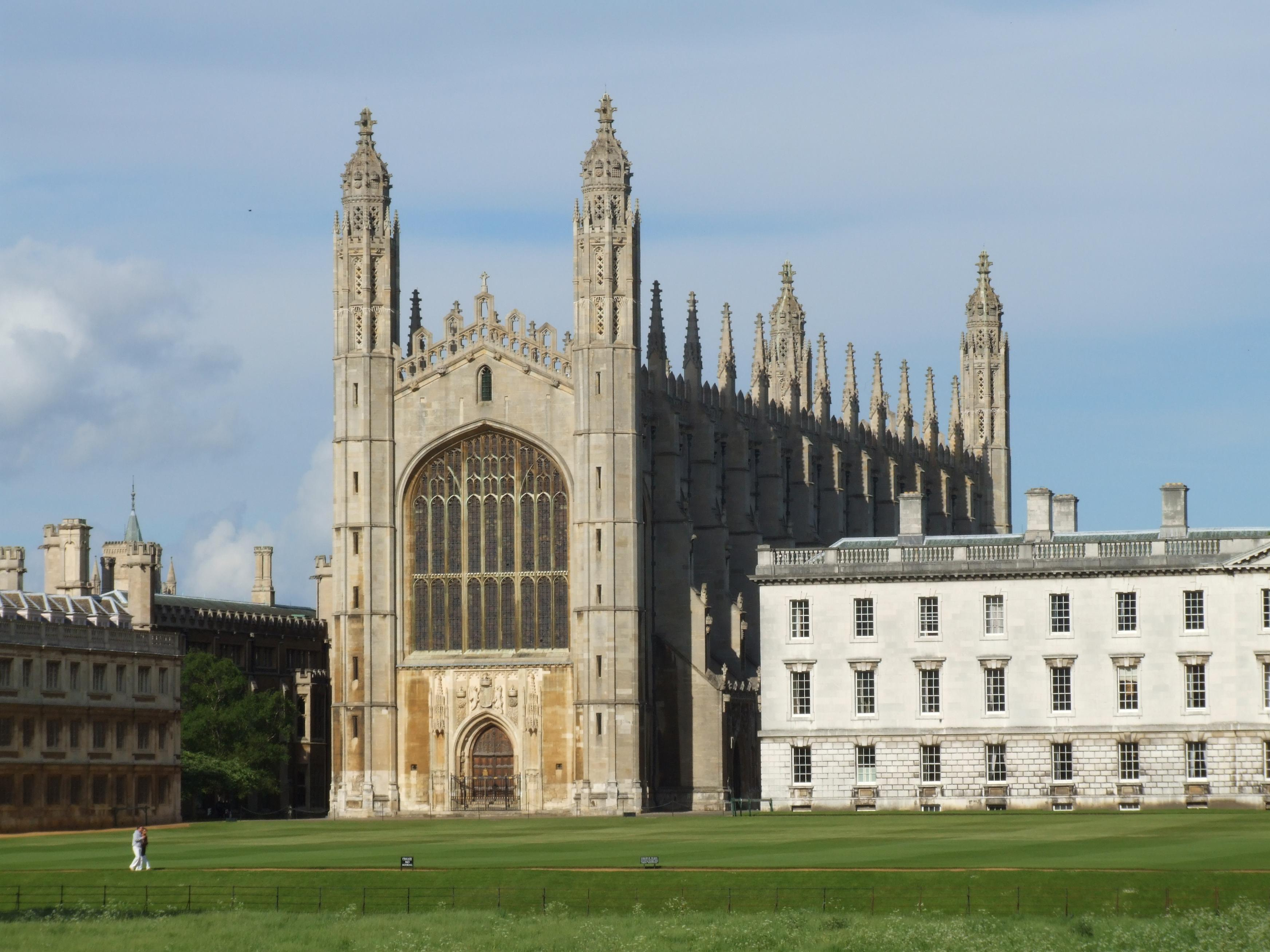
King's College Chapel, Cambridge, begun 1446

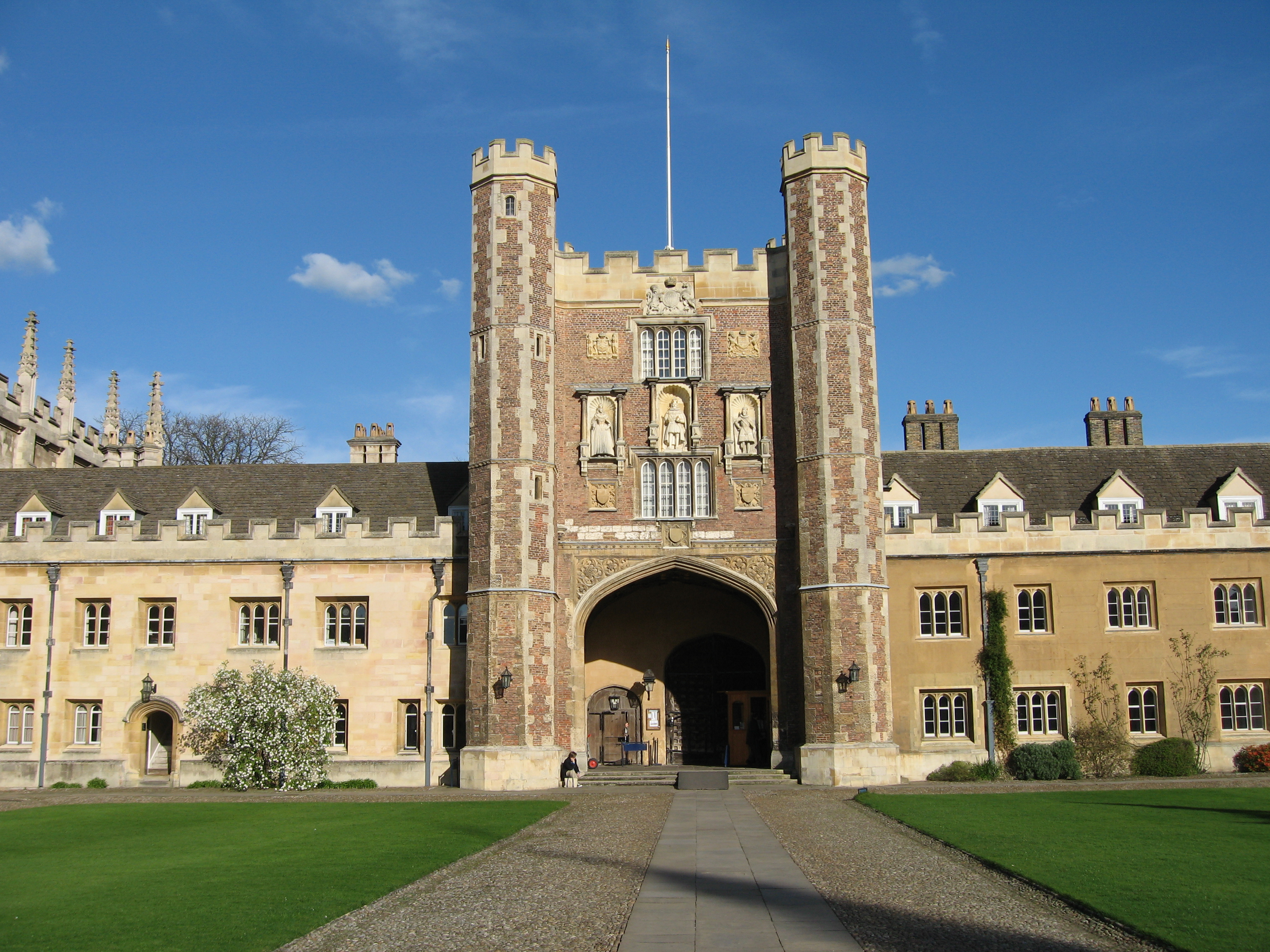
Great Gate, Trinity College, Cambridge (inside), 1519–35

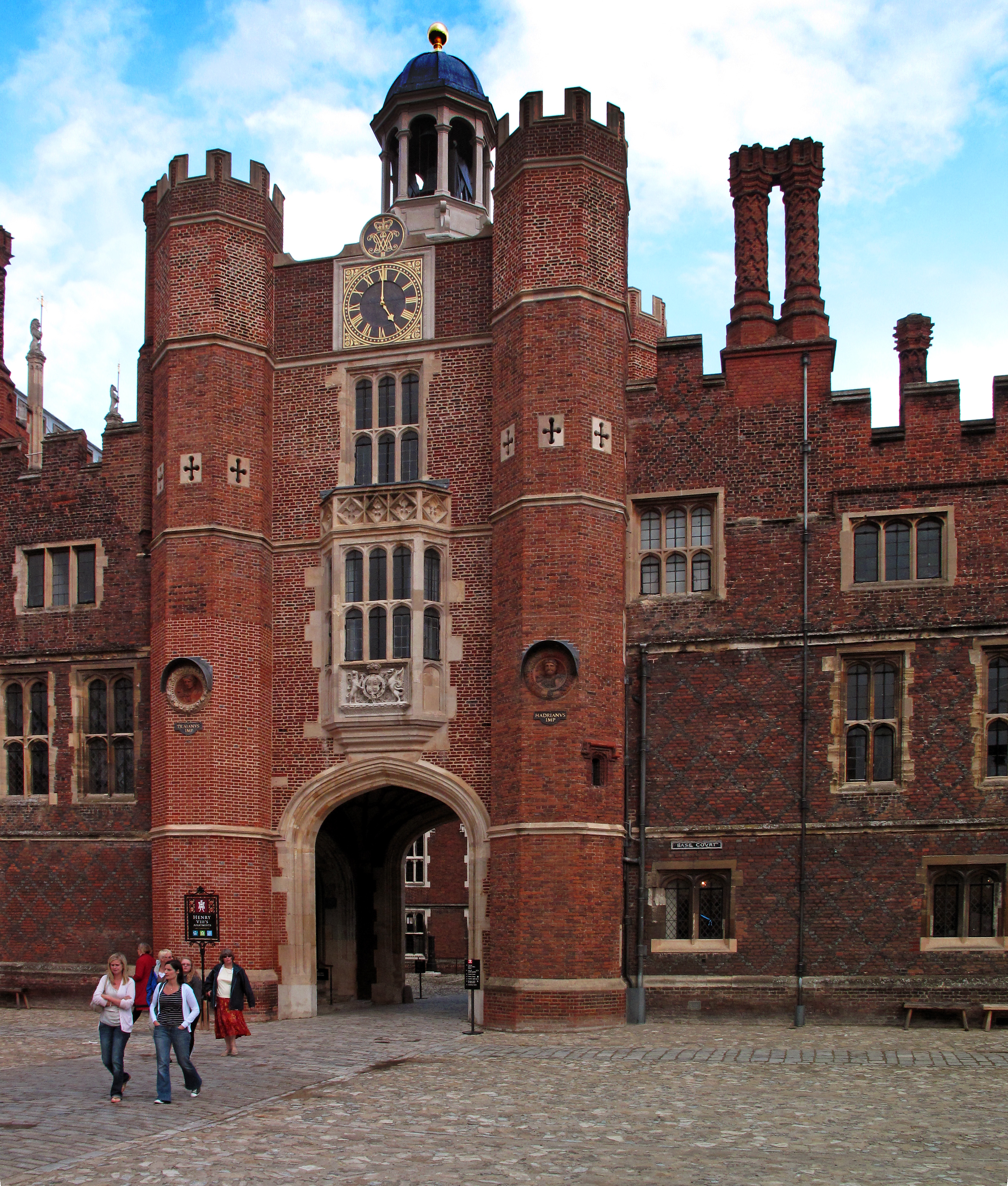
Clock Court gatehouse, Hampton Court Palace, c. 1520

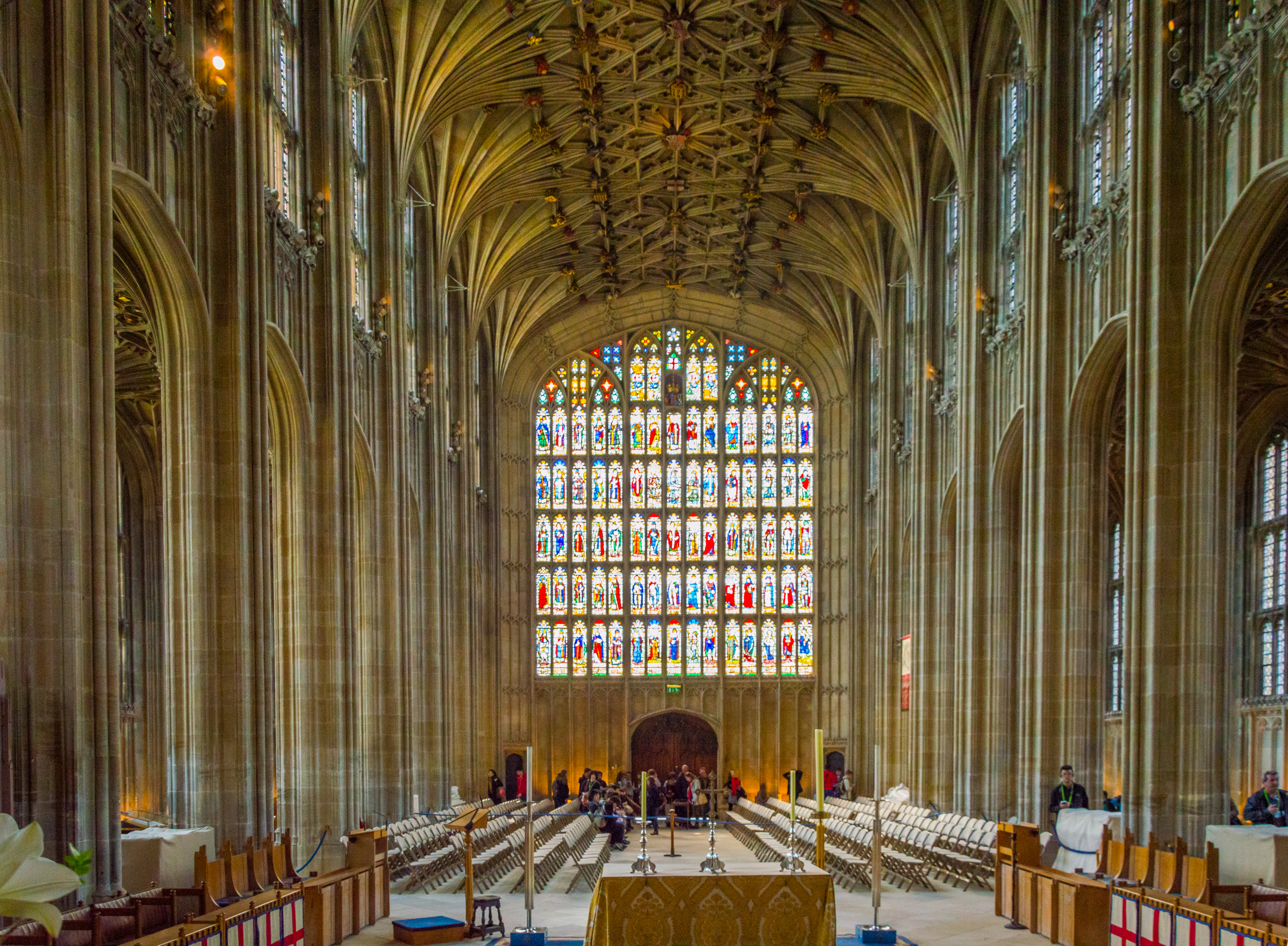
St. George's Chapel, Windsor, east window, 1475–1528

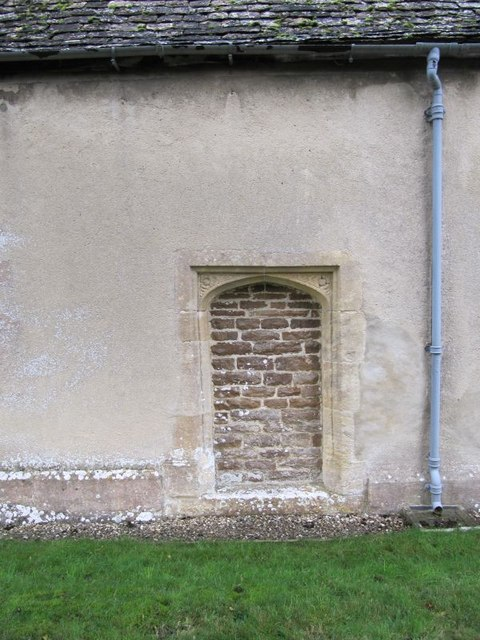
Small doorway, now blocked, in a church
