= Hardev =

Hardev is an Indian masculine given name borne by:

- Hardev Bahri (1907–2000), Indian linguist, literary critic and lexicographer
- Hardev Singh Coonar (1933–2019), Indian dental surgeon
- Hardev Dilgir (1939–2022), Indian lyricist
- Hardev Singh Laddi (born 1968), Indian politician
- Talwinder Singh Parmar or Hardev Singh Parmar (1944–1992), Indian militant, Sikh separatist and mastermind of the 1985 Air India Flight 182 bombing
- Hardev Singh (1954–2016), Indian spiritual guru
