= List of people from Amritsar =

This is a list of notable people from the Indian city of Amritsar, Punjab.

== Spiritual leaders ==
- Guru Hargobind, 6th Guru of Sikhs
- Guru Tegh Bahadur, 9th Guru of Sikhs
- Nawab Kapur Singh, Sikh leader
- Sanaullah Amritsari, Islamic scholar of the Ahl-e-Hadith movement
- Qazi Abdur Rehman Amritsari, historian and writer

== Freedom fighters ==
- Saadat Bano, independence activist and poet
- Saifuddin Kitchlew, freedom fighter
- Madan Lal Dhingra, independence activist

== Defense personnel ==
- Baba Deep Singh, General
- Bhagat Singh Thind, US Sikh Leader
- Sam Manekshaw, Field Marshal
- Saurabh Kalia, soldier

== Sportspersons ==
- Abhishek Sharma, cricketer
- Bishan Singh Bedi, cricketer
- Dara Singh, wrestler and actor
- Ghulam Mohammad Baksh, wrestler
- Madan Lal, cricketer
- Ramandeep Singh, footballer
- Ashok Malhotra
- Gursharan Singh
- Sarandeep Singh
- Vinay Choudhary
- Harvinder Singh
- Sharad Lumba
- Chandan Madan
- Vijay Mehra (Indian cricketer)

== Politicians ==
- Manmohan Singh, 13th Prime Minister of India
- Navjot Singh Sidhu, politician
- Raghunandan Lal Bhatia, politician
- Krishan Kant, 10th Vice-President of India
- Raj Kumar Verka, politician
- Laxmi Kanta Chawla, politician

== Entertainers ==
- Akshay Kumar, actor
- Amrinder Gill, Punjabi singer
- Aneet Padda, actress
- Bharti Singh, Indian stand-up comedian
- Chandan Prabhakar, comedian
- Deepa Mehta, Indo-Canadian filmmaker
- Deepti Naval, actress
- Geeta Bali, actress
- Gurpreet Ghuggi, Punjabi Comedian
- Gurshabad, Playback Singer and actor
- Jeetendra, actor
- Kapil Sharma, comedian
- Majnu, actor and director
- Mahendra Kapoor, playback singer
- Maurice Barrymore, (patriarch of the Barrymore acting family)
- Mohammed Rafi, recording artist
- Narendra Chanchal, singer
- Pramod Moutho, Indian actor
- Prem Dhillon, Punjabi singer
- Rajesh Khanna, actor
- Richa Chadda, actress
- Sahila Chadha, actress
- Shamshad Begum, classical singer
- Sudesh Lehri, comedian
- Veeru Devgan, director and producer of Hindi films
- Vinod Mehra, actor
- Vipul Mehta, singer
- Wadali Brothers(singer)
- Waris Ahluwalia, model, actor in US
- Yash Johar, director and producer of Hindi films

== Writers ==
- Abdul Hameed, writer
- Bhisham Sahni, Hindi writer
- Dalbir Chetan, Punjabi short-story writer
- Ghulam Abbas, writer
- M. D. Taseer, Urdu poet
- Rupa Bajwa, writer
- Saadat Hasan Manto, writer
- Vir Singh, Punjabi poet
- Qazi Abdur Rehman Amritsari, Urdu poet and writer who proposed the name of Pakistan's new capital city Islamabad.

== Scientists ==
- Suresh Rattan (born 1955), biogerontologist

== Others ==
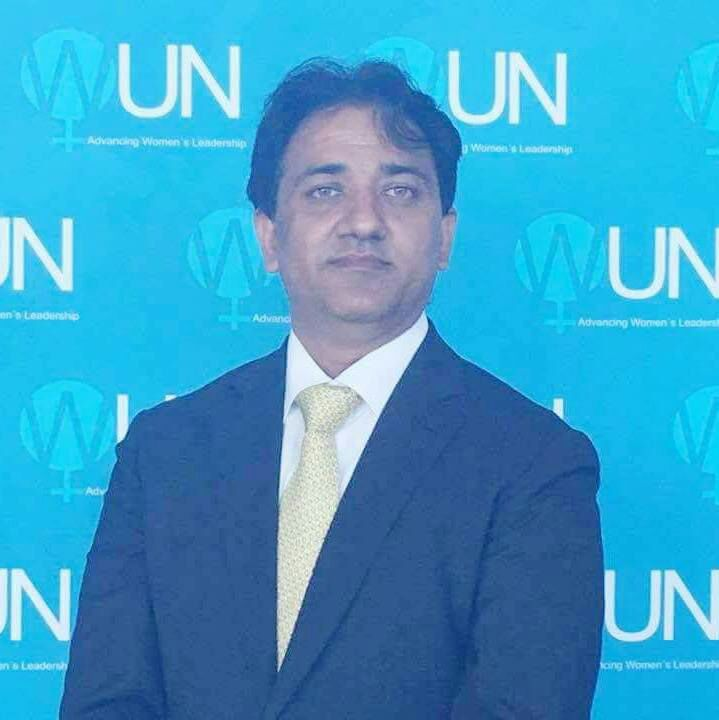
Shammi Rana, Indian sports executive and administrator

- Bhagat Puran Singh, environmentalist
- Hans Raj Khanna, Judge at the Supreme court of India
- Kiran Bedi, First woman IPS officer
- Ritu Kumar, Fashion Designer
- Shammi Rana, Indian sports executive and administrator
- Vikas Khanna, chef
- Gursharan Singh (1929 – 2011), theatre director and playwright

== See also ==
- List of people by India state
