= Sabala =

Sabala may refer to:

People

- Sabała (1809–1894), Polish Goral musician and storyteller
- Julio Sabala (born 1964), Dominican comedian
- Valērijs Šabala (born 1994), Latvian footballer

Other

- Sabala Organization, an NGO based in India
