= Bijapur =

- City
- Vijayapura
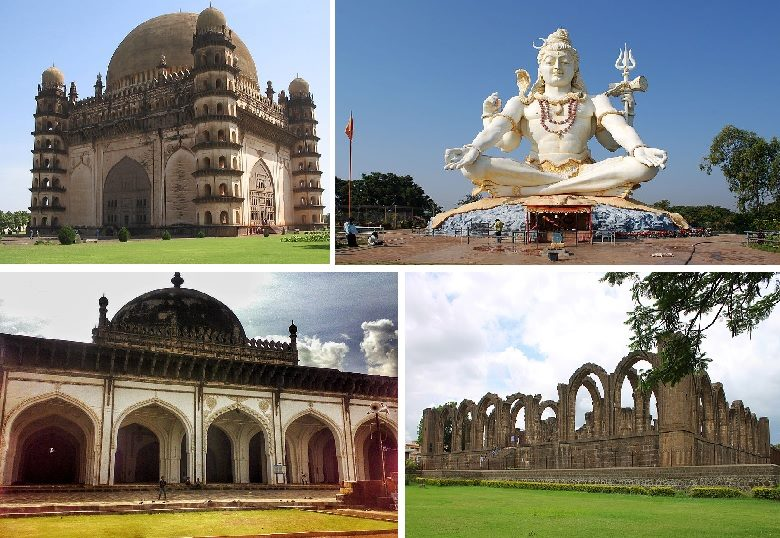
- Clockwise from top: Gol Gumbaz, Shivagiri Monument, Bara Kaman, Jama Mosque.
- Nickname: City of victory
- Interactive map of Bijapur
- Coordinates: 16.83°N 75.71°E
- Country: India
- State: Karnataka
- District: Bijapur
- Established: 10th-11th centuries

Government
  - Type: City Municipal Corporation
  - Body: Vijayapura Mahanagara Palike (VMP)
  - Commissioner: Badruddin Saudagar

Area
  - Total: 102.38 km^{2} (39.53 sq mi)
- Elevation: 592.23 m (1,943.0 ft)

Population (2011)
  - Total: 326,360
  - Rank: 9th (Karnataka)
  - Density: 3,187.7/km^{2} (8,256.2/sq mi)
- Demonym(s): Vijayapurian, Bijapuri
- Time zone: UTC+5:30 (IST)
- PIN: 586101-xxx109
- Telephone code: 08352
- ISO 3166 code: IN-KA
- Vehicle registration: KA-28
- Official language: Kannada
- Website: www.vijayapuracity.mrc.gov.in

Bijapur (officially Vijayapura) is the district headquarters of the Bijapur district of the Karnataka state of India. It is also the headquarters for Bijapur Taluk. Bijapur city is well known for its historical monuments of architectural importance built during the rule of the Adil Shahi dynasty. It is also well known for the popular Karnataka premier league team, the Bijapur Bulls. Bijapur is located 519 km (322 mi) northwest of the state capital Bengaluru and about 550 km (340 mi) from Mumbai and 210 km (130 mi) north east of the city of Belgaum.

The city was established in the 10th–11th centuries during the time of Kalyani Chalukyas and was known as Vijayapura (city of victory). The city was passed to Yadavas after Chalukya's demise. In 1347, the area was conquered by the Bahmani Sultanate. After the split of the Bahmani Sultanate, the Bijapur Sultanate ruled from the city. Relics of the Sultanates' rule can be found in the city, including the Bijapur Fort, Bara Kaman, Jama Masjid, and Gol Gumbaz.

Bijapur, one of the popular heritage cities in Karnataka, is also one of the top ten populated cities in Karnataka. Bijapur city was declared as one of the corporations in the state of Karnataka in 2013. Bijapur urban population as per 2011 census was 326,000, perhaps the 9th biggest city in Karnataka. Vijayapura Mahanagara Palike (VMP) is the newest Municipal Corporation formed under the KMC act, along with Shimoga and Tumkur Municipal Corporations. Administratively, Bijapur district comes under Belgaum division, along with Bagalkote, Belgaum, Dharwad, Gadag, Haveri and Uttara Kannada (Karwar) districts.

Civic administration of the city is managed by the Bijapur City Corporation and office of Deputy Commissioner in Bijapur. The office of Deputy Commissioner has the responsibility for rural areas in Bijapur, while the corporation administers the city of Bijapur. Effective administration of the heritage city of Bijapur is the main purpose of the Vijayapura City Corporation.

== History ==
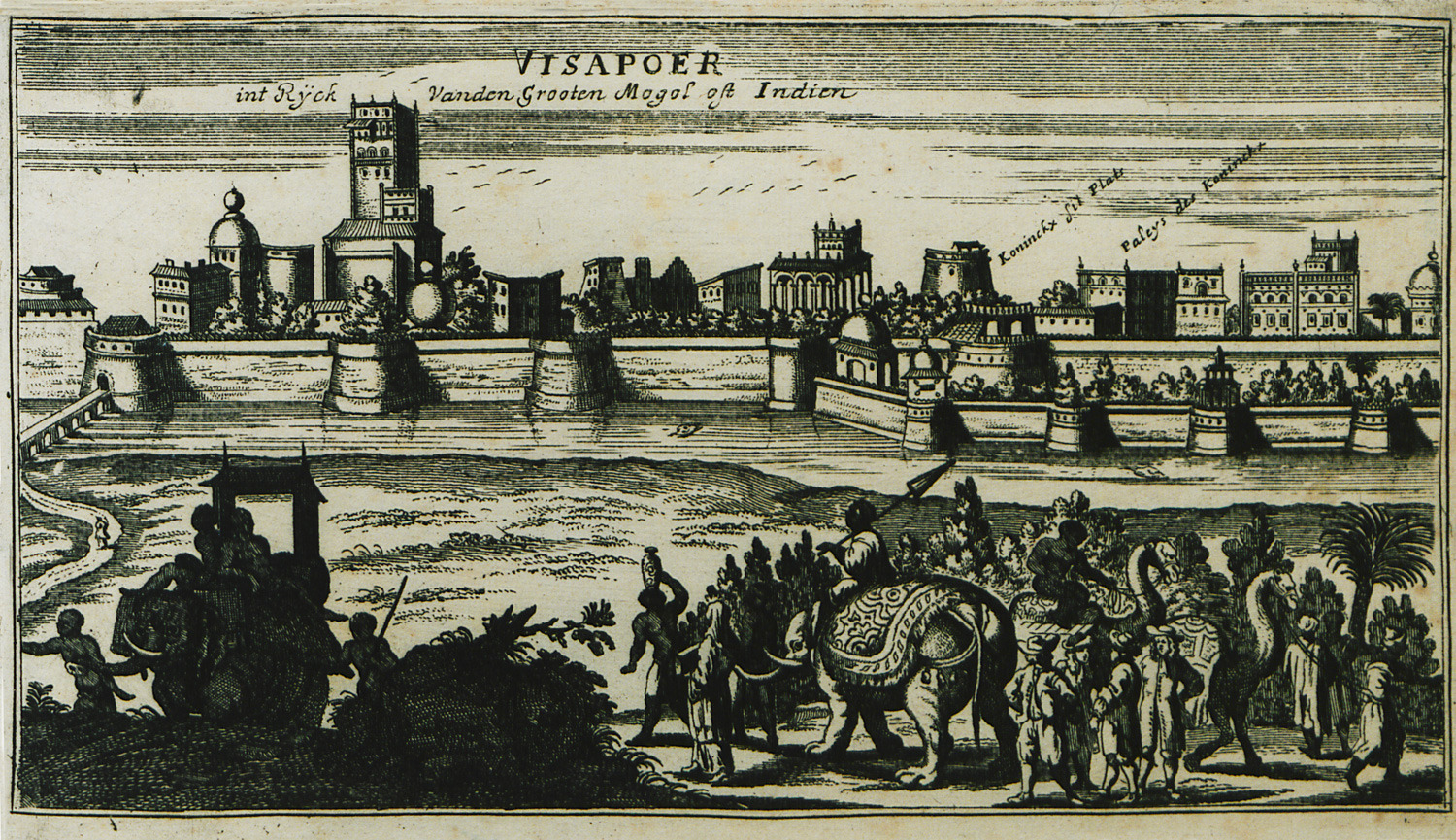
"Visapoer", 1690

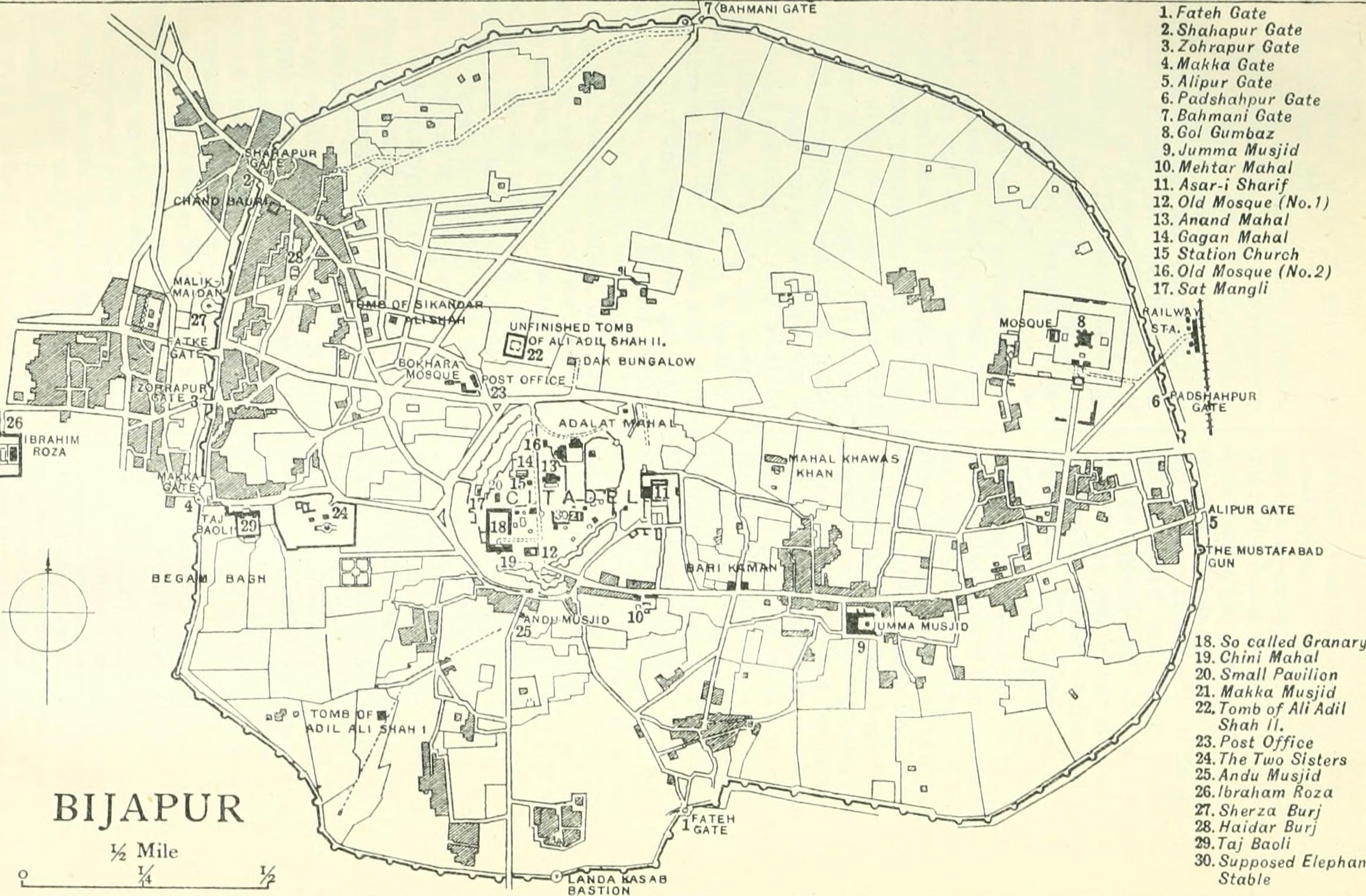
Plan of Bijapur, 1911

=== Early history ===
The Bijapur district is historically, traditionally and legendarily, one of the richest districts in the state. Evidence found here reveals that it was an inhabited place since the Stone Age. The history of this district is divided into four periods, from the Chalukya acquisition of Badami till the Muslim invasion.

The early Western Chalukya period lasted from about 535 to about 757; the Rastrakuta period from 757 to 973; the Kalachuri and Hoysala period from 973 to about 1200; the Devagiri Yadava period from 1185 to the Muslim conquest of Devagiri in 1312.

=== Bahmani and Bijapur Sultanates ===
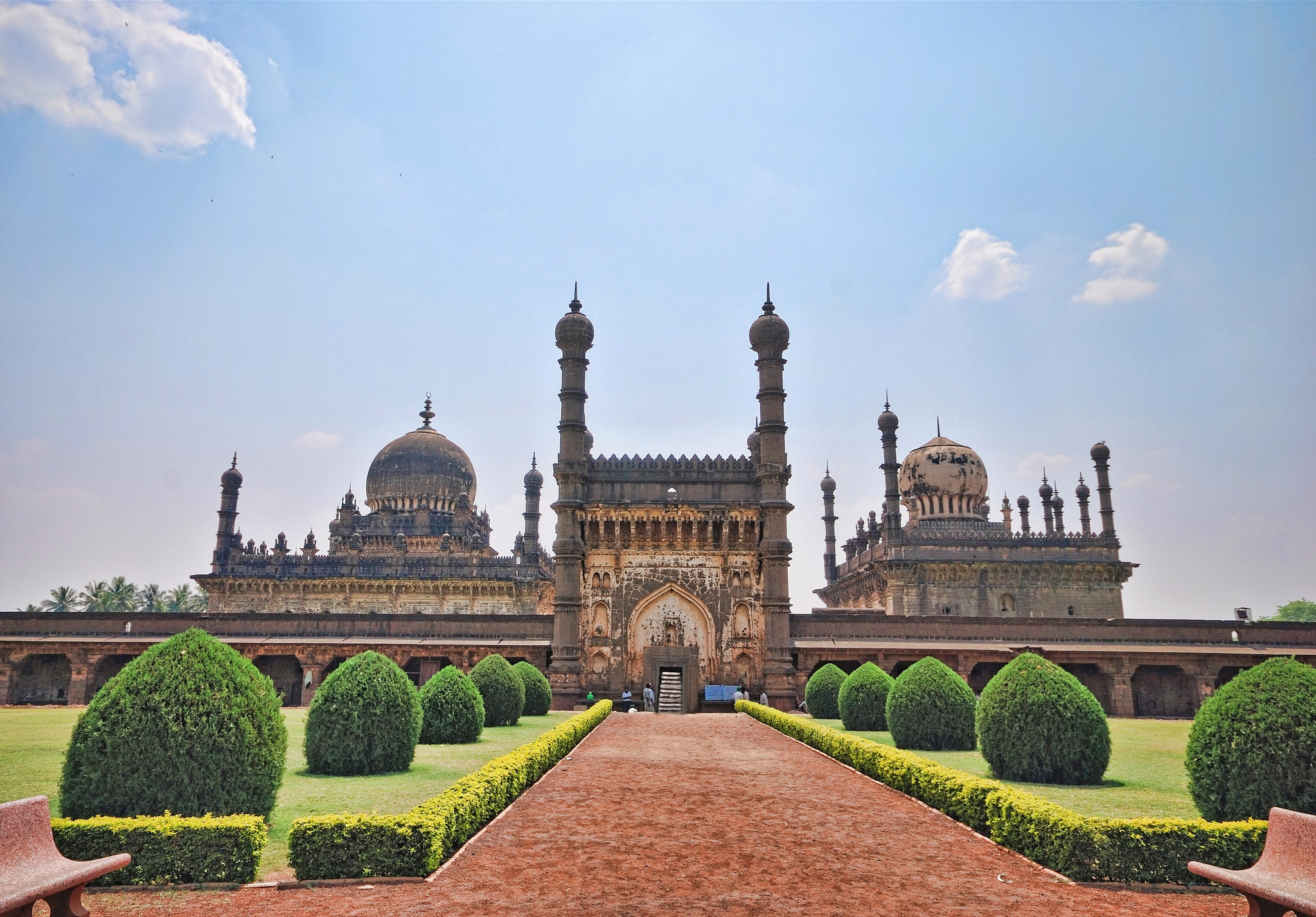
Ibrahim Rauza, completed in 1626 is the burial place of Ibrahim Adil Shah II and his family

Bijapur first came under the influence of Alauddin Khalji, the Sultan of Delhi, towards the end of the 13th century, and then under the Bahmani Sultanate in 1347. In 1347, when the Bahamani Sultanate was established, it included the southern and eastern parts of Bijapur district. The Sultanate was divided into several provinces, (tarafs) including Bijapur. The capital of the province was Bijapur, with boundaries extending to present parts of North Karnataka south and west of Maharashtra including the Konkan, and was a centre for trading overseas. The supremacy of the Bahmanis and authority over its provinces ceased by 1490. At that time five dynasties were born, and one of them was the Adil Shahi dynasty. In 1518, the Bahmani Sultanate formally split into five splinter states known as the Deccan sultanates, ruled by the aforementioned five dynasties. The sultans of the Bijapur Sultanate ruled from 1490 to 1686. The city of Bijapur owes much of its greatness to Yusuf Adil Shah, the founder of the independent state of Bijapur, sultan Ali Adil Shah I, who fortified the city and grew its working class population, and Ibrahim Adil Shah II of Bijapur. At its peak under the Bijapur Sultanate in the early 17th century, half a million to a million people were estimated to have inhabited the city.

The Mughal emperor Aurangazeb conquered Bijapur from the Adil Shahis in 1686 and had two years prior turned Bijapur into a subah. Disease and other natural events resulting in large-scale death following the Mughal conquest significantly reduced the city's population. Bijapur was under Mughal rule up to 1723. In 1724 the Nizam of Hyderabad State established his independence in the Deccan and included Bijapur within his dominion. However, his acquisition on this portion was of brief duration, and in 1760 it went into the hands of the Maratha Confederacy.

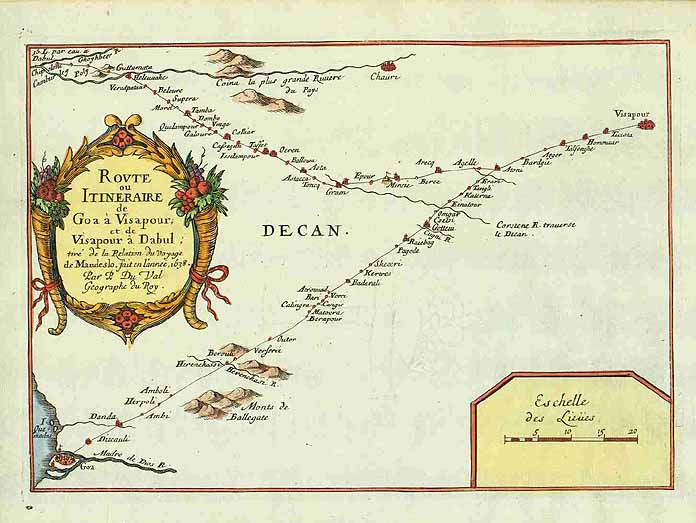
Trade routes through the Deccan, connecting Bijapur to Goa and Dabhol (1666 French map)

=== British Colonial period ===
After the 1818 defeat of the Peshwa by the British in the Third Anglo-Maratha War, Bijapur passed into the hands of the British East India Company, and was assigned to the Maratha princely state Satara.

In 1817, war broke out between the British and the Marathas. By 1818, the whole of Bijapur was occupied by the British and was included in the territory assigned to the Raja of Satara. In 1848 the territory of Satara was obtained through the failure of heir and the British rule started. Till 1884, the Bijapur district had headquarters at Kaladagi. Bijapur was made headquarters in 1885.

=== Post-Independence ===
After Independence, the movement for re-organisation of States gained further momentum and on 1 November 1956 a separate "Mysore State" was formed. By the wish of the people it was renamed as "Karnataka". Thus, the district Bijapur along with other Kannada speaking areas became a part of "Karnataka State" on 1 November 1956.

Central government had approved the request to rename the city in October 2014 from Bijapur to "Vijayapura" on 1 November 2014.

== Geography ==
Bijapur is located 519 km from the state capital Bengaluru, 163 km from Kalaburagi, 196 km from Hubli, 212 km from Belagavi. Bijapur has a semi-arid climate. It is located at 16.83°N 75.7°E. It has an average elevation of 606 metres (1988 ft). The district has two types of soil. The first is "deep black soil" (or yeari bhoomi), which is good for the crops like jawar, wheat, pulses, sunflower, sugarcane etc. The major portion of the district consists of this kind of soil which has a great moisture-holding capacity. The second type is "red soil‟ (or masari /maddi bhoomi), which is generally poor, good for irrigation and horticulture.

sugarcane farming on vijayapura Bagalkot highway

Krishna river is the most important river of the district. It flows about 125 miles in the district. A dam is built across the river at Almatti. Bhima river flows in northern part of district for about 20 miles. It overflows in the rainy season and spreads over a wider area, which is thereby rendered extremely fertile land. In central part of district Doni river flows.

=== Climate and temperature ===
The climate of Bijapur district is generally dry and healthy. In summer, especially in April and May, it is very hot; at that time the temperature lays between 40-degrees Celsius to 42-degrees Celsius. In the winter season, from November to January, the temperature is between 15-degrees Celsius to 20-degrees Celsius. Usually the district has dry weather, so the humidity varies from 10% to 30%. The district has 34 rain gauge stations. The average annual rainfall for the whole district is 552.8 mm, with 37.2 rainy days. The monsoon generally reaches the district by June and lasts till October. Though the total rainfall is not high, the district benefits both from the south-west and the north-east monsoons. The annual rainfall varies from place to place within the district.

Climate data for Bijapur (1991–2020, extremes 1901–2020)
Month	Jan	Feb	Mar	Apr	May	Jun	Jul	Aug	Sep	Oct	Nov	Dec	Year
Record high °C (°F)	39.4 (102.9)	41.1 (106.0)	41.9 (107.4)	43.3 (109.9)	44.9 (112.8)	43.0 (109.4)	36.9 (98.4)	36.5 (97.7)	37.4 (99.3)	37.3 (99.1)	35.0 (95.0)	34.6 (94.3)	44.9 (112.8)
Mean daily maximum °C (°F)	30.7 (87.3)	33.5 (92.3)	36.8 (98.2)	38.8 (101.8)	39.1 (102.4)	33.6 (92.5)	30.9 (87.6)	30.6 (87.1)	31.2 (88.2)	31.4 (88.5)	30.5 (86.9)	29.8 (85.6)	33.1 (91.6)
Mean daily minimum °C (°F)	15.3 (59.5)	17.4 (63.3)	21.2 (70.2)	23.8 (74.8)	23.9 (75.0)	22.6 (72.7)	22.0 (71.6)	21.5 (70.7)	21.4 (70.5)	20.6 (69.1)	17.7 (63.9)	14.6 (58.3)	20.3 (68.5)
Record low °C (°F)	6.4 (43.5)	8.9 (48.0)	11.2 (52.2)	15.8 (60.4)	17.8 (64.0)	17.2 (63.0)	16.1 (61.0)	16.7 (62.1)	16.1 (61.0)	11.8 (53.2)	5.6 (42.1)	6.0 (42.8)	5.6 (42.1)
Average rainfall mm (inches)	2.0 (0.08)	1.0 (0.04)	7.3 (0.29)	27.2 (1.07)	46.7 (1.84)	100.8 (3.97)	78.6 (3.09)	92.9 (3.66)	134.7 (5.30)	132.0 (5.20)	19.5 (0.77)	4.7 (0.19)	647.4 (25.49)
Average rainy days	0.1	0.1	0.9	1.7	3.5	5.6	5.6	6.1	7.8	6.0	1.5	0.3	39.1
Average relative humidity (%) (at 17:30 IST)	35	29	26	28	33	57	66	65	63	56	49	41	46
Source: India Meteorological Department

== Description ==
The city consists of three distinct portions: the citadel, the fort and the remains of the city. The citadel, built by the Adilshahi Sultans, a mile in circuit, is of great strength, well built of the most massive materials, and encompassed by a ditch 100 yards (91 m) wide, formerly supplied with water. The fort, which was completed by the Adilshahi Sultans in 1566, is surrounded by a wall 6 m. in circumference. This wall is from 30 to 50 ft (15 m) high, and is strengthened with ninety-six massive bastions of various designs. In addition there are ten others at the various gateways. The width is about 25 ft (7.6 m); from bastion to bastion runs a battlement curtained wall about 10 ft (3.0 m) high. The whole is surrounded by a deep moat 30 to 40 ft (12 m) broad. Inside these walls the Bijapur kings bade defiance to all comers. Outside the walls are the remains of a vast city, now for the most part in ruins, but the innumerable tombs, mosques, which have resisted the havoc of time, afford abundant evidence of the ancient splendor of the place. Badami, Aihole, and Pattadakal, near Bijapur, are noted for their historical temples in the Chalukya architectural style.

Bijapur is nearly 530 km (330 mi) from the state capital Bengaluru. It lies between latitude 15.20 and 17.28 north and longitude 74.59 and 76.28 east. It is situated well in the interior of the Deccan Peninsula and is about 130 miles away from the west coast.

The district is bounded by Solapur district to the north and Sangli district to the north-west, Belgaum district on the west, Bagalkot district to the south, Gulbarga district, Yadgir District to the east and Raichur District to the south-east.

== Sufis of Bijapur ==
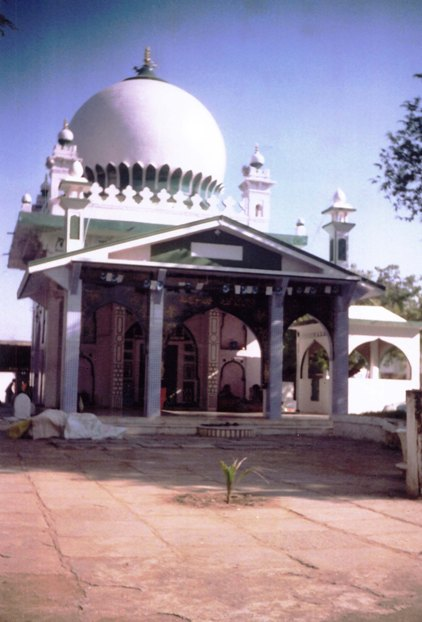
Tomb or Dargah of Sufi Saint Hazrat Murtuza Quadri located at western side Bijapur

Arrival of Sufis in the Bijapur region was started during the reign of Qutbuddin Aibak. During this period Deccan was under the control of native Hindu rulers and Palegars. Shaikh Haji Roomi was the first to arrive in Bijapur with his companions. Although his other comrades like Shaikh Salahuddin, Shaikh Saiful Mulk and Syed Haji Makki were settled in Pune, Haidra and Tikota respectively.

According to Tazkiraye Auliyae Dakkan i.e., Biographies of the saints of the Deccan, compiled by Abdul Jabbar Mulkapuri in 1912–1913,

Sufi Sarmast was one of the earliest sufi of this region. He came to the Deccan from Arabia in the 13th Century at a time when the Deccan was a land of unbelievers with no sign of Islam or correct faith anywhere. His companions, pupils (fakir), disciples (murid), and soldiers (ghazi), numbered over seven hundred. He settled in Sagar in Solapur district. There, a zealous and anti-Muslim raja named Kumaram (Kumara Rama) wished to expel Sufi Sarmast, and his companions having also prepared to a struggle, a bitter fight ensued. Heroes on both sides were slain. Finally the raja was killed by the hand of his daughter. Countless Hindus were killed, and at this time Lakhi Khan Afghan and Nimat Khan came from Delhi to assist him. Hindus were defeated and the Muslims were victorious. The rest of the Hindus, having accepted tributary status, made peace. Since by nature he was fundamentally not combative, Sufi Sarmast spread the religion of Mohammed and befriended the hearts of Hindus. Having seen his fine virtue s and uncommon justice, many Hindus of that time accepted Islam, finally he died in the year A.H.680 i.e., 1281 A.D.

After this period arrival of Sufis in Bijapur and suburbs was started. Ainuddin Gahjul Ilm Dehelvi narrates that Ibrahim Sangane was one of the early Sufis of Bijapur parish. Sufis of Bijapur can be divided into three categories according to period of their arrival viz., Sufis before Bahmani and / or Adil Shahi Dynasty, Sufis during Adil Shahi Dynasty and Sufis after the fall of Adil Shahi Dynasty. And further it can be classified as Sufis as warriors, Sufis as social reformers, Sufis as scholars, poets and writers.

Ibrahim Zubairi writes in his book Rouzatul Auliyae Beejapore (compiled during 1895) which describes that more than 30 tombs or Dargahs are there in Bijapur with more than 300 Khankahs i.e., Islamic Missionary Schools with notable number of disciples of different lineage like Hasani Sadat, Husaini Sadat, Razavi Sadat, Kazmi Sadat, Shaikh Siddiquis, Farooquis, Usmanis, Alvis, Abbasees and other and spiritual chains like Quadari, Chishti, Suharwardi, Naqshbandi, Shuttari, Haidari etc.

== Demographics ==
Historical population
Year	Pop.	±%
1931	39,747	—
1941	48,968	+23.2%
1951	65,734	+34.2%
1961	78,854	+20.0%
1971	103,931	+31.8%
1981	147,313	+41.7%
1991	193,131	+31.1%
2001	253,891	+31.5%
2011	326,360	+28.5%

Religions in Bijapur City (2011)
Religion	Percent
Hinduism	62.12%
Islam	35.56%
Jainism	1.14%
Other or not stated	1.18%
Distribution of religions

Bijapur City had a population of 326,360 population as per census 2011. Males constitute 51% of the population and females 49%. Bijapur has an effective literacy rate of 83.43%, higher than the national average of 74%; with male literacy of 88.92% and female literacy of 77.86%. 12% of the population is under 6 years of age. Kannada is the major language spoken here.

Languages of Bijapur city (2011)
1. Kannada (51.4%)
2. Urdu (34.4%)
3. Marathi (5.38%)
4. Lambadi (3.85%)
5. Hindi (2.01%)
6. Telugu (1.17%)
7. Others (1.81%)

At the time of the 2011 census, 51.43% of the population spoke Kannada, 34.35% Urdu, 5.38% Marathi, 3.85% Lambadi, 2.01% Hindi and 1.17% Telugu as their first language.

== Transport ==
=== Road ===
Bijapur is connected to major cities by the four-lane NH-13 (Solapur–Mangalore) (now NH50), NH-218 (Hubli–Humnabad) and other state highways. The main stand in Bijapur is near the southwestern side of the citadel, near the city center. Bus services to Badami, Belgaum, Almatti, Gulbarga, Bidar, Hubli, Solapur and Sangli, Miraj are frequent. Bijapur is a road transport hub and its state-run bus transport division has 6 depots/units and comes under Kalyana Karnataka Road Transport Corporation (KKRTC) headquartered at Gulbarga. The division runs multi-axle coaches, sleeper coaches, and sitting push-back coaches with AC and Non-AC options from makers like Volvo, Mercedes-Benz, Isuzu, Tata Motors, Ashok Leyland, and Mitsubishi on services to Bengaluru, Mumbai, Pune, Hyderabad, Mangalore, Mysore, Hubli, Belgaum and other major cities.

=== Railways ===
Bijapur is well connected by rail with Bengaluru and other major cities of India (Mumbai, Hyderabad, Ahmedabad, Hubli and Solapur). It has its own railhead that is located just 2 km (1.2 mi) from the main town.

Bijapur railway station is connected by a broad-gauge railway (Gadag–Hotgi railway line) to Hotgi Junction near Solapur railway station and Kurduvadi railway station on Central Railway towards the north and to Bagalkote and Gadag junction on South Western Railway towards the south. Bijapur is connected with direct trains to Solapur, Bagalkote, Gadag, Dharwad, Ballari, Yeswanthpur (Bengaluru), Hubli, Mumbai, Hyderabad and Ahmedabad. Bijapur comes under Hubli division of South Western Railway (SWR)

Direct railway line to Gulbarga and Belgaum

Bijapur–Shahabad is a proposed new railway line (via Devar Hippargi, Sindgi, Jewargi) and was sanctioned in the state budget of 2010–11.

Bijapur–Shedbal is a proposed new railway line (via Tikota, Athani, Shedbal) survey has been completed and submitted to South Western Railway Hubli.

GoK's intention is to develop Bijapur - Gulbarga belt as a cement & steel hub, which has created a need for a direct railway line between Bijapur and Shahabad. This would also be able to carry coal from the Jharkhand and Singareni collieries for NTPC's 4000 MW Power Project in Kudagi (Basavana Bagewadi Taluk). The Bijapur–Shahabad line would run 156.60 km (97.31 mi) and be under the South Western Railway. Partial private sector financing is required; however, state government will contribute two-thirds of the project cost of the railway line, which is estimated at Rs. 12 billion over the first five years, in a role as an investor in return for a share in the profits.

A similar proposal has been made for sugar belt on the Bijapur Athani Belgaum new line, which will also provide shorter connectivity from Goa to Solapur, Gulbarga, Bidar, Nagpur, Kolkata. The line would run 112.3 km (69.8 mi) and be under South Western Railway, if project is taken into consideration it will be on 50:50 cost sharing basis on both state and railways.

=== Air transport ===
The nearest airport is at Gulbarga (152 km). Many airlines connect Bijapur to the rest of India via this airport. A greenfield airport which can accommodate ATR 72 & Airbus 320 (expansion afterwards) is currently being built by the Karnataka government. The land has already been acquired. Bijapur Airport will be built by the Karnataka State Industrial and Infrastructure Development Corporation (KSIIDC) at a cost of Rs 220 crore. The project site is located 15 km from the city on 727-acre (2.94 km^{2}) of land in Madhubavi villages. The construction has started and airport is expected to be ready by February 2024

== Education ==
Bijapur is emerging as a hub for professional education. Before the 1980s, there were very few professional educational institutions. Along with the professional colleges there are many colleges which provide under-graduate and post-graduate degrees in the faculty of applied science, pure science, social-sciences and humanities.

Engineering colleges are affiliated to Visvesvaraya Technological University viz, B.L.D.E.A's V.P. Dr. P.G. Halakatti College of Engineering and Technology and SECAB College of Engineering and Technology.

Al Ameen Medical college is affiliated to Rajiv Gandhi University of Health Sciences.

The first women's university in the state of Karnataka is located at Bijapur. Various post-graduate courses like MBA, MCA are conducted here. Bijapur also has BLDE (deemed to be university, a deemed university of health sciences recognised by the UGC.

=== Karnataka State Women's University ===
Karnataka State Women's University, established in 2003 in Bijapur, is the only university in Karnataka dedicated exclusively for women's education. It is recognised under 2(f) and 12(B) of the UGC Act. Seventy women's colleges spread in twelve districts of North-Karnataka are affiliated to this university.

=== IGNOU Bijapur Regional Center ===
Bijapur has IGNOU regional center, There are 7 districts under its jurisdiction (districts Bagalkote, Bijapur, Bidar, Gulbarga, Koppal, Raichur and Yadagiri). The newly created Bijapur Regional Centre would cater to seven northern districts.

== Sports ==
=== Cricket ===
At the inaugural auction of Karnataka Premier League (KPL), Bijapur Bulls was one of the eight teams that were formed. Bijapur Bulls represent the Gulbarga zone of Karnataka State.

Women's international cricket player Rajeshwari Gayakwad is from Bijapur.

=== Cycling ===
Bijapur is well known for its cycling culture. Cyclists from the city have won numerous accolades including medals in the State Mini Olympics.

== See also ==
- List of films shot in Bijapur
- List of rulers of Bijapur
- Bhāskara II
- Lakkundi
- Arakeri, Bijapur
- Sabala Organization
- List of people from Bijapur
