= List of Indian dentists =

This is a list of notable Indian dentists on the basis of their academic accomplishments and innovations in the field of dentistry.

== List of notable Indian dentists ==
- Rafiuddin Ahmed
- S. M. Balaji
- Meiyang Chang
- Harpinder Singh Chawla
- Hardev Singh Coonar
- Jagannathrao Hegde
- Kaumudi Joshipura
- Anil Kohli
- Sajeev Koshy
- Atluri Sriman Narayana
- Tabitha Solomon
- Vimla Sood
- Amrit Tewari
- Mahesh Verma
