= Sabala Organization =

Sabala is a NGO based in Bijapur, India and has a primary focus on the "empowerment of women", including the tribal Lambani, through enabling financial freedom, political voice, social acceptance, and educational opportunities.

== History ==
In 1986, Mallamma Yalawar founded the Sabala Organization.

== Initiatives ==
=== Sabala Handicrafts ===
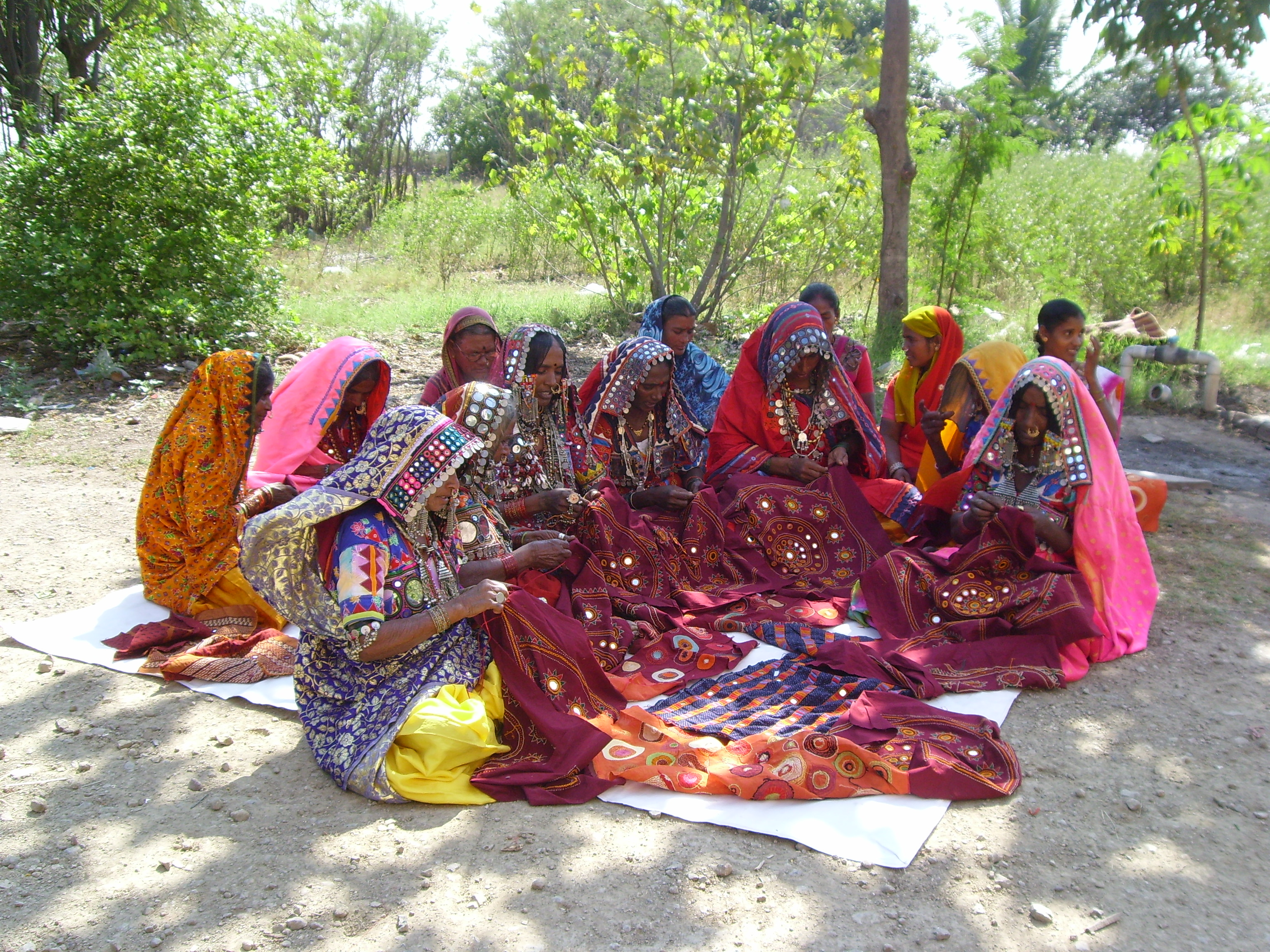
Lambani women employed by Sabala working on embroidery.

The social enterprise, Sabala Handicrafts was created to provide economic opportunities to the Lambanies (Banjaras) and all other marginalized women. Sabala Handicrafts is organized as a linked enterprise and is run through their craft center. The women become artisans through training in the art of embroidery, weaving and or sewing. Although the Craft Center is the head of the operations, much of the work is done villages of the locals as the Sabala Handicraft team transports materials and finish goods throughout the area. This allows the artisans to tend to their households and children while maintaining employment.

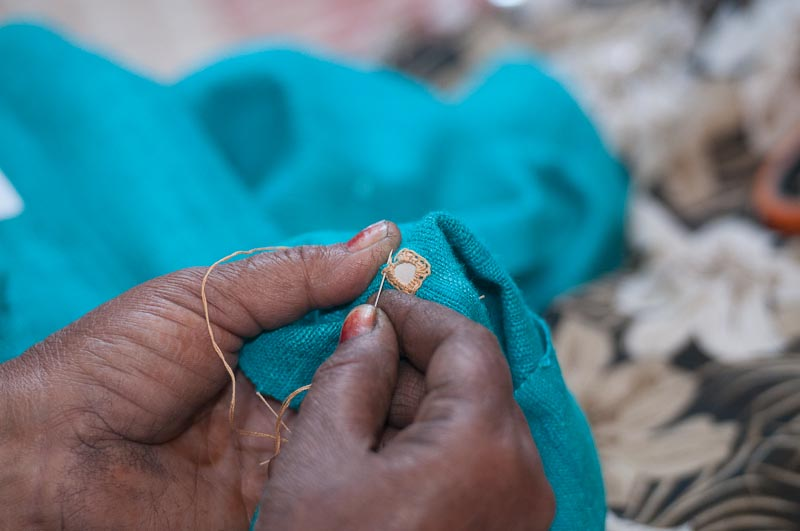
Hand stitching

=== Self-Help Groups ===
The Sabala organization has set up numerous self-help groups for women in the region. They function on a weekly meeting schedule and allow women to take loans, pool money and combat social issues. The social issues they discuss and combat include land entitlement, woman’s rights, child labor, domestic violence, and child marriage.

=== Geetanjali Model School ===
Geetanjali Model School was founded in 1998. Since 1998 more than 4000 students have graduated from Geetanjali Model School.

=== Chaitanya Mahila Sahakari Bank ===
Chaitanya Mahila Sahakari bank is a bank for women. Any woman who has reached the age of 18 can become a member. The bank is licensed by the Reserve Bank of India and has about 8500 women shareholders. The bank was established to provide financial facilities to women who otherwise would not have access and has resulted the ability for women obtain financial freedom. The bank has established four branches in addition to the head office in Bijapur. The 50.000 customers contribute to a turnover of 320 cores, the Share Capital makes 2.3 cores.
