= Shammi Rana =

Indian sports promoter (born 1978)

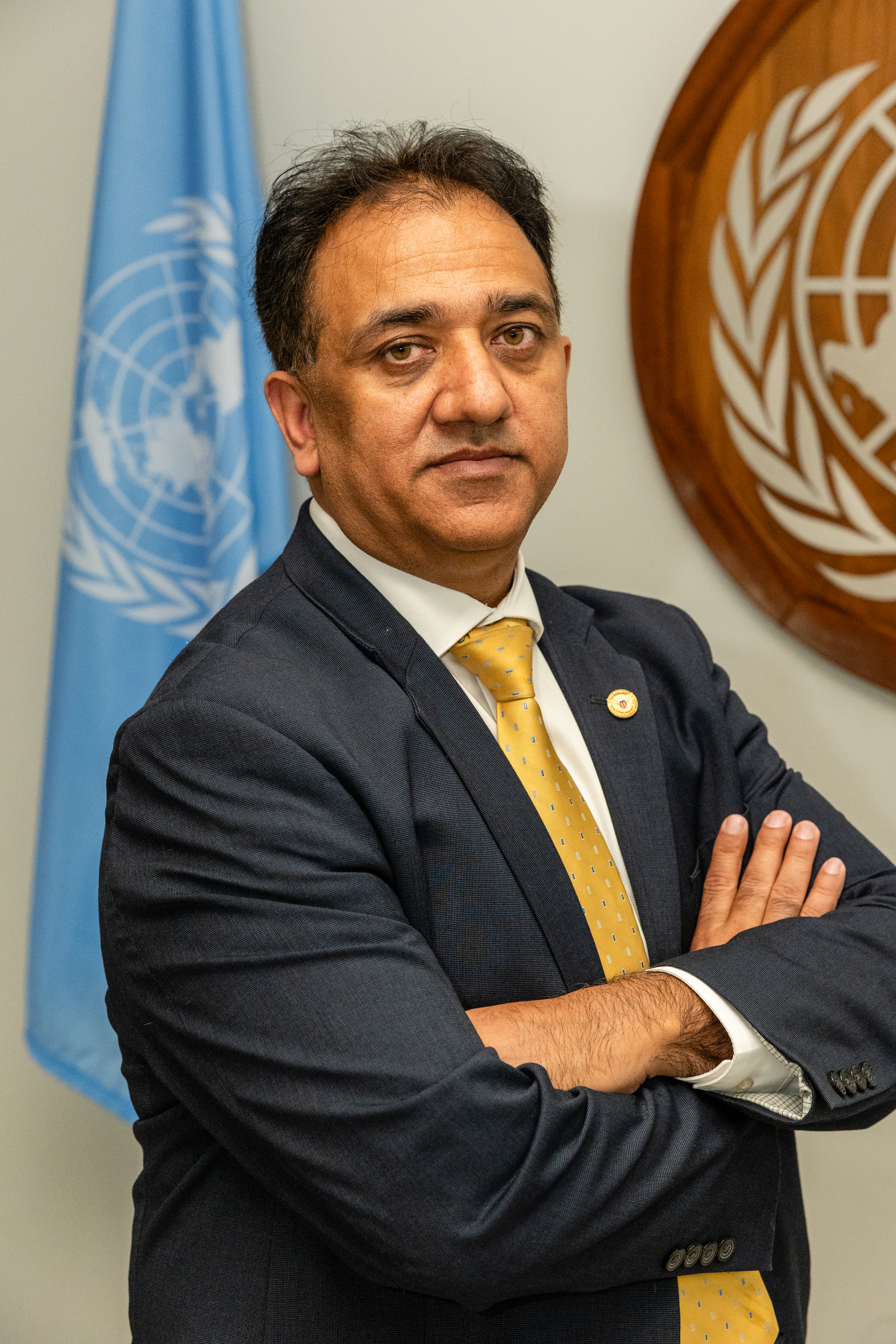
- Born: 24 November 1978 (age 47); Amritsar, Punjab India
- Notable work: CEO International Council of Traditional Sports and Games

Shammi Rana is an Indian sports promoter associated with Traditional Sports and Games (TSG). He was appointed Secretary-General of the International Council of Traditional Sports and Games (ICTSG) at the 4th UNESCO Collective Consultation of Traditional Sports and Games. Shammi Rana was also appointed Rapporteur of Traditional Sports and Games by UNESCO in the 3rd Collective Consultation on the Safeguarding and Promotion of Traditional Sports and Games 2017.

In March 2025, Shammi Rana, CEO of the International Council of Traditional Sports and Games (ICTSG), participated in a high-level event hosted by the United Nations Office of Counter-Terrorism (UNOCT) at the UN Headquarters in New York. The event, titled "Securing the Legacy: Debriefing from Paris 2024 for Future Major Sporting Events," marked the 5th anniversary of UNOCT’s Global Sports Programme and focused on enhancing the security, inclusivity, and long-term legacies of future international sporting events.

Shammi Rana is the CEO of the International Council of Traditional Sports and Games (ICTSG), a California-based nonprofit. He actively participated in the 24th Session of the United Nations Permanent Forum on Indigenous Issues (UNPFII) in April-May 2025, held at the United Nations Headquarters in New York.

Rana took part in a side event focused on the World Games for Indigenous Peoples, where the accomplishments related to Article 31 of the UN Declaration on the Rights of Indigenous Peoples were highlighted. The event, co-hosted by ICTSG and the Comité Intertribal Memória e Ciência Indígena, also featured a preview of the upcoming World Indigenous Games 2025 in Brazil.

Additionally, Rana also participated in another side event on the Commonwealth Sport Declaration, organized by WIN Sports International and the International Organization of Indigenous Resource Development (IOIRD), which focused on supporting Indigenous athletes and cultural initiatives.

In 2026, Shammi Rana, CEO of the International Council of Traditional Sports and Games (ICTSG), attended the Fourth United Nations Counter-Terrorism Week at the United Nations Headquarters in New York. The event was organized by the United Nations Office of Counter-Terrorism and included participation from government representatives, international organizations, and subject matter experts discussing counter-terrorism-related topics. ICTSG’s participation was reported in connection with discussions on sport and community-based initiatives.

== Career ==
Shammi Rana held several positions at various sports organizations worldwide. In 2020, he was honored with a Presidential Award in the USA. Shammi Rana was elected as Secretary-General of Asian Jujitsu and Belt Wrestling Federation in 2009 and attended the 1st Indoor Asian Martial Arts Games as Referee for Ju-jitsu. In 2016, he attended World Martial Arts Masterships as Technical Director for Belt Wrestling.

== Promotional work ==
Shammi has made a lot of effort to promote Traditional Sports Games in UNESCO. He has met with many officials from different countries to promote TSG. He participated in the Canadian parliament and was assured their support for TSG. He visited South Korea with Khalil Ahmed, chairman of the Advisory Committee of TSG UNESCO, and held a meeting with Korean authority authorities for their support and sponsorship of Traditional Sports and Games.

In Africa, he met Sierra Leone deputy sports minister Kai Lawrence Mbayo. Shammi explained the importance of Traditional Sports and the deputy minister assured them of his full support.

He met with Erin Bromaghim, Director of Olympic and Paralympic Development in Los Angeles. Shammi proposed that Traditional Sports and Games should be included in the Olympics 2028, which will be held in Los Angeles. Because of his efforts, the first Worldwide Traditional Sports and Games will be held in Astana, Kazakhstan.

He and Hari Banaag, members of the advisory committee of TSG UNESCO, met with Congressman Terrance John Cox and emphasized founding a Pan-America Traditional Sports and Games Headquarters in Delano, California.

He, along with Vansh Rana from the ICTSG USA Youth Committee and Sartaj Singh Sekhon from the ICTSG USA Advisory Committee, met with Mike Levin, the U.S. representative for California's 49th congressional district, to seek support for the preservation of Traditional Sports and Games.

== Awards and honors ==
- 2021 - USA President's Lifetime Achievement Award
- 2020 - USA President's Lifetime Achievement Award
- 2019 - Honorary Doctorate Degree in Martial Arts Philosophy and Martial Arts Science from the University of Asian Martial Arts Studies (2019)
- USA Martial Arts Hall of Fame Award
- Shammi Rana elected as President of Rising Sun Welfare Society(Regd)
- Shammi Rana honored with FOG Global Icon Award 2024
