= List of people from Thalassery =

This is a list of notable people from Thalassery (IPA: [t̪laʃeɾi]; formerly Tellicherry^{[2]}), a commercial town^{[1]} on the Malabar Coast in Kannur district, in the state of Kerala, India. The town is bordered by the districts of Mahé (Pondicherry) and Kozhikode.

== Notable people from Thalassery ==
- Janaki Ammal (1897-1984), botanist, cytologist, geneticist.
- Ayyathan Janaki Ammal(1881-1945) first female surgeon from Kerala.
- Vainu Bappu (1927–1982), president of the International Astronomical Union who jointly discovered the Wilson-Bappu effect and who helped establish several astronomical institutions in India including the Vainu Bappu Observatory and the modern Indian Institute of Astrophysics.
- M. V. Devan, noted painter, sculptor, and former chairman of Kerala Lalit Kala Akademi.
- Ayyathan Gopalan (1861-1948), Indian physician, social reformer of Kerala, philanthropist, founder of Sugunavardhini movement (1900) and Depressed Classes Mission (1909) in Kerala.
- Hermann Gundert (1814–1893), German missionary and linguist scholar. His works include the first school text book, the first dictionary, and the first newspaper, Rajyasamacharam.
- Rayaroth Kuttambally Krishna Kumar: (18 July 1938 – 1 January 2023) was an Indian business executive who was the director of Tata Sons.
- Moorkoth Kumaran (1874–1941), teacher, short story writer, and the first biographer of Narayana Guru.
- Keeleri Kunhikannan (1858–1939), pioneer of circus in Kerala.
- William Logan (1841–1914), a Scottish historian whose works are considered some of the most reliable historical references of North Malabar by governments and universities.
- O Chandu Menon (1847–1899), author of Indulekha, the first Malayalam classic novel.
- Raghunath Nambiar, former Air Officer Commanding-in-Chief (AOC-in-C), Western Air Command.
- Vengayil Kunhiraman Nayanar (1861–1914), author of the first Malayalam short story, Vasanavikriti.
- N Prabhakaran, writer who has won a Kerala Sahitya Akademi Award.
- Raghavan Master, Malayalam film music composer.
- Moorkoth Ramunni IFAS (1914–2009), first Malayali fighter pilot and later administrator of Lakshadweep.
- Ayesha Rauf (1914-1992), Sri Lankan educator and politician
- C. K. Revathi Amma (1891-1981), Indian social activist of Kerala
- Veera Kerala Varma Pazhassi Raja (1753–1805), leader of resistance in the Cotiote War against the English East India Company.
- Mattannoor Sankarankutty (M.P. Sankarankutty Marar), Chenda percussionist who won the Padma Shri award.
- Njattyela Sreedharan, lexicographer known for compiling a dictionary connecting four major Dravidian languages Malayalam, Kannada, Tamil and Telugu.
- M.N. Vijayan (1930–2007), orator and writer.
