= Bara Kaman =

Coordinates: 16°49′47″N 75°43′5″E

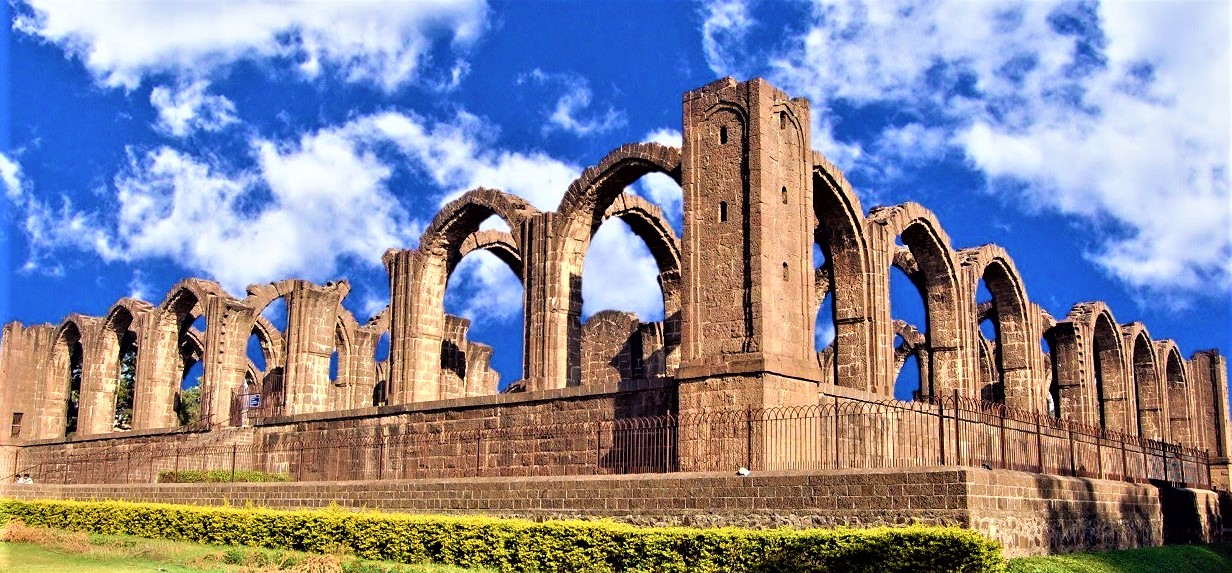
- A file photo of Bara Kaman
- Interactive map of Bara Kaman
- Type: unfinished mausoleum

Site notes
- Architectural style: Indo-Islamic

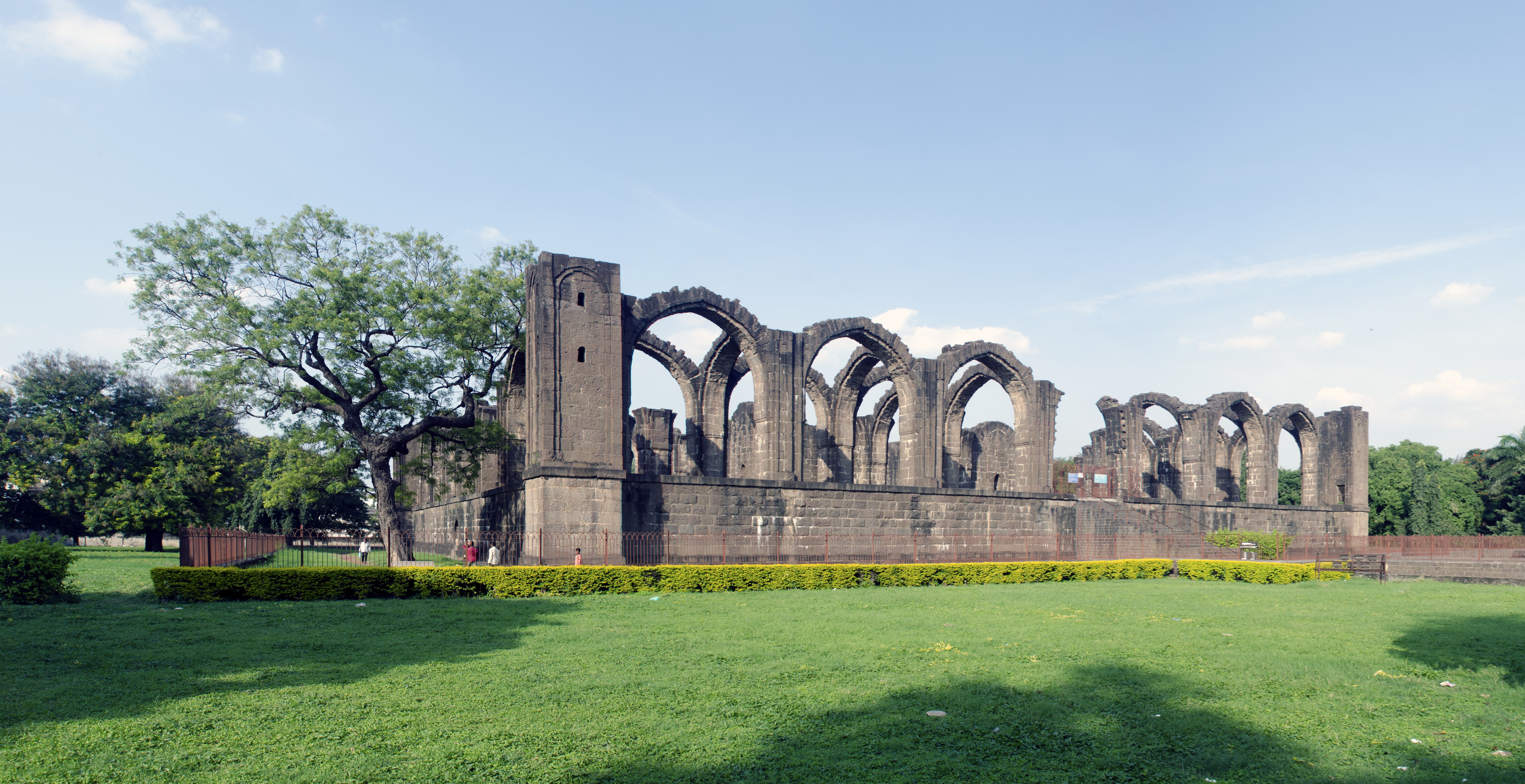
Bara Kaman

Bara Kaman is the unfinished mausoleum of Ali Adil Shah II in Bijapur, Karnataka in India.

Ali Adil Shah of the Adil Shahi dynasty wanted to build a mausoleum of unmatched architectural quality. It was planned that twelve arches would be placed vertically as well as horizontally surrounding the tomb of Ali Adil Shah. However, for unknown reasons the work on the structure was left incomplete: only two arches were raised vertically. Rumour has it that the construction of the mausoleum was stopped because once completed its shadow would touch the Gol Gombaz. Nowadays the remains of the twelve horizontally placed arches can still be seen.

The site is managed by the Archaeological Survey of India.

The Bara Kaman was built in 1672AD, by Ali Adil Shah II, and was supposed to be the burial mausoleum for the king and his wives. Bara Kaman has the tombs of Ali Adil Shah II, his wife Chand Bibi, his mistresses and his daughters.

The architect of Bara Kaman was Malik Sandal, an Abyssinian eunuch who rose up the military ranks and became a prominent figure in Ibrahim Adil Shah's court. The structure has raised walls in concentric arches. After the arches were erected, the inner arches were toppled, leaving only the outermost arch. No cement was used, instead iron rings were used to hold the stones together.
