= List of people from Bijapur, Karnataka =

The following people were born or based their life in the Indian city of Bijapur, Karnataka.

- Bhāskara II
- Basava – philosopher and a social reformer (Born in Ingaleshwar)
- Ranna (ರನ್ನ) – one of the earliest poets of Kannada language
- Satyanatha Tirtha – 17th-century Hindu philosopher and saint and 20th peetadhipathi of Uttaradi Math of Dvaita Vedanta
- Basappa Danappa Jatti
- Aravind Malagatti
- S. R. Kanthi
- M. B. Patil – minister for Water Resources, Government of Karnataka
- Amirbai Karnataki
- Aluru Venkata Rao
- M. M. Kalburgi
- Sunil Kumar Desai – filmmaker of the Kannada film industry
- Rajeshwari Gayakwad – cricketer
- Jyoti Gogte
