= List of films shot in Bijapur =

Bijapur city is the district headquarters, and is well known for its historical monuments of architectural importance built during the rule of the Adil Shahi dynasty. Bijapur is rich in historical attractions, mainly related to Islamic architecture, especially those of the Bijapur Fort. Many films have been shot in Bijapur.

== List of films shot in Bijapur ==
- Phalithamsha (Kannada Film)
- Number 1 (Kannada Film)
- Adhdhoori (Kannada Film)
- Alemari (Kannada Film)
- Bheema Theeradalli (Kannada Film)
- Govindaya Namaha (Kannada Film)
- Himapatha (Kannada Film)
- Janoo (Kannada Film)
- Veera Parampare (Kannada Film)
- sharan's "guru shishyaru" (2022)

(ಗುರು ಶಿಷ್ಯರು)

- "Chowka" (ಚೌಕ) (2017) kannada movie
- "shiva (ಶಿವ) (2012) kannada movie
- " Udala (ಉಡಾಳ್) (2026) kannada movie
