= Hardev Singh Coonar =

Indian dental surgeon (1933–2019)

- Born: Chakrata, India
- Died: Solan, India
- Education: Ripudamn College Nabha, affiliated to Panjab University; Government Dental College, Amritsar
- Occupation: Dental surgeon
- Known for: Oral implantology
- Medical career
- Institutions: Eastman Dental Hospital; Hammersmith Hospital; Charing Cross Hospital; Queen Victoria Hospital; Postgraduate Medical Institute, Chandigarh

Hardev Singh Coonar (9 December 1933 – 6 May 2019) was a dental surgeon active in the United Kingdom and India who was a specialist in oral implantology after being trained at the Branemark Clinic in Gothenburg, Sweden.

He co-founded a charitable dental and pain clinic in Hansali, Punjab, India, supported by both the Rotary International and local Gurudwara.

== Early life and education ==
Hardev Singh Coonar was born on 9 December 1933 at Chakrata, to Dr Major Shamsher Singh and Sardarni Partap Kaur. He was the younger brother of Pritam Singh, Sukhdev Singh and sister Pritam Kaur. His family background was one of military and farming.

Circumstances during the Second World War meant that Coonar changed schools several times. In 1949, he matriculated from Victoria Dalip High School, Solan, now in Himachal Pradesh. Subsequently, he attended Government Ripudaman College Nabha, affiliated to Panjab University. In 1952, he gained his FSc, a pre-medical examination which allowed him to apply to a dental or medical school. His education was supported by his elder brother Pritam Singh. Many years later, following Pritam Singh's death, Coonar stated "though my elder brother, he has been my father for 79 years."

== Early career ==
In 1952, Coonar gained admission to the Government Dental College in Amritsar and received his dental degree from Punjab in 1956, taking second place in the final exams. Sarla, his wife-to-be, came first. His early dental training was six months at the Dental Hospital, Amritsar, as a house surgeon, followed by three months as a senior house officer, which he completed in February 1957. Immediately thereafter, he was appointed assistant professor at the Dental Wing of Madras Medical College, where he remained until July 1958.

Before serving in the Short Service Commission in the Indian Army Dental Corps from 1959 to 1962, during which time he was awarded a gold medal for best cadet, he took the first part of the Fellowship in Dental Surgery in Colombo, in 1959. In April 1962, he began a postgraduate course at the Eastman Dental Hospital, which he completed in December of that year, and gained the final Fellowship in Dental Surgery by 1963.

== Later career ==
In 1963, he was appointed as senior lecturer at the Postgraduate Institute of Medical Education and Research in Chandigarh, where he was commissioned to establish a dental department. He later became assistant professor and then the first head of that department, where he remained until 1974. During that time, he took further training in Europe, including a postgraduate Fellowship in Oral Surgery in Aarhus, Denmark, from February to August 1967, and passing the General Dental Council's Statutory Exam in 1967, allowing him to practise in the United Kingdom. The following year, he began work in general practice in the NHS, where he continued until 1973, following which he took up posts in oral surgery at Guy's Hospital from 1974 to 1977. In the same year, he passed the Canadian National Dental Board examinations. In January 1979, he was appointed a senior residency in oral surgery at the Massachusetts General Hospital, Boston, where he remained for six months.

During his time in the UK, he took locum posts as a senior registrar at Queen Victoria Hospital, East Grinstead, Sussex in 1979, and the Eastman Dental Hospital in 1977 and again later in 1982. In that year, he was appointed consultant oral surgeon at the Eastman, where he remained as honorary senior lecturer until 1999, when he retired. His other posts included consultant at the Hammersmith Hospital (1982–1999) and between 1996 and 1999 at Charing Cross Hospital.

In 1984, he attended a basic diploma in implantology at the Branemark Clinic in Gothenburg, Sweden, followed by an advanced diploma two years later. Subsequently, and whist still practising in hospital as a general dental surgeon, he taught oral implantology to postgraduate MSc students in at the Eastman from 1985 to 1999.

== Retirement ==
In 1999, following retirement, he became locum consultant at the Royal Free Hospital until 2001, when he was visiting professor to Chandigarh's Postgraduate Medical Institute. Between March 2007 and February 2010, he was an Associate Clinical Teacher at the Institute of Clinical Education of Warwick Medical School.

== Charity work ==
In the 1950s, through combined efforts of Coonar, his father and brother Pritam, a National High school was opened at Balahri Kalan.

He co-founded a charitable dental and pain clinic in Hansali, Punjab, India, supported by both Rotary International and the local Gurudwara.

== Personal and family ==
Coonar married Sarla Sachdeva on 6 December 1964. They had met during the first class of the Amritsar Dental College, when they were both in their teens. She became a dental surgeon and they had two children, a son who became a cardiothoracic surgeon and a daughter who took over Sarla's practice as an orthodontist. Sarla died on 28 June 2018.

== Death and legacy ==
Coonar died on 6 May 2019, whilst visiting Solan, a town in Himachal Pradesh, India.

His name appears on the Royal Society of Medicine's wall of honour.

== Selected publications ==
- "Retromolar abscess due to foreign body", Journal All India Dental Association, Vol. 38, Issue 18 (January 1966)
- "The hollow obturator for treatment of maxillary defects", Dental Practitioner (Bristol), Vol. 20, November 1969, pp. 92–4.
- "Hodgkin’s disease presenting intra-orally", British Journal of Oral Surgery, Vol. 16, 1978–1979, pp. 64–69.
- "Primary intraosseous carcinoma of maxilla", British Dental Journal, Vol. 147, 1979, p. 47.
