= Shinal =

- Village
- Country: India
- State: Karnataka
- District: Belgaum
- Talukas: Athani

Languages
  - Spoken: Kannada, Marathi and Hindi
- Time zone: UTC+5:30 (IST)
- PIN: 591303

Shinal is a village in Belgaum district of Karnataka, India.

== Overview ==
Shinal is a small village and has population of approximately 2,000 (in the year 2011) and it comes under Athani Vidhan Sabha Kshetra. It is at border of Maharashtra and hence people can speak both Kannada and Marathi languages fluently. Basically all villagers are depended on agriculture and nowadays villagers are getting good education and have taken an engineering course, a teachers course and some of them are in Indian Army.

Two rivers are flow there, one is famous Krishna River and Agrani. Krishna river is 4 km away from the village but in the rainy season the backwater of Krishna River stays up to the village and it is a main water source for agriculture.

== Culture ==
Shinal has typical North Karnataka culture. Janapada (folk) songs and dances are found in the village. Most people are from the religions of Hindu Maratha and few Hindu kuruba

Mostly surnames such as Patil, Savant, Kavathekar, Chaugule, Durgi and Wagamore are found.

== Cuisine ==
In the village wheat and jowar rotis (unleavened bread made with millet) are popular.

The following are typical items in a vegetarian meal:

- Roti/Bhakri, Rice, Saaru, Happala and Kosambari
- Shenga/Ellu – Dry chutney in powder form, sometimes called Hindi (chutney) (nothing to do with the Hindi language); kempu khaara - hot chutney paste made with red chillies, eaten as a condiment
- Bele palya – Cooked split or whole Bele, chana, moong with Greens such as Methi, and Spring onion
- Mosaru bajji or raitha – salad with Mosaru and Majjige, Benne or Tuppa.

== Geography and transportation ==
Shinal comes in the middle of four other villages – Athani taluka, Muragundi, Ainapur and Hulagabali. The village full of greenery. Bus transportation is used less and most of people are use carts.

== Employment ==
Main income of villagers is agriculture and hainugarike (milk production). In agriculture Shinal is known for growing sugar cane. And also in hainugarike, most of milk exports to all over Athani taluka as well as to Maharashtra as it is nearby.some villagers are working in Athani Sugars Ltd. The factory owner from shinal.
