= Mahishwadgi =

Mahishwadgi mahishawadagi
- Village
- Country: India
- State: Karnataka
- District: Belgaum

Languages
  - Official: Kannada
- Time zone: UTC+5:30 (IST)
- ISO 3166 code: IN-KA

Mahishwadgi is a village in Belgaum district of Karnataka, India. Mahishwadgi is situated on the banks of Krishna River, 25 km from Athani, Belgavi. 90% of the population follow Jainism.

In Mahishwadgi agriculture is the main occupation. About 95% of the total population is engaged in agriculture. The main crops are jawar, wheat, sunflower, toordal, and kushbi. The commercial crops are sugarcane. Few varieties of vegetables like tomatoes, brinjals, ladies fingers, green leaves and redchillies are also grown with the limited rainfall, diesel power pumpsets are in vogue for the available water supply. And the main commercial crop is sugarcane. Irrigation facilities of Hipparagi barrage of Upper Krishna Projectis. By this project canals were constructed.
