= Athani =

Athani may refer to:

== Greece ==
- Athani, Greece

== India ==
- Athani, Belgavi, a city in Karnataka
  - Athani Taluk, a taluk in Karnataka in Belgaum district
  - Athani Rural, a village in Karnataka
- Athani, Thrissur, a village in Kerala
- Athani, Ernakulam, a village in Kerala
- Athani, Erode, a village in Tamil Nadu
