= Teerth =

- Village
- Country: India
- State: Karnataka
- District: Belgaum
- Taluk: Athani

Languages
  - Official: Kannada
- Time zone: UTC+5:30 (IST)
- Postal code: 591304

Teerth is a village in the Belgaum district of Karnataka, India. It is situated next to the Krishna River in Athani taluk.
