= Mangasuli =

- Village
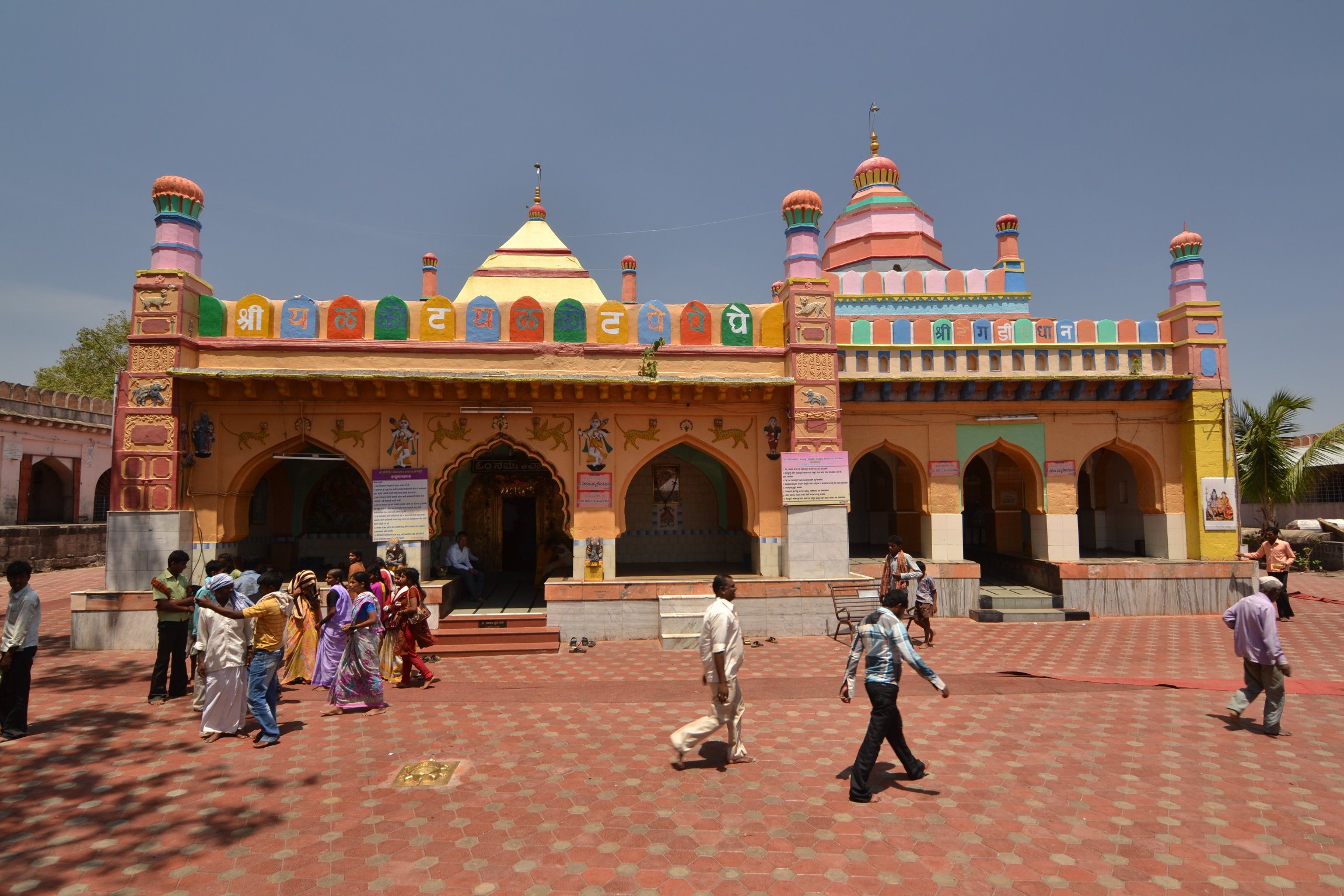
- Malhar temple in Mangasuli, Karnataka

- Location in Karnataka, India Mangasuli (India)
- Coordinates: 16.72°N 75.06°E
- Country: India
- State: Karnataka
- District: Belgaum
- Taluk: Athani, Belgaum

Population (2001)
  - Total: 10,152

Languages
  - Official: Kannada
- Time zone: UTC+5:30 (IST)
- Postal code: 591234

Mangasuli is a village located in Northern Karnataka, India. It is located in the Athani taluk of Belgaum district in Karnataka.

== Demographics ==
Census of Mangasuli
Year	# Population	# Males	# Females	Literacy %	Male Literacy %	Female Literacy %
2001	10152	5162	4990			
2011	12432	6371	6061	72	82	64

== Location and transportation ==
Mangasuli is a small town near the state border between Maharashtra and Karnataka. It is about 30 km from Miraj, 38 km from Sangli and 25 km from Athani. The nearest railway stations are Ugar, about 10 km away, and Shedbal about 11 km away.

== Business and economy ==
The main commercial crop in the area of Mangasuli is sugarcane. Many sugarcane factories are located nearby Mangasuli.

== See also ==
- Districts of Karnataka
