= Buralatti =

Village in Athani, Barnataka, India

- Village
- Interactive map of Buralatti
- Coordinates: 16°43′10.13″N 75°10′18.99″E
- Country: India
- State: Karnataka
- District: Belgaum district
- Tehsil: Athani

Population
  - Total: 4,000

Buralatti is a village in the Athani tehsil of the Belgaum district in Karnataka, India with a population of about 4,000. The village's ruling assembly is located in Katageri.

The village's industry is mainly agricultural, particularly farming and processing sugar. Most of younger generations are serving in the Indian army.

There are about 275 houses in Buralatti. Athani is the nearest town, approximately 13 km away.

The village has one public school providing up to the 8th standard level in the Indian education system. There are many self-help social societies in the village for women.

The patron Hindu goddess of the village is Shree Chandravvatai; her temple is situated near the village, and an annual festival is held in celebration of the goddess every November. Another Goddess temple is Shree Durgadevi situated in Village
