= Rajolibanda Diversion Scheme =

"Rajaolibanda Diversion Scheme" or "RDS" is an irrigation project located across River Tungabhadra in Jogulamba Gadwal district of Telangana, Kurnool district of Andhra Pradesh and Raichur district of Karnataka. It is an inter-state barrage on the Tungabhadra river to supply water to Karnataka, Telangana and Andhra Pradesh states. The full reservoir level of this project is 332.32 m MSL.

== History ==
RDS was taken up on river Tungabhadra as well as the headworks and the left bank canal, which was mostly completed by 1956. In 2013, Krishna Water Disputes Tribunal-2 allocated four (4) tmcft water for construction of RDS right bank canal in Kurnool district.

== Project ==
RDS left canal provides irrigation water in Raichur district and Mahbubnagar district of Telangana. The Bachawat Tribunal had allocated 17.1 tmcft to its left canal of which 15.9 tm cft was exclusively meant for Mahabubnagar district. The RDS left canal has been a source of sorrow to the Mahabubnagar farmers because it is hardly giving them 8 to 10 tmcft against their entitlement of 15.9 tmcft.

The Rajolibanda project is not receiving adequate continuous flows due to excessive water utilization in its catchment area in Karnataka. It would be a permanent solution to connect the upstream catchment area (near 16°01′00″N 76°32′00″E at 475 m MSL) via 20 km long tunnel with the Narayanpur reservoir which is located across the adjacent Krishna River. It would also provide additional water to bring more area under irrigation in uplands of Raichur & Mahboobnagar districts and low lands of Kurnool district. Reliable Krishna river water can be supplied instead of unreliable Tungabhadra river water to the existing Tungabhadra Left bank canal in Raichur district, the existing Rajolibanda left bank canal, and the existing 150 years old K. C. Canal. In addition to taking up Rajolibanda right bank canal construction, a new canal /weir ( 15°51′27″N 77°01′59″E ) would be constructed across the Tungabhadra river located upstream of Rajolibanda Project to divert the augmented Krishna river water for the additional irrigation in Kurnool district. Thus substantial Tungabhadra reservoir water would be saved for utilization in upstream new projects and reliable water supply is ensured to existing projects.

== See also ==
- Almatti Dam
- Tummilla Lift Irrigation Project
- Upper Krishna Project
