= Ghatanatti =

- Village
- Interactive map of Ghatanatti
- Coordinates: 16.6639°N 75.1023°E
- Country: India
- State: Karnataka
- District: Belagavi
- Talukas: Athani

Government
  - Type: Panchayat raj
  - Body: Gram panchayat

Population (2011)
  - Total: 1,968

Languages
  - Official: Kannada
- Time zone: UTC+5:30 (IST)
- Postal code: 591304
- ISO 3166 code: IN-KA
- Vehicle registration: KA
- Website: karnataka.gov.in

Ghatanatti is a village in Athani Taluq and Belagavi district in the southern state of Karnataka, India.
