= S. G. Balekundri =

Indian engineer and irrigation expert

Shivappa Gurubasappa Balekundri (Kannada:ಶಿವಪ್ಪ ಗುರುಬಸಪ್ಪ ಬಾಳೇಕುಂದ್ರಿ, 5 May 1922, date of death unknown), often referred to as S. G. Balekundri, was an Indian Engineer irrigation expert from Karnataka.

== Early life ==
S.G. Balekundri was born on May 5, 1922, in Belgaum. Mother Lakshmidevi; Father Gurusiddappa. After completing his primary education in Hubli, Balekundri completed his high school and post-graduate education in Belgaum. Later he got admission to Government COEP, Pune, and graduated in 1944 with first rank.

== Career ==
In 1945, he started his career as an Assistant Engineer in the Public Works Department of the then Mumbai State. The Mumbai government sent him to the University of Edinburgh for further studies in irrigation. Later he was in charge of the irrigation canals of the Pune division. Later he was in charge of the Ganga Dam, constructed near Nasik, then Dhulia Dam, and so on.

After that, when he was working in the planning commission of the central government, Balekundri noticed the injustice being done to Karnataka in the distribution of river water and warned the leaders of Karnataka. Impressed by this, the then Chief Minister of Karnataka, B. D. Jatti invited Balekundri to the state.

After returning to the state in 1959, Balekundri took charge of the inter-state river dispute issue and fought ably for Karnataka's legitimate rights, playing an essential role in the Ghataprabha, Malaprabha, and Krishna irrigation projects and constructions.

== After Retirement ==
After retirement, he served Karnataka in various capacities as Chairman of the Tungabhadra Project Modification Expert Advisory Committee, Bagalkot Reconstruction and Rehabilitation Review Committee, and Control of the Board for Major Irrigation Projects and Chairman of the Member Committee appointed to start a Technical University in Karnataka.

== Legacy ==
He is best remembered today as Second Visveswarayya. The Karnataka government has honored him by instituting an award for engineering excellence in his name. A statue was also erected in 2006 at Alamatti in Balekundri's honor, and a road has been named after him in the state capital Bengaluru.

S.G. Balekundri Institute of Technology, Belgaum, an Engineering college affiliated to Visvesvaraya Technological University, Belagavi has been named in his honor. In Malaprabha dam I.e. Naveelutheerta garden the bust of Mr. Balrkundri is located to honour his work.

== See also ==
- Upper Krishna Project

About Sri S.G. Balekundri in Kannada
