= Malabad =

Coordinates: 17°14′N 76°26′E

Mallabad Mallabad
- Village
- Interactive map of Mallabad
- Country: India
- State: Karnataka
- District: Belgaum
- Talukas: Athni

Languages
  - Official: Kannada
- Time zone: UTC+5:30 (IST)

Mallabad is a village in Belgaum district of Karnataka, India.
