= Gundewadi =

- Village
- Location in Karnataka, India Gundewadi (India)
- Coordinates: 16°49′N 75°06′E
- Country: India
- State: Karnataka
- District: Belgaum
- Talukas: Athani

Languages
  - Official: Kannada
- Time zone: UTC+5:30 (IST)

Gundewadi is a village in Belgaum district in the southern state of Karnataka, India.
