= Badachi =

- Village
- Country: India
- State: Karnataka
- District: Belgaum
- Talukas: Athani

Languages
  - Official: Kannada
- Time zone: UTC+5:30 (IST)
- ISO 3166 code: IN-KA

Maashahibi Darga

Badachi is a village in Belgaum district in the southern state of Karnataka, India. It is located in Athani Taluka of Belgaum District, near Bijapur -Athani Highway.

Badachi is a small Village/hamlet in Athani Taluk in Belgaum District of Karnataka, India. It comes under Badachi Panchayath. It belongs to Belgaum Division . It is located 139 km towards North from District headquarters Belgaum. 12 km from Athni. 578 km from State capital Bangalore Badachi Pin code is 591230 and postal head office is Kokatnur .

Parthanahalli ( 10 km ), Athni ( 11 km ), Gundewadi ( 12 km ), Naganur P K ( 12 km ), Kohalli ( 13 km ) are the nearby Villages to Badachi. Badachi is surrounded by Jamkhandi Taluk towards South, Jath Taluk towards North, Kavathemahankal Taluk towards North, Raybag Taluk towards west .

Terdal, Rabkavi Banhatti, Mahalingpur, Mudhol are the nearby Cities to Badachi.

== Badachi 2011 Census Details ==
Badachi Local Language is Kannada. Badachi Village Total population is 3985 and number of houses are 774. Female Population is 48.7%. Village literacy rate is 49.7% and the Female Literacy rate is 21.3%. Badachi Census More Details.

== Population ==
Census Parameter	Census Data
Total Population	3985
Total No of Houses	774
Female Population %	48.7 % ( 1941)
Total Literacy rate %	49.7 % ( 1982)
Female Literacy rate	21.3 % ( 850)
Scheduled Tribes Population %	15.0 % ( 597)
Scheduled Caste Population %	14.3 % ( 570)
Working Population %	53.2 %
Child(0 -6) Population by 2011	650
Girl Child(0 -6) Population % by 2011	46.8 % ( 304)

== Politics in Badachi ==
JD(U), BJP, INC are the major political parties in this area.

=== Polling Stations /Booths near Badachi ===
1)Govt. Kannada Higher Primary School New Building North Room No.2 Zhunjarwad

2)Govt. Kannada Higher Primary School New Building Room No.2 Badachi

3)Govt. Kannada Higher Primary School Old Building Room No.1 Ramavadi (hulagabali)

4)Nammura Govt. Higher Primary School Eastern From North Room No.2 Motagi Tota Athani Rural

5)Nammura Govt. Higher Primary School Western Room Aigali Tota Athani Rural

== HOW TO REACH Badachi ==
=== By Road ===
Athni is the Nearest Town to Badachi. Athni is 8 km from Badachi. Road connectivity is there from Athni to Badachi.

=== By Rail ===
There is no railway station near to Badachi in less than 10 km.
