= Darur =

- Village
- Nickname: Darr
- Location in Karnataka, India Darur (India)
- Coordinates: 16.72°N 75.06°E
- Country: India
- State: Karnataka
- District: Belgaum
- Founder: Durga Munil
- Talukas: Athani

Government
  - Type: Decentralised
  - Body: Grama Panchayat

Area
  - Total: 04 km^{2} (1.5 sq mi)

Population (2001)
  - Total: 5,244
  - Density: 1,300/km^{2} (3,400/sq mi)

Languages
  - Official: Kannada
- Time zone: UTC+5:30 (IST)

Darur is a village in the southern state of Karnataka, India. It is located in the Athani Taluk of Belagavi district in Karnataka.

== Demographics ==
As of 2001 India census, Darur had a population of 5,244 with 2,669 males and 2,575 females. The village is well known by Krishna River and its flood prone area, historically this is famous for agriculture and animal husbandry.

== Agriculture ==
Agriculture is the main source of economy. Now the village is known for commercial crops such as, sugar cane, cotton, sunflower, and traditional crops like maize, soybean, rice, and wheat.

== See also ==
- Belgaum
- Districts of Karnataka
