= Siddhewadi =

Village in Maharashtra

- Interactive map of Siddhewadi
- Coordinates: 17°8′46″N 74°46′33″E
- Country: India
- State: Maharashtra
- District: Solapur

Area
  - Total: 2,181 ha (5,390 acres)

Siddhewadi is a village in Pandharpur tehsil, Maharashtra, India. It is situated 15 km (9.3 mi) from the sub-district headquarters at Pandharpur and 59 km (37 mi) from the district headquarters at Solapur.

It covers an area of 2,181 ha (5,390 acres) (gram panchayat).

== Demographics ==
The population is over 5,000. Siddhewadi has a lower literacy rate than Maharashtra. In 2011, the literacy rate was 77.78% compared to 82.34% in Maharashtra. The literacy rate among men is 87.12% and 68.45% among women.

== Governance ==
As per the constitution of India and Panchyati Raaj Act, Siddhewadi is administered by Sarpanch, the Head of Village, who was elected the representative of the village.

== Education ==
- Jawaharlal Nehru Highschool
- Zilla Parishad School up to 4 Standard

== Economics and infrastructure ==
The main water source is Manganga river and left uni canol. The main crops are sugarcane, grape and pomegranate. Other crops include Jawar, maize, Bajri, Tur, peanut and wheat.
