= Avarkhod =

- Village
- Location in Karnataka, India Avarkhod (India)
- Coordinates: 16°37′N 75°02′E
- Country: India
- State: Karnataka
- District: Belgaum
- Talukas: Athani

Languages
  - Official: Kannada
- Time zone: UTC+5:30 (IST)

Avarkhod is a village in Belgaum district in the southern state of Karnataka, India. famous for hanuman temple and grape is a backbone of avarkhod

Hanuman temple avarkhod

== Demographics ==
Covering 1,153 hectares (2,850 acres) and comprising 660 households at the time of the 2011 census of India, Avarkhod had a population of 3437. There were 1782 males and 1655 females, with 527 people being aged six or younger.
