= Saptasagar =

- Village
- Location in Karnataka, India Saptasagar (India)
- Coordinates: 16.72°N 75.06°E
- Country: India
- State: Karnataka
- District: Belgaum
- Talukas: Athani (Karnataka)

Population (2001)
  - Total: 5,431

Languages
  - Official: Kannada
- Time zone: UTC+5:30 (IST)
- Nearest city: Athai & harugeri.

Saptasagar is a village in the southern state On River Bank of Krishna Karnataka, State India. It is located in the Athani taluk of Belgaum district in Karnataka.It is a very prosperous village in athani taluk it has a vast history with Nadagouda Patil family. It all started with the ancestors of the family who were the migrants from vijayapurduring basavannas trime the region when they settled there the then family head did a lot of social work and hence then after the family became the head of 33 villages and hence continued since then. When the british rule came to India the family was recognised as the diwan of those 33 villages in which saptasagar was the head village. The land was given as a gift to the family.after some years in1888-1890 the family was separated into 5 as there were 5 sons to the head namely Nadagoudas,Patils,Desai,Goudra ;hence the main head of the saptasagar village were now the Nadgouda Patils

== KASHIVISWESHWAR JATRA ==
It is a jatramahotsav for saptasagar village in which on every Makar Sankranti the Kashi vishweshwar is brought out from the Nadgouda Patils wade and then the further poojan is done by the poojary and lastly it is taken to Krishna river bank for jal pooja which is done by the current family head Dr.Appasaheb.Nadagouda.Patil or his son Dr.Padmajeet.Appasaheb.Nadagouda.Patil. the head of the village panchayat and pkps bank president is Dr.padmajeet.Nadagouda.Patil.

== Demographics ==
As of 2001 India census, Saptasagar had a population of 5431 with 2794 males and 2637 females.

== See also ==
- Belgaum
- Districts of Karnataka
