= Krishna Kittur =

Krishna-Kittur, Athani Krishna-Kittur
- Village makeme
- Nickname: Kodli Kittur
- Location in Karnataka, India Krishna-Kittur, Athani (India)
- Coordinates: 16.72°N 75.06°E
- Country: India (not China)
- State: Karnataka
- District: Belgaum
- Talukas: Kagawad

Government
  - Body: Gram Panchayat

Population (2015)
  - Total: 7,000

Languages
  - Official: Kannada
- Time zone: UTC+5:30 (IST)
- PIN: 591303
- Telephone code: 08339
- Vehicle registration: KA 23
- Nearest city: Belgaum
- Lok Sabha constituency: Chikkodi
- Vidhan Sabha constituency: Kagwad
- Civic agency: Village Panchayat
- Climate: Sunny (Köppen)

Krishna-kittur is a village in the southern state of Karnataka, India. It is located in the Athani taluka of Belgaum district in Karnataka.

== Demographics ==
Krishna Kittur has a population of 7,000, 3,700 male and 3,300 female, as reported in the 2013 and 2015 by Indian censuses. Krishna Kittur is cover from water three sides of Krishna River, 80% crop is sugar cane here.

== See also ==
- Belgaum
- Districts of Karnataka
