= Khavatkoppa =

- Village
- Country: India
- State: Karnataka
- District: Belagavi
- Talukas: Athani

Languages
  - Official: Kannada
- Time zone: UTC+5:30 (IST)

Khavatkoppa is a village in Belagavi district in Karnataka, India.

It is located on the Krishna river bank. There are three main Temples one is the old Hanuman temple Dr b r ambedkar bavan Renukadevi Temple the Kalmeshwar temple and Venkateshwar temple, which was started by priest Shrinivas acharya Nadpurohit and Kulkarni family.
