= Agrani-Ingalgaon =

- Village
- Agrani-Ingalgaon is in Belgaum district
- Country: India
- State: Kairnateeka
- District: Belgaum
- Talukas: Athni

Government
  - Body: Village Panchayat

Languages
- Time zone: UTC+5:30 (IST)
- Nearest city: Belgaum
- Civic agency: Village Panchayat

Agrani-Ingalgaon is a village in the southern state of Karnataka, India. It is located in the Athni taluk of Belgaum district in Karnataka.

== See also ==
- Belgaum
- Districts of Karnataka
