= V. R. Kokatnur =

American chemist of Indian origin

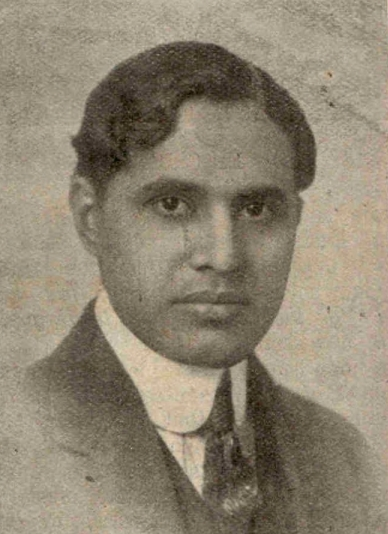

Vaman Ramachandra Kokatnur (December 16, 1886 – April 14, 1950) was an American chemist of Indian origin. He was an industrial chemist and patented several chemical processes in the USA, Germany, England, France, and Canada, particularly the use of catalysts in organic synthesis. Like many Indian immigrants into the US in the period he supported Indian Independence, while considering caste and class hierarchies as necessities in society.

== Early life and education ==
Kokatnur was born in Kokatnur village in Athani, Bombay Presidency on December 16, 1886, to Ramchandra A. and Krishnabai (Tagare) Kokatnur. He was educated in the Vernacular School, New English School and Fergusson College at Poona, and at Bombay University, from which he was graduated in 1911 with BSc in chemistry and geology.

He moved to the US in August 1912, receiving an MS degree in chemistry and geology from the University of Minnesota in 1914. He was elected to the Sigma Psi, an honorary scientific society; and also became the first foreigner to be awarded with the Shevlin fellowship. He received his PhD in chemistry in 1916.

In 1921, he became a naturalized American citizen.

== Career ==
In 1928, he was sent to Russia as a consultant for the production of chlorine and caustic soda. During World War II he was drafted into the Navy as a special consultant with the rank of captain.

== History research ==
In 1948, he examined chemistry in ancient Indian literature and claimed that the ancients must have had considerable knowledge based on his interpretation of various arms mentioned in translations of the Ramayana that he examined. He was noted as being interested in the hieroglyphics which he believed was related to Sanskrit. At a meeting of the American Chemical Society he claimed that Indians had discovered hydrogen and oxygen and that chemistry was of "Aryan origin". He said he had identified this from a four-page manuscript supposedly dating to 1550 and claimed to be the Agastya Samhita or writings of the sage Agastya who supposedly lived in 2000 BC. According to Kokatnur, the work actually described electrolysis and that the gods Mitra and Varuna mentioned were to be interpreted as Mitra meaning friend, and therefore as the cathode, and Varuna meaning liquid or enemy of zinc and therefore referring to the anode. He claimed that the term "prana" meant vital to life and therefore indicated oxygen while "udana" meant facing upward and therefore identified it as being hydrogen. About the source and its provenance he claimed that it could not have been a fake because the paper appeared to be older than 50 years and that the discoveries to prevent polarization had only just been made. His work was supposedly to be published in the science history journal Isis but possibly due to the doubtful provenance of sources and the rather vague interpretations, was never published.

== Personal life ==
He married Helen Rose Graber, an alumna of University of Minnesota, in February 1921. He attended the University Unitarian Church philosophical society, while his wife was a member of the Methodist Church. They had two children, Urmila Vaman Kokatnur and Arvind Vaman Kokatnur.
