= Bevanoor =

Bevanoor Bevanoor
- Village
- Country: India
- State: Karnataka
- District: Belgaum
- Talukas: Athani

Government
  - Type: Govt of Karnataka
  - Body: pachayati
  - Rank: 1

Languages
  - Official: Kannada
- Time zone: UTC+5:30 (IST)
- Postal code: 591212
- ISO 3166 code: IN-KA
- Vehicle registration: KA-71

Bevanoor is a village in Belgaum district in the southern state of Karnataka, India. It is known for sugarcane, turmeric, wheat and maize agriculture.
