= Balawad =

- Village
- Country: India
- State: Karnataka
- District: Belgaum
- Talukas: Athani

Languages
  - Official: Kannada
- Time zone: UTC+5:30 (IST)

Balawad is a village in Belgaum district in the southern state of Karnataka, India.
