= Kohalli =

Village in Karnataka, India

- village
- Location in Karnataka, India Kohalli (India)
- Coordinates: 16.72°N 75.06°E
- Country: India
- State: Karnataka
- District: Belgaum
- Talukas: Athni

Population (2001)
  - Total: 5,948

Languages
  - Official: Kannada
- Time zone: UTC+5:30 (IST)

Kohalli is a village in the southern state of Karnataka, India. It is located in the Athni taluk of Belgaum district in Karnataka.

== Demographics ==
As of 2001 India census, Kohalli had a population of 5948 with 3053 males and 2895 females.

== See also ==
- Belgaum
- Districts of Karnataka
