= Vishnuvadi =

Vishnuvadi, Vishnuwadi
- Village
- Country: India
- State: Karnataka
- District: Belgaum
- Talukas: Athani

Area
  - Total: 5 km^{2} (1.9 sq mi)

Population (2001)
  - Total: 2,000
  - Density: 400/km^{2} (1,000/sq mi)

Languages
  - Official: Marathi
- Time zone: UTC+5:30 (IST)

Vishnuvadi is a village in Belgaum district in the southern state of Karnataka, India.
