= Shivanoor =

- Village
- Country: India
- State: Karnataka
- District: Belgaum
- Talukas: Athani

Government
  - Type: Panchayat raj

Languages
  - Official: Kannada
- Time zone: UTC+5:30 (IST)

Shivanoor is a village in Belgaum district of Karnataka, India. According to Census 2011 information the location code or village code of Shivanoor village is 597265. Shivanoor village is located in Athni Tehsil of Belgaum district in Karnataka, India. It is situated 13km away from sub-district headquarter Athani and 167km away from district headquarter Belgaum. As per 2009 stats, Jambagi is the gram panchayat of Shivanoor village.

The total geographical area of village is 1238.17 hectares. Shivanoor has a total population of 2,650 peoples. There are about 505 houses in Shivanoor village. Athani is nearest town to Shivanoor which is approximately 13km away.
