= Kottalgi =

Village in Karnataka, India

Kottalagi
- Village
- Location in Karnataka, India Kottalagi (India)
- Coordinates: 16.72°N 75.06°E
- Country: India
- State: Karnataka
- District: Belagavi
- Taluk: Athani

Population (2001)
  - Total: 5,737

Languages
  - Official: Kannada
- Time zone: UTC+5:30 (IST)

Kottalagi is a village in the southern state of Karnataka, India. It is located in the Athani taluk of Belagavi district in Karnataka.

== Demographics ==
At the 2001 India census, Kottalgi had a population of 5737 with 2946 males and 2791 females.

== See also ==
- Belgaum
- Districts of Karnataka
