= Adahalli =

Coordinates: 12°05′N 76°26′E

- Village
- Adahalli is in Belgaum district
- Interactive map of Adahalli
- Country: India
- State: Karnataka
- District: Belgaum
- Talukas: Athni

Government
  - Body: Village Panchayat

Languages
  - Official: Kannada
- Time zone: UTC+5:30 (IST)
- Nearest city: Belgaum
- Civic agency: Village Panchayat

Adahalli is a village in the southern state of Karnataka, India. It is located in the Athni taluk of Belagavi district (formerly known as Belgaum district) in Karnataka.

== See also ==
- Belgaum
- Districts of Karnataka
