= Ugar Khurd =

Ugar Khurd Ugar Khurd
- Town
- Nickname: Sanna (Small) Ugar [ಸಣ್ಣ ಉಗಾರ]
- Location in Karnataka, India Ugar Khurd (India)
- Coordinates: 16.6582°N 74.8215°E
- Country: India
- State: Karnataka

Government
  - MLA (Member of Legislative Assembly): Bharamgouda Alagouda Kage

Population (2011)
  - Total: 23,762
- Time zone: UTC+5:30 (IST)
- Zip Code: 591316
- Telephone code: 08339
- Vehicle registration: KA-71
- Civic agency: Town municipal council
- Website: www.ugar-khurdtown.mrc.gov.in

Ugar Khurd is a town and municipal council in the district of Belagavi, in the state of Karnataka, India, on the banks of the Krishna River. According to the 2011 census, the population of the town is about 23,762, of whom almost 2,000 work in the Ugar Sugar Works.

"Khurd" is a Persian word meaning 'small' (see Khurd and Kalan).

The area surrounding Ugar has a black volcanic soil suited for sugar cane, cotton, sunflowers and soya beans and is irrigated by the Krishna river.

There are several houses of worship including Hindu temples, a Jain Mandir, and several mosques.

== Education ==
Ugar Sugar Works started production in the early 1940s, and it started a school for the families of workers, called Shri Hari Vidyalaya. The city has grown since, as has the school, which has steadily expanded its original reach of Marathi only mode of instruction to include both Kannada and English media. The school now also includes bachelor's degrees in Arts Commerce and science so the students will not have to move to nearby larger cities for their further education. It also offers a series of vocational courses including computer sciences.

There is a newly emerged school named Shri Guru Vidya English Medium School situated near railway station WEBSITE-. The medium of instruction is English. The school, started in 2013 is emerging to be one of the prominent school in the town. Apart from academics, the students in school have scope to learn many extracurricular activities like Karate, dance and many more.

The town of Ugar, now has a government-run public school as well, Kannada Gandu Makkala Shale, which means 'Kannada Boys School'. However, the name is a misnomer as it is co-ed. This is for students in both Kannada and Marathi medium of instructions, but only from 1st grade to 7th, after which the students move on to Shri Hari Vidyalaya.

Ugar Sugar Works also operates a preschool for much younger children ranging from age 4 to 6. The preschool has many amenities for children including a see-saw, swing, and ample space to play.

Religions in Ugar
Religion	Percent
Hindus	79.6%
Muslims	18.2%
Jainism	2.1%
Others†	0.1%
Distribution of religions †Includes Sikhs (0.1%), Buddhists (<0.1%).

== Transportation ==
Ugar Khurd railway station is situated on the Pune–Miraj–Londa railway line operated by the South Western Railway zone. Belgaum, the district headquarters, about 100 km from Ugar, has the nearest airport.

== History, and the Ugar Sugar Works ==
The Ugar Sugar Works Ltd is the flagship organization of the Shirgaokar Group of Companies, and is by far the sole major employer. It employs approximately 6000 full-time employees, and many more seasonal employees. The annual revenues exceed INR 600 crores. The company has been involved in the manufacture of white crystal sugar for over 65 years. The group also has plants in Jewargi and Bagalkot. The total sugar crushing capacity is approximately 19,000 tcd a day.

USW is the main reason why the township of Ugar came into existence.

In the early 1940s, Ugar Khurd was a small hamlet in the erstwhile princely state of Sangli. However, it had a few distinct advantages: the perennial river Krishna, fertile black soil, and a railway station that could be used to transport goods. Then, the ruler of Sangli invited the late Dr.S.R.Shirgaokar, who had previous experience setting up a sugar factory at Kolhapur.

Soon after setting up a sugar plant, the company diversified its activities and started its own distillery in 1962–63. It added the liquor section in 1967–68. The company produces high quality premium brands like Old Castle Whisky, Gokak Falls Whisky, US Rum, Doctors Brandy, and Gagarin Vodka. The company's brands are well accepted by the market.

Thereafter, the company further diversified and set up a first-in-its-kind-in India Co-Generation Power Plant of 44 MW. This was based on the principle of bagasse based renewable sources of energy used as fuel. Out of this, 28 MW are being exported to the grid and the rest of the 16 MW are used for in-city consumption.

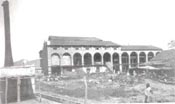
Ugar sugars industry in 1941

== Migration ==
Ugar is a far more progressive town than any other nearby villages. As a result, it has seen its own side of migration in the 1990s and 2000s. Increased awareness among nearby villages to provide a quality education to their children and to provide a progressive city life has caused a good deal of migration to Ugar. Many government and bank employees who work in nearby villages reside in Ugar. Ugar has become a commercial center for many villages like Kudchi, Ainapur, Mangasuli, Shedbal, Kusnal, Kagawad, Shirguppi, and Chinchali.
