= Maradi, Belgaum =

Maradi
- Village
- Location in Karnataka, India Maradi (India)
- Coordinates: 16.3907°N 74.7406°E
- Country: India
- State: Karnataka
- District: Belgaum
- Talukas: Athani

Languages
  - Official: Kannada
- Time zone: UTC+5:30 (IST)

Maradi is a village in Belgaum district of Karnataka, India.
