= Shivapur, Belgaum =

Shivapur
- Village
- Location in Karnataka, India Shivapur (India)
- Coordinates: 16.1841°N 74.7079°E
- Country: India
- State: Karnataka
- District: Belgaum
- Talukas: Athani

Languages
  - Official: Kannada
- Time zone: UTC+5:30 (IST)

Shivapur is a village in Belgaum district of Karnataka, India.
