= Junjarwad =

Junjarwad Zunjarwad
- Village
- Country: India
- State: Karnataka
- District: Belgaum
- Demonym: Kannadiga

Languages
  - Official: Kannada
- Time zone: UTC+5:30 (IST)
- Postal code: 591230
- ISO 3166 code: IN-KA

Junjarwad also written as Zunjarwad is a village in Belgaum district in the southern state of Karnataka, India. This is located at a distance of 33km from taluk headquarter Athani. Major occupation of the habitats is agriculture and village has around 3000 acres of agriculture land . Sugar cane is the primary crop. Majority of the villagers belongs to digambarJain religion .Other religions like lingayat, Islam and others are also practiced by villagers
