= Tevaratti =

- Village
- Country: India
- State: Karnataka
- District: Belgaum
- Talukas: Athani

Languages
  - Official: Kannada
- Time zone: UTC+5:30 (IST)

Tevaratti is a village in Belgaum district of Karnataka, India. The main occupation of the people is agriculture. Mostly rainfed area is there so main crops of this land are sorghum and sugarcane. Tevaratti is also known for its large number of government employees.
