= Chamakeri =

Chamakeri Chamakeri
- Village
- Nickname: Chamakeri
- Location in Karnataka, India Chamakeri (India)
- Coordinates: 16.78°N 75.08°E
- Country: India
- State: Karnataka
- District: Belgaum
- Established: 1859
- Named after: Village
- Talukas: Athani

Population (2011)
  - Total: 3,154
  - Density: 200/km^{2} (520/sq mi)

Languages
  - Official: Kannada
- Time zone: UTC+5:30 (IST)
- Nearest city: Athani
- Sex ratio: 1000:951 ♂/♀
- Literacy: 65%
- Lok Sabha constituency: chikkodi
- Vidhan Sabha constituency: Athani
- Website: www.chamakeri.in

Chamakeri is a village in the Belgaum district of Athani Taluk in the southern Indian state of Karnataka.

== Demographics ==
According to the 2011 Indian census, Chamakeri has a total population of 3,154: 1,647 males and 1,507 females. It is situated 15 km from sub-district headquarters Athani and 150 km away from district headquarters Belgaum. The total area of the village is 2419.89 hectares. Some 631 houses are in Chamakeri village. Athani, the nearest town to Chamakeri, is approximately 15 km away.

== Temples ==
Chamakeri is home to the Shree Sadashiva Mutt, Shree Hanuman and Shree Mahalaxshmi temples.

== Shri Sadashiva Mutt, Sukshetra Chamakeri ==
Shri Sadashiva Mutt, Sukshetra Chamakeri is one of the Hindu pilgrims in northern Karnataka. Shree Guru Chakravartin Sadashiv Murthy (Muthya) of Babaladi village in Bijapur district had a mutt in Chamakeri. It is one of the Babaladi mutts in Akshatadigi Amavasya that celebrates Yatra Mahotsava, which is celebrated for 5 days every year. A cattle fair is part of it.

== Agriculture ==
More than 80% of the land in the village can be used to grow crops. Farmers mainly grow sugar cane, grapes, maize and sorghum. Lemons, onions and turmeric are grown, but are less common. Irrigation is mainly based on water canals and wells.

== Transport ==
Chamakeri is connected to the Taluk headquarters Athani and Bijapur by Athani State Highway.

== Education ==
More than 500 students from 1st to 7th grade go to Government Higher Primary School (HPS, Chamakeri) in Chamakeri. The Government Marathi Higher Primary School is also. Privately funded primary and high school Shivayya Swamiji Primary and High School, Chamakeri is there.

The literacy rate is about 65%.
