= Kakamari =

Village in Karnataka, India

Kakamari is a village in Belgaum district in the southwestern state of Karnataka, India. It belongs to the Belgaum Division. It is located 164 km towards north from the district headquarters in Belgaum. 35 km from Athni. 583 km from the state capital, Bangalore.

Kakamari Pin code is 591265 and postal head office is Telsang.
Kohalli (11 km), Aigali (12 km), Adahalli (15 km) are the nearby Villages to Kakamari. Kakamari is surrounded by Athni Taluk towards west, Jamkhandi Taluk towards South, Bijapur Taluk towards East, Kavathemahankal Taluk towards west.
Bijapur, Sangole, Rabkavi Banhatti, Terdal are the nearby Cities to Kakamari.

== Kakamari 2011 Census Details ==
Kakamari Local Language is Kannada. Kakamari Village Total population is 5509 and number of houses are 1102. Female Population is 49.4%. Village literacy rate is 53.9% and the Female Literacy rate is 22.6%.

== Population ==
Census Parameter	Census Data
Total Population	5509
Total No of Houses	1102
Female Population %	49.4 % ( 2721)
Total Literacy rate %	53.9 % ( 2970)
Female Literacy rate	22.6 % ( 1246)
Scheduled Tribes Population %	0.0 % ( 0)
Scheduled Caste Population %	11.9 % ( 656)
Working Population %	51.7 %
Child(0 -6) Population by 2011	795
Girl Child(0 -6) Population % by 2011	50.1 % ( 398)

Kakamari Census More Details.
