= Aigali =

- Village
- Location in Karnataka, India Aigali (India)
- Coordinates: 16.72°N 75.06°E
- Country: India
- State: Karnataka
- District: Belgaum
- Talukas: Athani

Population (2011)
  - Total: 8,259

Languages
  - Official: Kannada
- Time zone: UTC+5:30 (IST)
- PIN: 591248

Aigali is a village in the Athani taluk of Belgaum district, at the southern state of Karnataka, India.

== Temples ==
- Appayya Swami Temple Aigali
- Manik Prabhu Temple
- Rudrapashupati Temple near masuti

Shree Basaveshwara Temple at the heart of the village. Gopuram for temple is built recently. Shree Virhala Mandira is renovated during 2018 situated near Grama Panchayati. A new Temple is built by life time savings of Shree Sharana Mallappa Narasappa Sindur on his own land For Shree Appayya Swamiji. A Committee is formed to look after and development of this temple.

== Demographics ==
As of 2001 India census, Aigali had a population of 7425 with 3807 males and 3618 females.

== See also ==
- Belgaum
- Districts of Karnataka
