= Skanda Purana =

Medieval-era Sanskrit text

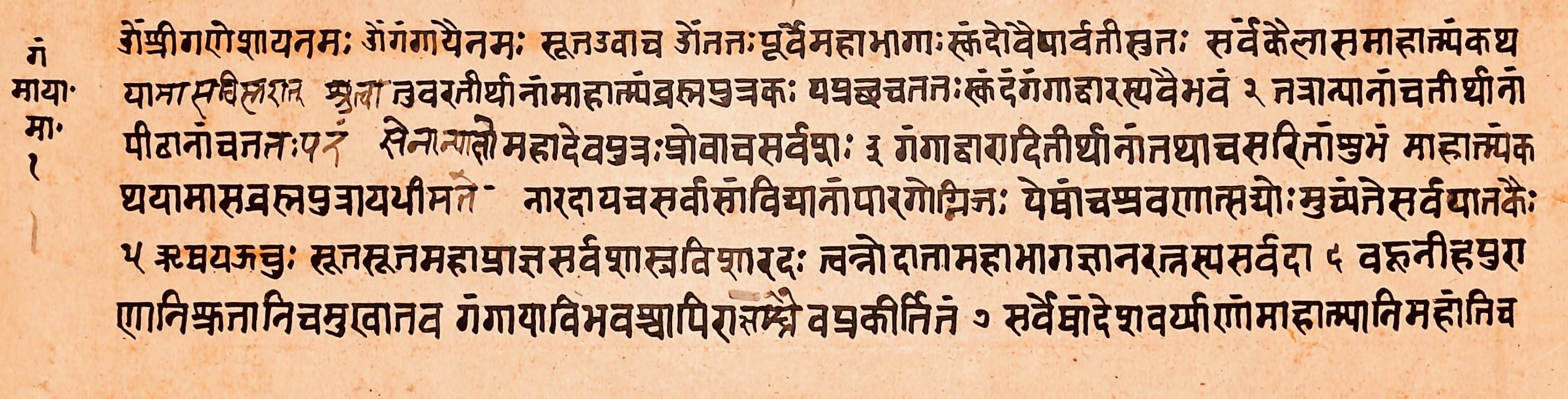
A page from the Ganga Mahatmya section of Skanda Purana in Sanskrit language and Devanagari script

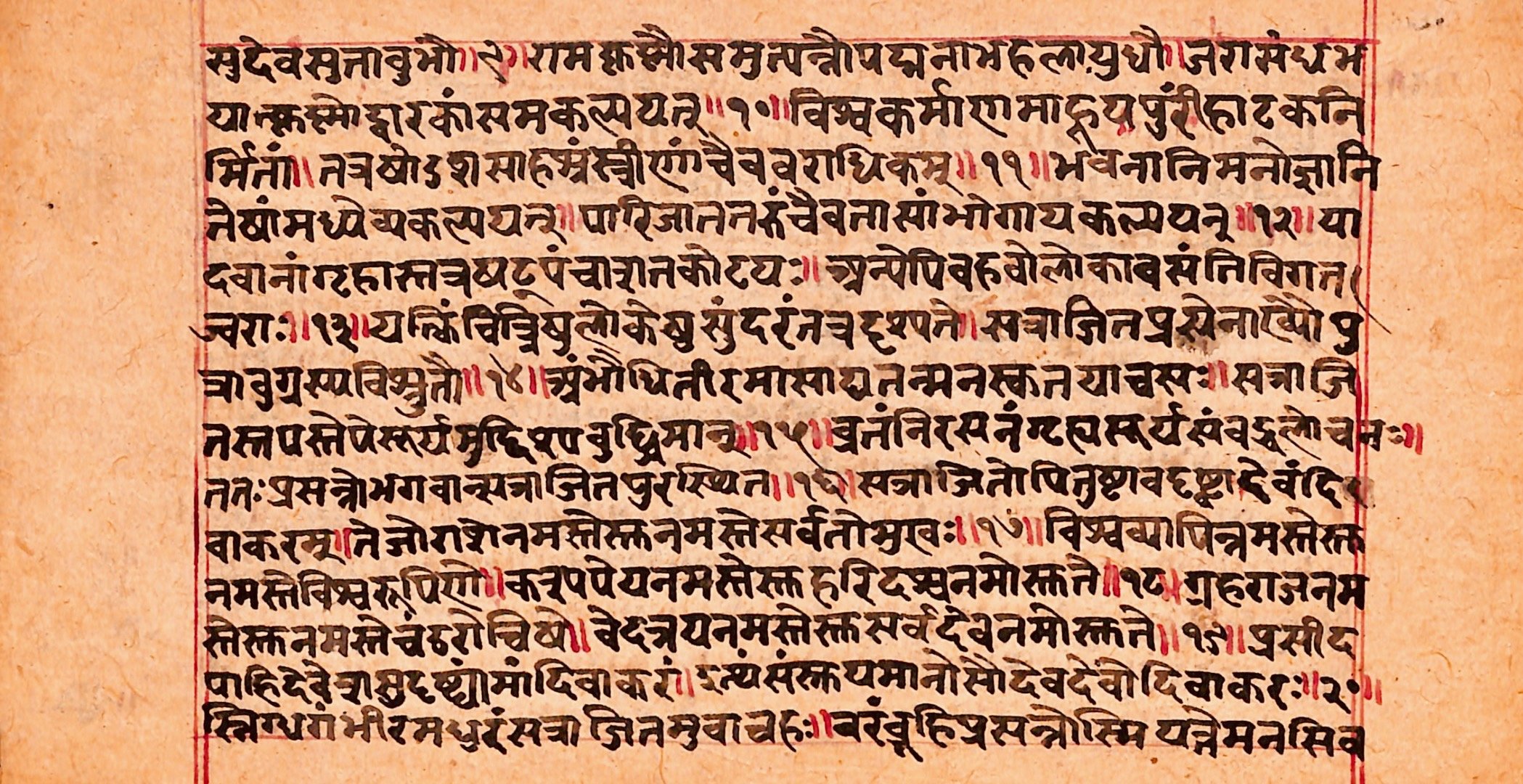
A page from the Skanda Purana manuscript in Sanskrit language and Devanagari script

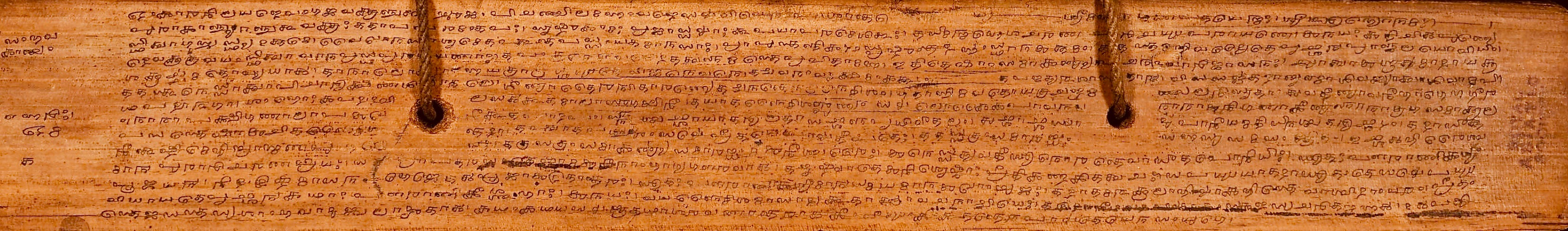
A leaf from a palm leaf of Skanda Purana manuscript book, held together by a thin rope

The Skanda Purana (IAST: Skanda Purāṇa) is the largest Mukhyapurāṇa, a genre of eighteen Hindu religious texts. The text contains over 81,000 verses, and is of Shaivite literature, titled after Skanda, a son of Shiva and Parvati (who is also known as Murugan in Tamil literature). While the text is named after Skanda, he does not feature either more or less prominently in this text than in other Shiva-related Puranas. The text has been an important historical record and influence on the Hindu traditions and rituals related to the war-god Skanda.

The earliest text titled Skanda Purana likely existed by the 8th century CE, but the Skanda Purana that has survived into the modern era exists in many versions. It is considered as a living text, which has been widely edited, over many centuries, creating numerous variants. The common elements in the variant editions encyclopedically cover cosmogony, mythology, genealogy, dharma, festivals, gemology, temples, geography, discussion of virtues and evil, of theology and of the nature and qualities of Shiva as the Absolute and the source of true knowledge.

The editions of Skandapurana text also provide an encyclopedic travel handbook with meticulous Tirtha Mahatmya (pilgrimage tourist guides), containing geographical locations of pilgrimage centers in India, Nepal and Tibet, with related legends, parables, hymns and stories.

This Mahāpurāṇa, like others, is attributed to the sage Vyasa.

== Date of composition ==
There are a number of texts and manuscripts that bear the title Skanda Purana. Some of these texts, except for the title, have little in common with the well-known Skanda Purana traced to the 1st millennium CE. The original text has accrued several additions, resulting in several different versions. It is, therefore, very difficult to establish an exact date of composition for the Skanda Purana. Although different authors from different time periods have been responsible for composing and redacting the material included in the Skanda Purana, it is a "fairly homogeneous work".

Haraprasad Shastri and Cecil Bendall, in about 1898, discovered an old palm-leaf manuscript of Skanda Purana in a Kathmandu library in Nepal, written in Gupta script. They dated the manuscript to 8th century CE, on paleographic grounds. This suggests that the original text existed before this time. R. Adriaensen, H.Bakker, and H. Isaacson dated the oldest surviving palm-leaf manuscript of Skanda Purana to 810 CE, but Richard Mann adds that earlier versions of the text likely existed in the 8th century CE. Hans Bakker states that the text specifies holy places and details about the 4th and 5th-century Citraratha of Andhra Pradesh, and thus may have an earlier origin. The oldest versions of the Skanda Purana texts have been discovered in Nepal in the Himalayas, and Assam in northeastern India. The critical editions of the text, for scholarly studies, rely on the Nepalese manuscripts.

Additional texts style themselves as khandas (sections) of Skanda Purana, but these came into existence after the 12th century. It is unclear if their root texts did belong to the Skanda Purana, and in some cases replaced the corresponding chapters of the original. The version of the earliest known recension was later expanded in two later versions namely the Revakhanda and Ambikakhanda recensions. The only surviving manuscript of the Revakhanda recension is from 1682. The four surviving manuscripts of the Ambikakhhnda recension are of a later period and contains much more alterations. Judit Törzsök says a similar recension to these two recensions seems to have been known to Laskhmidhara, thus it existed before 12th century. Ballala Sena quotes content found only in these two recensions, thus the version known at that time was similar to the ancient version of these two recensions.

== Structure ==
Stylistically, the Skanda Purana is related to the Mahabharata, and it appears that its composers borrowed from the Mahabharata. The two texts employ similar stock phrases and compounds that are not found in the Ramayana. Some of the mythology mentioned in the present version of the Skanda Purana is undoubtedly post-Gupta period, consistent with that of medieval South India. This indicates that several additions were made to the original text over the centuries. The Kashi Khanda, for example, acquired its present form around the mid-13th century CE. The latest part of the text might have been composed in as late as the 15th century CE.

== Contents ==
Tirtha: Holy Pilgrimage

Tirtha are of three kinds,
Jangam Tirtha is to a place movable,
of a sadhu, a rishi, a guru,
Sthawar Tirtha is to a place immovable,
like Benaras, Hardwar, Mount Kailash, holy rivers,
Manas Tirtha is to a place of mind,
of truth, charity, patience, compassion, soft speech, soul.

— Skanda Purana

The whole corpus of texts which are considered as part of the Skanda Purana is grouped in two ways. According to one tradition, these are grouped in six saṁhitās, each of which consists of several khaṇḍas. According to another tradition, these are grouped in seven khaṇḍas, each named after a major pilgrimage region or site. The chapters are Mahatmyas, or travel guides for pilgrimage tourists.

=== The seven khandas ===
The Maheśvara Khaṇḍa consists of 3 sections:

- the Kedāra Khaṇḍa (35 chapters, Kedarnath Tirtha region, north India)
- the Kaumārikā Khaṇḍa or Kumārikā Khaṇḍa (66 chapters, Mahisagara-samgama-tirtha or Cambay pilgrimage region, west India) and
- the Arunācala Khaṇḍa or Arunācala Māhātmya (37 chapters, Tiruvannamalai Tirtha region, south India), further divided into two parts:
  - Pūrvārdha (13 chapters) and
  - Uttarārdha (24 chapters)

The Viṣṇu Khaṇḍa or Vaiṣṇava Khaṇḍa consists of nine sections:

- Veṅkaṭācalamāhātmya (40 chapters, Tirupati Tirtha region, south India)
- Puruṣottamakṣetramāhātmya (49 chapters, Puri Odisha Tirtha region, east India)
- Badarikāśramamāhātmya (8 chapters, Badrinath Tirtha region, north India)
- Kārttikamāsamāhātmya (36 chapters)
- Mārgaśirṣamāsamāhātmya 17 chapters, Mathura Tirtha region)
- Bhāgavatamāhātmya (4 chapters)
- Vaiśākhamāsamāhātmya (25 chapters)
- Ayodhyāmāhātmya (10 chapters, Ayodhya Tirtha region) and
- Vāsudevamāhātmya (32 chapters)

The Brahma Khaṇḍa has three sections (four in some manuscripts):

- Setumāhātmya (52 chapters, Rama Setu Tirtha region, Tamil Nadu and towards Sri Lanka)
- Dharmāraṇya Khaṇḍa (40 chapters) and
- Uttara Khaṇḍa or Brahmottara Khaṇḍa (22 chapters)

The Kāśī Khaṇḍa (100 chapters, Varanasi and Vindhya Tirtha region) is divided into two parts:

- Pūrvārdha (50 chapters) and
- Uttarārdha (50 chapters)

The Āvantya Khaṇḍa consists of:

- Avantikṣetramāhātmya (71 chapters, Ujjain Tirtha region)
- Caturaśītiliṅgamāhātmya (84 chapters) and
- Rewā Khaṇḍa (Thought to have 232 chapters, Juergen Neuss states that the manuscripts attest this is actually the original Rewa Khanda of Vayu Purana which was wrongly included in the Skanda Purana by Veṅkateśvara Steam Press in 1910 and all publications of the Skanda after it. The one belonging to the Skanda has 116 chapters.)

The Nāgara Khaṇḍa (279 chapters) consists of Tirtha-māhātmya (Hāṭakeśvara-kṣetra or Vadnagar region). The Nāgara-khaṇḍa preserves a late Purāṇic enumeration in its account of the three Gaṇapatis at 6.142.26a, stating that there are "thirty-three crores of Devas stationed in heaven."

The Prabhāsa Khaṇḍa (491 chapters) consists of four sections:

- Prabhāsakṣetramāhātmya (365 chapters, Saurashtra and Somanatha Tirtha region, west India)
- Vastrāpathakṣetramāhātmya (19 chapters, Girnar Tirtha region)
- Arvuda Khaṇḍa (63 chapters, Aravalli Range Rajasthan Tirtha region) and
- Dvārakāmāhātmya (44 chapters, Dwarka Gujarat Tirtha region)

=== The six samhitas ===
The second type of division of the Skanda Purana is found in some texts like Hālasyamāhātmya of the Agastya Saṁhitā or the Śaṁkarī Saṁhitā, Sambhava Kāṇḍa of the Śaṁkarī Saṁhitā, Śivamāhātmya Khaṇḍa of the Sūta Saṁhitā and Kālikā Khaṇḍa of the Sanatkumāra Saṁhitā. According to these texts, the Skanda Purana consists of six saṁhitās (sections):

- the Sanatkumāra Saṁhitā
- the Sūta Saṁhitā
- the Śaṁkarī Saṁhitā
- the Vaiṣṇavī Saṁhitā
- the Brāhmī Saṁhitā and
- the Saura Saṁhitā

The manuscripts of the Sanatkumāra Saṁhitā, the Śaṁkarī Saṁhitā, the Sūta Saṁhitā and the Saura Saṁhitā are extant. A manuscript of a commentary on the Sūta Saṁhitā by Madhavācārya is also available. These texts discuss cosmogony, theology, philosophical questions on virtues and vice, questions such as what is evil, the origin of evil, how to deal with and cure evil.

=== The other texts ===
The manuscripts of several other texts which claim to be part of the Skanda Purāṇa are found partially or wholly. Some of the notable regional texts amongst these are: Himavat Khaṇḍa which contains Nepālamāhātmya (30 chapters, Nepal Tirtha region), Kanakādri Khaṇḍa, Bhīma Khaṇḍa, Śivarahasya Khaṇḍa, Sahyādri Khaṇḍa, Ayodhyā Khaṇḍa, Mathurā Khaṇḍa and Pātāla Khaṇḍa.

Kaverimahatmya presents stories and a pilgrim guide for the Kaveri river (Karnataka) and Coorg Tirtha region. Vivsamitrimahatmya presents mythology and a guide for the Vadodara Tirtha region.

The oldest known 1st-millennium palm-leaf manuscripts of this text mention many major Hindu pilgrimage sites, but do not describe Kailash-Manasarovar. The later versions do, particularly in Manasakhanda.

=== The narratives ===
The Skanda Purana, like many Puranas, include the legends of the Daksha's sacrifice, Shiva's sorrow, churning of the ocean (Samudra manthan) and the emergence of Amrita, the story of the demon Tarakasura, the birth of Goddess Parvati, her pursuit of Shiva, and her marriage to Lord Shiva, among others.

The central aim of the Skandapurana text, states Hans Bakker, is to sanctify the geography and landscape of South Asia, and legitimize the regional Shaiva communities across the land, as it existed at the time the edition was produced. The text reflects the political uncertainties, the competition with Vaishnavism, and the cultural developments with the Pashupata Hindus during the periods it was composed.

== Manuscripts ==
The Skanda Purana manuscripts have been found in Nepal, Tamil Nadu (Tamil: கந்த புராணம்) and other parts of India. The Skanda Purana is among of the oldest dated manuscripts discovered in Nepal. A palm-leaf manuscript of the text is preserved at the National Archives of Nepal (NAK 2–229), and its digital version has been archived by Nepal-German Manuscript Preservation Project (NGMCP B 11–4). It is likely that the manuscript was copied by the scribe on Monday, March 10 811 CE, though there is some uncertainty with this date because the samvat of this manuscript is unclear. Michael Witzel dates this Nepalese manuscript to about 810 CE. This manuscript was discovered as one in a group of seven different texts bound together. The group included fourteen manuscripts mostly Buddhist, six of which are very old Saddharma Pundarika Sutra manuscripts, one of Upalisutra, one Chinese Buddhist text, and one Bhattikavya Buddhist yamaka text. The Skanda Purana found in this manuscripts collection is written in transitional Gupta script, Sanskrit.

The 1910 edition included seven khaṇḍas (parts): Maheśvara, Viṣṇu or Vaiṣṇava, Brahma, Kāśī, Āvantya, Nāgara and Prabhāsa. In 1999–2003, an English translation of this text was published by the Motilal Banarsidass, New Delhi in 23 volumes. This translation is also based on a text divided into seven khaṇḍas.

=== Critical Edition ===
The Skandapurāṇa, vol. I, adhyāyas 1-25, edited by Rob Adriaensen, Hans T. Bakker, and Harunaga Isaacson, 1998; vol. IIa, adhyāyas 26-31.14, ed. by Hans T. Bakker and Harunaga Isaacson, 2005; vol. IIb, adhyāyas 31-52, ed. by Hans T. Bakker, Peter C. Bisschop, and Yuko Yokochi, 2014; vol. III, adhyāyas 34.1-61, 53-69, ed. by Yuko Yokochi, 2013. Supplement to the Groningen Oriental Studies, Groningen: Egbert Forsten, and Leiden: Brill.

== See also ==
- Guru Gita
- Bhagavata Purana
- Devi Mahatmya
- Kandapuranam
- Shiva Purana
