= Kokatnur =

- Village
- Location in Karnataka, India Kokatnur (India)
- Coordinates: 16.72°N 75.06°E
- Country: India
- State: Karnataka
- District: Belgaum
- Talukas: Athni

Population (2001)
  - Total: 6,123

Languages
  - Official: Kannada, Marathi
- Time zone: UTC+5:30 (IST)

Kokatnur is a village in the southern state of Karnataka, India. It is located in the Athni taluk of Belgaum district in Karnataka.

== Demographics ==
As of 2011 Population census, Kokatnur had a population of 4,252 people with 2,223 males and 2,029 females. The average sex ratio is 913. There are 687 people aged 0-6, with the child sex ratio being 784. Kannada is the official language. Marathi also spoken here.

== Notable people from Kokatnur ==
- Vaman R. Kokatnur, American chemist

== See also ==
- Belgaum
- Districts of Karnataka
