= Tummilla Lift Irrigation Project =

Tummilla Lift Irrigation Project is a lift irrigation project located in Jogulamba Gadwal district, Telangana State in India. It is being built at a cost Rupees 783 crores. Phase I of the project is expected to be completed by June 2018. It comes under Rajolibanda Diversion Scheme. It is expected to irrigate 87,000 acres in 87,000 acres in Gadwal and Alampur.
