= Basava Sagara =

Sagara Dam
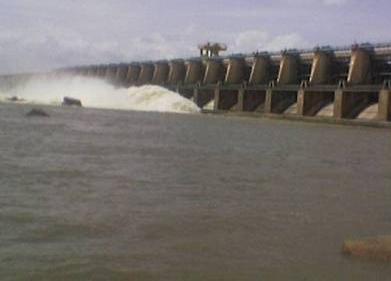
- Interactive map of Sagara Dam
- Official name: Basava Sagara Dam
- Location: Narayanpur, Karnataka, India
- Coordinates: 16°10′42″N 76°13′28″E
- Opening date: 1982

Dam and spillways
- Impounds: Krishna River
- Height: 29.72 metres (97.5 ft)
- Length: 10.637 km (6.610 mi)
- Width (base): 120 feet (37 m)

Reservoir
- Creates: Basava Sagara/ಬಸವ ಸಾಗರ
- Total capacity: 37.965 billion cubic feet (1.0750 km^{3})

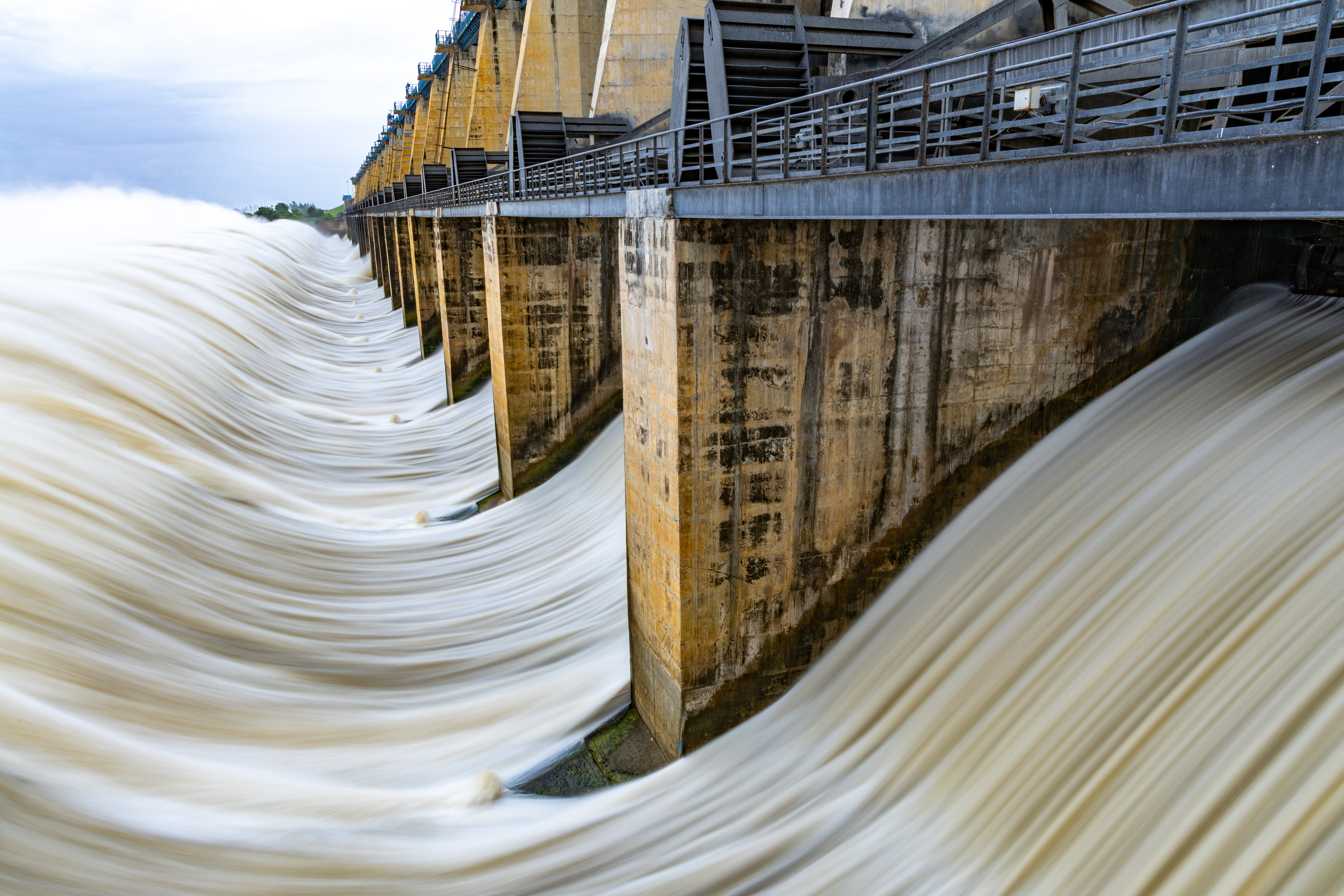
Spillway discharge at Narayanpur Dam on the Krishna River, Karnataka, India

Basava Sagar Dam, previously known as Narayanpura Dam, is a dam constructed across the Krishna River at Yadgir District, Karnataka State, India. The reservoir that it impounds is known as Basava Sagar, and has a total storage capacity of 37.965 tmcft (1.075 km^{3}), with 30.5 tmcft (0.85 km^{3}) live storage. The full reservoir level is 492.25 m MSL and the minimum draw down level is 481.6 m MSL. It was a single purpose project meant only for irrigation, but downstream electrical generation and drinking water considerations enter into its management. The dam is 29 meters high and over 10.637 kilometres (6.610 mi) long, and has 30 gates for water release. 22 Spillway Gates are present in the Dam It took Rs. 50.48 crore to complete.

== Gates ==
There are thirty spillway gates built into the dam. Each of these spillway gates are of the Ogee type. It is a common and basic design which transfers excess water from behind the dam down a smooth incline into the river below. These are usually designed following an ogee curve. Most often, they are lined on the bottom and sides with concrete to protect the dam and topography. The dam falls under the Parliamentary Constituency of Vijayapura, and it is classified as being an earthen/ gravity and masonry build type.

When it was completed in 1982 it provided water to irrigate 4.21 lakh hectares in Jewargi taluka in Kalaburagi district, Shahapur and Shorapur talukas in Yadgir district, Sindagi and Indi talukas in Bijapur district, and Lingsugur and Devadurga talukas in Raichur district.

== Future potential ==
Nearly 2000 MW capacity pumped hydroelectric energy storage (PHES) plant can be installed using the Basava Sagara reservoir as its upper reservoir. In the downstream of the dam, lower reservoir with 5 tmcft storage capacity can be located to utilize nearly 60 meters water head. PHES plant is a low cost method to store the excess power generated by the solar and wind power plants during the day time and make available for use during the night hours. Also substantial secondary hydro power can be generated using the flood water flows at no extra cost during the monsoon season. Also the downstream dam with 5 tmcft storage can have 200 MW hydro power capacity to generate secondary power from floodwaters during the monsoon season.

== Incidents ==
In 1992, two of the irrigation gates partially failed. In 2005, there was a collapse of one of the gates in the dam and up to a lakh cusecs of water was being released before emergency actions were effective. The gate broke open on the morning of 6 October and most of the water flow was stopped by the afternoon of the 9th. Basava Sagar reservoir dropped several metres as a result.

In April 2011, farmers fearing loss of their crops staged a protest at Narayanpur dam, and forced the staff to release water after officials had shut down releases due to low rainfall and inflows. This type of protests in earlier years, such as the one in April 2005 where large numbers of police prevented the farmer's from releasing the water. As of August 2013, the project has an estimated capacity of 31.47 TMC.

== See also ==
- Almatti Dam
- Upper Krishna Project
- Rajolibanda Diversion Scheme
