= Hulagabali =

Hulagabali Hulagabali
- Village
- Location in Karnataka, India Hulagabali (India)
- Coordinates: 16.72°N 75.06°E
- Country: India
- State: Karnataka
- District: Belgaum
- Talukas: Athani

Population (2001)
  - Total: 7,446

Languages
  - Official: Kannada
- Time zone: UTC+5:30 (IST)

Hulagabali is a village in the southern state of Karnataka, India. It is located in the Athani taluk toward north-east of Belgaum district. The basic occupation in Hulagabali is agriculture and there are also many landlords in the village who are famous in agriculture. Sugarcane is the highest percentage of agriculture as per the survey. There are quite a few temples in the village. The Birappa temple located in this village is well known in surrounding villages. Birappa temple has a large fair and festivities twice a year that draws huge crowd in the region. Sri Sangameshwara temple stands at the juncture of River Krishna and River Agrani. The famous landlords are Patil and Gaddekars.

== Famous landlords ==
- TERADAL
- Desai
- Patil
- Gaddekar

== Demographics ==
At the 2001 India census, Hulagabali had a population of 7446 with 3863 males and 3583 females.

== See also ==
- Belgaum
- Districts of Karnataka
