= Katageri =

- Village
- Country: India
- State: Karnataka
- District: Belgaum
- Talukas: Athani

Languages
  - Official: Kannada
- Time zone: UTC+5:30 (IST)

Katageri is a village located in Athani taluk Belgaum district, Karnataka, India.

== Demographics ==
The majority of the people are farmers. Villagers are educated and the literacy rate is significantly high. Many people works in government jobs, such as teachers, soldiers, police officers etc.

== Agriculture ==
Farmers mainly grow sugar cane, wheat, turmeric, ground nut, and Jowar.
