= Athani Rural =

Athani (Rural)
- Village
- Location in Karnataka, India Athani (Rural) (India)
- Coordinates: 16.72°N 75.06°E
- Country: India
- State: Karnataka
- District: Belgaum
- Talukas: Athani

Population (2001)
  - Total: 11,255

Languages
  - Official: Kannada
- Time zone: UTC+5:30 (IST)

Athani (Rural) is a rural area in India's southern state of Karnataka. It is located in the Athani taluk of Belagavi district.

== Demographics ==
As of 2001 India census, Athani (Rural) had a population of 11,255 with 5,891 males and 5,364 females.

== See also ==
- Belgaum
- Districts of Karnataka
