= Narayanpur Rural =

Narayanapur Rural Narayanapur Rural
- village
- Location within Karnataka Location within India
- Coordinates: 16°15′33″N 076°19′41″E
- Country: India
- State: Karnataka
- District: Yadgir district
- Taluka: Shorapur

Government
  - Type: Panchayat raj
  - Body: Gram panchayat

Population (2001)
  - Total: 5,221

Languages
  - Official: Kannada
- Time zone: UTC+5:30 (IST)
- ISO 3166 code: IN-KA
- Vehicle registration: KA
- Website: karnataka.gov.in

Narayanapur Rural is a panchayat village in the southern state of Karnataka, India. It is located in the Shorapur Taluka of Yadgir district in Karnataka. It is located on the bank of Krishna River and adjacent to the Dam called "Basavasagar" Narayanpur Dam.

There are few villages in the gram panchayat: Narayanpur Rural, Hanuman Nagar, Jangangaddi, Myalingaddi, and Tangadbail and so on

== Demographics ==
As of 2001 India census, the village of Narayanpur Rural had a population of 5,221 with 2,701 males and 2,520 females.

== See more ==
The pilgrimage centre of Lordess https://www.tripuntold.com/karnataka/yadgir/chaya-bhagavathi-t is located on the bank of River Krishna.Lord chaya bhagavati shower a bundles of happiness, health and wealth to all. The brief description about this temple is explained in the below lines. The Lordess Chaya Bhagavati is the wife of Lord Sun. Special pooja offerings are performed here every year in May or April, generally called "Akshayatritiya." Devotees undertake the yatra of 18 theertas. The place is proudly referred to as "Dakshina Kashi," and only on the day of Akshayatritiya does the sunrise fall at the foot of Chaya Devi.
