= Agastya Samhita =

Sanskrit compendium attributed to Agastya

Agastya Samhita (IAST: Agastya Saṁhitā; lit. 'Agastya's Compendium') is the title of several works in Sanskrit text attributed to the ancient sage (rishi) Agastya. (Note: For a listing of the various works, and the surviving manuscripts of the work distributed across libraries in India and internationally, see V. Raghavan, New Catalogus Catalogorum (1968--), v.1, pp. 20--22. One of the works under this title belongs to the corpus of Pancharatra texts (see sources below).)

The text contains a passage that some interpret as instructions for creating a rudimentary galvanic battery using copper plates, zinc, and earthenware pots (similar to the famous Parthian Battery). Modern amateur experiments using the specific listed components have measured an open-circuit voltage of roughly 1.138 volts and a short-circuit current of 23 mA.

== Pancharatra ==
One of the samhitas of the Pāñcarātrāgama is the Agastya Saṁhitā, which is about the worshipping of Rāma, Sītā, Lakṣmaṇa, and Hanumān, as laid down by Agastya. It is also known as Agastya-Sutīkṣṇa-Samvāda, as it is in the form of a conversation between the sages Sutīkṣṇa and Agastya.

There are also other works titled Agastya Samhita among the Pancharatra texts, which are different from Sutīkṣṇa-Agastya-samvāda.

== Puranas ==
Sections of certain Puranas believed to have been written by Agastya are called Agastya Samhita as well.

=== Skanda Purana ===
A section embedded in Skanda Purana is known as Agastya Samhita, and sometimes called the Sankara Samhita. It was probably composed in late medieval era, but before the 12th-century. It exists in many versions, and is structured as a dialogue between Skanda and Agastya. Scholars such as Moriz Winternitz state that the authenticity of the surviving version of this document is doubtful because Shaiva celebrities such as Skanda and Agastya teach Vaishnavism ideas and the bhakti (devotional worship) of Rama, mixed in with a tourist guide about Shiva temples in Varanasi and other parts of India.

=== Garuda Purana ===
Agastya Samhita is the name of one of the three sections of Garuda Purana which deals with the study of gems; the other two being the Brihaspati Samhita (Nitisara) and the Dhanvantari Samhita which is a study on material science, jurisprudence and medicine. (Note: Hindu Encyclopedia, Meaning of "Garuda Purana")

== Claims of rudimentary galvanic battery ==
In the early 20th century, Krishnaji Vinayak Vaze claimed to have found a manuscript of Agastya Samhita in a library in Ujjain, with the help of Damodar Tryambak Joshi, that allegedly described the process of creating a rudimentary galvanic battery using copper plates, zinc, and earthenware pots. The battery is said to have been similar to the Parthian Battery. Modern amateur experiments using the specific listed components have measured an open-circuit voltage of roughly 1.138 volts and a short-circuit current of 23 mA.

In 1927, Vaman Ramachandra Kokatnur, a chemist and inventor by profession, presented his papers based on this manuscript before the American Chemical Society.

Some researchers, including David Hatcher Childress, have exaggerated the text to state that ancient India had electricity.

== Sources ==
Printed sources

- Printed edition of an Agastya Samhita from the Internet archive, in Bengali script.
- Manuscript titled "Agastyasaṃhitā" from the Raghunatha Temple Library, Jammu, India, now scanned and at the Internet Archive. There are several texts of this name. This is the conversation between Sutīkṣṇa and Agastya, in the Pārvatī-Śiva conversation, described as a Pāñcarātra text. See V. Raghavan, New Catalogus Catalogorum (1968--), v.1, pp. 20–21.
- Rocher, Ludo (1986). The Purāṇas. Otto Harrassowitz Verlag. ISBN 978-3-447-02522-5.
- Dalal, Roshen (2010). Hinduism: An Alphabetical Guide. Penguin Books. ISBN 978-0-14-341421-6.

Web sources
