= Almatti Dam =

Dam in North Karnataka, India

Lal Bahadur Shastri Dam
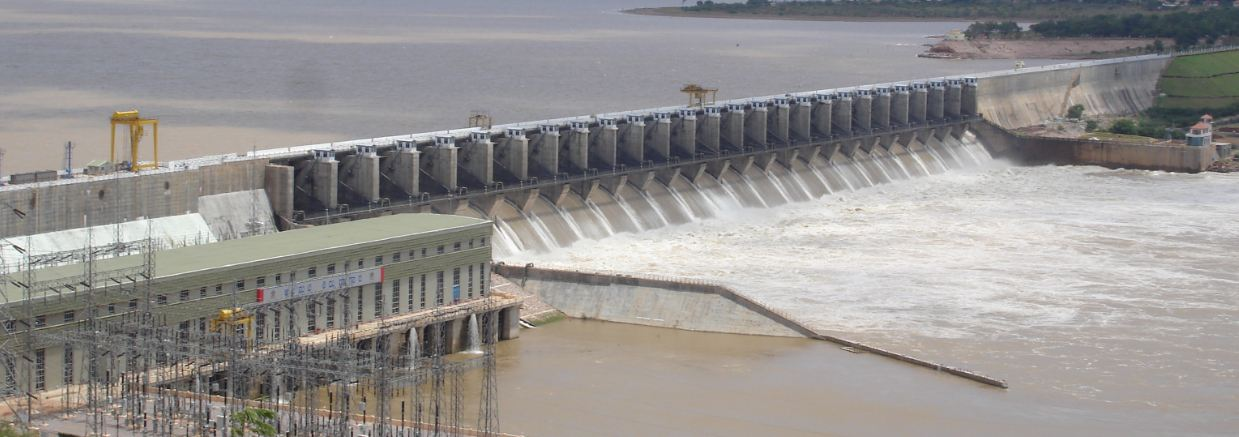
- Almatti Dam with its right bank power house
- Interactive map of Lal Bahadur Shastri Dam
- Official name: Upper Krishna-I (Almatti)
- Location: Almatti, Nidgundi, Bijapur district, Karnataka
- Coordinates: 16.331°N 75.888°E
- Construction began: 1997
- Opening date: July 2005
- Construction cost: ₹ 520 crores
- Operator: Karnataka Power Corporation Limited

Dam and spillways
- Impounds: Krishna River
- Height: 49.3m
- Length: 1565.15 m

Reservoir
- Total capacity: 123.08 Tmcft at 519 m MSL
- Catchment area: 33,375 sq. km
- Surface area: 24,230 hectares
- Minimum Draw Down Level : 504.75 m MSL

The Lal Bahadur Shastri Dam is also known as Almatti Dam is a hydroelectric project on the Krishna River in North Karnataka, India which was completed in July 2005. The target annual electric output of the dam is 560 MU (or GWh).

The Almatti Dam is the main reservoir of the Upper Krishna Irrigation Project; the 290 MW power station is located on the right side of the Almatti Dam. The facility uses vertical Kaplan turbines: five 55MW generators and one 15MW generator. Water is released in to the Narayanpur reservoir after using for power generation to serve the downstream irrigation needs. Two separate facilities namely, Almatti 1 Powerhouse and Almatti II Powerhouse each separated by distance do provide power generation capabilities.

During the initial stages of the project, estimated costs were projected as ₹ 1,470 crores, but following the transfer of project's management to the Karnataka Power Corporation Limited (KPCL), the estimated cost was reduced by over fifty percent to ₹ 674 crores. KPCL eventually completed the project at an even lower cost of ₹ 520 crores. The entire dam was finished in less than forty months, with construction ending in July 2005. The dam is located on the edge of Vijayapura and Bagalkote districts. Geographically, it is located in the Vijayapura district, but large areas of Bagalkote district have also been submerged due to filling of the reservoir. The dam holds a gross water storage capacity of 123.08 TMC at 519 meters MSL. The backwaters of the dam host several migratory birds during summer.

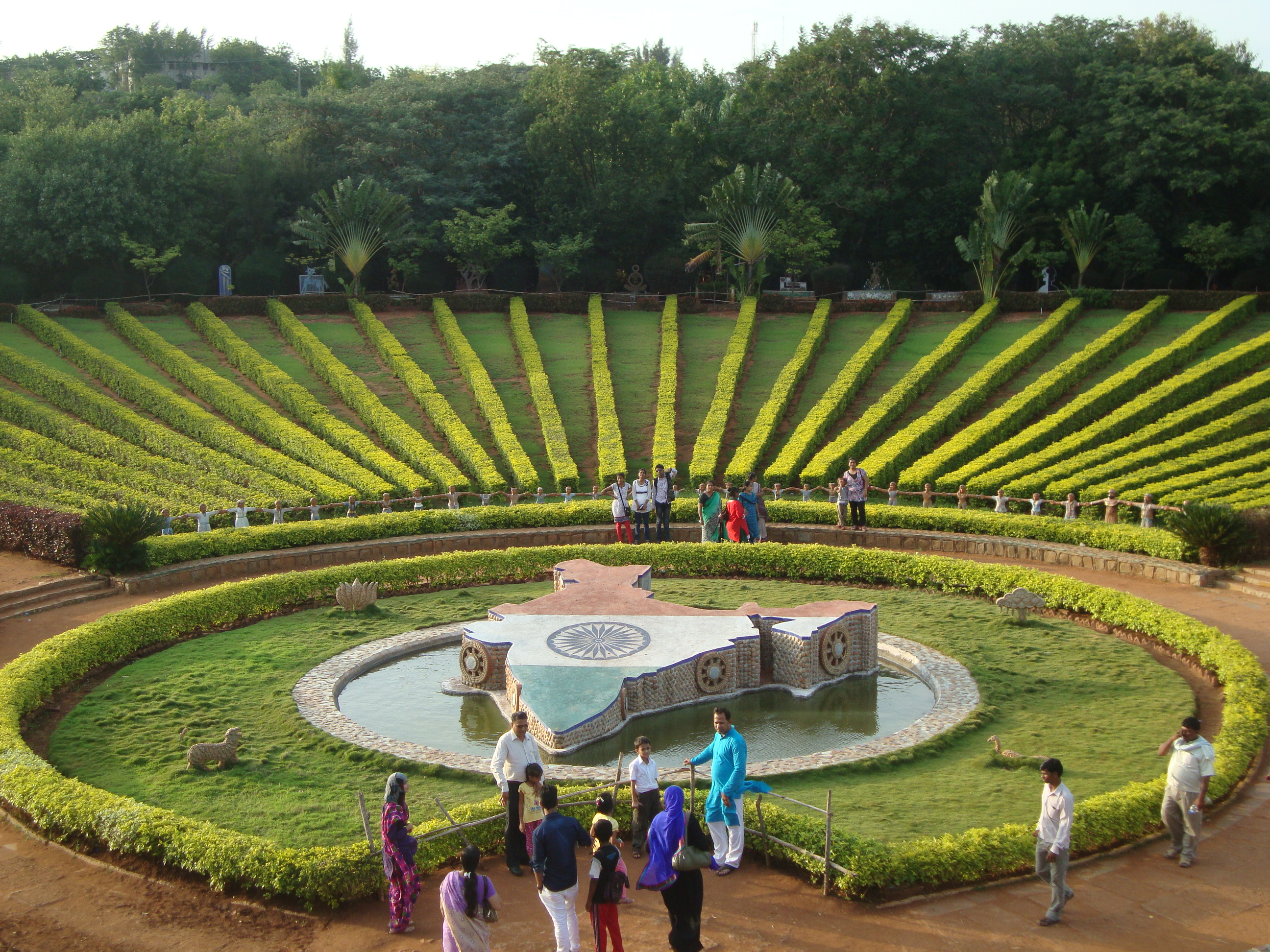
Lal Bahaddur Shastri Dam, Alamatti

== Height ==
The full reservoir level of Almatti dam was originally restricted to 160 feet MSL by the supreme court of India. The Krishna River conflict between Andhra Pradesh, Karnataka, and Maharashtra was resolved by the Brijesh Kumar Tribunal and the dam was authorized to be raised to the height of 524 feet MSL with nearly 200 TMC gross storage capacity. 26 different radial spillway gates are housed in the Dam.

== See also ==
- Aihole
- Badami
- Banashankari
- Krishna Water Disputes Tribunal
- Kudalasangama
- Mahakuta
- North Karnataka
- Pattadakal
- Tourism in North Karnataka
- Upper Krishna Project
- Vijayapur
- List of dams and reservoirs in India
- Narayanapura Dam
