= Agrani River =

Agrani River (अग्रणी नदी)
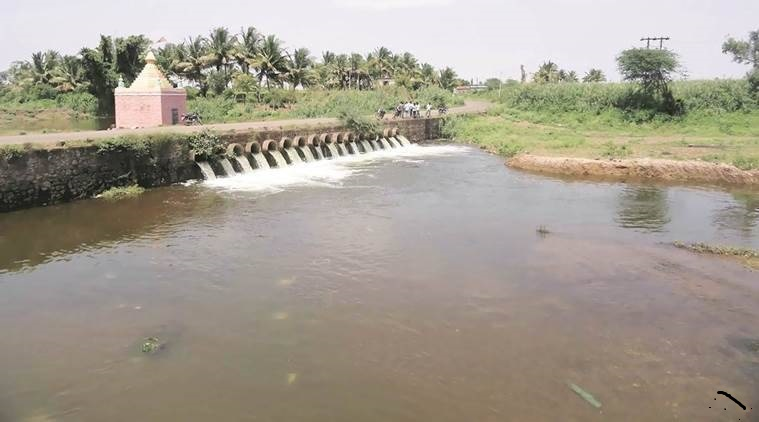

Location
- Country: India
- State: Maharashtra, Karnataka
- District: Sangli; Belgaum
- City: Shirdhon(शिरढोण), Hingangaon (हिंगणगाव), Sambargi (संबरगी)

Physical characteristics
- Mouth: Krishna River
  - coordinates: 16°39′41″N 74°57′50″E
- Length: 97 km (60 mi)

Basin features
- River system: Krishna River

The Agrani river originates near Balwadi (बलवडी) on Khanapur plateau (Khanapur tehsil of Sangli district), near a small tree temple of great Agastya rishi (अगस्त्य ऋषी). After Vajrachounde (वज्रचौंडे) (Tasgaon tehsil), it turns and flows in a southeast direction.

In Sangli district, it travels for 62 km (Khanapur tehsil- 22.5 km; Tasgaon tehsil- 14 km; KM tehsil- 25.5 km), after which, in Karnataka near Athani village it finally joins the Krishna River. Agrani is proved to be lifeline of draught prone Kavathe Mahankal tehsil.

The river has also been the subject of a major desilting project.

Agrani river rejuvenation project is being implemented under Jalyukt Shivar Abhiyan. This project is proving very effective in rejuvenating the lost river at its origin.
