= Upper Krishna Project =

Irrigation project in Karnataka, India

The Upper Krishna Project (UKP) is an irrigation project across the Krishna River to provide irrigation to the drought-prone areas of Vijayapura district, Karnataka, Bagalkot, Kalburgi, Yadgir and Raichur districts in the state of Karnataka in south India. The project had been designed by the Government of Karnataka to irrigate 1,536,000 acres of land (6,220 km^{2}).

== Overview ==
The foundation stone for the project was laid by the then Indian prime minister Lal Bahadur Shastri on 22 May 1964. It was designed to irrigate 1,536,000 acres of land in Gulbarga, Raichur, Bijapur, Bagalkot and now Yadgir. UKP intends to use the bulk of 173 thousand million cubic feet (tmcft) of water allocated to the state of Karnataka by the Krishna Water Disputes Tribunal, headed by R. S. Bachawat Tribunal, in May 1976. The initial estimation of the cost of the project was ₹120 crore (US$13 million); however, after many revisions, the final cost of the project reached ₹10,371.67 crore (US$1.1 billion), and it took 42 years for the project to be completed. 201 villages were affected by the project and 136 villages were completely submerged in the backwaters of the reservoirs constructed as a part of the project.

=== UKP-Stage I ===
Stage I of the UKP plans to use 119 tmcft of water and irrigate 4250 km^{2} of land on the left bank of the Krishna River. It involves construction of Almatti Dam and Narayanpur Dam along with several other canals.

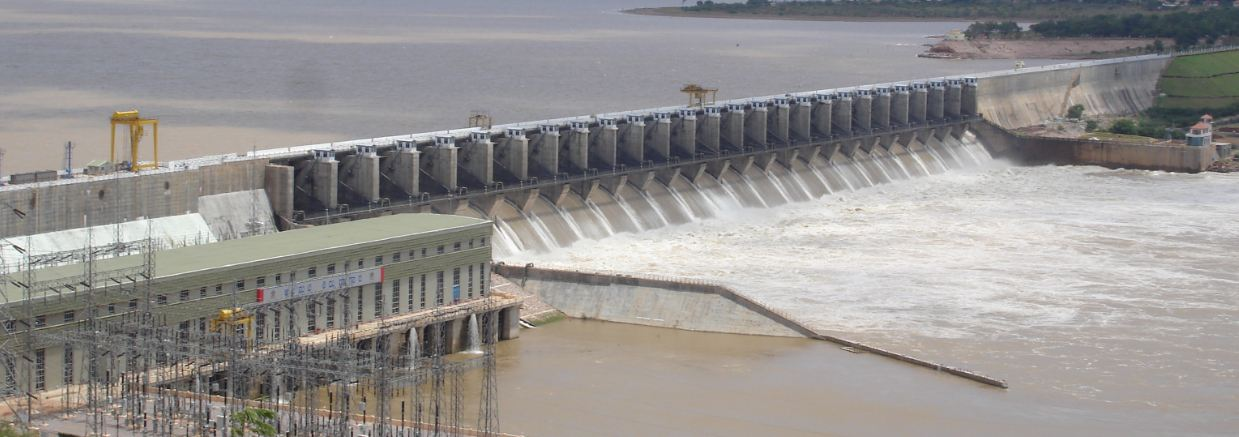
Almatti Dam constructed as a part of the UKP project

UKP-Stage I
Works	Area irrigated (km^{2})
Narayanpur Dam and allied works	Not Applicable
Almatti Dam up to 519 m FRL	Not Applicable
Construction of Narayanpur Left Canal	472.23
Construction of Shapur Branch Canal	1221.2
Construction of Mudbal Branch Canal	510
Construction of Indi Branch Canal	1312.6
Construction of Jewargi Branch Canal	571
Construction of Almatti Left Bank Canal (77 km of Initial Work)	162
TOTAL	4249.03

=== UKP-Stage II ===
Stage II of the UKP plans to use 54 tmcft of water and irrigate 1971.20 km^{2} of land. It involves irrigation on the right bank of the river by the flow and also by lifting the waters to higher levels on both left and right banks. The project mainly involved construction of channels.

UKP-Stage II
Works	Area irrigated (km^{2})
Almatti Right Bank Canal	161.00
Rampur Lift Irrigation Scheme	202.35
Narayanpur Right Bank Canal up to 95 km	840.00
Indi Lift Irrigation Scheme	419.00
Mulwad Lift Irrigation Scheme	308.50
Almatti Left Bank Canal extension	47.35
TOTAL	1971.20

Hipparagi barrage

This project also includes construction of Hipparagi barrage (near 16°33′09″N 75°09′58″E ) in the upstream of Almatti dam with maximum water level and FRL at 531.4 m MSL and barrage crest level at 516.635 m MSL in Athani taluq of Belagavi district. Hipparagi barrage with 4.9 tmcft live storage capacity supplies irrigation water to nearly 60,000 acres by Ainapur and Halyal lift canals.

=== UKP-Stage III ===
The Karnataka government on 3 December 2011 unveiled a five-year action plan to fully use its share of water in the Krishna River basin. Stage III of UKP would use 130 tmcft of water. The Karnataka government would be spending ₹17,000 crore (US$1.8 billion) to complete the third stage of the project.

Stage III consists of increasing the full reservoir water level of Alamatti Dam to 524 metres (1,719 ft) and this would require the relocation of 30 villages. One lakh acres (405 km^{2}) of land would be submerged.

UKP stage III would involve lift irrigation schemes at Mulwad, Chimmalagi, and Indi and extension of the Narayanapura Right Bank Canal and Bhima diversion plan. Stage III would also involve the extension of lift irrigation schemes at Rampur, Mallabad, Koppal and Herakal.

== Major benefits ==
The major beneficiary of the project would be Kalaburagi district with around 950,000 acres of land coming under irrigation. A hydel power generation plant of installed capacity of 297 MW has been contemplated at Almatti, which it is estimated would generate about 672 million units annually. This work has been assigned to KPCL, a Karnataka Government company. It is expected to increase the production of food grains and cash crops in the command area of the UKP, adding ₹6,000 crore (US$640 million) to the country's economy annually and stimulating prosperity and growth in the otherwise drought-prone and economically backward districts of the north eastern part of Karnataka. The project is also intended to provide drinking water to 18 urban and several rural centres.

== Major difficulties ==
=== Financial ===
Delays and the level of cost over-runs lead to charges of cronyism and corruption. A first information report (FIR) was filed by police on 26 Oct 2011 in connection with alleged financial irregularities in awarding the contracts to the tune of ₹400 crore (US$43 million) in the project during 1995–1998. The FIR filed did not name anyone. Former prime minister H. D. Deve Gowda after becoming the Prime Minister of India, amended the rule to release the funds for water projects of the states and released 700 cr to the state of Karnataka which not only helped Karnataka, but all states for their water projects. Even though several CM's came and went but not finished this project since 15 years. Totally dam work started 45 years back but not completed till today. Due to this Karnataka Government lost huge agricultural income and loss to ex-chequer.

=== Maintenance ===
Lack of proper maintenance has been a recurring concern, especially after disasters such as the collapse of a main gate at the Narayanpur Dam.

=== Human ===
Human costs included the large number of displaced persons and the loss of community. Thousands of farmers lost their land due to this project, farmers land was sunk into backwater as well as dam water and became stranded. Huge i.e. more than 60sq.km land was submerged in Almatti Dam water, citizens lost their homes, homeland and farmland and society because of this project. Nearly 3000 villages sunk under dam water have now become displaced, stranded and spread out in Karnataka and surrounding states. Citizens and citizen farmers sacrificed their life, land and society.

== See also ==
- S. G. Balekundri
