= Telsang =

- Village
- Location in Karnataka, India Telsang (India)
- Coordinates: 16°47′30.402″N 75°20′24.219″E
- Country: India
- State: Karnataka
- District: Belagavi
- Talukas: Athani (Karnataka)

Population (2011)
  - Total: 10,407

Languages
  - Official: Kannada
- Time zone: UTC+5:30 (IST)
- PIN: 591265
- Telephone code: 08289-276476
- Vehicle registration: KA-71
- Nearest city: Bijapur 42 km, Athani 32 km, Jamakhandi 37 km and Jatt 33 km
- Climate: Little Hot (Köppen)

Telsang is a village in the southern state of Karnataka, India. It is located in the Athni taluk of Belgaum district in Karnataka.

== Demographics ==
As of the 2001 India census, Telsang had a population of 8,407 with 4,295 males and 4,112 females.

== See also ==
- Belgaum
- Districts of Karnataka
