= Ainapur, Athni =

Ainapur
- Town
- Location in India Ainapur (India)
- Coordinates: 16°40′14.541″N 74°53′35.316″E
- Country: India
- State: Karnataka
- District: Belgaum
- Taluk: Kagawad

Government
  - Body: Pattan Panchayat

Population (2011)
  - Total: 18,913

Languages
  - Official: Kannada
- Time zone: UTC+5:30 (IST)
- PIN: 591303
- Telephone code: 08339
- Vehicle registration: KA 23
- Lok Sabha constituency: Chikkodi
- Vidhan Sabha constituency: Kagwad
- Civic agency: Town Panchayat
- Climate: Sunny (Köppen)
- Nearest city: Belgaum
- Nearest Railway: Ugar Khurd

Ainapur is a town in the southern state of Karnataka, India. It is located in the Athani taluk of Belgaum district in Karnataka. Ainapur village is famous for Peda, the village situated near river Krishna. Sugarcane is the chief cultivated crop and Kannada is the primary spoken language.

== Demographics ==
Census of Ainapur : Pin code 591303
Year	# Population	# Males	# Females	Literacy %	Male Literacy %	Female Literacy %
2001	18193	9555	8638			
2011	18913	9555	9358	64.5	71.3	57.6

== Climate ==
Being situated in upper region of Belagavi district which lies in the elevated terrain of north-western Karnataka, Ainapur has a tropical climate. It is known for its moderate climate throughout the year. Ainapur receives rainfall from both the northeast and the southwest monsoons and the wettest months are June–September. It has a distinct normal climate in every season. Extreme climate should not be found here. The June and August months have a good deal of rainfall, while the winters have very little. The coldest month is December with an average low temperature of 25.3 °C and the hottest month is May with an average high temperature of 40 °C. Winter temperatures rarely drop below 20 °C (54 °F), and summer temperatures seldom exceed 30–40 °C. The driest month is January, with 10 mm of rainfall.

== See also ==
- Belgaum
- Districts of Karnataka
