= Jawar =

Jawar जावर (Hindi)
- Village
- Location in Madhya Pradesh, India
- Coordinates: 21°55′52″N 76°26′55″E
- Country: India
- State: Madhya Pradesh
- District: Khandwa
- Elevation: 294 m (965 ft)

Population (2001)
  - Total: 7,131

Languages
  - Official: Hindi
- Time zone: UTC+5:30 (IST)
- ISO 3166 code: IN-MP
- Vehicle registration: MP 12

Jawar is a village and a gram panchayat in Khandwa district in the Indian state of Madhya Pradesh.

== Geography ==
Jawar is located at 21.93°N 76.45°E. It has an average elevation of 294 metres (964 feet).

== Demographics ==
As of 2001 India census, Jawar had a population of 7,131. Males constitute 52% of the population and females 48%. Jawar has an average literacy rate of 53%, lower than the national average of 59.5%: male literacy is 65%, and female literacy is 40%. In Jawar, 18% of the population is under 6 years of age.
