= Hipparagi =

- village
- Location in Karnataka, India Hipparagi (India)
- Coordinates: 16.5571°N 75.1757°E
- Country: India
- State: Karnataka
- District: Bagalkot
- Founder: payagon
- Talukas: Jamkhandi

Population (2011)
  - Total: 8,560

Languages
  - Official: Kannada
- Time zone: UTC+5:30 (IST)

Hipparagi is a village in the southern state of Karnataka, India. It is located in the "'Jamkhandi"' taluk of Bagalkot district in Karnataka. Sangameshwar temple is most popular in Hipparagi and also famous for Krishna river, Hipparagi Barrage. ಹಿಪ್ಪರಗಿ ಗ್ರಾಮ ಲೆಕ್ಕಾಧಿಕಾರಿಗಳು ಕಾರ್ಯಾಲಯ

== Demographics ==
As of 2001 India census, Hipparagi had a population of 6913 with 3560 males and 3353 females.

== See also ==
- Bagalkot
- Districts of Karnataka
