= Shedbal =

- Location in Karnataka, India Shedbal (India)
- Coordinates: 16.689166°N 74.754256°E
- Country: India
- State: Karnataka
- District: Belagavi
- Talukas: Kagwad

Population (2011)
  - Total: 15,278

Languages
  - Official: Kannada
- Time zone: UTC+5:30 (IST)
- Postal code: 591315
- Telephone code: 08339
- Vehicle registration: KA-23
- Lok Sabha constituency: Chikkodi
- Vidhan Sabha constituency: Kagwad
- Civic agency: town Panchayat
- Climate: Sunny (Köppen)
- Nearest city: Belagavi
- Nearest Railway: Shedbal Railway Station
- Website: www.shedbaltown.mrc.gov.in

Shedbal is a town in Kagwad, a taluk of Belagavi district in the southern state of Karnataka, India.

== Demographics ==
As of 2011 India census, Shedbal had a population of 15,278 with 7752 males and 7526 females.

== See also ==
- Belagavi
