= Athani taluk =

Athani Taluk
- Taluk
- Location in Karnataka, India
- Coordinates: 16.73°N 75.07°E
- Country: India
- State: Karnataka
- District: Belgaum
- Regions of Karnataka: Bayaluseeme

Government
  - Type: Taluk administration

Area
  - Total: 2,070.54 km^{2} (799.44 sq mi)

Population (2011)
  - Total: 548,832
  - Density: 265.067/km^{2} (686.521/sq mi)

Languages
  - Official: Kannada
- Time zone: UTC+5:30 (IST)
- PIN: 591xxx
- Vehicle registration: KA-23

Athani Taluk is the largest taluk in Belgaum District, Karnataka, India. It has a total area of 2,070.54 square kilometres (799.44 sq mi), of which 70% is cultivated. This includes 4 towns, 115 inhabited villages and hamlets with a rural population of 4,07,485, according to the 2011 census. The total population of the taluk is 5,25,832. It is bounded by Sangli District of Maharashtra in the north, Bijapur District in the east, and Bagalkot District in the southeast. Geologically the area is covered by Deccan Trap formations. The average annual rainfall is 582 millimetres (22.9 in). Two rivers flow through the taluk: the Krishna River and the Agrani.

The four largest towns of Athani Taluk (in decreasing order of population) are Athani, Ugar, Ainapur and Shedbal. There are four hobalis in the taluk: Athani, Kagwad, Telsang and Antapur.

== Educational institutions ==
Athani has government and primary schools for boys and girls in Kannada, Urdu and Marathi.

== Agriculture ==
The Krishna River flows 85 kilometres (53 mi) around the southern part of the taluk. The irrigation facilities of the Upper Krishna Project's Hipparagi dam are in Athani taluk. As part of the Hipparagi project, canals were constructed in Athani, assisting the cultivation of sugarcane, grapes and other crops. 70% of the land in the taluk is fertile.

== Notable people ==
- Laxman Savadi, Former DCM of Karnataka government
- Sampat Shivangi, Awardee, Pravasi Bharatiya Samman
- Sudheendra Kulkarni, Former Director of Operations to the Prime Ministers Office during the term of Atal Bihari Vajapayee
