= Athani, Belagavi =

Athani
- City
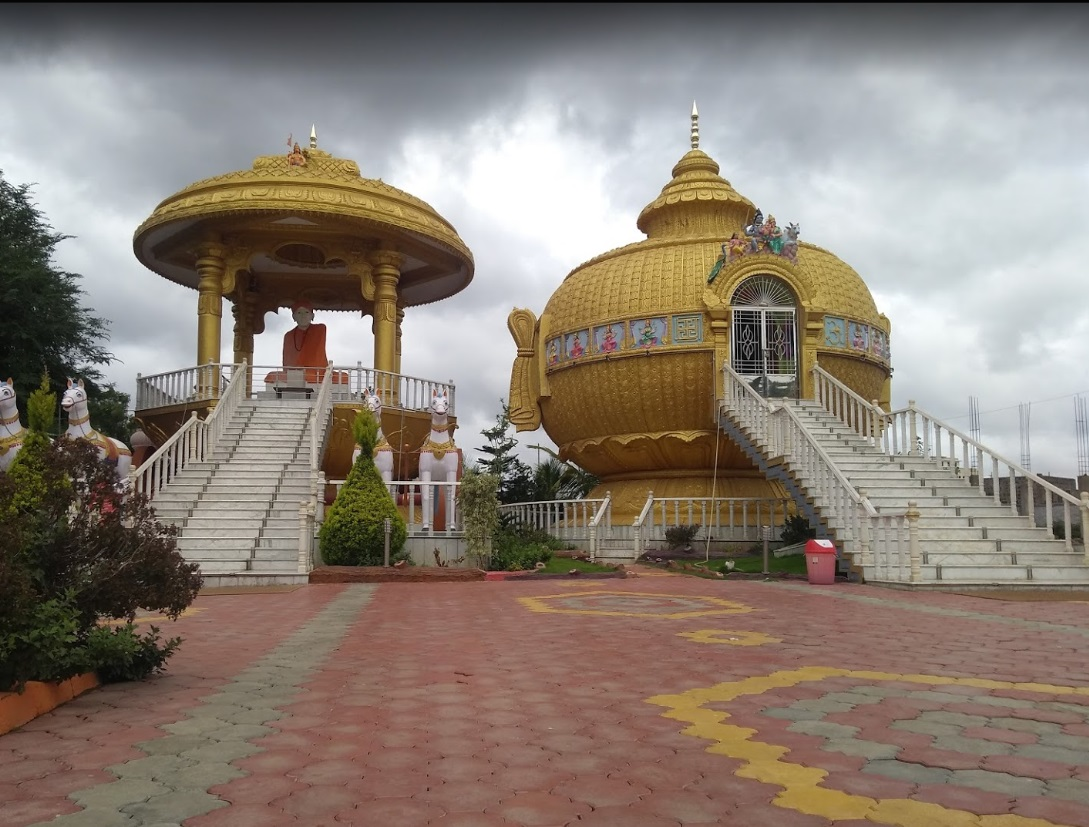

- Location in Karnataka, India
- Coordinates: 16.73°N 75.07°E
- Country: India
- State: Karnataka
- District: Belagavi
- Regions of Karnataka: Bayaluseeme
- City municipal council: 1853

Government
  - Body: City municipal council
  - Member of legislative assembly: Shri Laxman Savadi

Area
  - City: 9.1 km^{2} (3.5 sq mi)
  - Rural: 1,986 km^{2} (767 sq mi)
- Elevation: 590 m (1,940 ft)

Population (2011)
  - City: 47,842
  - Density: 5,300/km^{2} (14,000/sq mi)
  - Rural: 479,974

Languages
  - Official: Kannada
- Time zone: UTC+5:30 (IST)
- PIN: 591304
- Telephone code: 08289
- Vehicle registration: KA 23 Chikkodi; KA 71 Athani
- Sex ratio: 958 ♂/♀
- Website: www.athanitown.mrc.gov.in

Athani is a town in the Belagavi district of Karnataka, India. It is 140 kilometers from the city of Belagavi, 70 kilometers from Vijayapura, 55 kilometers from Miraj, 100 kilometers from Kolhapur, and 624 kilometers from Bengaluru.

The main profession here is Business & agriculture, particularly cultivation of sugarcane, jowar, and grapes, The town has Cottage & Medium Scale Industries. The river Krishna flows 110 km around the southern part of Athani Taluk. The city is 18 km from river Krishna. It is famous for leather chappals. Athani is the oldest municipal town of Karnataka; it was established in 1853, according to the Municipal Act of 1850. The municipal council completed 160 years. In December 2025, it was upgraded to the City municipal council. Athani serves as an important gateway to Karnataka from the state of Maharashtra.

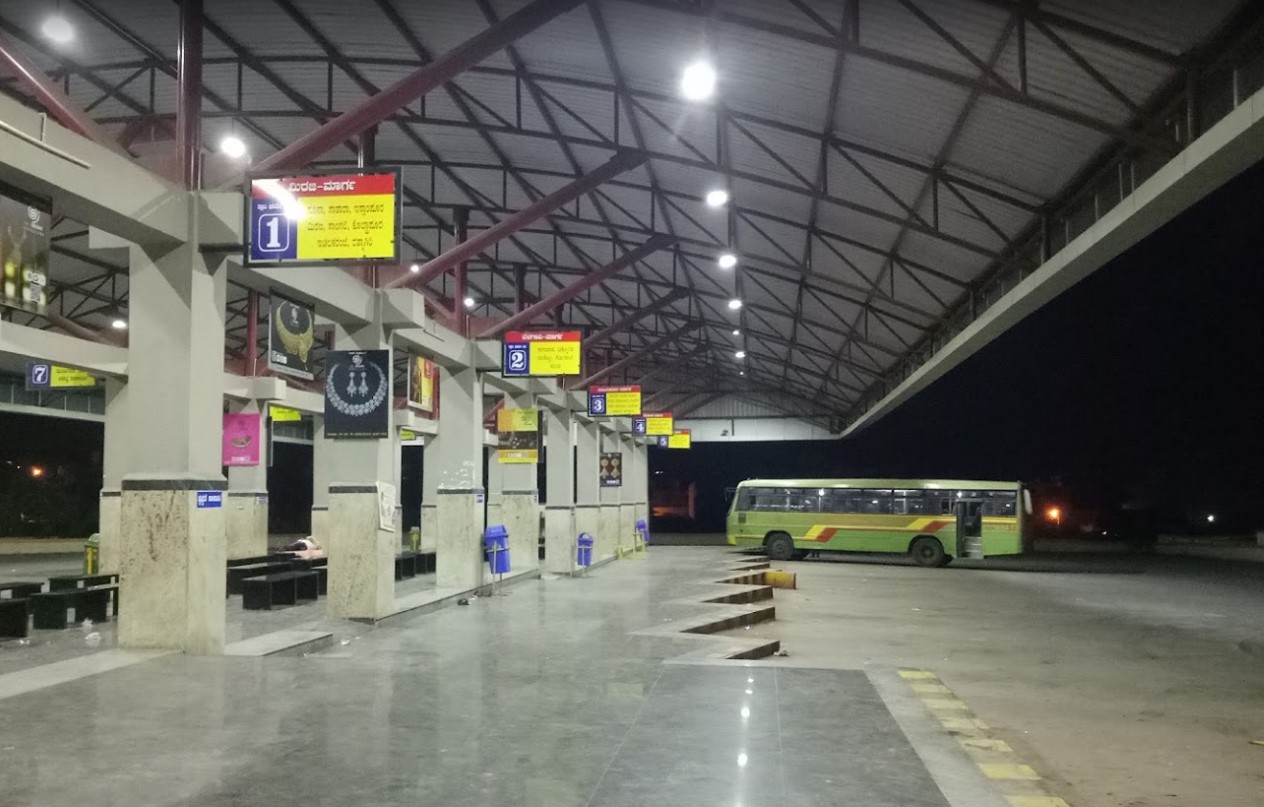
Athani bus terminal

== Transportation ==
Athani is well connected to various places like Hubballi, Vijayapura, Miraj, Sangli, Belagavi, Gokak, and Jamkhandi and the town has NWKRTC bus service. The nearest railway station is Ugar railway station which is 25 km from the city and Miraj junction 55 km from Athani. Belagavi and Kolhapur are the nearest airports. There are 24×7 buses for the cities Vijayapura and Belagavi.

There is a proposal for a new railway line between Shedbal-Athani-Vijayapura & shahbad to connect Vijayapura with Belagavi. A survey of this 112.3-km new railway line is completed and submitted to the Railways.

The city is well connected by roads. National Highway 548B connect from Sankeshwar-Athani-Vijayapura-akkalkot The three state highways pass through the city: SH-31 (Jath-Jambothi), and SH-72 (Nippani-muchanddi) and SH (khelgoan-jamakhandi)

Famous goods transportation (truck) company : Suhelroadlines

== Demographics ==
As of 2011 India census, Athani had a population of 63,625 according to the area 15 km^{2} including adjacent two villages in it . Males constitute 51% of the population and females 49%. Athani has an average literacy rate of 74%, higher than the national average, with 69% of the males and 79% of females literate. 14% of the population is under 6 years of age.

== Climate ==
Being situated in upper region of Belagavi district which lies in the elevated terrain of north-western Karnataka, Athani has a tropical climate. It is known for its moderately climate throughout the year. Athani receives rainfall from both the northeast and the southwest monsoons and the wettest months are June–September. It has a distinct normal climate in every season. extreme climate should not found here. June and August have a good deal of rainfall, while the winters have very little. The coldest month is December with an average low temperature of 25.3 °C and the hottest month is may with an average high temperature of 40 °C. Winter temperatures rarely drop up to 18 °C (54 °F), and summer temperatures seldom exceed 30–40 °C.The driest month is January, with 10 mm of rainfall.

Climate data for Athani, Karnataka
| Month | Jan | Feb | Mar | Apr | May | Jun | Jul | Aug | Sep | Oct | Nov | Dec | Year |
|---|---|---|---|---|---|---|---|---|---|---|---|---|---|
| Mean daily maximum °C (°F) | 30 (86) | 31 (88) | 33 (91) | 36 (97) | 39 (102) | 31 (88) | 32 (90) | 28 (82) | 30 (86) | 31 (88) | 30 (86) | 29 (84) | 39 (102) |
| Daily mean °C (°F) | 25 (77) | 26 (79) | 26.5 (79.7) | 30.5 (86.9) | 32.5 (90.5) | 28 (82) | 28.5 (83.3) | 26 (79) | 27 (81) | 26.5 (79.7) | 25 (77) | 23 (73) | 27 (81) |
| Mean daily minimum °C (°F) | 20 (68) | 21 (70) | 22 (72) | 25 (77) | 26 (79) | 25 (77) | 25 (77) | 24 (75) | 24 (75) | 22 (72) | 20 (68) | 19 (66) | 19 (66) |
| Average precipitation mm (inches) | 21 (0.8) | 01 (0.0) | 0 (0) | 21 (0.8) | 48.7 (1.92) | 580.3 (22.85) | 700 (27.6) | 500 (19.7) | 230 (9.1) | 80.6 (3.17) | 57 (2.2) | 65 (2.6) | 700 (27.6) |
| Mean monthly sunshine hours | 262.9 | 246.5 | 274.7 | 260.5 | 241.8 | 158.0 | 142.4 | 136.7 | 164.0 | 191.7 | 221.4 | 232.6 | 2,533.2 |
Source 1: Yearly weather forecasts
Source 2: Indian Meteorological Department

In 2024, Athani hobli received an annual rainfall of 618 millimetres (24.3 in).

== Culture ==
The ancient Amruthalingeshwara temple (500 years old) is located in the city.

Aigali animal husbandry fair is a notable event in the region. Athani has produced many well-known Kannada poets and writers. Kannada is the main language here while Marathi is also spoken, owing to close proximity with Maharashtra border.

== History ==
Historically, Athni was a fortified town where the armies of the Maratha Empire and the Mughal Empire clashed. In the present day, nothing remains of the fort but an ancient shrine of Siddeshwara continues to thrive. Siddeshwara Devastana is the largest temple of Athani town which attracts thousands of devotees. Athni was an important centre of trade. Its wheelwrights are known as excellent workmen; from the 15th to 19th centuries, its industries manufactured coarse cotton cloth, blankets, and saltpeter, and there were factories for pressing and cleaning cotton.

Ancient mentions of Athani taluk are Ramateerth has been connected with Ramayan. There are as many as five Ramateerths in the belagavi district, 1) in the Parasgad fort, 2) at Mullur in Ramdurg taluk, 3) near Kanbargi in Belgaum taluk, 4) at Ramateerth in Athani taluk. Ramtheerth having the oldest Shiva temple built during the Chalukyan period. Chalcolithic (copper age) sites have been located by Dr. Sundara in the upper Krishna valley that is Satti, Saptasagar. Pottery with paintings in ivory black, white kaolin, and brown are found at Satti is noteworthy. However the occurrence of the ash mounds in the Krishna valley of the Belgaum region, according to Sundara, seems to indicate the course of the defusion of this activity along the valley towards the Doab and it is probably associated with users of Sawalda pottery.

Athani has temples dedicated to Amritalingeshwar, Ramalinga, Siddeshwar built in later Chalukyas style shows the evidence of town during Chalukyas period The finest among them is the Amritalingeshwar temple of Later Chalukyan style with profuse carvings and highly artistic pillars in the navaranga. The entrance has pierced windows. The perspective of this beautiful building is lost due to encroachments around it, and the exterior of the Garbhagriha has sculptures the Nandi mandapa is across a modern road. The Siddheshwar temple on the Bijapur road is the grama devata and the domed temple is completely refurbished by the Adilshahis in Indo-Islamic style the remains of an earlier structure like Chalukyan pillars are built into the wall shows this temple is built during the Chalukyas period. The earliest of the Mathas is the Gachchina Matha founded in the 12th century. Within the premises of the Matha is the gadduge of the Shri Shivayogi Murugendra Swamiji the Matha is housed in a 400-year-old building. there are Motagi Matha and Gotkhindi Matha. The Rama Mandira at Athani was founded by saint Samartha Ramdas there is a passage leading to a secret chamber the place was a center of underground activities during the freedom movement. Athani has Nalbandh Mosque is of Ali Adil Shah's period.

Battle of Athani in 1690, a part of Mughal–Maratha Wars resulted in a decisive Maratha victory, in which Santaji Ghorpade defeated Kasim Khan, a Mughal general.

Many European travelers like French traveller Johan Albrecht de Mandelslo mentioned Athani in 1639, who notices Atteny city as one of the chief markets between Bijapur and Goa. It is the chief market in the District, sending cotton and grain westwards to Miraj, and receiving from the sea-coast through Miraj rice, coco-nuts, and dried fish. In about 1670 the English geographer John Ogilby mentioned Attany as a great trading town. In 1675, Fryer, the English traveler also notices Huttaney as a market town near Bijapur. In 1679, Athni was taken from Shivaji by the Mughul general Dilawar Khan who sacked it. Dilawar Khan wished to sell the people as slaves. Sambhaji, the son of Shivaji, who sometime before had rebelled against his father and joined Dilawar Khan, opposed the suggestion, and Dilawar Khan ignoring his remonstrances, left the camp and became reconciled with his father During this time, the English factory at Karwar had large dealings with Athani. In 1720, Athani was seized by the Nizam after made it over to his ally the Kolhapur chief, who in 1730, transferred it to the Maratha ruler Shahu I of Satara. In 1788, Rennell established an English factory. In 1792, Captain Moor calls it Athni, a large town well-populated and thriving and it was a place of much trade, importing merchandise from Surat, Bombay. Raichur and Narayanpeth in the Nizam's country during that time textile mills, leather mills, cotton ginning mills were established. Athni lapsed to the British Government in 1839 on the death of the Maratha chief. British established Subordinate Judge's court, a dispensary, a municipal middle school & a Town municipality in 1853. In 1918, Bal Gangadhar Tilak visited Athani during the freedom movement when he met the Sri Shivayogi Murugendra. Swamiji by the inspiration of tilak Jadavji education society was established and four other schools, one of which is for girls. even mahatma Gandhiji also visited Athani in 1935 Shri Shivayogi Murugendra Swamiji he is an inspiration for Lingaraj desai to establish KLE society in Karnataka in 1916. Athani unified with Karnataka state in 1956.

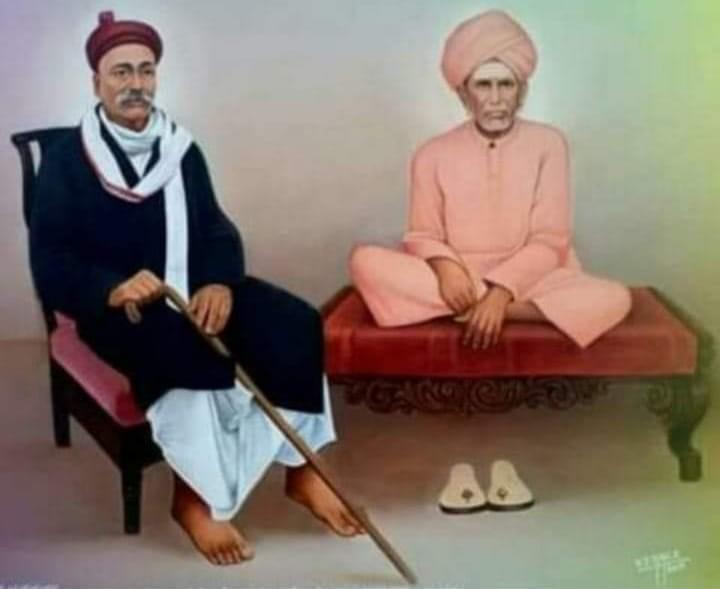
Bal-Gangadhar Tilak meets Athani Murugendra Shivayogi. during 1918

== Athani Taluk ==
Athani Taluk is the largest taluk in Belagavi district; it has a total area of 2070.54 km^{2}, 74% is cultivated. This includes 115 inhabited villages and hamlets with a rural population of 4,07,485 as per the 2011 census. The total population of the taluk is 5,25,832. The taluk is bounded by Sangli district of Maharashtra in the north, Vijayapura district in the east, and Krishna River in the south. It flows 110 km in the taluk. Geologically the area is covered by Deccan Trap formation. The average annual rainfall is 582 mm. The two rivers that flow here are Krishna and Agrani River. Agrani is beside the pandegao, shirur, ajur, sambargi, nagnur (p.a.), tawanshi, and kalloti.

The five largest towns of Athani Taluk (sorted in order of decreasing population) are Athani, Ugar, Ainapur, Kagawad, Shedbal. The river Krishna flows around the Athani taluk. Five sugar industries are in this taluk. They are located in Athani, Shinal, Kagawad, Kokatnur, Ugar and Kempwad . There are four Hobli in this taluk: Athani, Kagawad, Telsang and Anatapur. Most of the land is fully fertile; some of the land is dry and hilly.

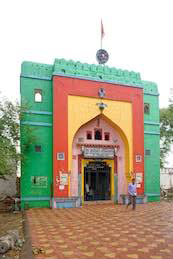
Siddeshwar temple athani

== Tourist attractions and pilgrimages ==
- Sri Dannamma Devi Temple Athani, a unique temple
- Ramatheerth: there is a temple of Lord Rameshwar of the old stone temple of 800 years old and one of the caves is located behind the temple it is built during Chalukyas period.
- Athani Amrutlingeshwar temple is built in the Chalukyaan period 1000 years old.
- Gachhina math is a place of lord Murugendra Shivayogi and Marulashankar Devaru in Athani.
- A Raghavendra Swamiji Math was built by the late Shri Bhimdas. This place is also known as Abhinav Mantralaya.
- Savadi Venu Gopal Temple (also known as Gopalkrishna Temple) situated on the bank of Krishna River at Savadi is perhaps the oldest temple in Athani Taluka. the temple Venu Gopal is the presiding deity. It is a typical Trikuteshwar type temple where apart from the presiding deity, the other two vigrahas on either side of the main sanctum sanctorum are two impressive Shivlings. According to the archeological study, the temple is about 1000–1200 years old
- Athani Siddeshwara Temple has the architecture of a mosque. Built-in stone, it was recently clad with marble. It is the main deity of Athani town. It is said that Adilshah of Vijayapura was constructed sometime in the 15th or 16th century.
- Khidrapur ancient temple
- Nandagaon ancient temple
- Ancient fort anatapur
- Hipparagi barrage
- Khilegavi (Basaveshwar Temple situated in Khiilegavi)
- Kokatanur (Yellamma temple)
- Avarkhod: Hanuman temple, is a tourist place. It is the oldest temple.

== Agriculture ==
In Athani agriculture is the main occupation. About 60% of the total population is engaged in agriculture. The main crops are: jawar, wheat, sunflower, toordal, and kushbi. The commercial crops are sugarcane, grapes, wheat and ground nut. Few varietiesof vegetables like tomatoes, brinjals, ladies fingers, green leaves and redchillies are also grown With the limited rainfall, diesel power pumpsets are in vogue for the available water supply. And the main commercial crop is sugarcane. Athani is one of the largest sugarcane cultivation taluks in Karnataka. 70% of the land is fertile. Sugarcane is cultivated near river Krishna and river Agrani. It is cultivated more than 1,50,000 acres in taluk. Irrigation facilities of Hipparagi barrage of Upper Krishna Projectis in athani. By this project canals were constructed. It is very helpful for cultivation of sugarcane and grapes. The Hipparagi project is useful to farmers. Most of farmers cultivate sugarcane and jawar.

== Industries ==
There are many industries located in Athani taluk like the sugar industry, chappal factories, glucose, and mills.

=== Leather Chappal Mills ===
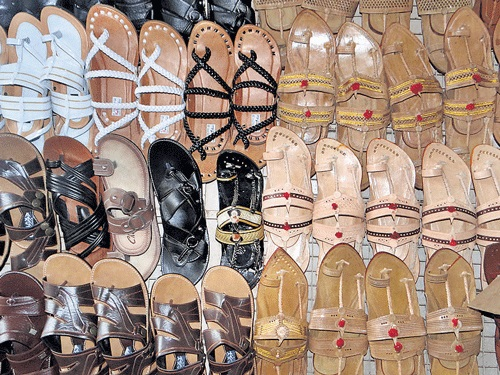
Athani leather chappals

The Athani is famous for leather chappals scheduled caste families forming a considerable chunk of the local population. This serves a special mention because of the valid contribution of few subgroups to the now-famous leather products of Athani. The sub-groups are Dhors and Samagars who are mostly engaged in this leather trade and are traditional leather workers. Dhors are specialized in the tanning of hides and skins, while Samagars have proved as intricate craftsmen to produce leather footwear. Recognizing this, the Khadi and village industries commission established a footwear manufacturing center under the name "Lidkar". The success of this paved the way towards another milestone, where ‘Lidkar’ backed by the State Government, saw the light of the day, boosting the activity of footwear manufacturing further. The foot-wears are marketed throughout India by the respective outlets. The traders from another part of the country also procure leather goods from Athani, to market them in their areas. Through the State Trading Corporation, these leather goods are also exported to many countries where they have found a sizeable market. Athanic Footwear The category which has established itself by way of its design and quality is known as ‘Kolhapuri Chappals’ which has a great demand in local as well as the export markets. These goods were exported to foreign countries like Scotland, Netherlands, England, and others.

== Sugar industry ==
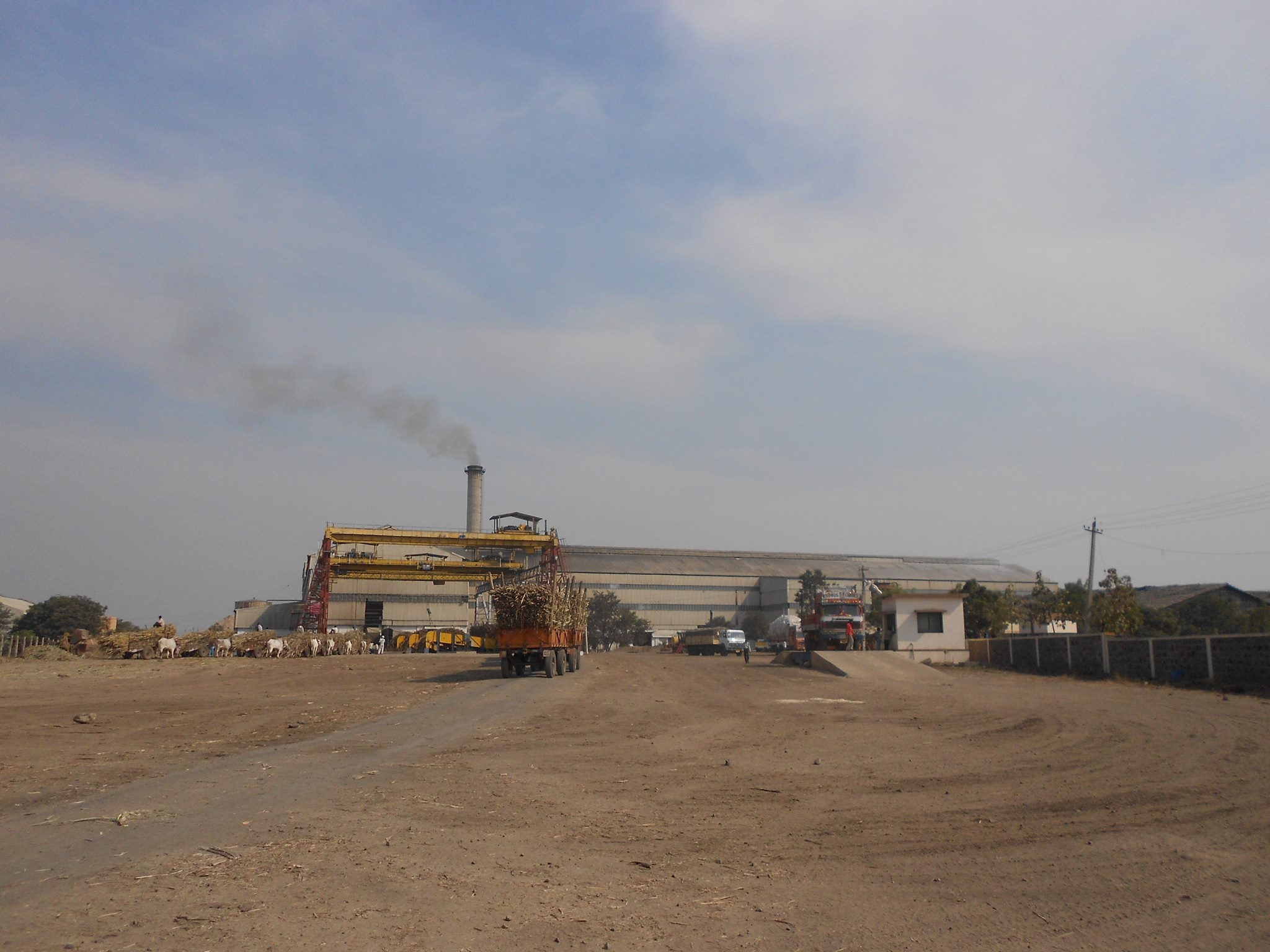
Krishna cooperative sugar industry, Athani

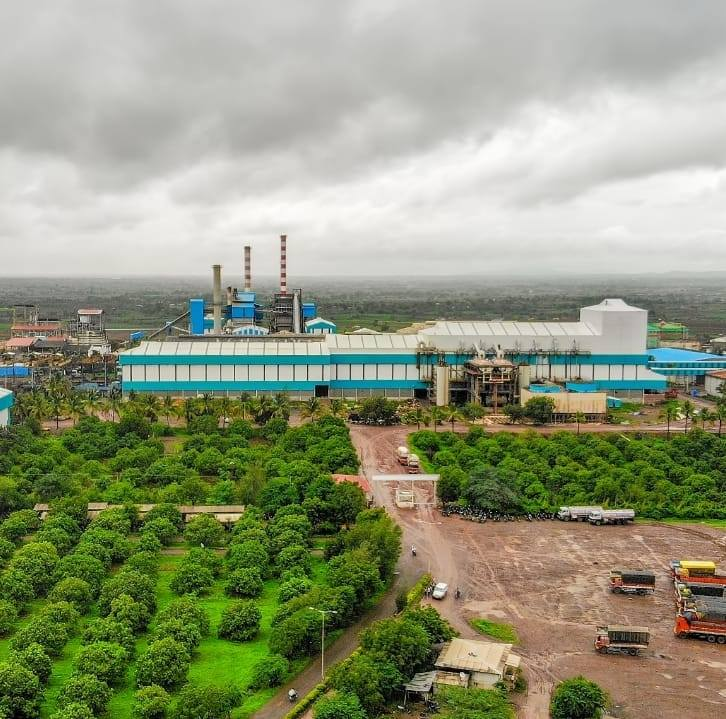
Athani farmers sugar industry

Previously there was no sugar industry was there in this taluk but farmers transported the sugarcane to Maharashtra. in 1940 the sugar industry establish in ugar Athani Taluk Ugar sugars Pvt ltd, it produces more than 12,000 tonnes. Athani taluk is the largest sugarcane crushing & sugar-producing in Karnataka. it ranks number 1 in Karnataka and in 1985 Krishna co-operative sugar industry, Athani many sugar industries were started in this taluk. Presently 5 sugar industries are located in Athani taluk there are:

- Krishna co-operative sugar industry, Athani
- Ugar sugars pvt ltd, Ugar
- Shree Renuka sugars pvt ltd, Kokatnur
- Athani farmers sugar industry, Kempwad
- Shiraguppi sugars pvt ltd, Kagwad

== See also ==
- Athani Taluk
- Athani (rural)
- Belagavi district
