= Bijapur Fort =

Fort in Bijapur, India

- Part of Bijapur
- Bijapur, India
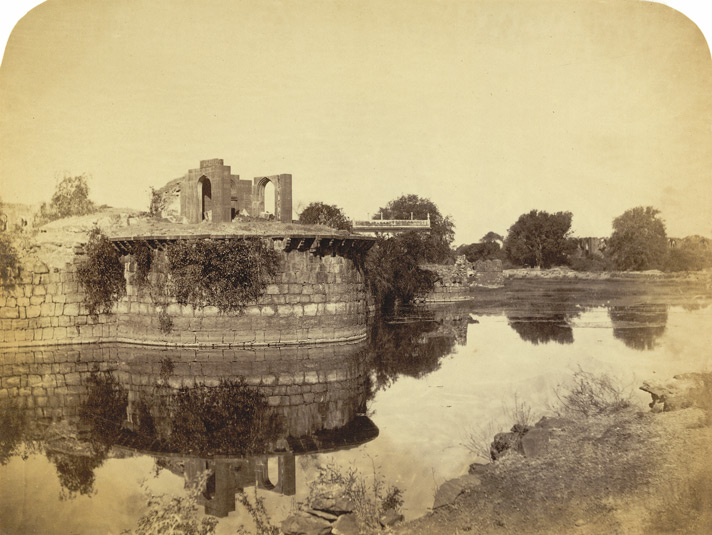
- View of Bijapur Fort from the moat

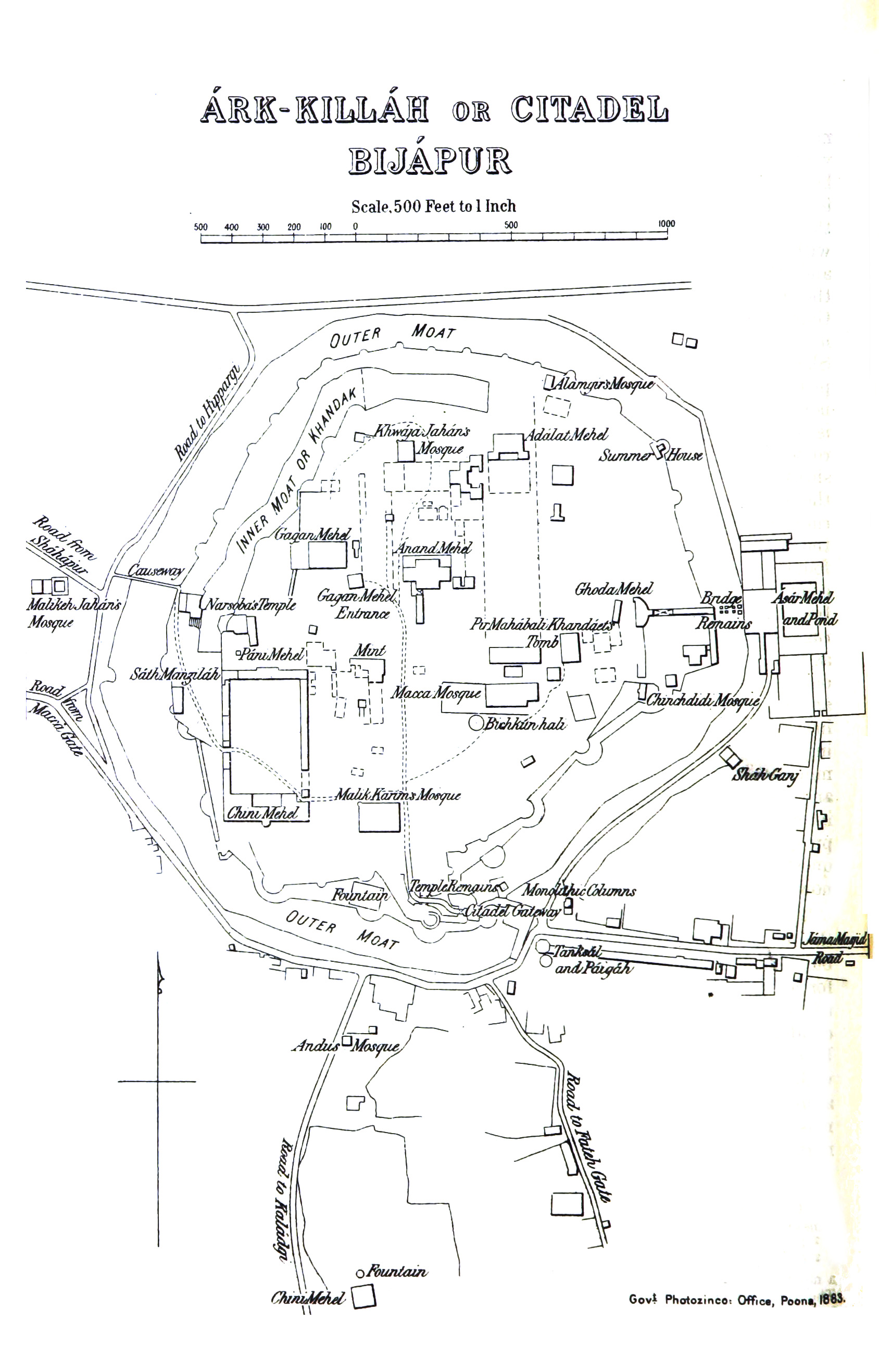
- Layout Plan of Bijapur Fort

Site information
- Type: Fort
- Controlled by: Government of Karnataka
- Open to the public: Yes
- Condition: Ruins

Location
- Location within Karnataka
- Coordinates: 16.8276°N 75.7087°E

Site history
- Built: 16th century
- Built by: Yusuf Adil Shah in 1566
- Materials: Granites and lime mortar

The Bijapur Fort (Vijapur kote) is located in the Bijapur city in Bijapur District of the Indian state of Karnataka. Bijapur fort has a plethora of historical monuments of architectural importance built during the rule of Adil Shahi dynasty.

The Adil Shahi Sultans who ruled for nearly 200 years in Bijapur had expended their utmost authority, almost exclusively, on architecture and the allied arts, each Sultan endeavored to excel his predecessor in the number, size, or splendor of his building projects. As a result, the buildings seen in and around Bijapur Fort and the town have been rightly called as the Agra of South India.

== History ==
The rich history of the fort, the citadel, and other structures is subsumed in the history of Bijapur city, which was established in the 10th–11th centuries by the Kalyani Chalukyas. It was then known as Vijayapura (city of victory). The city came under the influence of the Khalji Sultanate in Delhi by the late 13th century. In 1347, the area was conquered by the Bahmani Sultanate of Gulbarga. By this time, the city was being referred as Vijapur or Bijapur.

Yusuf Adil Shah, son of Murad II, the Sultan of Turkey had joined the Bidar court of the sultanate in 1481 under the then Sultan Mohammed III. He had been purchased as slave by Mahmud Gavan, the prime minister of the kingdom. He was later, in 1481, appointed as the Governor of Bijapur for his loyalty and bravery shown in the active defense of the sultanate. The fort and the citadel or Arkilla and the Faroukh Mahal were built by him with the skilled architects and artisans whom he had inducted into his employment from Persia, Turkey and Rome. Yusuf declared himself independent of Sultan’s rule and thus established the Adil Shahi dynasty or the Bahmani kingdom, in 1489 (in 1482, the Bahmini empire broke into five kingdoms and Bijapur sultanate was one of them).

Ibrahim Adil Shah, son of Yusuf Adil Shah by his Hindu wife Punji (daughter of a Maratha warrior), succeeded his father who died in 1510. Since he was a minor at the time of his father's death, there was an attempt to grab the throne, which was effectively thwarted by the timely intervention of his valiant mother fighting for her son's cause in male attire. He then became the ruler of Bijapur Sultanate. He was instrumental in making further additions to the fort and also building the Jami Masjid within the fort.

Ibrahim Adil Shah’s successor Ali Adil Shah I forged an alliance with other Muslim rulers of the Deccan (other Shahi kingdoms of (Ahmednagar and Bidar). Ali built several structures in the fort and the city suburbs, such as the Gagan Mahal, Ali Rauza (his own tomb), Chand Bawdi (a large well) and the Jami Masjid.

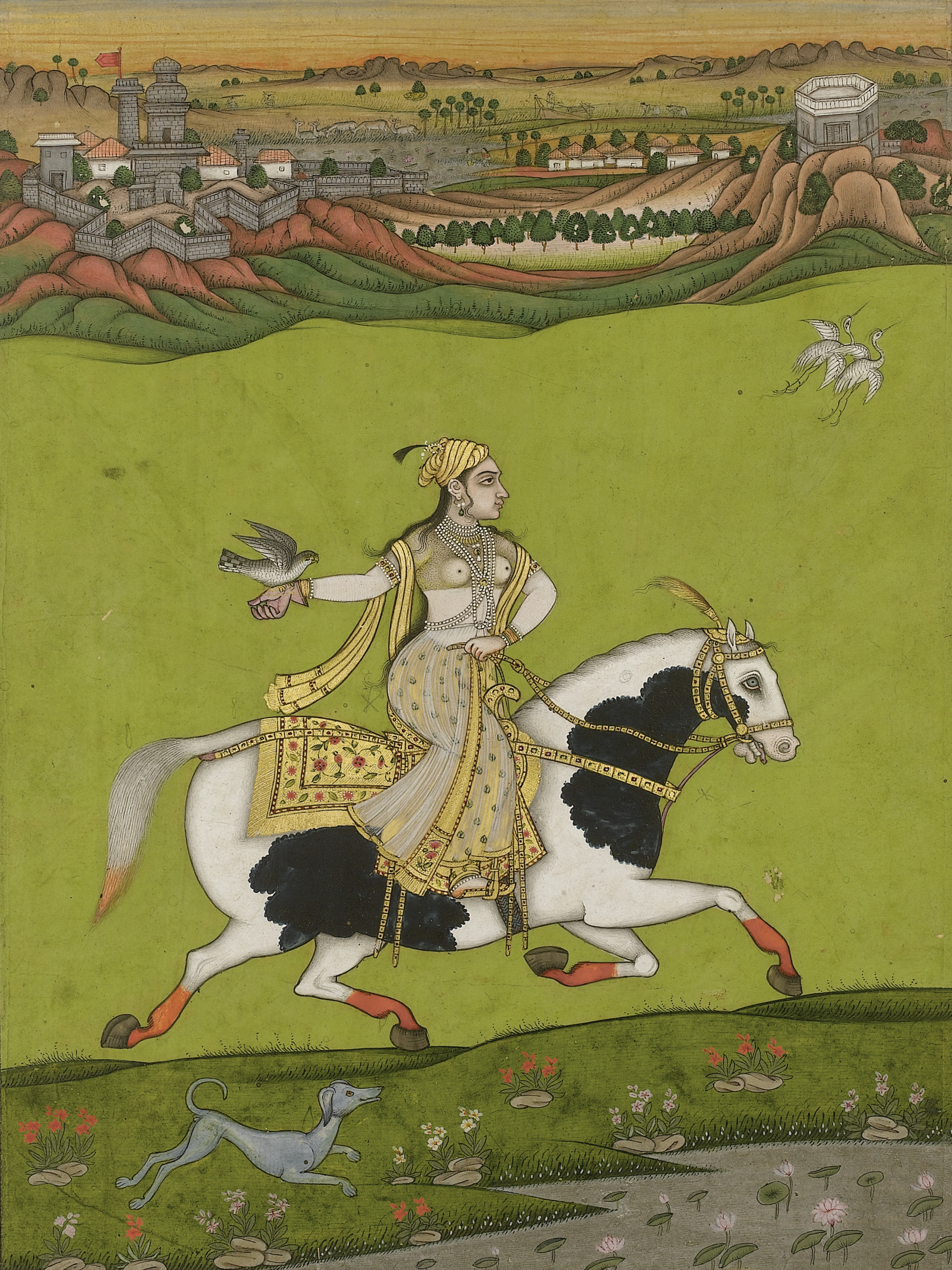
Chand Bibi, the regent of Bijapur

Since Ali did not have a son of his own, his nephew Ibrahim II was crowned the king. But he was also a minor when he was crowned and his mother Chand Bibi effectively protected him, acting as the regent of Bijapur. Ibrahim, the fifth king of the dynasty of Bahmanis, was a tolerant and an intellectual king who forged good relationship between Hindus and Muslims and also between Shia and Sunni Muslims in his kingdom and ushered harmony among the people of his kingdom; history has therefore titled him with the name of "Jagadguru Badshah". He ruled for 46 years. He also built Hindu temples within his palace precincts and composed verses dedicated to Saraswati (Hindu goddess of learning) and Ganapati, the Hindu god of wisdom. He was also a great patron of music and learning. He built the world-famous Gol Gumbaz (the second biggest dome in the world with whispering galleries). During his reign, the historic Mallik-E-Maidan, the gun position, was erected in the fort precincts. The gun is a massive arsenal of 4.45 metres (14.6 ft) length, which is seen even now at the same location in a good condition.

In the last decade of Adil Shah’s power, when he fell sick, his wife Bariba is said to have ruled. After he died in 1646, his adopted son Ali Adil Shah II came to power but there were internal struggles for the reins of power. The dynasty's control thus weakened. Bijapur was greatly weakened after the defeat of Afzal Khan and his 10,000 man Bijapur forces by the Maratha ruler Shivaji Maharaj, who had attacked Bijapur repeatedly and plundered it but later agreed to an armistice to consolidate his forces to capture Karnataka. But after Shivaji Maharaj died, the Mughal led by Aurangzeb finally annexed the kingdom after the Siege of Bijapur in the year 1686 that eventually ended with the death of Sikandar Adil Shah the last of the Adil Shahi's. With this defeat, the 200-year rule of Adil Shahi dynasty ended and Bijapur sultanate was incorporated into the Mughal Empire, in 1686. During this period, Adil Shah had started building his mausoleum, called the Bara Kaman, but he died before he could complete it.

Two centuries later, in 1877, during the British rule, due to scarcity (famine conditions) Bijapur city was found in a desolate and deserted state that was compared to similarly placed ruined cities of Baalbek in Bekaa Valley of Lebanon or Pompeiopolis in Rome. The palaces and tombs in the fort were in ruins. Bijapur was like the city of the dead, for there was no water or food in the city.

== Structures ==
The fort precinct is studded with the historical fort, palaces, mosques, tombs and gardens built by the Adil Shahis with their deep interest in architecture (in Persian, Ottoman Turkish and the allied arts. Some ruins of ancient temples, predating the Adilshahi period, are also seen. The most striking structures, in the order of their importance, are the Citadel or Arkilla, the Jamia Masjid (or Jumma masjid), the Gagan Mahal palace, the tomb of Ali Rauza or Ibrahim Roza (tomb of Ibrahim Adil Shah I), Chand Bawdi or Taj Bavdi (a large well), Mahatar Mahal (Dilkusha Mahal), Malikah-e-Jahan Mosque, Jal Mahal, and also an innocuous well in the vicinity of the fort with a legend of a tragedy linked to a brave but jealous general of the dynasty. It is said that the Adilshahis, during their reign of 200 years, built over 50 mosques, 20 tombs and 20 palaces. Bijapur has, therefore, been called as Agra of South India.

Apart from these monuments, Ibrahim II also built the Dattatreya Temple, to the west of the citadel. It contains a pair of paduka (foot sandals) of saint Narasimha Saraswati.

=== Fort ===
The fort and the citadel within it were completed by Yusuf Adil Shah in 1566. They were built in two concentric circles. The citadel at the centre of the two concentric circles has a circumferential length of 400 metres (1,300 ft). The east–west axis of the fort measures 3 kilometres (1.9 mi). The circumferential length of the fort’s outer wall, which encloses the old city, measures 10 kilometres (6.2 mi). It is strongly fortified with the most massive materials with ninety-six large bastions of various designs. The bastions are decorated with "crenellations and interspersed with machicolations". In addition, there are ten other bastions at the five main gateways (which are arched and decorated entrances) to the fort. It is surrounded by a moat of 30 feet (9.1 m) to 40 feet (12 m) width (assessed depth of 10 feet (3.0 m), but is presently silted up that even obscures its presence and hence its depth cannot be correctly stated). The fort wall has varying height, about 50 feet (15 m) high. The width is about 25 feet (7.6 m); from bastion to bastion runs a battlemented curtained wall about 10 ft (3.0 m) high.

The five gateways in the fort are the Makka gate on the west, the Shahapur gate at the north-west corner, the Bahmani gate on the north, the Allahpur gate on the east, and the Fateh gate on the south-east.

In the days when Bijapur Sultanate commanded almost the whole of the Deccan territory, the strongly fortified fort had more than 1000 canons made of brass and iron. The palace inside was encompassed by two moats. As also reported, in the mid 16th century, the palace was guarded by 2000 men and the city had a garrison of 5000 men headed by Nammouth Chan, an Italian.

=== Jamia masjid ===
Jamia Masjid
View of the Jami Masjid from the south-east	The Quran, written in gold at Jumma Masjid’s mehrab

Jamia Masjid located in the southeast part of the city, the largest mosque of Bijapur, was started in 1565, but not fully completed. It has an arcaded prayer hall with fine aisles supported on massive piers and has an impressive dome in the façade which has nine bays. The large courtyard also has a water tank. It is called the Jami Masjid or Jumma Masjid as Qutba is read here every Friday. The masjid spreads over an area of 10,810 square metres (116,400 ft^{2}). The mosque building is in a rectangular shape of size 170 metres (560 ft) x 70 metres (230 ft). The façade depicts nine large arches with five inner arches enclosing 45 compartments; the building is incomplete as two minarets are missing or not built. The dome is semicircular in shape. In 1636, the arched shaped mehrab in the mosque was gilded and inscribed with Persian verses, at the instance of Muhammad Adil Shah. Another interesting feature is the 2250 inlaid rectangular tiles in the form of prayer rugs seen in the prayer hall. The tiles were laid at the orders of the Mughal emperor Aurangzeb. Aurangzeb also got the mosque extended with an eastern gate and verandahs to the east, the south and the north.

=== Mehtar Mahal ===
Mehtar Mahal
Mehtar Mahal	Doorway of the Mehtar Mahal

Though modestly sized, Mehtar Mahal dated to 1620 is one of the most elegant structures in the fort; the entry gate in particular has been built in Indo-Islamic architecture style. The façade has three arches, which depict exquisite "cornice supported on carved corbels". A gateway leads to the Mehtar mosque, which is a three-storey building. It has two slender minarets that are covered with delicately carved birds and rows of swans. The carvings are in Hindu architectural style, in the form of brackets supporting the balconies and stone trellis work. The building has a flat roof and minarets have rounded top.

Barakaman

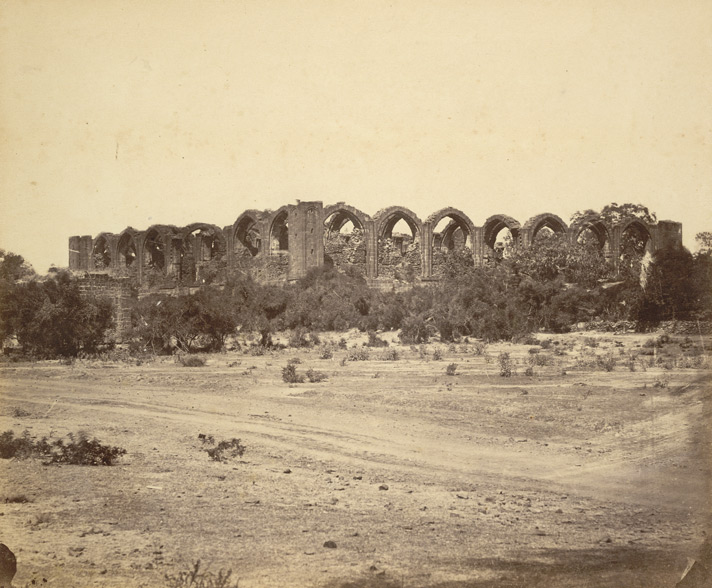
Barakaman- unfinished tomb of Ali Adil Shah

Barakaman (meaning 12 arches) is a mausoleum of Ali Roza built in 1672. It is located to the north of the citadel and the Gagan Mahal, in the midst of a public garden. It was initially called as Ali Roza, but Shah Nawab Khan changed its name to Bara Kaman, as this was the 12th monument built during his reign and was planned with 12 arches. It is a 215-foot (66 m) square building built on a raised platform. It has now seven arches built of brown basaltic stone, in Gothic style. The tomb is in an inner raised enclosure, which contains the graves of Ali, queens and eleven other ladies, possibly belonging to the Zenana of the queens.

=== Malik-e-Maidan ===
The Malik-i-Maidan, the Gun position
View of the Malik-i-Maidan gun position in 1865	The Malik-i-Maidan is stated to be the largest piece of cast bronze ordnance in the world

The Malik-i-Maidan (Master of the Battlefield), also called Burj-E-Sherz, was erected by Ibrahim Adil Shah II. It was named after the Battle of Talikota of 1565 in which the Vijayanagara Empire was routed. It is now located in the fort on its western ramparts between two bastions. It has a large cannon, 4.45 metres (14.6 ft) long and 1.5 metres (4.9 ft) in diameter with a 700 millimetres (28 in) bore. The cannon weighs 55 tonnes and is considered one of the largest medieval guns made. The unusual feature of the gun is that its muzzle is shaped in the form of a lion head with carved open jaws as if devouring an elephant (depicted between the jaws). The gun is cool when touched even during the hot summer season and when tapped gives soft resonating sound. It is said that touching it brings good luck. From the inscriptions on the gun position, it is deduced that the gun was cast in 1549 at Ahmadnagar from bell metal by Muhammad Bin Husain Rumi. Another inscription records that Aurangzeb conquered Bijapur in 1685-86. It is also said that the large weight of the canon discouraged the British from carrying it as a trophy to England.

=== Landa Kasab ===
The Landa Kasab is a large iron cannon placed within a bastion along the southern wall of fortress "some distance to the west of the Fateh gate" and slightly to the east of the modern-day Bagalkot Road. The cannon measures 6.57 metres (21 ft 7 in) long, with a diameter of 1.32 metres (4 ft 4 in) at the breech and 1.34 metres (4 ft 5 in) at the muzzle, and is estimated to weigh nearly 47 long tons (48,000 kg). The cannon has a caliber of 495.3 millimetres (1 ft 7.50 in), and a length of bore of 5.67 metres (18 ft 7 in).

=== Gagan Mahal ===
Gagan Mahal or Heavenly Palace
View of the Gagan Mahal and the Sat Manzili from the moat	Another view of Gagan Mahal

Gagan Mahal or Heavenly Palace was built by Ali Adil Shah I in 1561 as a royal palace with a durbar hall. It has three impressive arches and the central arch is the widest. The durbar hall was located in the ground floor while the first floor was built as the private residence of the royal family. But both floors are now in ruins. The façade of the palace has three arches; the central arch, which is the largest of the three, is 20 metres (66 ft) long and 17 metres (56 ft) high.

=== Sat Manzili ===
Sat Manzili was originally a seven-storeyed palace but now only five floors exist. It is conjectured that it was a pleasure pavilion built in 1583 during the reign of Ibrahim II Adil Shah. An engraving of a painting of this building by W Turner can be seen in The Palace of Seven Stories. with a poetical illustration by Letitia Elizabeth Landon and, as she writes 'No steps are heard in the ruined hall. Such is man's pride, and such is its fall.' In a note, she records a traditional reason for the construction of such an elevated structure.

== Asar Mahal ==
Asar Mahal or Dad Mahal or Asar-i-Sharaf
View of Asar Mahal from the reservoir	Fine verandah, roof supported by four wooden pillars and reservoir

Asar Mahal or palace was constructed in 1646 by the Adil Shahis. It is located to the east of the citadel. A bridge connects it and it is well preserved. It is also known as Dad Mahal since it was initially used as hall of justice. It was later converted as reliquary and has become a highly revered place since it is said to hold two hairs from the beard of Muhammad. The portico has impressive wooden columns (four numbers of octagonal shape) and is double the normal height and has wooden panelled ceiling. It faces an artificial lake. The walls and ceiling of the hall display landscape paintings. Women are prohibited from entering this Mahal. A picture of Assar Mahal, Beejapore by Thomas Boys was published in Fisher's Drawing Room Scrap Book, 1833 along with a poetical illustration by Letitia Elizabeth Landon (wrongly described as Ruins near Agra).

=== Taj Bawdi ===
Taj Bawdi is a water reservoir that was built to commemorate Taj Sultana, Ibrahim II ’s first wife. The entrance arch is very impressive and has two octagonal towers; the east & west wings of the two towers were used as rest houses.
