= Siege of Bijapur =

1685–1686 siege in India

- Part of the Mughal–Bijapur Wars
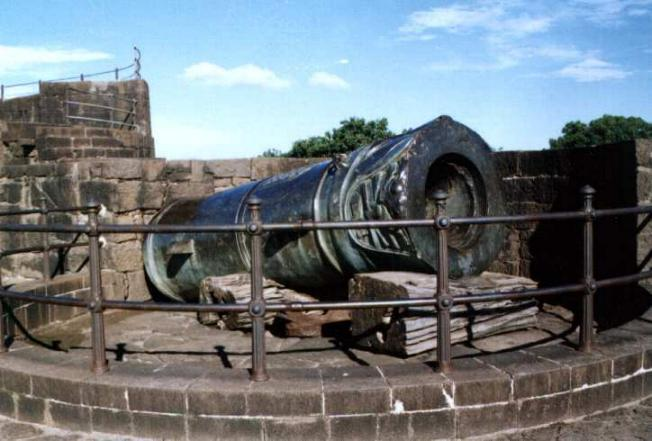
- The "Malik-i-Maidan", a notable bronze cannon at Bijapur Fort; Mughal emperor Aurangzeb had his name inscribed on this after the victorious siege
Date	1 April 1685 – 12 September 1686
Location	Bijapur Fort (now in Bijapur, Karnataka, India)
Result	Mughal victory
Territorial changes	Mughal Empire annexes the Sultanate of Bijapur

Commanders and leaders
Aurangzeb; Azam Shah; Ghazi ud-Din Khan Feroze Jung I	Sikandar Adil Shah; Pam Naik

Strength
80,000	30,000

The siege of Bijapur (1 April 1685 - 12 September 1686) was a military conflict between the Mughal Empire and the Bijapur Sultanate, over the latter's fortified capital city of Bijapur (in modern day Karnataka, India). It was the culmination of previous Mughal attempts to invade the Sultanate earlier that century, and took place during the reigns of Mughal emperor Aurangzeb and sultan Sikandar Adil Shah. Lasting 15 months, the siege was initially carried out by Mughal officers such as prince Azam Shah and Ghaziuddin Khan Feroze Jung, before Aurangzeb arrived in Bijapur midway to conduct the siege personally. The conflict ended in Mughal victory, resulting in the imprisonment of Sikandar Adil Shah and incorporation of the Bijapur Sultanate as a Mughal province.

== Background ==
=== Political landscape ===
During the reign of the fifth Mughal emperor Shah Jahan, the Mughals had managed to stabilise the empire's southern frontier in the Deccan region. The Ahmadnagar Sultanate was extinguished around 1633, and Shah Jahan negotiated tributary relationships with the last two independent polities of the Deccan, the Bijapur and Golconda Sultanates, by 1636. Aurangzeb had long supported annexing the sultanates outright, and in 1656 while he served as the Mughal viceroy of the Deccan, found the pretext to do so when Bijapur sultan Muhammad Adil Shah died, succeeded by the eighteen-year-old Ali Adil Shah II. With his father's order, Aurangzeb invaded the Bijapur Sultanate's frontier and captured several key territories such as Bidar, but soon after Shah Jahan changed his mind and the offensive was concluded with peace treaties. The tributary relationship between the Mughals and the Deccan Sultanates would be maintained for thirty years after Aurangzeb's accession to the throne.

After Aurangzeb's accession, the Deccan saw the rise of Maratha chieftain Shivaji, who raided both Bijapuri and Mughal holdings in the Deccan. Aurangzeb appointed Jai Singh I in March 1665 to put down this threat and then annex Bijapur. In June of the same year, Shivaji capitulated under the Treaty of Purandhar, becoming a Mughal vassal. In November, Jai Singh launched an invasion of the Bijapur Sultanate, which Shivaji took part in. The invasion was ultimately unsuccessful; Jai Singh's army was forced to halt 6 kos from the Bijapur fort, because the defendants employed a scorched-earth policy as they withdrew to the fort.

The 1670s saw the Bijapur Sultanate's central administration deteriorate significantly. Ali Adil Shah II died and was succeeded by his young son Sikandar Adil Shah in 1672. This triggered severe factionalism in the Bijapuri court between Afghani and Deccani nobles. Moreover, by this time Shivaji had seceded from Mughal service and established a powerful independent polity that served as an attractive alternative for officials of the Sultanate. The political stability from Shah Jahan's rule in the Deccan was hence eroding. In 1682, emperor Aurangzeb himself arrived in the Deccan to counter the rebellion of his son, prince Muhammad Akbar. After this threat was neutralised, Aurangzeb turned his attention to annexing Bijapur, believing conquest of the Deccan sultanates to be the lasting solution to the political instability in the region.

=== Bijapur ===
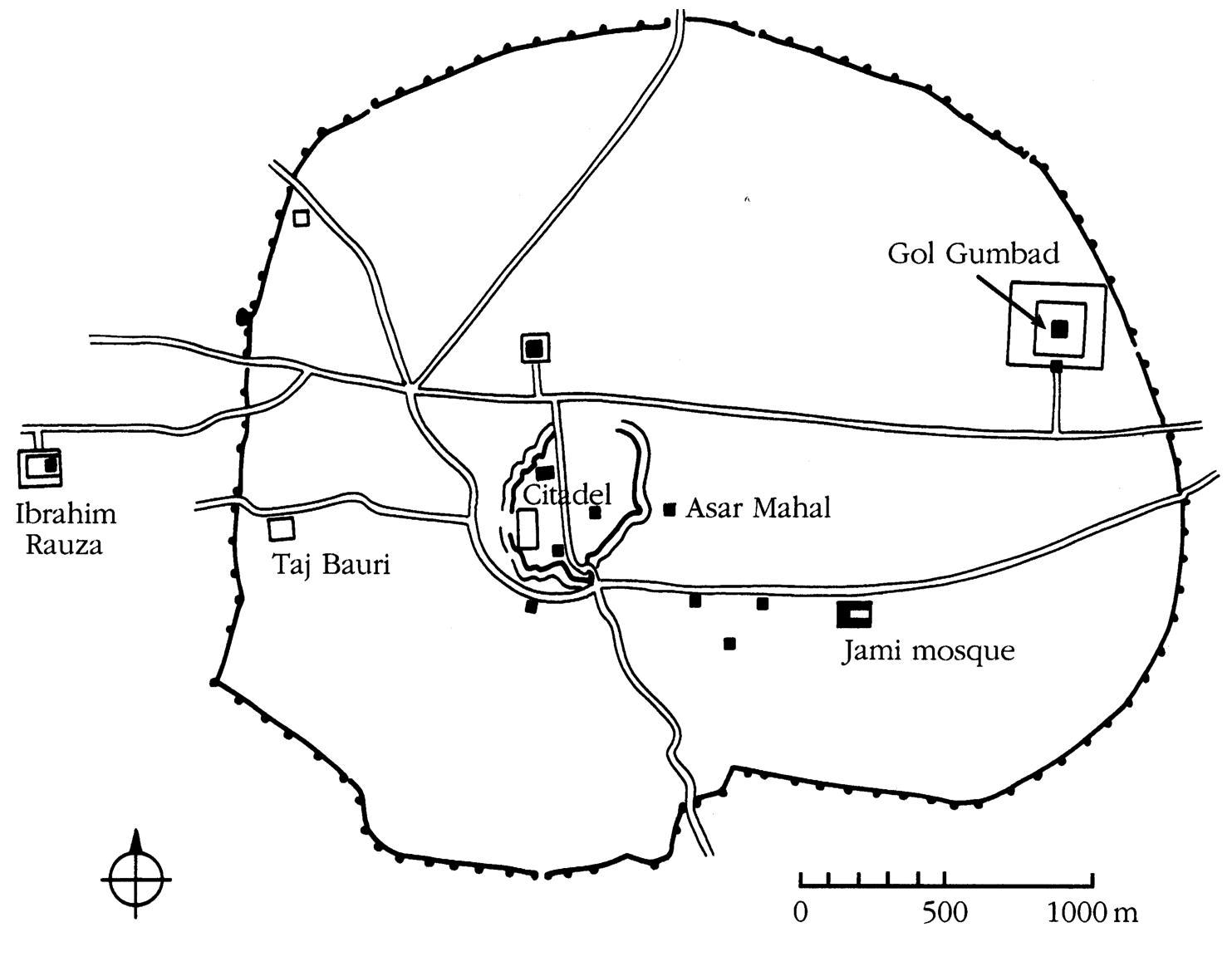
Schematic map of Bijapur Fort

In the era of Aurangzeb's siege, the Bijapur Fort was known as Killa Ark, and had a circumference of one mile, containing the residence of the king and nobility. It consisted of a triple line of concentric fortifications, and was surrounded by a moat and a double wall beyond that. A deep moat surrounded these walls as well. The outermost of these walls had a circumference of two and a half miles, followed by another wall fifty feet high. This wall had over 100 bastions, and behind it was a stone curtain punctuated by cannons and guns. Three notable bastions were the Sharji Burj, the Landa Kasab Burj, and the Ferangi Burj. Atop the Sharji Burj was the Malik-i-Maidan (lit. 'Lord of the plain'), a large and notable bronze cannon built by a Turkish engineer in the 16th century and weighing 55 tons.The Landa Kasab Burj, constructed in 1662, lay on the southern side of the walls and bore Bijapur's largest cannon. The Ferangi Burj was constructed in 1676 by a Portuguese captain.

== Siege ==
In 1684, while Aurangzeb was engaged in skirmishes with Marathas, he sent letters to Sikandar Adil Shah asking for safe passage and cooperation in his territories. However, the sultan refused, prompting Aurangzeb to send an army commanded by prince Azam Shah. Sikandar Adil Shah commanded a garrison of 30,000 troops, and had received a Maratha contingent in support of the defense of the fort. Mughal forces at the siege of Bijapur numbered 80000. The siege army encamped outside Bijapur on 1 April 1685, opening the siege by beginning to dig trenches. Aurangzeb moved the imperial camp from Ahmednagar to Sholapur on the 24th of May, and the road from Sholapur to Bijapur served as the supply line for the siege army.

From the outset, Bijapuri forces continuously attacked the Mughal infantry manning the trenches. This caused a powder magazine in Azam Shah's force to ignite resulting in the death of 500 troops. The Mughals stationed outposts in the hinterland of Bijapur Fort to prevent supplies reaching the citadel's garrison. Eventually the Bijapuri forces succeeded in cutting Azam's army off from supplies, leaving them trapped and approaching starvation. Aurangzeb deputed Ghaziuddin Khan Feroze Jung to Azam's aid, with a large force and supplies. Horses were purchased from mansabdars at the imperial court to reinforce Azam's cavalry. Ghaziuddin Khan set out from Ahmadnagar and rescued Azam's force, earning him the Mahi Maratib, the highest honour the Mughal emperor could bestow. Stationed at Rasulpur, Ghaziuddin Khan also landed a major success by defeating a 6000-strong force led by Pam Naik attempting to supply the Bijapur garrison. In 1685, the Mughals intercepted a letter from Golconda sultan Abul Hasan Qutb Shah stating his intention to support Bijapur by sending an army of 4000. On 28th June Aurangzeb deputed prince Shah Alam who invaded the kingdom successfully, keeping aid at bay. In late 1685 the Mughal infantry was able to thwart Bijapuri attempts to create batteries against them.

Aurangzeb decided to personally conduct the siege after several months of slow progress and left Sholapur on 14th June 1686, arriving in a suburb of Bijapur named Rasulpur on 3rd July. On the 4th of July, he ordered the advance of the Mughal trench lines so that the fort's towers could be destroyed using artillery. He succeeded in demolishing a large part of the fort's Ferangi Burj. He also ordered the moat of the fort to be filled with earth. Mughal trench lines reached upto the fort walls in September. The Mughals were never able to cross the moat, but by this point the fort's inhabitants were scarce of food. On 9 September 1686, an Adil Shahi delegation arrived at the Mughal encampment and conveyed the Bijapuris' decision to surrender. On 12 September, Sikandar Adil Shah left the citadel and presented himself at the royal camp, handing over the citadel's keys.

== Aftermath ==
Fateh Darwaza through which Aurangzeb entered Bijapur Fort

On 19 September, Aurangzeb entered Bijapur through the fort's Mangli Darwaza, the gateway spanning the bastions Landa Kasab Burj and Ferangi Burj. The gate was subsequently named Fateh Darwaza. He had his name inscribed on the fort's Malik-i-Maidan cannon, and erased paintings from the walls of the royal palace that he considered un-Islamic. Several mansabdars who had served in the Mughal conquest had their imperial rank raised; Ghaziuddin Khan was given credit for the fort's capture and had his rank raised to 7000. Most Bijapuri nobles were inducted into the Mughal service as mansabdars; leading Bijapuri nobles Sharza Khan and Abdul Rauf Khan were awarded a rank for their role in negotiations, and entitled Rustam Khan and Dilir Khan respectively. The former Sultanate of Bijapur became a Mughal province, staffed with a Mughal administration, and the capital city of Bijapur was renamed Dar-ul-Zafar (lit. 'Land of Victory'). Following the conquest, Aurangzeb spent a week in Gulbarga at the shrine of Gesu Daraz, and in mid-January 1687 set out to conquer the neighbouring Golconda Sultanate.

Sikandar Adil Shah was initially confined in Daulatabad, but was later kept as a prisoner at the mobile imperial camp with Aurangzeb. Archival court proceedings of Aurangzeb's reign (akhbarat) note that Aurangzeb later had an audience with Sikandar Adil Shah in 1694, asking the deposed ruler about the realities of ruling the Deccan. He died on 3 April 1700 at Satara when Aurangzeb was engaged in its siege; the Mughal state allocated funds for his funeral. Sikandar Adil Shah's family also became political prisoners in the Mughal camp's imperial harem, guarded by eunuchs. Marital ties were established with the former royalty, such as that of Sikandar Adil Shah's daughter Taj Sultana to Mughal prince Kam Bakhsh.

In the years following the Mughal conquest of Bijapur, the city's population diminished greatly, and the cityscape was war-torn. Several had fled the city, and a cholera epidemic broke out the year after the conquest in the Bijapur plateau, which claimed many lives. Richard Eaton suggests the epidemic may have resulted from the Mughal siege. A census taken by Aurangzeb in the year 1690 showed that the city's population had halved.

The conquest of Bijapur (and Golconda) did not stabilize the Mughal position in the Deccan like Aurangzeb may have expected. Aurangzeb would never return to the Mughal capital city of Delhi in the north, but would continue to fight Maratha resistance in the Deccan until his death. The province of Bijapur would be held briefly by the Mughals before seceding in the early 18th century as part of the Nizam-administered Deccan.
