= Nusrati =

Urdu poet

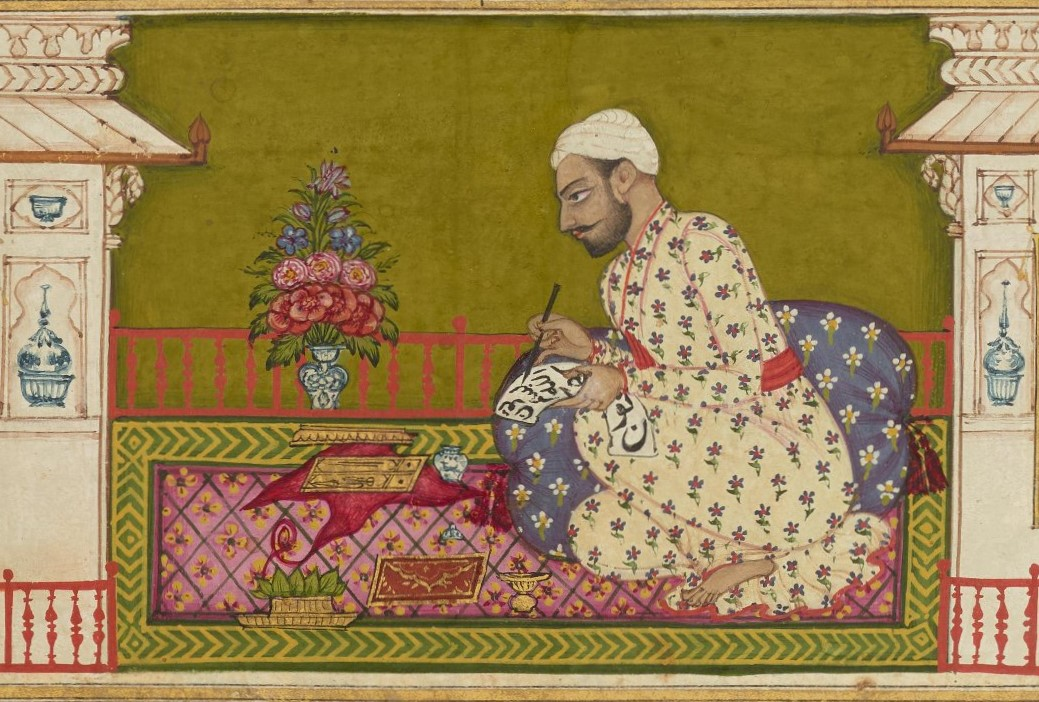
Nusrati writing the Gulshan-i ʿishq, from a manuscript of 1743

Muḥammad Nuṣrat (died 1674), called Nuṣratī ('victorious'), was a Deccani Urdu poet.

== Life ==
Nuṣratī was born in the Carnatic region into an elite Muslim family of Brahmin origin. He lived as a Sufi dervish before moving to Bijapur. There he was made a mansabdar under Sultan ʿAlī II (r. 1656–1672) of the ʿĀdil-Shāhī dynasty. For his poem ʿAlī-nāma (c. 1665), he was named poet laureate (malik al-shuʿarāʾ). He died at an old age in 1674 or 1683.

== Works ==
Nuṣratī wrote in the Deccani variety of Urdu and Persian. His poetry uses archaic language and a complex style. He was a prominent practitioner of the qaṣīda, ghazal and especially mathnawī forms. One of his earliest works, Miʿrāj-nāma, was written for Sultan Muḥammad ʿĀdil Shāh (r. 1627–1656).

His most original work is the ʿAlī-nāma, an epic celebration of ʿAlī II's wars against the Mughals and Marathas. It is the earliest panegyric of a ruler in Deccani. Nuṣratī himself claimed to have invented a new poetic form with this work, which is "the only thing of its kind in Urdu". It is patterned on the Persian Shāh-nāma. Grahame Bailey calls it the greatest poem ever written at Bijapur.

Nuṣratī's final poem, written in a similar vein, is Taʾrīkh-i Sikandarī (also called the Taʾrīkh-i Bahlol Khani), a celebration of Bahlol Khan's victory over Shivaji at the battle of Umrani in 1672. It was written for ʿAlī II's successor, Sikandar. Unlike the ʿAlīnāma, written at the height of Bijapur's power, it is "largely in a minor key". Other works of Nuṣratī's include Gulshan-i ʿishq (1658), a collection of odes and the lyric collection Guldasta-yi ʿishq. Gulshan-i ʿishq is a highly conventional romance.

== Works cited ==
- Bailey, Thomas Grahame (1932). A History of Urdu Literature. Oxford University Press.
- Dayal, Subah (2020). "On Heroes and History: Responding to the Shahnama in the Deccan, 1500–1800". In Overton, Keelan (ed.). Iran and the Deccan: Persianate Art, Culture, and Talent in Circulation, 1400–1700. Indiana University Press. pp. 421–446. ISBN 978-0-253-04894-3.
- Haywood, J. A. (1995). "Nuṣratī". In Bosworth, C. E.; van Donzel, E.; Heinrichs, W. P. & Lecomte, G. (eds.). The Encyclopaedia of Islam, Second Edition. Volume VIII: Ned–Sam. Leiden: E. J. Brill. p. 154. doi:10.1163/1573-3912_islam_SIM_6004. ISBN 978-90-04-09834-3.
- Naim, C. M. (2017). "Urdu Poetry". In Greene, Roland (ed.). The Princeton Encyclopedia of Poetry and Poetics (4th ed.). Princeton University Press.
- Sadiq, Muhammad (1995) [1964]. A History of Urdu Literature (2nd ed.). Oxford University Press. ISBN 978-0-19-563145-6.
- Saksena, Ram Babu (1990) [1927]. A History of Urdu Literature. Asian Educational Services. ISBN 978-81-206-0616-6.
- Sharma, Sunil (2020). "Forging a Canon of Dakhni Literature: Translations and Retellings from Persian". In Overton, Keelan (ed.). Iran and the Deccan: Persianate Art, Culture, and Talent in Circulation, 1400–1700. Indiana University Press. pp. 401–420. ISBN 978-0-253-04894-3.
- Zaidi, Ali Jawad (1993). A History of Urdu Literature. Sahitya Akademi. ISBN 978-81-7201-291-5.
