= Gulshan-i 'Ishq =

Romantic allegorical poem by the Urdu poet Nusrati

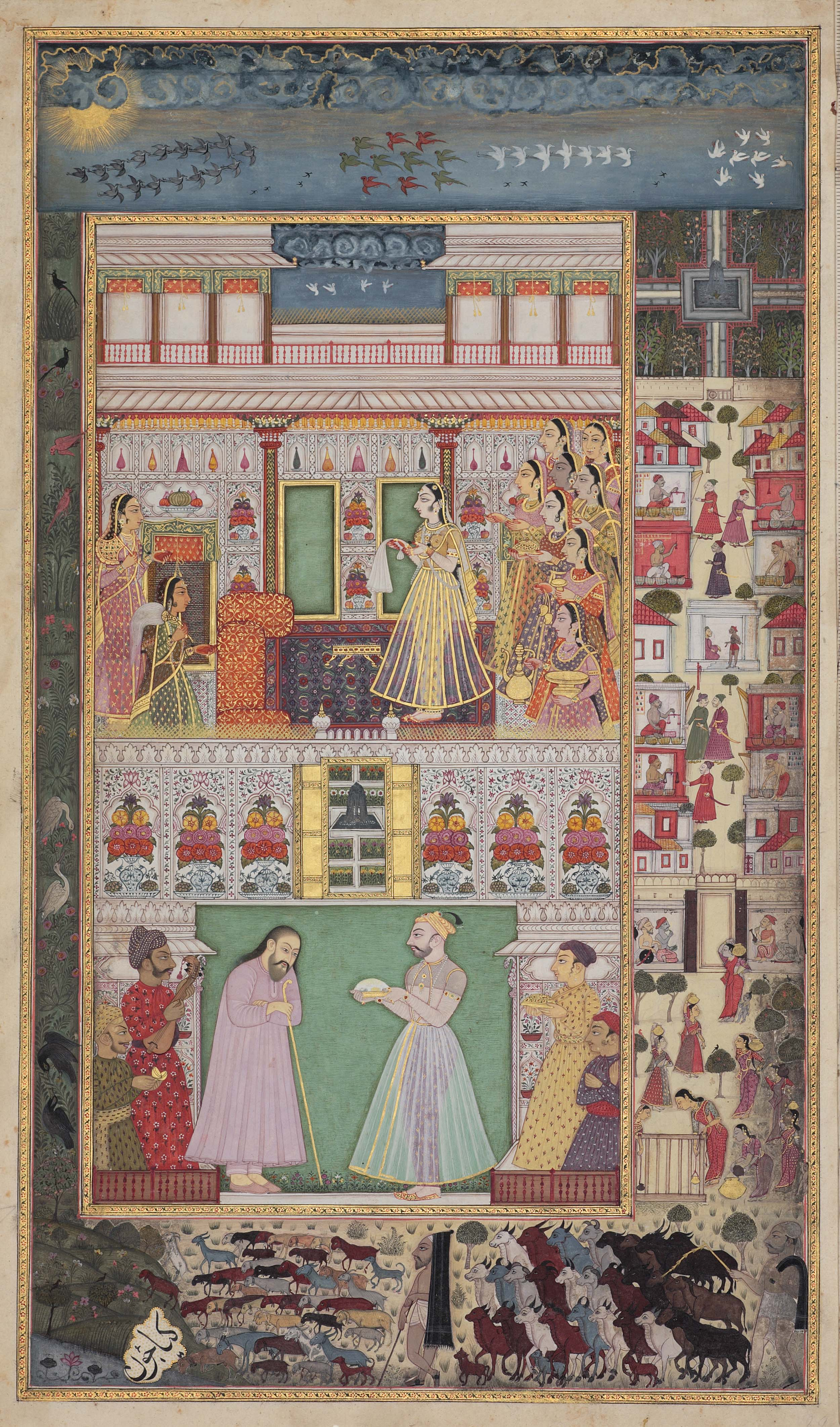
- Upper: the queen in her private apartment. Lower: King Bikram offers food to the holy man Roshan-i Dil. From the 1710 manuscript in the Khalili Collection of Islamic Art
- Author: Nusrati
- Language: Deccani language
- Genre: Romantic poetry, Sufi poetry
- Publication date: 1657
- Publication place: Bijapur

The Gulshan-i 'Ishq ("The Rose Garden of Love") is a romantic poem written in 1657 by the Indian Sufi poet Nusrati. Written in the Deccani language, it combines literary and cultural traditions from India and Iran. It describes the journey of a prince through a series of fantastical scenes in search of a woman he saw in a dream, leading to their union in a rose garden. Manuscripts of the poem, illustrated with lavish paintings, have survived from the 18th century to the present day.

== Background ==
Nusrati was a poet laureate in the court of Ali Adil Shah II, the Sultan of Bijapur. He has been described as Bijapur's greatest poet. His poem takes inspiration from another Sufi romance, the 16th-century Madhumalati written in the Hindawi language by Sayyid Manjhan Shattari Rajgiri. It also resembles Mihr-o-Māh, a Persian poem written in the Mughal court three years before the Gulshan-i 'Ishq.

Deccani poetry at this time was strongly influenced by Persian poetry, but combined it with a distinctively Indian flavour. The use of a garden as a metaphor was well established in Deccani literature, with an unkempt garden representing a world in disarray and a "garden of love" suggesting fulfilment and harmony. Deccani romantic literature used many layers of symbolism, involved convoluted plots, and normally centred around a heroic quest that is happily resolved at the end. These features are all present in the Gulshan-i 'Ishq.

== Story ==
Though the plot of Gulshan-i 'Ishq was adapted from previous romantic poems, Nusrati's version was distinctive because of his extensive use of descriptions, both of natural scenery and of romantic love.

The protagonists of the story are Prince Manohar and Madhumalati. Manohar falls in love with Madhumalati after seeing her in a dream, and his adventures in search of her take him to fantastical creatures and mythical figures, which are illustrated in the manuscripts' paintings. Much of the text describes palaces and natural scenes which Manohar visits. Deserts or dark forests represented being caught in life's problems. The rose garden serves as a poetic metaphor for spiritual and romantic union. Nusrati uses the poem to compliment his patron, listing the virtues of a good ruler and crediting them to Ali Adil Shah II.

A prelude to the main story describes the journey of Manohar's father, King Bikram of Banakgir, that results in Manohar's birth. Bikram is a perfect ruler who is despondent that his queen has not borne him a child. He offers food to a holy man, expecting a blessing in return. The man's name, Roshan-i Dil, can be read as "king of the heart". The holy man refuses the food and leaves without a blessing. Bikram goes in search of him, renouncing his comforts and living a life of extreme poverty as an ascetic with a begging bowl. After a hard journey through desert and wasteland, he eventually encounters Roshan-i Dil again in a beautiful garden filled with joyous creatures. Having been through a transformative journey and experienced hunger and thirst, he is worthy and is granted a magical fruit which allows his wife to conceive.

== Manuscripts ==
Nusrati's extensive descriptions of nature and landscapes, from bleak settings to paradisiacal gardens, inspired the painters who illustrated manuscripts of the poem. No illustrated manuscripts of the poem from Bijapur still exist, but some later creations have survived from a period when Hyderabad took over as the cultural centre of Deccani art.

One illustrated manuscript, created at Hyderabad around the year 1710, is now dispersed across several collections, including the Khalili Collection of Islamic Art and the Metropolitan Museum of Art. Its text is in the Deccani Urdu language. The paintings combine scenes from the narrative with marginal illustrations of rural, urban, and court life. The figures and landscapes reflect the influence of the late Golconda style of Deccan painting.

Another illustrated manuscript dates from AH 1156 (1743–44 AD) and is now in the Philadelphia Museum of Art. It includes 97 colourful paintings and is signed by the calligrapher Ahmad ibn Abdullah Nadkar. The Salar Jung Museum in Hyderabad has eight more complete manuscripts.

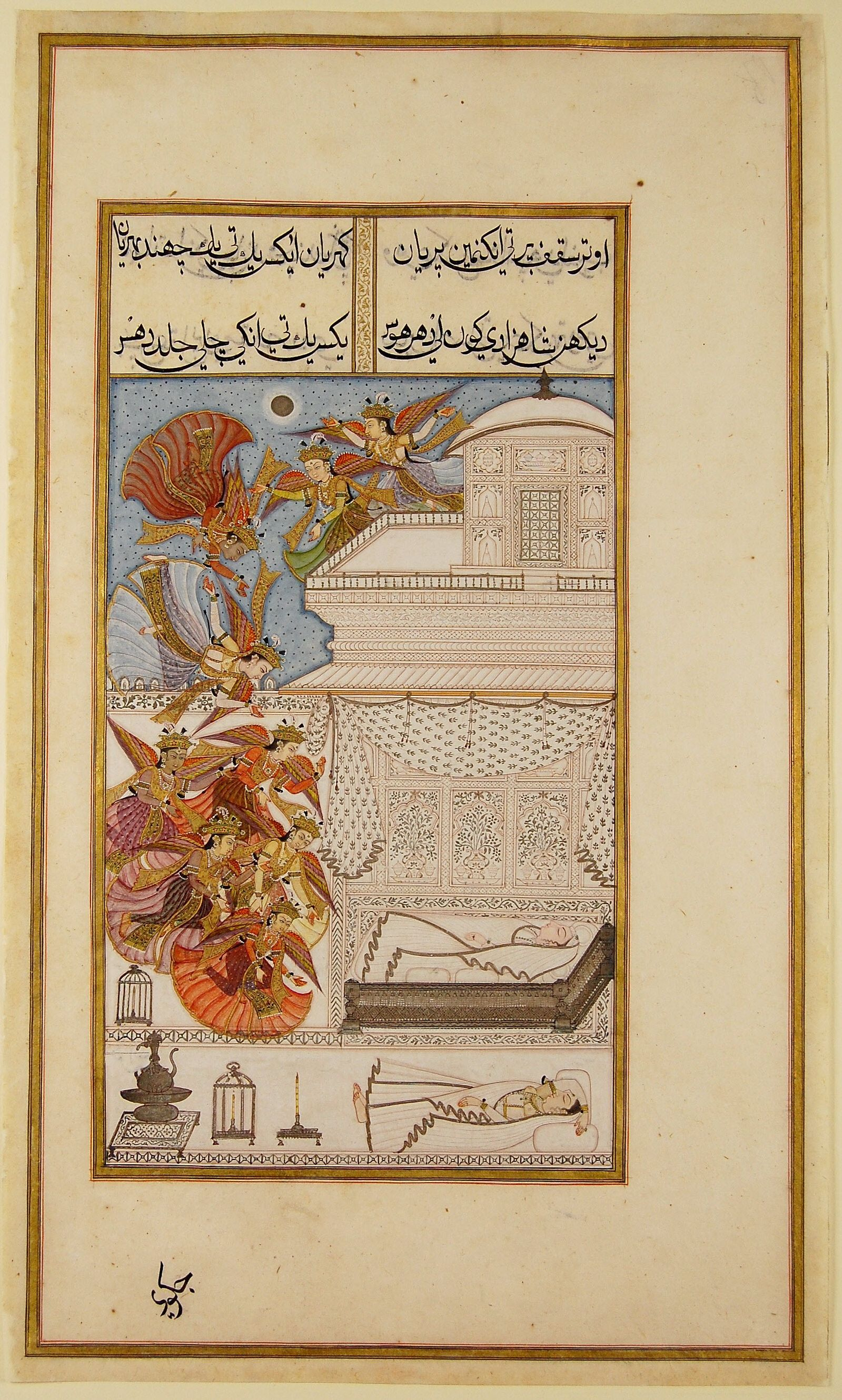
Fairies descend to the chamber of Prince Manohar, Metropolitan Museum of Art

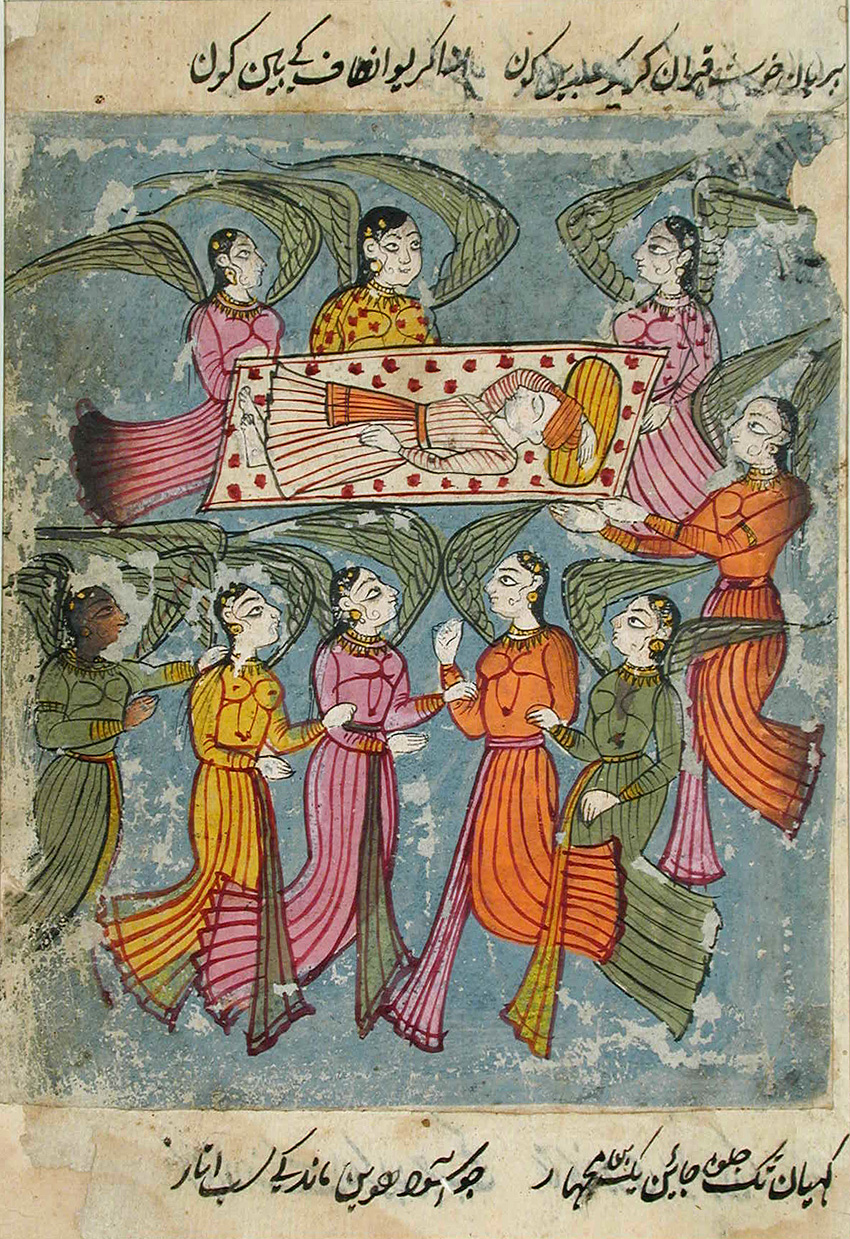
Angels carry Manohar in his bed, San Diego Museum of Art

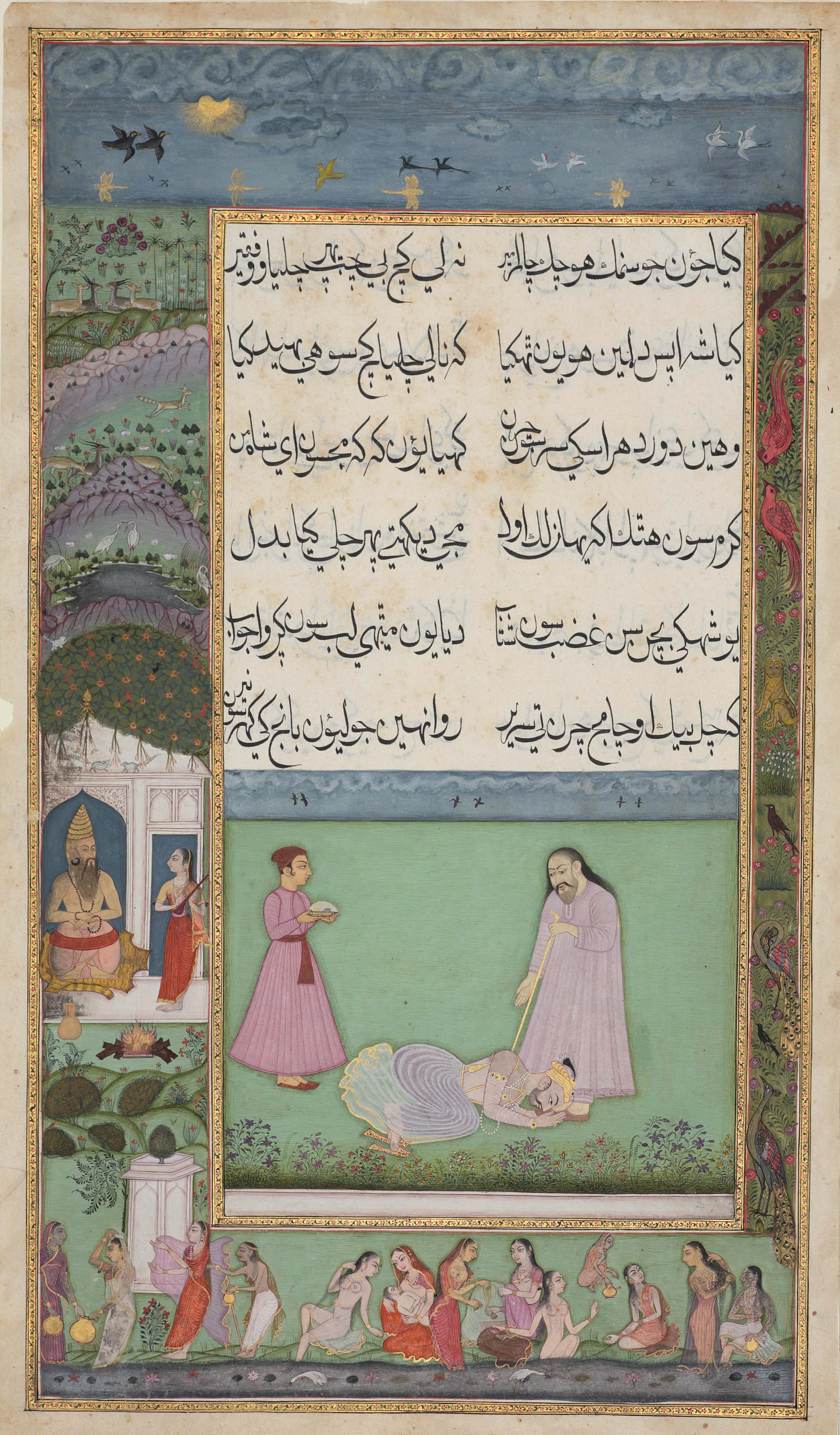
Bikram prostrates himself before Roshan-i Dil, Khalili Collection of Islamic Art

== Derivative works ==
In 2016 the Philadelphia Museum of Art commissioned Pakistani-American visual artist Shahzia Sikander to create a ten-minute video work, "Disruption as Rapture", that animates images from its manuscript of the Gulshan-i ‘Ishq.

== See also ==
- Gulshan-i Raz
