= Vidya Vindu Singh =

Indian author (born 1945)

PS Dr Vidya Vindu Singh
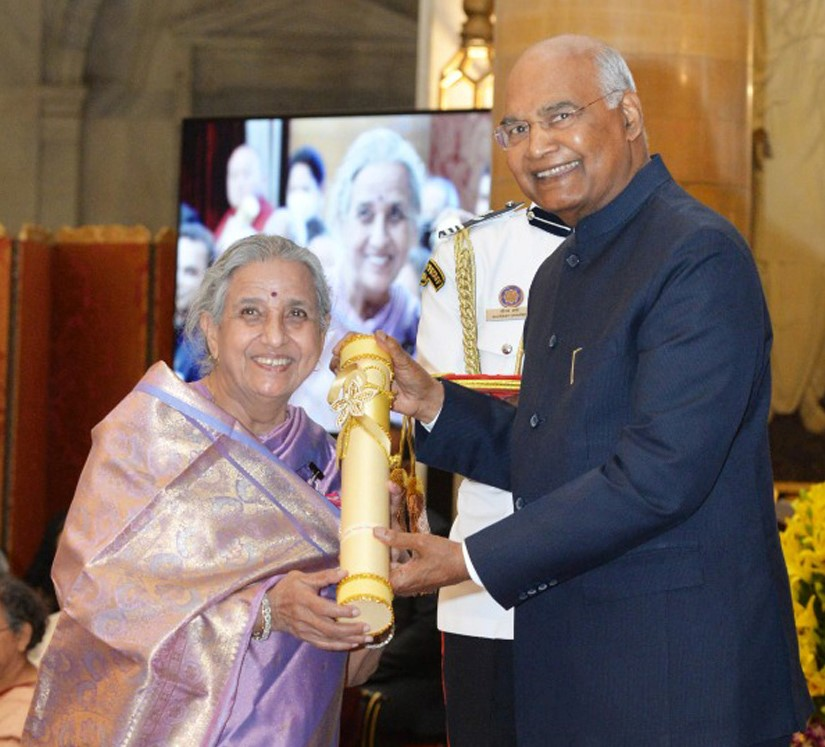
- Vidya Vindu Singh receiving Padma Shri award from President Ram Nath Kovind
- Born: 2 July 1945 (age 81); Faizabad, Uttar Pradesh
- Occupation: Writer
- Writing career
- Language: Hindi and Awadhi
- Notable awards: Padma Shri (2022)

Vidya Vindu Singh (born 2 July 1945) is an Indian author in Hindi and Awadhi languages. She is best known for her broad work in folk and children's literature. Singh has been awarded Padma Shri in 2022 by the Government of India for her contributions in the field of literature & education.

== Early life and education ==
Born in the Jaitpur village of Faizabad district in Uttar Pradesh, Vidya is the daughter of Devanarayan and Pranadevi Singh.

Her initial education was completed from Jalalpur. Thereafter, she completed her M. A. in Hindi literature from Agra University followed by a PhD from Banaras Hindu University.

== Career ==
She has published more than hundred works which include collections of poems, stories and Awadhi folk songs. Moreover, she has also composed more than two dozen folk songs for the festival of Raksha Bandhan in Awadhi and other regional dialects of the region. Apart from her contribution to literature, she is also known for her social work.

== Bibliography ==
- विद्या विन्दु सिंह की 21 कहानियाँ. (2022). (n.p.): Kalpana Prakashan.
- लडडू गोपाल के माई (Laddu Gopal ke Mai): अवधी उपन्यास. (2022). (n.p.): Alina Books.
- फुलवा बरन मन सीता (Phulwa Baran Man Sita): (अवधी कविताएं). (2021). (n.p.): Kalpana Prakashan.
- सड़क पर उगते बच्चे (Sadak Par Ugte Bacche): लघुकथाएँ. (2021). (n.p.): K.K. Publications.
- Awadhi Lokgeet Virasat. (2021). (n.p.): Prabhat Prakashan.
- Uttar Pradesh Ki Lokkathayen. (2021). (n.p.): Prabhat Prakashan.
- Vindu, V. S. (2018). Avadhi Vachik Katha Lok: Abhipray Chintan. India: Prabhat Prakashan Pvt. Limited.
- Siṃha, V. V. (2015). HIRANYAGARBHA. India: Gṛaṇtha Akādamī.
- Siṃha, V. V. (2014). Jangnama. India: Prabhat Prakashan.
- Siṃha, V. V. (2013). Shilantar. India: Grantha Akādamī.
- Siṃha, V. V. (2012). Dholak Rani More Nit Uthi Ayu. India: Jñāna Gaṅgā.
- Siṃha, V. V. (2012). Kāśīvāsa. India: Grantha Akādamī.

== Awards ==
- 2022 - Padma Shri
- 2016 - Hindi Gaurav Samman
- Mahadevi Verma Award
