= Ramai Kaka =

Indian poet, novelist, essayist and story-writer

Chandra Bhushan Trivedi
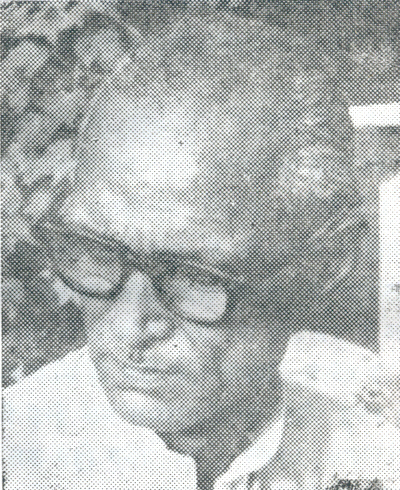
- Born: 2 February 1915; Rawatpur, Unnao
- Died: 18 April 1982 (aged 67)
- Writing career
- Pen name: Ramai Kaka
- Language: Awadhi

Chandra Bhushan Trivedi (2 February 1915 – 18 April 1982), better known by his pen name Ramai Kaka, was an Indian poet and writer who wrote in the Awadhi language.
