= Awadhi language =

Indo-Aryan language

Awadhi
- Audhī , Avadhī
- अवधी • 𑂃𑂫𑂡𑂲 • اودهي
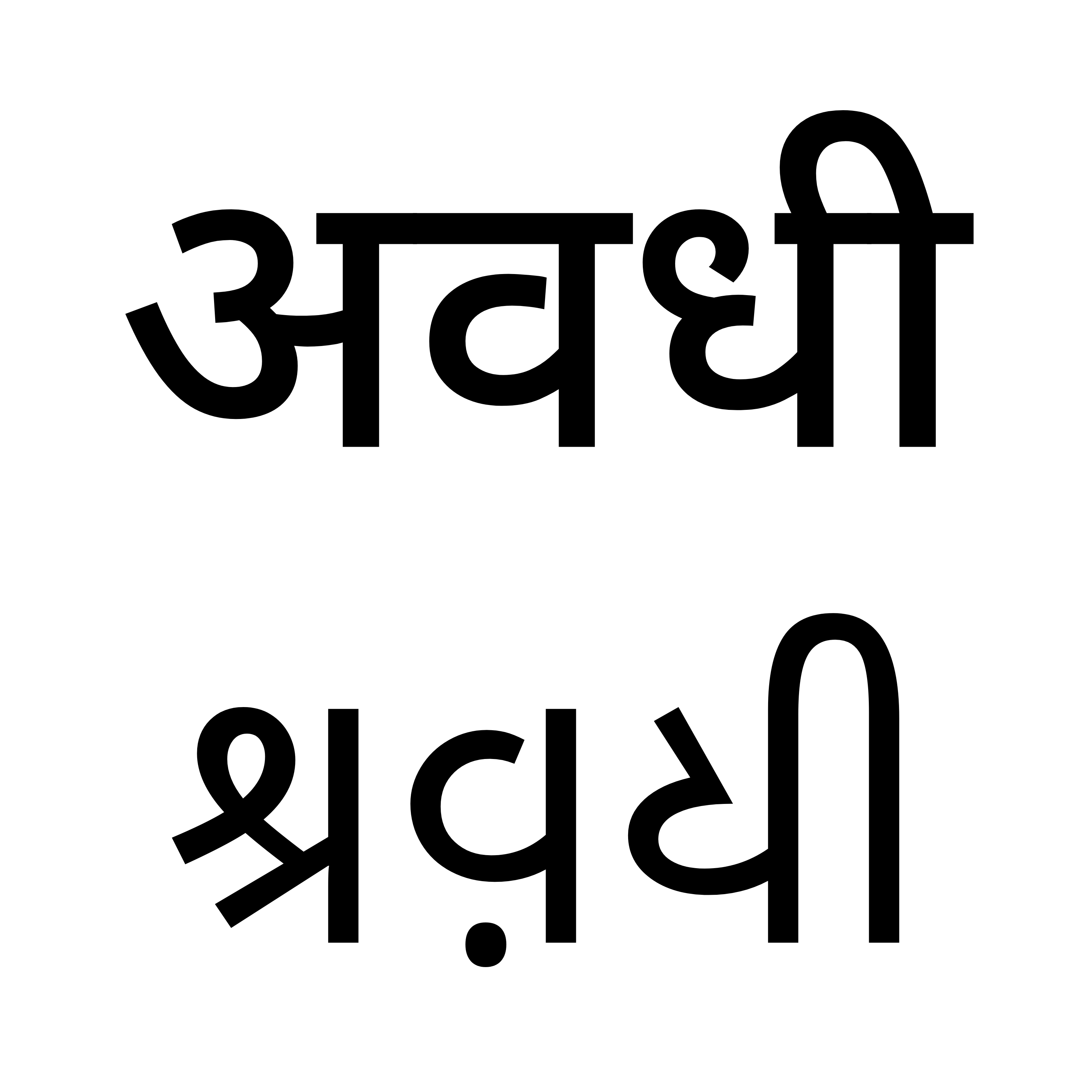
- The word "Awadhi" written in Devanagari (above) and Kaithi (below) scripts
- Pronunciation: [əʋ.d̪ʱi]
- Native to: India; Nepal
- Region: Awadh; Terai
- Ethnicity: Awadhis
- Native speakers: 3.85 million in India (2011); 502,000 in Nepal (2015)
- Language family: Indo-European: Indo-Iranian; Indo-Aryan; Central Indo-Aryan; Eastern Hindi; Awadhi
- Early forms: Ardhamagadhi Prakrit: Ardhamagadhi Apabhraṃśa
- Dialects: Pardesi; Gangapari; Uttari; Mirzapuri; Kanpuriya; Azamgarhi; Fiji Hindi; Caribbean Hindustani (incl. Sarnami Hindustani); Mauritian Hindustani; South African Hindustani (Naitali)
- Writing system: Devanagari (current); Kaithi (historical); Perso-Arabic; Latin-Roman

Official status
- Recognised minority language in: Nepal; Lumbini Province; Fiji (as Fiji Hindi); Mauritius (as Mauritian Bhojpuri)

Language codes
- ISO 639-2: awa
- ISO 639-3: awa
- Glottolog: awad1243 gang1265 Gangapari mirz1238 Mirzapuri utta1238 Uttari azam1235 Azamgarhi
- Linguasphere: 59-AAF-ra
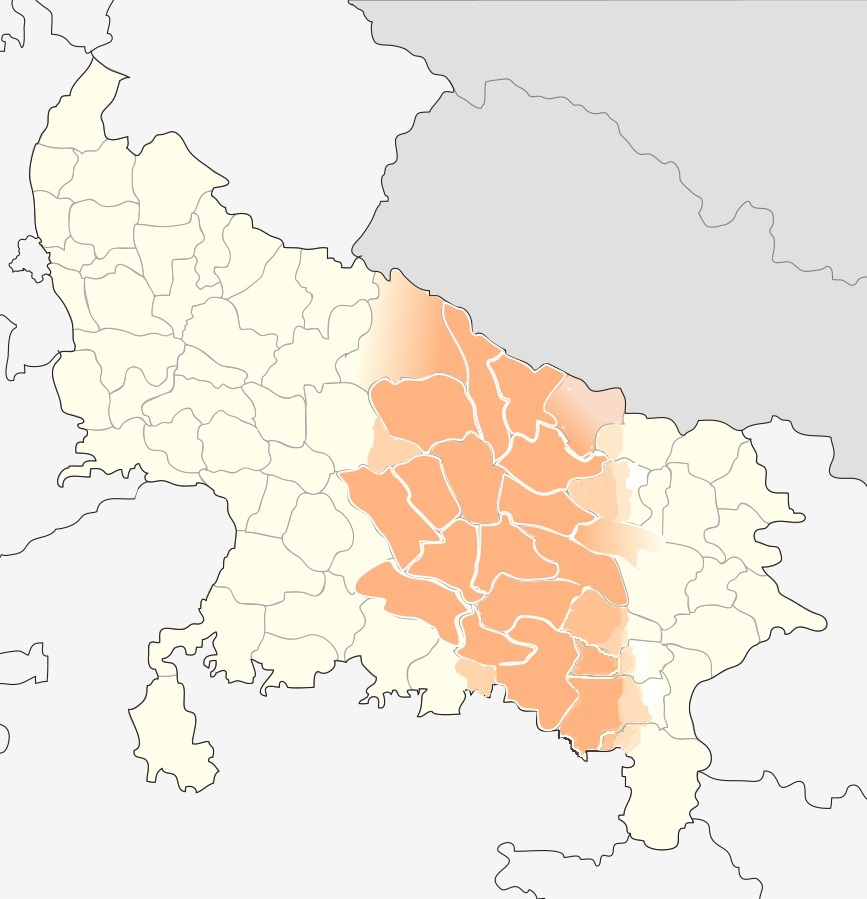
- Linguistic Boundaries Of Awadhi In Uttar Pradesh State

Awadhi, (Note: (Hindi pronunciation: [əʋ.d̪ʱi]; Devanagari: अवधी, Kaithi: 𑂃𑂫𑂡𑂲)) also known as Audhi, is an Indo-Aryan language belonging to the Indo-Iranian subdivision of the Indo-European languages. It is spoken in the Awadh region of Uttar Pradesh in northern India and in the Terai region of Lumbini Province in southern Nepal. The name Awadh is connected to Ayodhya, the ancient city, which is regarded as the homeland of the Hindu deity Rama, the earthly avatar of Vishnu. Awadhi is also widely spoken, along with its neighboring Bhojpuri, by the diaspora of Indians descended from those who left as indentured labourers during the colonial era. Along with Braj, it was used widely as a literary vehicle before being displaced by Hindi in the 19th century. Though distinct from standard Hindi, it continues to be spoken today in its unique form in many districts of central and eastern Uttar Pradesh.

The Indian government considers Awadhi to be a greater mother-tongue grouped under Eastern Hindi languages. Standard Hindi serves as the lingua franca of the region; Hindi, rather than Awadhi, is used for school instruction as well as administrative and official purposes and its literature falls within the scope of Hindi literature. Some of the most culturally signifiant Hindu text works in Indian literature like the Ramcharitmanas and Hanuman Chalisa have been written in Awadhi.

Alternative names of Awadhi include Baiswāri (after the subregion of Baiswara), as well as the sometimes ambiguous Pūrbī, literally meaning "eastern", and Kōsalī (named after the ancient Kosala Kingdom).

== Geographic distribution ==
=== In India ===
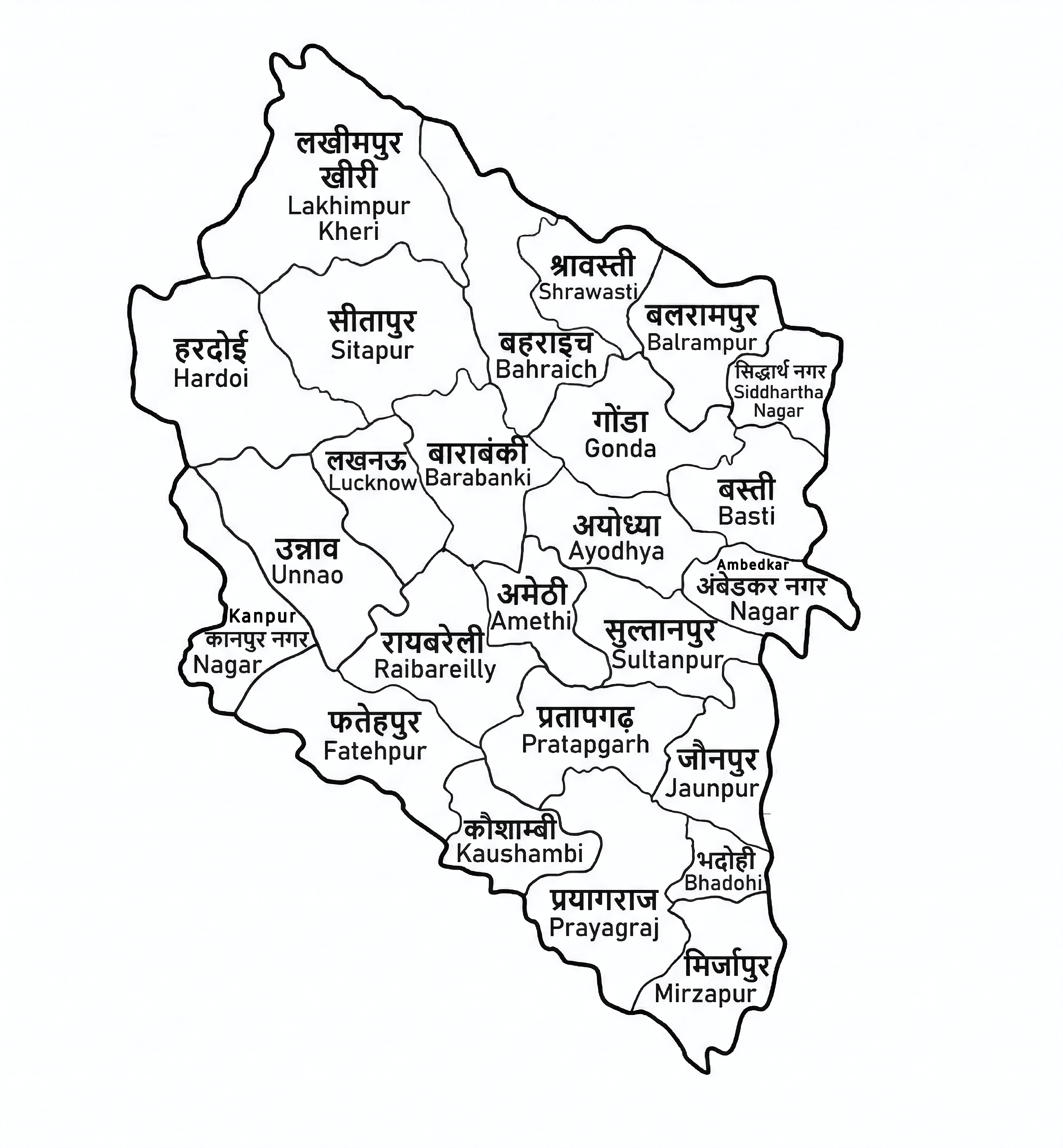
Districts of Uttar Pradesh where Awadhi is spoken

Awadhi is predominantly spoken in the Awadh region encompassing central and Eastern Uttar Pradesh, along with the lower part of the Ganga-Yamuna doab. In the west, it is bounded by Western Hindi, specifically Kannauji and Bundeli, while in the east, Bhojpuri from the Bihari group of Eastern Indo-Aryan languages is spoken. In the north, it is bounded by the country of Nepal and in the south by Bagheli, which shares a great resemblance with Awadhi.

The following districts of North and Central UP speak Awadhi-

- Lakhimpur Kheri (along with Kannauji)
- Sitapur (along with Kannauji)
- Unnao
- Fatehpur
- Barabanki
- Lucknow
- Rae Bareli
- Amethi
- Bahraich
- Shrawasti
- Kanpur

North-eastern part of UP where Awadhi is spoken includes districts :-

- Ayodhya (older capital of Awadh or Oudh)
- Ambedkar Nagar
- Prayagraj
- Mirzapur (western & central parts)
- Jaunpur (western parts)
- Bhadohi (western parts)
- Sultanpur
- Pratapgarh
- Gonda
- Balrampur
- Basti (western parts)
- Siddharthnagar (western parts)

=== In Nepal ===
The Language Commission of Nepal has recommended Tharu and Awadhi as official language in Lumbini province. Awadhi is spoken in two provinces in Nepal:

- Lumbini Province
  - Banke District
  - Bardiya District
  - Dang District
  - Kapilvastu District
- Sudurpashchim Province
  - Kailali District
  - Kanchanpur District

=== Outside South Asia ===
A language influenced by Awadhi (as well as other languages) is also spoken as a lingua franca for Indians in Fiji and is referred to as Fijian Hindi. According to Ethnologue, it is a type of Awadhi influenced by Bhojpuri and is also classified as Eastern-Hindi. Caribbean Hindustani spoken by Indians in Suriname, Trinidad and Tobago, and Guyana is based on Bhojpuri and partly influenced by Awadhi. The Hindustani that is spoken in South Africa and the Bhojpuri spoken in Mauritius is also partly influenced by Awadhi.

== Classification ==
Linguistic classification of Awadhi language.

Awadhi is an Indo-European language and belongs to the Indo-Aryan sub-group of the Indo-Iranian language family. Within the Indo-Aryan dialect continuum, it falls under the East-Central zone of languages and is often recognised as Eastern-Hindi. It is generally believed that an older form of Ardhamagadhi, which agreed partly with Sauraseni and partly with Magadhi Prakrit, could be the basis of Awadhi.

The closest relative of Awadhi is the Bagheli language as genealogically both descend from the same 'Ardha-Magadhi'. Most early Indian linguists regarded Bagheli merely as 'the southern form of Awadhi', but recent studies accept Bagheli as a separate dialect at par with Awadhi and not merely a sub-dialect of it.

== Dialects ==
Baburam Saksena divided Awadhi into three major divisions: Western Awadhi, Central Awadhi, and Eastern Awadhi.

Among the Western Awadhi dialects are those of Lakhimpur Kheri, Sitapur, Lucknow, Unnao, and Fatehpur. The Sitapuri dialect in particular showcases an increased degree of Kannauji influence, which Saksena posited as possibly being as a result of frequent movements of Mughal armies from Kannauj to Khairabad.

Among the Central Awadhi dialects are those of Bahraich, Barabanki, and Raebareli.

Among the Eastern Awadhi dialects are those of Gonda, Faizabad, Sultanpur, Pratapgarh, Allahabad, central & western Mirzapur, and western Jaunpur. Azamgarhi, spoken by sections of the Muslim population of Azamgarh, is also often classified to be an Eastern Awadhi dialect, though it bears heavy Bhojpuri influence. Glottolog, contrasting with Saksena's classifications, lists Gangapari, Mirzapuri, Uttari, and Azamgarhi as the dialects of Eastern Awadhi.

== Literature ==
=== Late-medieval and early-modern India ===
In this period, Awadhi became the vehicle for epic poetry in northern India. Its literature is mainly divided into: bhaktīkāvya (devotional poetry) and premākhyān (romantic tales).

==== Bhaktīkāvyas ====
The most important work, probably in any modern Indo-Aryan language, came from the poet-saint Tulsidas in the form of Ramcharitmanas (1575 C.E.) or "The Lake of the Deeds of Rama", written in doha-chaupai metre. Its plot is mostly derivative, either from the original Rāmāyaṇa by Valmiki or from the Adhyātma Rāmāyaṇa, both of which are in Sanskrit. Mahatma Gandhi had acclaimed the Ramcharitmanas as "the greatest book of all devotional literature" while western observers have christened it as "the Bible of Northern India". It is sometimes synonymously referred as 'Tulsidas Ramayana' or simply 'the Ramayana'.

Illustrations to the Ramcharitmanas of Tulsidas
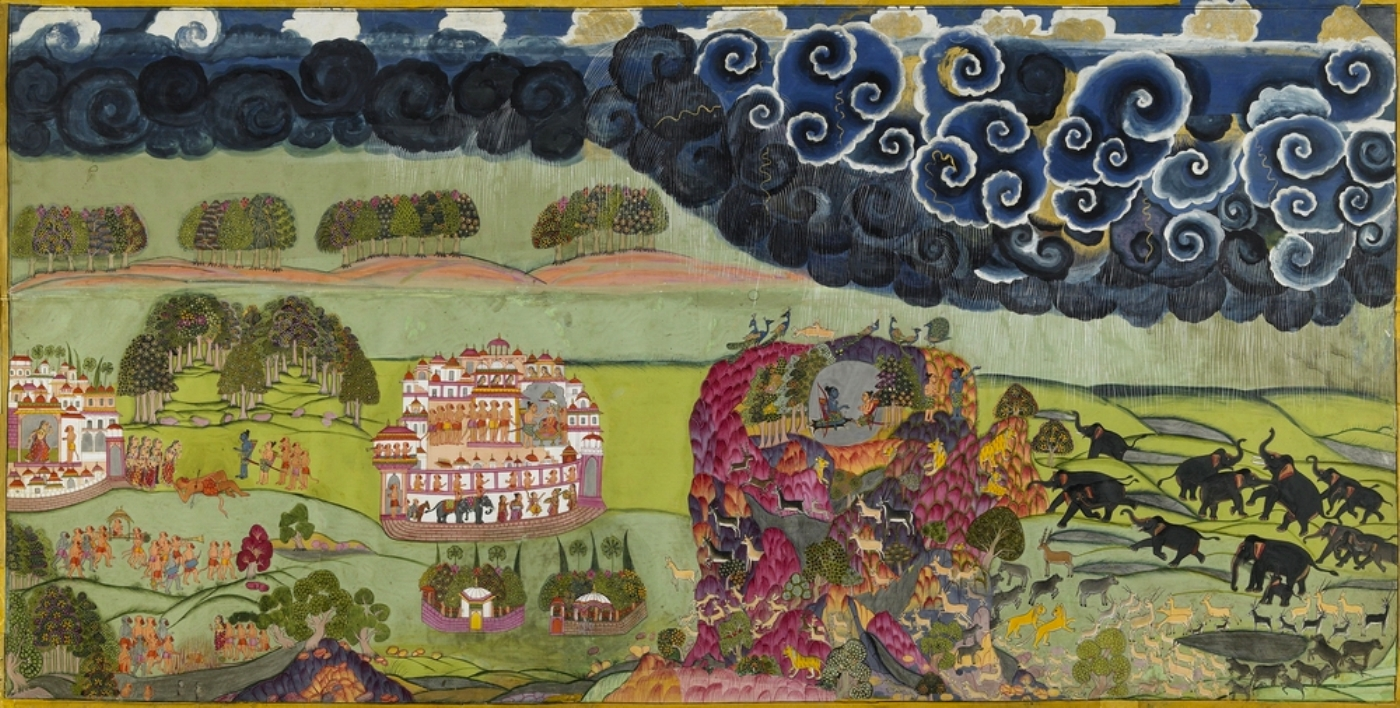
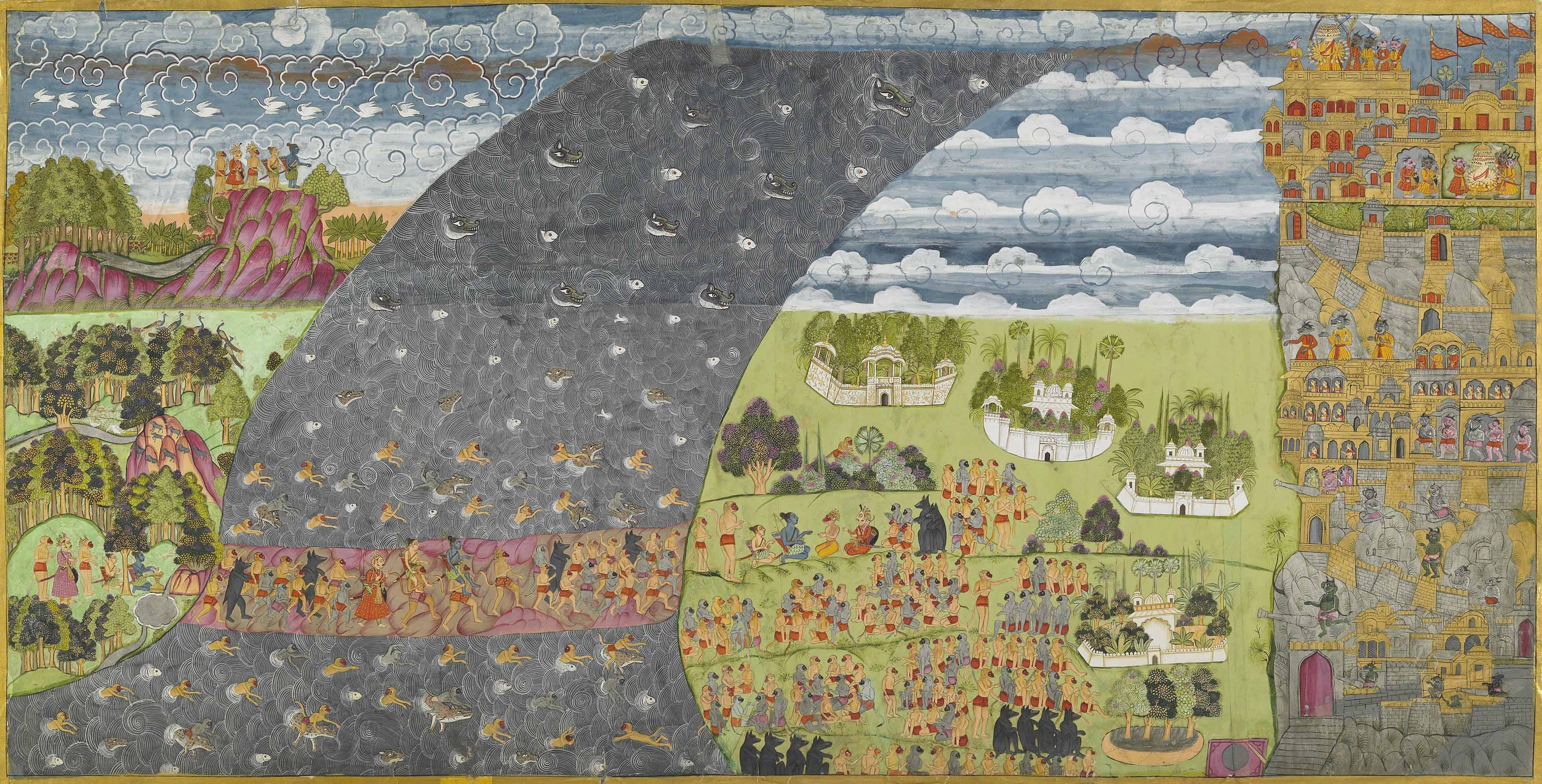
(a) Death of Vali: Rama and Lakshmana Wait Out the Monsoon, (b) Rama's Army Crossing the Ocean to Lanka.

Tulsidas's compositions Hanuman Chalisa, Pārvatī Maṅgala and Jānakī Maṅgala are also written in Awadhi.

अंडकोस प्रति प्रति निज रूपा।
देखेउँ जिनस अनेक अनूपा॥
अवधपुरी प्रति भुअन निनारी।
सरजू भिन्न भिन्न नर नारी॥

— Tulsidas, 7.81.3 chaupai, Ramcharitmanas
Translation:

In each universe I saw my own self,
As well as many an object beyond compare;
Each universe had its own Ayodhya,
With its own Saryu and its own men and women.

— Translation by R.C Prasad

सिंधु तीर एक भूधर सुंदर।
कौतुक कूदि चढ़ेउ ता-ऊपर॥
बार-बार रघुबीर सँभारी।
तरकेउ पवनतनय बल भारी॥

— Tulsidas, 5.1.3 chaupai, Ramcharitmanas
Translation:

On the sea-shore there was a mountain lovely,
He hopped to its peak sportively;
Over and again, the Lord he did recall
And the Son of Wind darted with energy no small.

— Translation

The first Hindi vernacular adaptation of the 'Dasam Skandha' of the Bhagavata Purana, the "Haricharit" by Lalachdas, who hailed from Hastigram (present-day Hathgaon near Rae Bareilly), was concluded in 1530 C.E. It circulated widely for a long time and scores of manuscript copies of the text have been found as far as eastern Uttar Pradesh and Bihar, Malwa and Gujarat, all written in the Kaithi script.

Satyavatī (ca. 1501) of Ishvaradas (of Delhi) under the reign of Sikander Lodi and Avadhabilāsa (1700 C.E.) of Laladas were also written in Awadhi. A translation of the Mahabharata called Bhasha Mahabharat was composed by Sabal Singh Chauhan, under his patron Raja Mitrasen of Etawah, a courtier of the court of Aurangzeb in the 17th century. This is the first complete verse translation of the epic into Awadhi Hindi language, composed in a manner and style of Tulsidas' fame chaupai metre.

Awadhi appeared as a major component in the works of Bhakti saints like Kabir, who used a language often described as being a pancmel khicṛī or "a hotch-potch" of several vernaculars. According to Sir George Abraham Grierson, the language of Kabir's major work Bijak is primarily Old Awadhi.

==== Premākhyāns ====
Illustrations to Awadhi Sufi texts

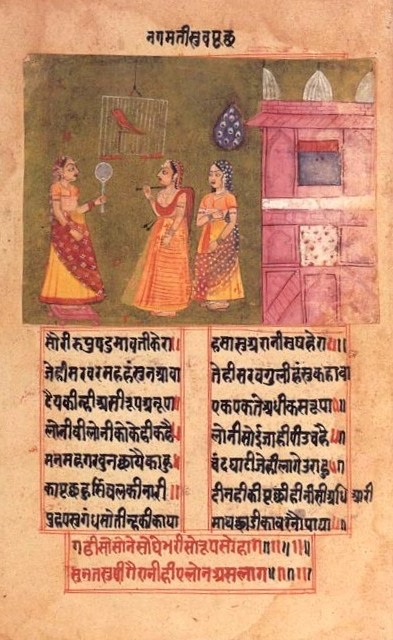
Queen Nagamati talks to her parrot, Padmavat, 1750 C.E.

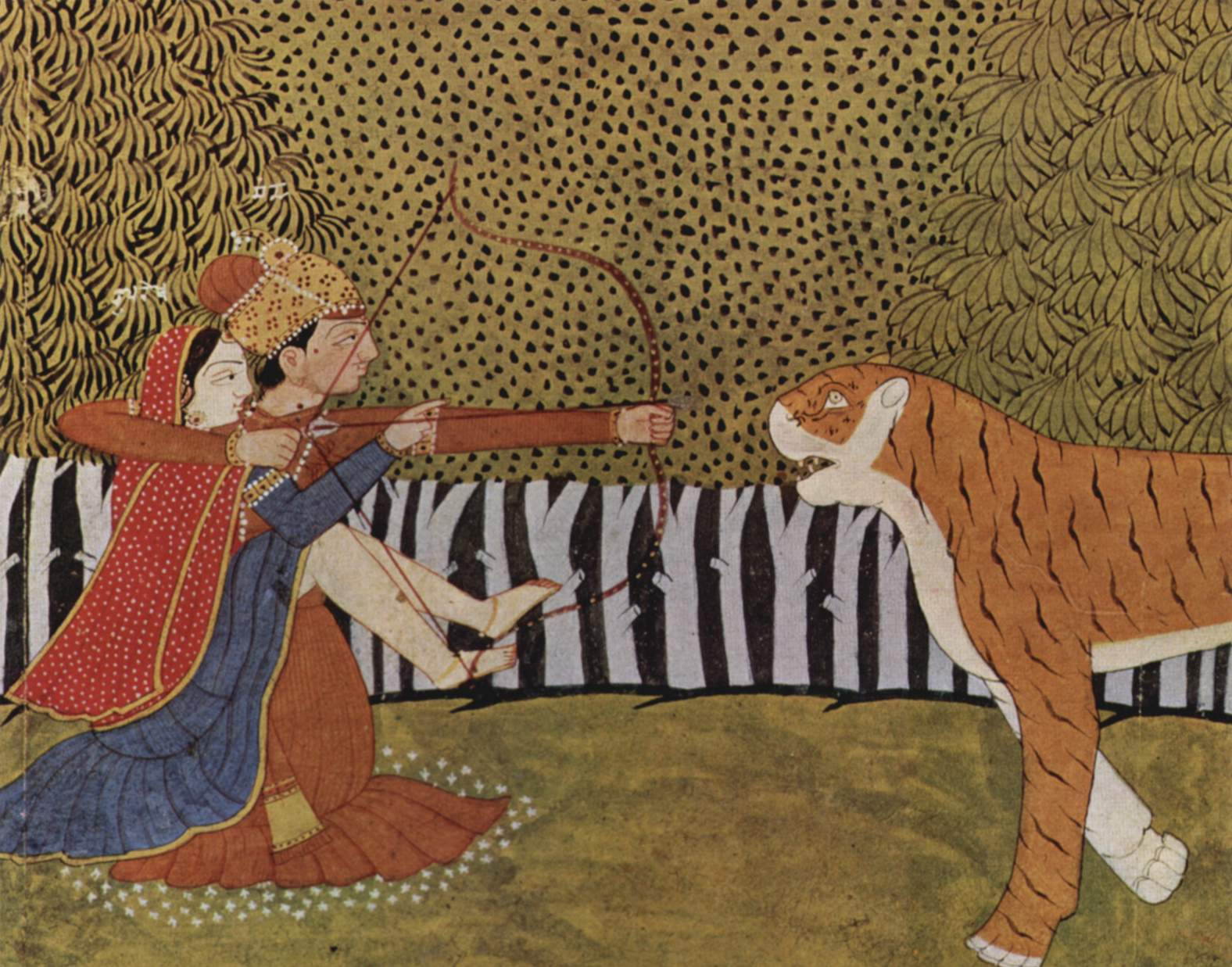
Lovers shoot at a tiger in the jungle. From the mystical Sufi text Madhumalati.

Awadhi also emerged as the favourite literary language of the Eastern Sufis from the last quarter of the 14th century onwards. It became the language of premākhyāns, romantic tales built on the pattern of Persian masnavi, steeped in Sufi mysticism but set in a purely Indian background, with a large number of motifs directly borrowed from Indian lore. The first of such premākhyān in the Awadhi language was Candāyan (1379 C.E.) of Maulana Da'ud. The tradition was carried forward by Jayasi, whose masterpiece, the Padmāvat (1540 C.E.) was composed under the reign of the famous ruler Sher Shah Suri. The Padmavat travelled far and wide, from Arakan to the Deccan, and was eagerly copied and retold in Persian and other languages.

Other prominent works of Jayasi such as Kānhāvat, Akhrāvaṭ and Ākhrī Kalām are also written in Awadhi.

I'll tell you about my great town, the ever-beautiful Jais.

In the satyayuga it was a holy place, then it was called the "Town of Gardens."
Then the treta went, and when the dvapara came, there was a great rishi called Bhunjaraja.
88,000 rishis lived here then, and dense ... and eighty-four ponds.
They baked bricks to make solid ghats, and dug eight-four wells.
Here and there they built handsome forts, at night they looked like stars in the sky.
They also put up several orchards with temples on top.

Doha: They sat there doing tapas, all those human avataras.They crossed this world doing homa and japa day and night.

— Jayasi, Kanhavat, ed. Pathak (8), 7–8.

The Awadhi romance Mirigāvatī (ca.1503) or "The Magic Doe", was written by Shaikh 'Qutban' Suhravardi, who was an expert and storyteller attached to the court-in-exile of Sultan Hussain Shah Sharqi of Jaunpur. Another romance named Madhumālatī or "Night Flowering Jasmine" by poet Sayyid Manjhan Rajgiri was written in 1545 C.E.

Amir Khusrau (d. 1379 C.E) is also said to have written some compositions in Awadhi.

=== Relationship with modern Hindi ===
Awadhi literature belongs to a multilingual literary culture of North India. Francesca Orsini's study of this culture, which focuses on Awadh and covers the late fourteenth to the early twentieth century, traces languages and literary forms that circulated across courtly, devotional and popular communities, and examines their later codification into separate literary histories of Hindi and Urdu. Colin Masica notes that the term "Hindi literary tradition" has sometimes been used in a wider sense to include pre-modern literature in Braj and Awadhi.

This does not mean that Awadhi was a direct linguistic precursor of modern Standard Hindi. Stuart McGregor notes that, despite its importance in Sufi and Ramaite literature, Avadhi from about 1600 was not as directly involved as Brajbhāsā in the development towards modern Hindi. R. S. McGregor identifies pre-nineteenth-century prose traditions in Braj Bhasha, Khari Boli and Rajasthani as antecedents of the Sanskritized, Khari Boli-based style of Standard Hindi that emerged in the nineteenth century.

The changing position of Awadhi can also be seen in colonial print culture. Sanjukta Poddar's study of Allahabad between 1890 and 1920 describes Braj Bhasha and Awadhi as traditional literary registers that were waning, while publications in them had become relatively few. She also shows that publishing in several languages and scripts continued in the city despite the growing dominance of Nagari. More broadly, Mithilesh Kumar Jha describes a process in which literary languages such as Braj and Awadhi came to be treated as varieties of modern Hindi, while noting that the distinction between language and dialect remains contested.

=== Modern India ===
The most significant contributions to the Awadhi literature in the modern period have come from writers like Ramai Kaka (1915–1982 C.E.), Balbhadra Prasad Dikshit better known as 'Padhees'(1898–1943 C.E.) and Vanshidhar Shukla (1904–1980 C.E.).

'Krishnayan' (1942 C.E.) is a major Awadhi epic-poem that Dwarka Prasad Mishra wrote in imprisonment during the Freedom Movement of India. In 2022 Dr. Vidya Vindu Singh has been awarded Padma Shri for her contribution in Awadhi literature.

== Phonology ==
=== Vowels ===
Awadhi possesses both voiced and voiceless vowels. The voiced vowels are: /ə/, /ʌ/, /aː/, /ɪ/, /iː/, /ʊ/, /uː/, /e/, /eː/, /o/, /oː/. The voiceless vowels, also described as "whispered vowels" are: /i̥/, /ʊ̥/, /e̥/. Voiceless vowels only occur at the end of a word.

Vowels of Awadhi
	Front	Central	Back
Close	iː i̥ ɪ		uː ʊ ʊ̥
Close-mid	e eː e̥		o oː
Mid		ə	
Open-mid		ʌ	
Open			aː

==== Vowel combinations ====
Diphthongs
Combination	Example		Meaning
Combination	IPA	Transliteration	Meaning
/ɪaː/	/d͡ʒɪaː/	jiā	"elder sister"
/ɪeː/	/d͡ʒɪeː/	jiē	"became alive"
/ʌiː/	/nʌiː/	naī	"new"
/ʌɪ/	/bʰʌɪ/	bhai	"became"
/ʌeː/	/gʌeː/	gaē	"(they) went"
/ʌʊ/	/t̪ʌʊ/	tau	"then"
/ʌuː/	/gʌuː/	gaū	"cow"
/ʊʌ/	/kʊ̃ʌn/	kũan	"wells (obl.)"
/ʊiː/	/d̪ʊiː/	duī	"two"
/ʊaː/	/bʊaː/	buā	"father's sister"
/uːiː/	/ruːiː/	rūī	"cotton"
/aːoː/	/aːoː/	āō	"come"
/aːeː/	/kʰaːeː/	khāē	"eaten"
/aːiː/	/aːiː/	āī	"came"
/aːuː/	/naːuː/	nāū	"barber"
/eːiː/	/d̪eːiː/	dēī	"will give"
/eːʊ/	/d̪eːʊ/	dēu	"give"
/oːɪ/	/hoːɪ/	hōi	"may be"
/oʊ/	/hoʊ/	hōu	"be"

Triphthongs
Combination	Example		Meaning
Combination	IPA	Transliteration	Meaning
/ɪeʊ/	/pɪeʊ/	pieu	"(you) drank"
/ʊɪaː/	/gʰʊ̃ɪaː/	ghũiā	"the root of Arum"
/aːeʊ/	/kʰaːeʊ/	khāeu	"(you) ate"
/ʌɪaː/	/bʰʌɪaː/	bhaiā	"brother"

=== Consonants ===
Consonant Phonemes of Awadhi Language
			Bilabial	Dental/ Alveolar	Retroflex	Palatal	Velar	Glottal
Nasal		unaspirated	m	n	(ɳ)	(ɲ)	(ŋ)	
Nasal		aspirated	mʱ	nʱ				
Plosive/ Affricate	voiceless	unaspirated	p	t	ʈ	tʃ	k	
Plosive/ Affricate	voiceless	aspirated	pʰ	tʰ	ʈʰ	tʃʰ	kʰ	
Plosive/ Affricate	voiced	unaspirated	b	d	ɖ	dʒ	ɡ	
Plosive/ Affricate	voiced	aspirated	bʱ	dʱ	ɖʱ	dʒʱ	ɡʱ	
Fricative				s				h~ɦ (Note: [h] occurs word-initially while [ɦ] occurs medially and finally.)
Liquid	rhotic	unaspirated		r	ɽ			
Liquid	rhotic	aspirated		rʱ	ɽʱ			
Liquid	lateral	unaspirated		l				
Liquid	lateral	aspirated		lʱ				
Approximant			ʋ			j		

== Grammar ==
=== Comparative grammar ===
Awadhi has many features that separate it from the neighbouring Western Hindi and Bihari vernaculars. In Awadhi, nouns are generally both short and long, whereas Western Hindi has generally short while Bihari generally employs longer and long forms. The gender is rigorously maintained in Western Hindi, Awadhi is a little loose yet largely preserved, while Bihari is highly attenuated. Regarding postpositions, Awadhi is distinguished from Western Hindi by the absence of agentive postposition in the former, agreeing with Bihari dialects. The accusative-dative postposition in Awadhi is /kaː/ or /kə/ while Western Hindi has /koː/ or /kɔː/ and Bihari has /keː/. The locative postposition in both Bihari and Western Hindi is /mẽː/ while Awadhi has /maː/. The pronouns in Awadhi have /toːɾ-/, /moːɾ-/ as personal genitives while /teːɾ-/, /meːɾ-/ are used in Western Hindi. The oblique of /ɦəmaːɾ/ is /ɦəmɾeː/ in Awadhi while it is /ɦəmaːɾeː/ in Western Hindi and /ɦəmrən'kæ/ in Bihari.

Another defining characteristic of Awadhi is the affix /-ɪs/, which marks the third-person past tense of transitive verbs as in /dɪɦɪs/ "he gave", /maːɾɪs/ "he hit". The neighbouring Bhojpuri has the distinctive (i) /laː/ enclitic in present tense (ii) /-l/ in past tense (iii) dative postposition /-laː/ which separates it from the Awadhi language.

=== Pronouns ===
First Person Pronouns of Awadhi
	Singular 'I/me/my'					Plural 'we/us/our'				
	Dir.	Ag.	Obl.	Dat.	Gen.	Dir.	Ag.	Obl.	Dat.	Gen.
Modern Standard Hindi	mãĩ मैं	mãĩ'nē मैंने	mujh मुझ	mujhē मुझे	mērā^{*} मेरा	ham हम	ham'nē हमने	ham हम	hamē̃ हमें	hamārā^{*} हमारा
Awadhi	mai (mãy) मै	–	ma(h)i महि	–	mōr^{*} मोर	ham हम	–	ham हम	hamai हमै	hamār^{*} हमार
(Substitute or other forms in Awadhi)	-	–	mō मो	mai'kā मइका, mō'kā मोका	–	–	–	–	ham'kā हमका	–

Second Person Pronouns of Awadhi
	Singular						Plural					
	Dir.	Ag.	Obl.	Dat.	Gen.	Hon.	Dir.	Ag.	Obl.	Dat.	Gen.	Hon.
Modern Standard Hindi	tū	tū'nē	tujh	tujhē	tērā^{*}	–	tum	tum'nē	tum	tumhē̃	tumhārā^{*}	āp–
Awadhi	tū, tui (toi), taĩ (tãy)	–	tu(h)i	–	tōr^{*}	āpu̥	tum	–	tum	tumai, tohaĩ (tohãy)	tumār^{*}/tohār^{*}	āp–
(Substitute or other forms in Awadhi)	–	–	tō	tui'kā, tō'kā (tõh'kā)	–		–	–	–	tum'kā	-	-

Notes:

^*indicates a form inflectable for gender and number :
1. mor → mōrā (masculine), mōrī (feminine), mōrē (plural)
2. hamār → hamrā (masc.), hamrī (fem.), hamrē (pl.)
3. tōr→ torā (masc.), torī (fem.), torē (pl.)
4. tumar→ tumrā (masc.), tumrī (fem.), tumrē (pl.)
5. tohār→ tohrā (masc.), tohrī (fem.), tohrē (pl.)

== Word formation ==
Following are the morphological processes of stem formation in the Awadhi language:

Affixation

An affix is used to alter the meaning or form of a word. It can be either a prefix or a suffix.

- Example: Prefix bē– preceding the root saram means "shameless" while apna followed by –pan means "belonging-ness".

Compounding

Two or more stems are combined to form one stem.

- Example: nīlkanṭh means "blue bird" and banmānus means "forest man" or "chimpanzee".

Reduplication

This process involves the repetition of certain forms. It may be complete, partial, or interrupted.

1. Complete reduplication: It denotes continuity of action.
  - Example: jāt-jāt for "going on".
2. Partial reduplication: It denotes similarity of one object to other.
  - Example: hãpaṭ-dãpaṭ for "panting".
3. Interrupted reduplication: It stresses on the instant condition of the action that follows and expresses abundance of something.
  - Example: khētaī khēt "between the fields"; garmaī garam "the very hot".

== In popular culture ==
=== Entertainment ===
The 1961 film Gunga Jumna features Awadhi being spoken by the characters in a neutralised form. Gabbar Singh's speech in the 1975 film Sholay was a mix of Khariboli and Awadhi, inspired by Dilip Kumar's dacoit character Gunga from Gunga Jumna. In the 2001 film Lagaan, a neutralised form of Awadhi language was used to make it understandable to audiences. The 2009 film Dev.D features an Awadhi song, "Paayaliya", composed by Amit Trivedi. In the television series Yudh, Amitabh Bachchan spoke parts of his dialogue in Awadhi, which received critical acclaim from the Hindustan Times. Awadhi is also spoken by the residents of Ayodhya and other minor characters in Ramanand Sagar's 1987 television series Ramayan. The lyrics of the song "Rang Barse Bhige Chunar Wali", from the movie Silsila starring Amitabh Bachchan and Rekha, are in Awadhi dialect. Hrithik Roshan's character Vedha Betal in the 2022 Hindi feature film Vikram Vedha also featured him speaking in the Awadhi dialect.

The Awadhi folk song "Mere Angne Mein Tumhara Kya Kaam Hai" has become popular in Bollywood with a neutralised version of it being in the 1981 film Laawaris starring Amitabh Bachchan, as well as being in the 1970 film Bombay Talkie and the 1975 film Maze Le Lo, it was also released as a single by Neha Kakkar in 2020. Another Awadhi folk song that became popular through Bollywood was "Holi Khele Raghuveera", which was neutralised and sung by Amitabh Bachchan and put into the 2003 film Baghban starring Amitabh Bachchan and Hema Malini.

The 1982 Hindi film Nadiya Ke Paar features mixed Hindi, Awadhi and Bhojpuri dialogue and was remade in 1994 as Hum Aapke Hain Koun..!

=== Folk ===
The genres of folklore sung in Awadh include Sariya, Byaah, Suhag, Gaari, Nakta, Banraa (Banna-Banni), Alha, Sawan, Jhula, Hori and Barahmasa.

== Sample phrases ==
=== Universal Declaration of Human Rights ===
The following text is Article 1 of the Universal Declaration of Human Rights, written in Awadhi:

==== Awadhi in Devanagari Script ====
अनुच्छेद १ - सब मनइन कां गउरव औ अधिकारन के मामिला मां जनमजात आजादी औ बरोबरी मिली बा। वन्हैं बुद्धी औ अन्तरात्मा कै देन मिली बा औ आपस मां यक दुसरे के साथे भाईचारा के भाव से बरताव करै कां चाही।

==== Awadhi in Kaithi Script ====
𑂃𑂢𑂳𑂒𑂹𑂓𑂵𑂠 १ - 𑂮𑂥 𑂧𑂢𑂅𑂢 𑂍𑂰𑂁 𑂏𑂇𑂩𑂫 𑂌 𑂃𑂡𑂱𑂍𑂰𑂩𑂢 𑂍𑂵 𑂧𑂰𑂧𑂱𑂪𑂰 𑂧𑂰𑂁 𑂔𑂢𑂧𑂔𑂰𑂞 𑂄𑂔𑂰𑂠𑂲 𑂌 𑂥𑂩𑂷𑂥𑂩𑂲 𑂧𑂱𑂪𑂲 𑂥𑂰𑃀 𑂫𑂢𑂹𑂯𑂶𑂁 𑂥𑂳𑂠𑂹𑂡𑂲 𑂌 𑂃𑂢𑂹𑂞𑂩𑂰𑂞𑂹𑂧𑂰 𑂍𑂶 𑂠𑂵𑂢 𑂧𑂱𑂪𑂲 𑂥𑂰 𑂌 𑂄𑂣𑂮 𑂧𑂰𑂁 𑂨𑂍 𑂠𑂳𑂮𑂩𑂵 𑂍𑂵 𑂮𑂰𑂟𑂵 𑂦𑂰𑂆𑂒𑂰𑂩𑂰 𑂍𑂵 𑂦𑂰𑂫 𑂮𑂵 𑂥𑂩𑂞𑂰𑂫 𑂍𑂩𑂶 𑂍𑂰𑂁 𑂒𑂰𑂯𑂲 𑃀

==== Romanisation ====
anucchēda 1 - saba mana:ina kāṁ ga:urava au adhikārana kē māmilā māṁ janamajāta ājādī au barōbarī milī bā. vanhaiṁ buddhī au antarātmā kai dēna milī bā au āpasa māṁ yaka dusarē kē sāthē bhāīcārā kē bhāva sē baratāva karai kāṁ cāhī.

==== Translation ====
Article 1: All human beings are born free and equal in dignity and rights. They are endowed with reason and conscience and should act towards one another in a spirit of brotherhood.

=== Dialect Variations ===
The Awadhi language comes with its dialectal variations. For instance, in western regions, the auxiliary /hʌiː/ is used, while in central and eastern parts /ʌhʌiː/ is used.

The following examples were taken from Baburam Saxena's Evolution of Awadhi, and alternative versions are also provided to show dialectal variations.

English	Awadhi (IPA)	Awadhi (Devanagari)
Who were there?	ɦʊãː koː (kəʊn) ɾəɦəĩ	हुआँ को (कउन) रहें?
Who were there?	alt. ɦʊãː keː/kəʊn ɾəɦəin	alt. हुआँ के/कउन रहेन?
This boy is fine in seeing and hearing.	ɪʊ lʌɾɪkaː d̪eːkʰʌiː sʊnʌiː mə ʈʰiːk hʌiː	इउ लरिका देखई सुनई म ठीक है।
This boy is fine in seeing and hearing.	alt. ɪ lʌɾɪkaː d̪eːkʰʌiː sʊnʌiː mə ʈʰiːk ʌhʌiː	alt. इ लरिका देखई सुनई म ठीक अहै।
(She) said, let (me) eat a little and give a little to this one too.	kʌɦɪn laːoː t̪ʰoːɽaː kʰaːɪ leːiː t̪ʰoːɽaː jʌhu kɘ d̪ʌɪ d̪eːiː	कहिन, लाओ थोड़ा खाई लेई, थोड़ा यहु का दै देई।
(She) said, let (me) eat a little and give a little to this one too.	alt. kʌɦɪn lyaːvː t̪ʰoːɽaː kʰaːɪ leːiː raːçi keː jʌnhu kɘ d̪ʌɪ d̪eːiː	alt. कहिन, ल्याव थोड़ा खाई लेई, रचि के एन्हुं के दै देई।
Those who go will be beaten.	d͡ʒoː d͡ʒʌɪɦʌĩ soː maːrʊ̥ kʰʌɪɦʌĩ	जो जइहैं सो मारउ खइहैं।
Those who go will be beaten.	alt. d͡ʒèː d͡ʒʌɪɦʌĩ soː maːr kʰʌɪɦʌĩ	alt. जे जइहैं सो मार खइहैं।
Do not shoot at the birds.	cɪɾʌɪjʌn pʌɾ chʌrːaː nə cʌlaːoː	चिरइयन पर छर्रा न चलाओ।
Do not shoot at the birds.	alt. cɪɾʌɪjʌn peː chʌrːaː jin cʌlaːwː	alt. चिरइयन पे छर्रा जिन चलाव।

== See also ==
- Awadh
- Bagheli language
- Fijian Hindustani
- Caribbean Hindustani
- Gangapari
