= Madhumalati =

16th-century Sufi poem from India

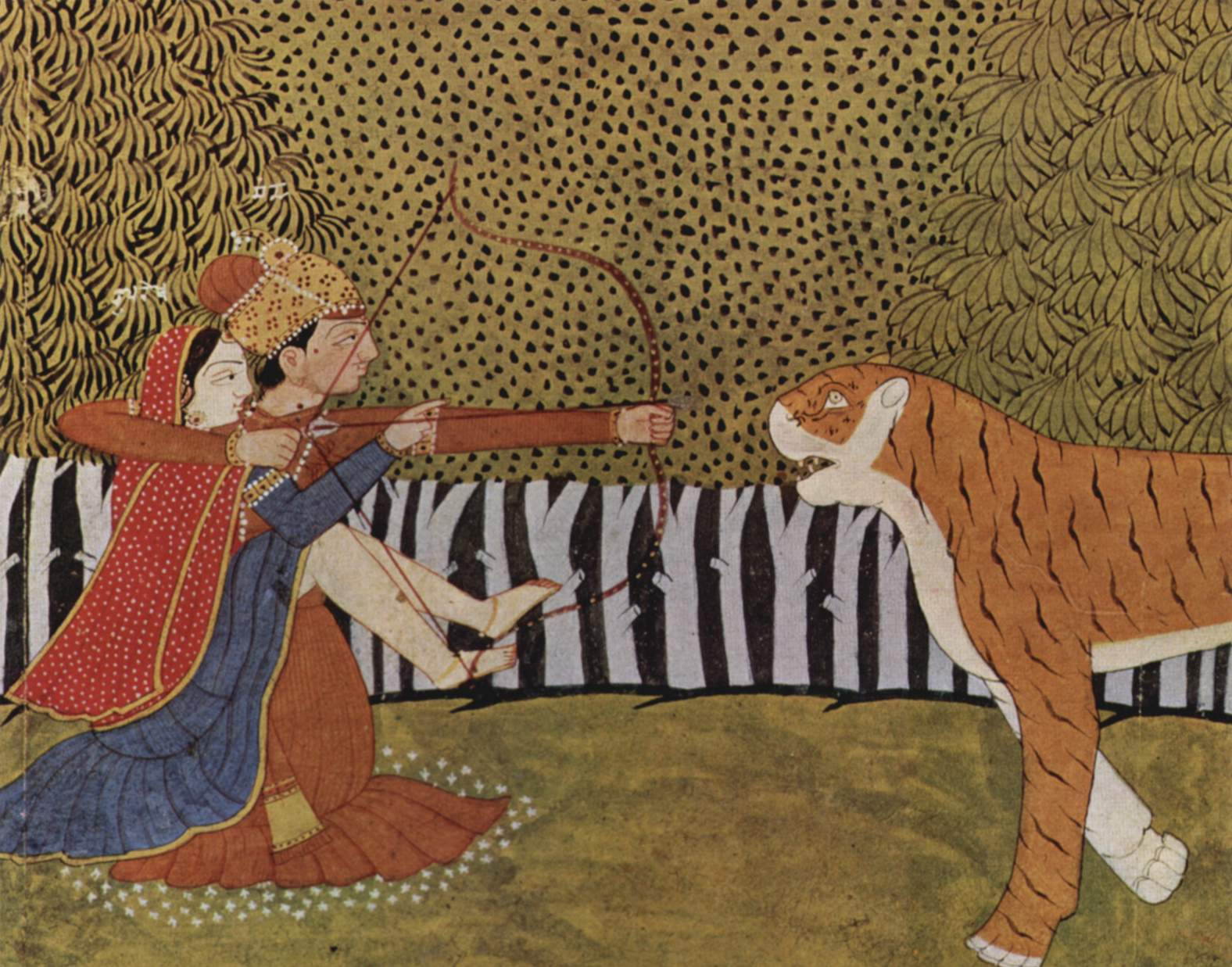
Lovers shoot at a tiger in the jungle. Illustration to the mystical Sufi text Madhumalati.

"Madhumalati" or 'night flowering jasmine' is an Indian Sufi love poem, written in 1545 by Mir Sayyid Manjhan Shattari Rajgiri. The poem is written in Awadhi dialect.

== See also ==
- "Gulshan-i 'Ishq", a 1657 Sufi poem by Nusrati based on Madhumalati
