= Sabal Singh Chauhan =

Kavi Sabal Singh Chauhan (Hindi: सबलसिंह चौहान), was a late 17th- and early 18th-century Awadhi Hindi poet revered for composing the first complete version of the Mahabharata in Hindi verse in the tradition of Doha-Chaupai tradition, a meter of couplets and quatrains similar to that used by Tulsidas's in his Ramcharitmanas in the previous century.

Kavi Sabal Singh wrote primarily during the reign of the Mughal Emperor Aurangzeb. According to his work, he recited his poetry at the Imperial court through his patron Raja Mitrasen, historical consensus leans towards Mitrasen being a landowner (Zamindar) from Etawah district in present-day Uttar Pradesh.
