= Sikandar Adil Shah =

Sultan of Bijapur from 1672 to 1686

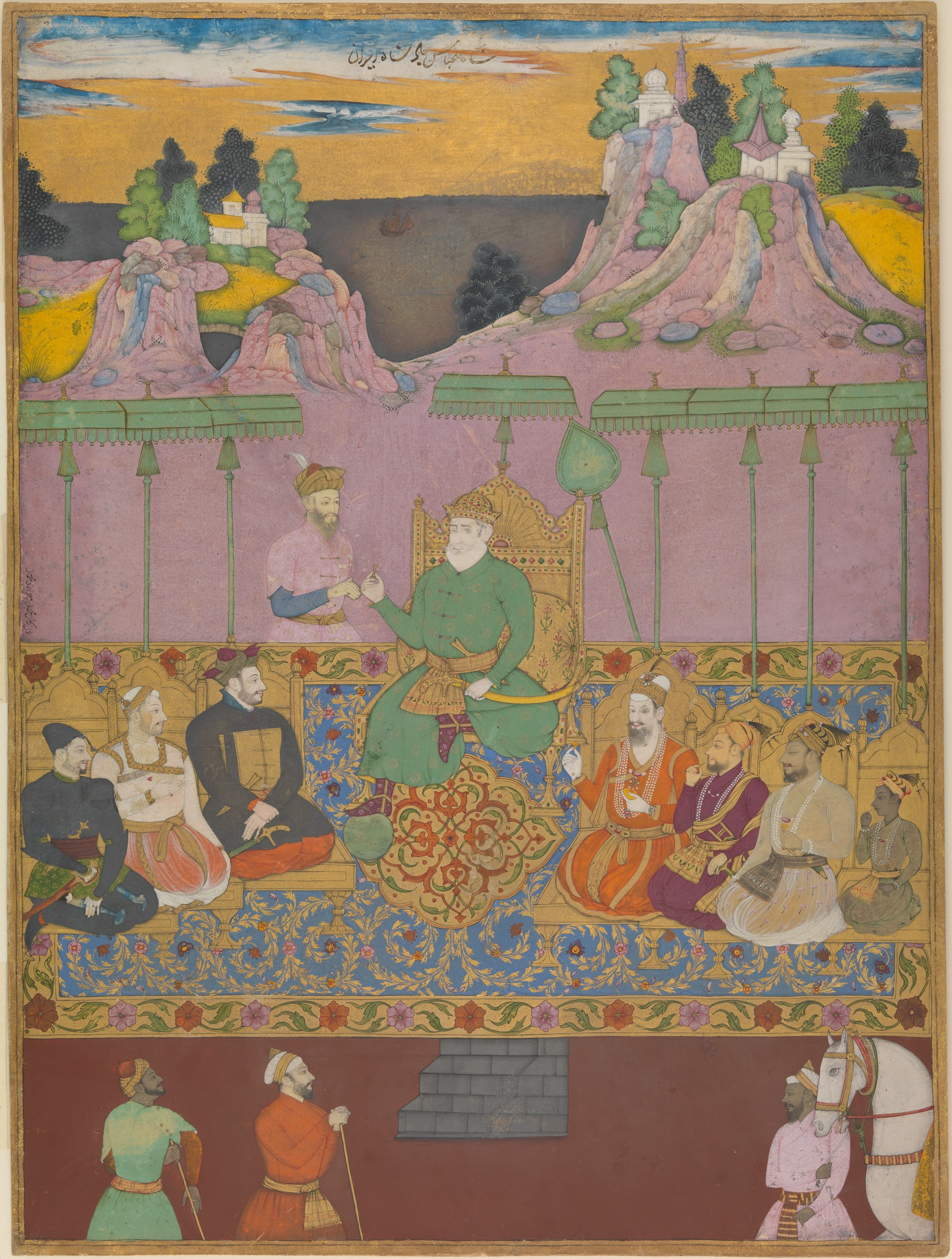
- A painting of "The House of Bijapur" was completed in the year 1680, during the reign of Sikandar Adil Shah the last ruler of the Adil Shahi dynasty.

9th Sultan of Bijapur
- Reign: 24 November 1672 – 26 September 1686
- Predecessor: Ali Adil Shah II
- Successor: Position abolished; Bijapur annexed by Mughal Empire
- Born: c.1668
- Died: 3 April 1700 (aged 31–32); Daulatabad Fort
- Burial: Sikandar Bag
- Spouse: Daughter of Abul Hasan Qutb Shah
- Issue: One son Sultan Muhammad and a daughter
Names
- Sultan Sikandar Qadari
- House: Adil Shahi
- Dynasty: Adil Shahi
- Father: Ali Adil Shah II
- Mother: Khursheeda Khanum
- Religion: Sunni Islam

Sikandar Adil Shah (1668 – 3 April 1700) was the last Sultan of Bijapur, who reigned between 1672 and 1686. Placed on the throne at five years of age, his reign was marked by the collapse of the Bijapur Sultanate.

His reign ended when the Mughal Emperor Aurangzeb annexed the city of Bijapur, putting an end to the Adil Shahi dynasty. The Sultan was captured and imprisoned at the Daulatabad Fort, where he died in 1700.

== Reign ==
He was placed on the throne of Bijapur in 1672 at five years of age. Therefore, his reign (1672–1686) is one of regents and ministers and was marked by chronic civil war among factious nobles, independence of provincial governors, paralysis of the central administration, Mughal invasions, secret alliances but pretend hostilities with the Maratha Empire and other neighbors, and the final absorption of Bijapur into the Mughal Empire in 1686.

The prestige of Bijapur was so seriously damaged by internal disruptions that the Mughal General Diler Khan almost coerced and humiliated Sikandar. Despite several sacrifices and desperate attempts on the part of Sikandar, he could not satisfy the growing greed of the Mughals. Sikandar's alliance with Sambhaji (who was Hindu) further aggravated Mughal-Bijapur relations.

=== Siege of Bijapur ===
At last, Emperor Aurangzeb himself marched out in 1685 with a large army to fulfill the ambition of his life. After desperately defending his capital and withstanding the prolonged siege of Bijapur in 1685–1686, Sikandar was unable to halt the Mughal assault led by Aurangzeb. On 12 September 1686, Bijapur was occupied, its garrison surrendered and Bijapur Fort was annexed by the Mughal Empire.

Sikandar Adil Shah was captured bound in silver chains and brought before the Mughal Emperor Aurangzeb, to whom he bowed three times. Aurangzeb then sent him and his followers to Daulatabad fort, where he died during captivity. Sikandar Adil Shah was eventually buried at foot side of his spiritual teacher Naimullah Hashmi in the open yard in the New Market Place of Bijapur. The Adil Shahi dynasty thus came to an end.

Preceded by Ali Adil Shah II	Adil Shahi Rulers of Bijapur; 1672–1686	Succeeded by Aurangzeb captured Bijapur
