= Ali Adil Shah II =

Sultan of Bijapur from 1656 to 1672

- Sultan; Shah
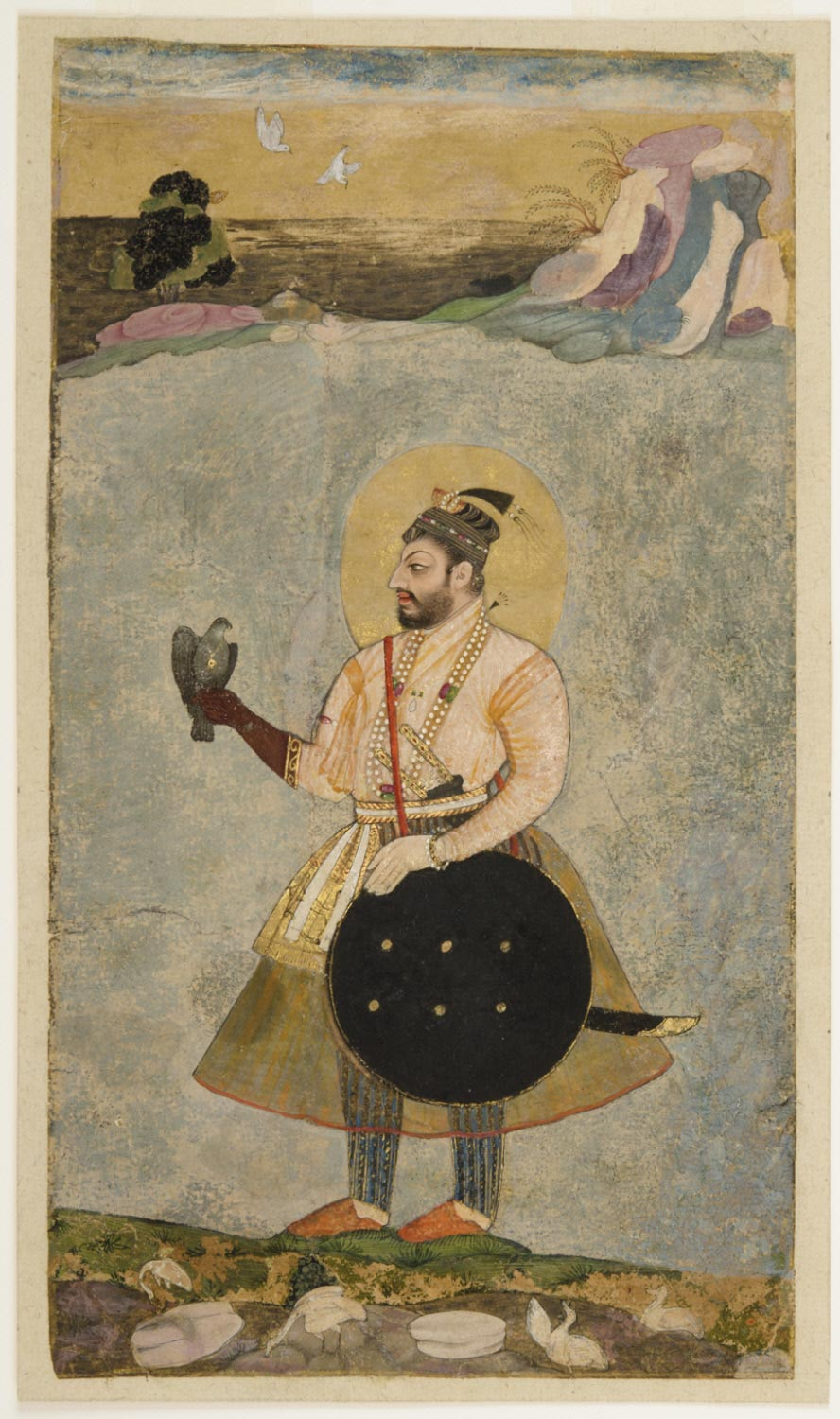

8th Sultan of Bijapur
- Reign: 4 November 1656 – 24 November 1672
- Predecessor: Mohammed Adil Shah
- Successor: Sikandar Adil Shah
- Died: 24 November 1672; Bijapur
- Burial: Bara Kaman
- Spouse: Khurshida Khanum
- Issue: Shahar Banu Begum (Padshah Bibi); Husain; Sikandar Adil Shah
Names
- Sultan Adil Shah Sani
- House: Adil Shahi house
- Dynasty: Adil Shahi Empire
- Father: Mohammed Adil Shah
- Mother: Khadija Sultana of Golconda
- Religion: Sunni Islam

Ali Adil Shah II (Urdu: علی عادل شاه دوم, romanized: ʿAlī ʿĀdil Shāh; died 24 November 1672) was the 8th Sultan of Bijapur. He succeeded to the throne of Bijapur through the efforts of the Prime Minister Khan Muhammad and the Queen, Badi Sahiba, sister of Qutb Shah of Golkonda on the death of Mohammed Adil Shah of Bijapur on 4 November 1656.

His accession signaled disasters to the Kingdom and his reign marked the decline of the Bijapur Kingdom.

== Reign ==
Shah Jahan, anxious to annex Bijapur to his empire, found a pretext in the legitimacy of Ali's parents. On Aurangzeb’s plea, Shah Jahan sanctioned the invasion of Bijapur and gave him a free hand to deal with the situation. This sanction of such a war was wholly unrighteous. Bijapur was not a vassal state of the Mughals, but an independent and equal ally of the Mughal Emperor, and the latter had no lawful right to confirm or question the succession to the Bijapur Sultanate. However, Aurangzeb had to raise the siege and rush north for the war of succession to the Mughal throne.

With Muhammad's death and Ali's accession, disorder had begun in the Karnataka. The Nayaks tried to recover their former lands. (Bangalore, the capital of Karnataka, was Bijapur's administrative headquarters for controlling these feudatories by Kempegouda.) Meanwhile, Shivaji increased the momentum of acquiring more and more Bijapur territory and carved an independent Maratha state, while his diplomacy prevented any Mughal-Bijapur coalition against him.

At the court, things were even worse. With the coming of a young and weak ruler, the party factions and struggle for supremacy was at its zenith. To aggravate them, Aurangzeb intrigued with Bijapur nobles and succeeded in winning over most of them.

Throughout his reign of 16 years, Ali struggled desperately both against the Mughals and the Marathas. He thrice repulsed Mughal invasions. But when he died in 1672, the Bijapur kingdom was deprived of most of its important territorial possessions. With the expansion of Shivaji’s kingdom, there was a corresponding shrinkage in the Bijapur territory.

== Literary activity ==
The reign of ʿAlī ʿĀdil Shāh II was marked by developments in Persian and Deccani literature and fine arts. Nusrati served as his poet-laureate. A history known as the Taʾrīkh-i ʿAlī ʿĀdil Shāh by Nūrullāh ibn Qāḍī Sayyid ʿAlī Muḥammad al-Ḥusaynī al-Qadirī was also produced under his patronage.

== Tomb ==
ʿAlī ʿĀdil Shāh II was buried in Ali Ka Rouza, the well-known Bara Kaman in Bijapur.

== Popular culture ==
=== Films and television ===
- In the 2026 Indian Marathi-language historical film Raja Shivaji, he is portrayed by Lavish Chauhan.

== See also ==
- Adil Shahi–Portuguese conflicts

== Bibliography ==
- Dehlavi, Basheeruddin: Wāqīyāt-i mamlakat-i Bījāpūr, Bangalore (Karnatak Urdu Academy) 2003.
- Firishta, Muḥammad Qāsim Hindū-Shāh Astarābādī: History of the Rise of the Mahomedan Power in India, till the Year 1612, translated by John Briggs, Calcutta (Editions Indian) 1829, rep. 1966.
- Nayeem, Muhammad: External Relations of the Bijapur Kingdom, Hyderabad A.P. (Bright Publishers) 1974.
- Verma, Dinesh Chandra: Social, economic, and cultural history of Bijapur, Delhi (Idarah-i Adabiyat-i Delli) 1990.

| Preceded by Mohammed Adil Shah | Adil Shahi Rulers of Bijapur; 1656–1672 | Succeeded by Sikandar Adil Shah |
