= Khalilli =

Khalilli, Khalli, Khayli, Khalilly, Khalily or Xəlilli and Xalilli may refer to:

- Khalilli, Kurdamir, Azerbaijan
- Qubaxəlilli, Azerbaijan
- Xəlilli, Agsu, Azerbaijan
- Xəlilli, Davachi, Azerbaijan
- Xəlilli, Ismailli, Azerbaijan
- Xəlilli, Jalilabad, Azerbaijan
- Xəlilli, Nakhchivan, Azerbaijan

== See also ==
- Khalili (disambiguation)
