= Halil =

Halil is a common Turkish, Albanian and Bosnian masculine given name. It is equivalent to the Arabic given name and surname Khalil.

Notable persons with the name include:

- Halil Akbunar (born 1993), Turkish footballer
- Halil Akkaş (born 1983), Turkish middle distance runner
- Halil Akıncı (born 1945), Turkish diplomat
- Halil Altındere (born 1971), Turkish artist
- Halil Altıntop (born 1982), Turkish footballer
- Halil Asani (born 1974), Serbian footballer
- Halil Bajramović (born 1971), Bosnian businessman
- Halil Berktay (born 1947), Turkish historian
- Halil Sami Bey (1866–1925), Ottoman Army colonel
- Halil Bıçakçı (1926-1989), Turkish football manager
- Halil Çolak (born 1988), Turkish footballer
- Halil Dervişoğlu (born 1999), Dutch footballer of Turkish descent
- Halil Sezai Erkut (1908–1988), Turkish government minister and politician
- Halil Ergün (born 1946), Turkish actor
- Halil Gür (born 1951), Dutch author of Turkish origin
- Halil Güven (born 1956), American professor and university administrator of Turkish Cypriot descent
- Halil İbrahim Eren (born 1956), Turkish footballer
- Halil İnalcık (1916-2016), Turkish historian
- Halil Jaganjac (born 1998), Croatian handball player
- Halil Jaçellari (1940–2009), Albanian writer and translator
- Halil Kanacević (born 1991), American-born Montenegrin basketball player
- Halil Kaya (1920–2000), Turkish Olympic sport wrestler
- Halil Kut (1881–1957), Ottoman-born Turkish regional governor, military commander and genocide perpetrator
- Halil Köse (born 1997), Belgian-born Turkish footballer
- Halil Menteşe (1874–1948), Turkish government minister, politician and genocide perpetrator
- Halil Suleyman Ozerden (born 1966), American lawyer and judge
- Halil Pasha (disambiguation), several people
- Halil Mete Soner, Turkish-American mathematician and academic
- Halil Mutlu (born 1973), Bulgarian-Turkish Olympic weightlifter
- Halil Mutlu (politics) (born 1971), Turkish-born physician, political lobbyist and community activist living in the USA
- Halil Mëniku (died 1967), Albanian politician and publisher
- Halil Özdemir (born 2005), Turkish footballer
- Halil Savda (born 1974), Turkish conscientious objector
- Halil Savran (born 1985), Turkish-German footballer
- Halil Tikveša (born 1935), Bosnian painter
- Halil Uysal (1973–2008), Turkish journalist and film director
- Halil Yeral (born 2000), Turkish footballer
- Halil Zeybek (born 1985), Turkish footballer
- Halil Zorba (born 1988), British weightlifter
- Halil Zıraman (1927–1984), Turkish javelin thrower
- Halil Çolak (born 1988), Turkish footballer
- Halil Ürün (born 1968), Turkish politician
- Halil İnalcık (1916–2016), Turkish historian

== See also ==
- Halili (name)
- Halil (musical instrument)
- Halil (Bernstein)
- Khalil (disambiguation)
- Khalil (name)
