= Xelîl =

Xelîl is a Kurdish name and surname, equivalent to the Arabic Khalil and its variants Khaleel, Khelil etc.

Xelîl may refer to:

== Persons ==
Given name

- Xelîl Duhokî (born 1951), also known as Khalil Duhoki, Iraqi-Kurdish writer, poet residing in Sweden
- Xelîl Cindî Reşo (born 1952), also known as Khalil Rashow, Yazidi-Kurdish academic, writer and researcher

Surname

- Têmûrê Xelîl (born 1949), Kurdish journalist, writer and translator

== See also ==
- Khalil (disambiguation)
- Khalil (name)
- Halil (disambiguation)
