= Al-Khalil (disambiguation) =

Al-Khalil is the Arabic name given to the Palestinian city of Hebron, located on the West Bank of the Jordan River. One of the oldest cities in the Levant, containing the Tomb of the Patriarchs.

Al-Khalil may also refer to:

== People ==
- Al-Khalil ibn Ahmad al-Farahidi (718 – 786), lexicographer and leading grammarian of Basra, Iraq
- Al-Khalil family

== See also ==
- Khalil (disambiguation)
- Khalili (disambiguation)
