= Ottoman Old Regime =

Ottoman Empire from 1703 to 1789

Sublime Ottoman State: دولت عليه عثمانیه; Devlet-i ʿAlīye-i ʿOsmānīye
- Old Regime: 1703–1789
- Flag in the Bowles's Universal Display of the Naval Flags of all Nations (1783) Tughra (official seal) of the sultan (this one belongs to Abdulhamid I)

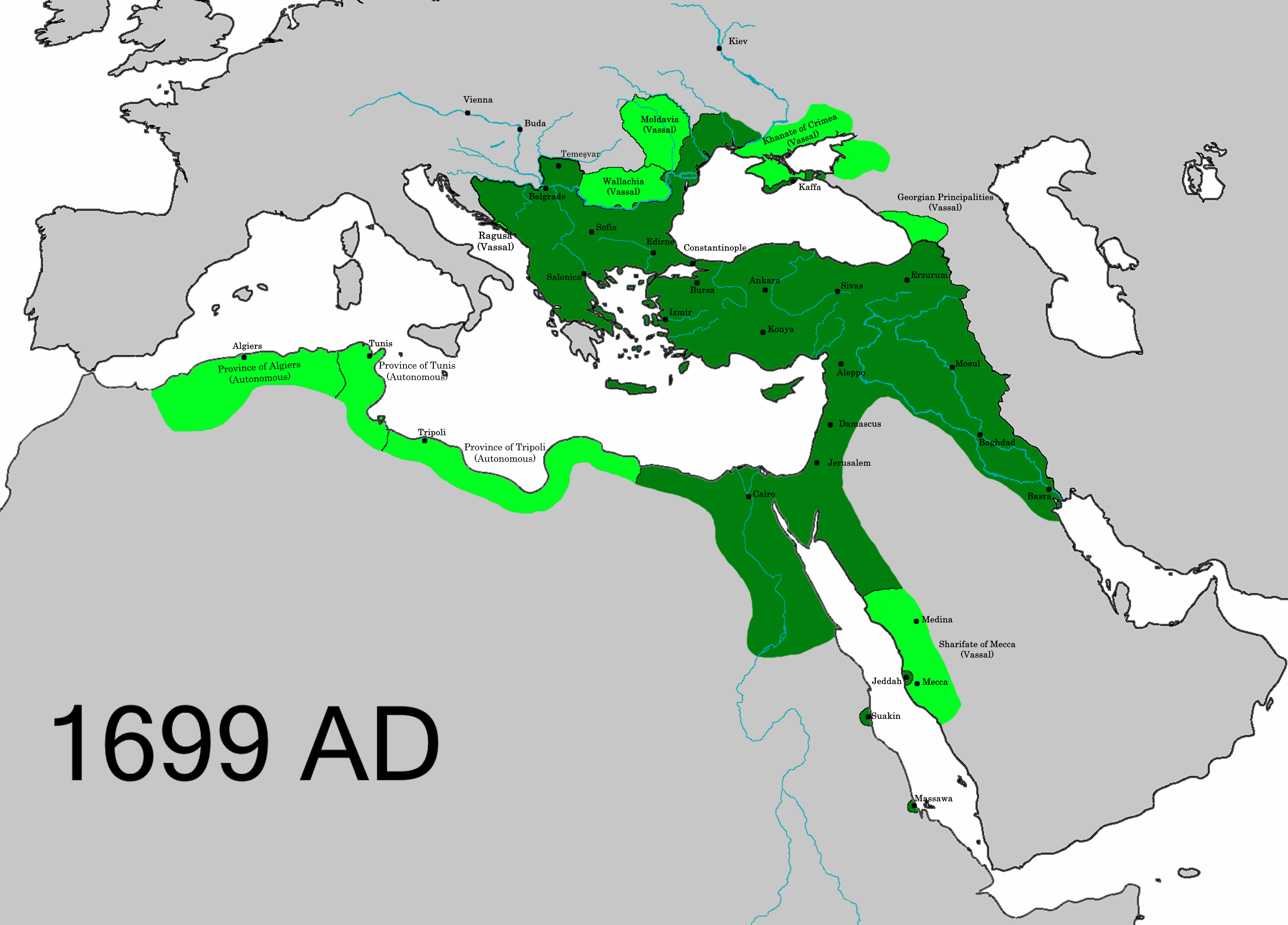
- The Ottoman Empire in 1699, following the Treaty of Karlowitz at the end of the War of the Holy League.
- Status: Empire
- Capital: Constantinople (1453–1922)
- Common languages: Ottoman Turkish; Persian; Arabic; Greek; others
- Religion: Sunni Islam (state)
- Demonym: Ottoman
- Government: Absolute monarchy & Caliphate
- Sultan
  - 1695–1703: Mustafa II
  - 1703–1730: Ahmed III
  - 1730–1754: Mahmud I
  - 1754–1757: Osman III
  - 1757–1774: Mustafa III
  - 1774–1789: Abdulhamid I
  - 1789–1807: Selim III
- Legislature: Imperial Council
- History
  - Edirne Incident: 1703
  - Tulip Era: 1718–1730
  - Reforms of Selim III: 1789
| Preceded by | Succeeded by |
| Era of Transformation | New Regime |

The history of the Ottoman Empire in the 18th century has classically been described as one of stagnation and reform. In analogy with 18th-century France, it is also known as the Ancien Régime or Old Regime, contrasting with the "New Regime" of the Nizam-i Cedid and Tanzimat in the 19th century. At the Ottoman Empire's peak it covered parts of North Africa, The Arabian Peninsula, all of modern-day Türkiye (Turkey), parts of Greece, and almost all of the Balkans.

The period characterized as one of decentralization in the Ottoman political system. Political and economic reforms enacted during the preceding War of the Holy League (1683-1699), particularly the sale of life-term tax farms (Ottoman Turkish: malikāne) instituted in 1695, enabled provincial figures to achieve an unprecedented degree of influence in Ottoman politics. This decentralization had once led historians to believe that the Ottoman Empire was in decline during this period, part of the larger and since discredited Ottoman Decline Thesis, but it is now recognized that the Ottomans were successfully able to tie emerging provincial elites politically and financially to the central government. The empire likewise experienced significant economic growth during much of the eighteenth century and was, until the disastrous war with Russia in 1768-74, also able to match its rivals in military strength. In light of this, the empire's history during this period is now generally viewed in more neutral terms, eschewing concepts such as 'decline' and 'stagnation'. The Old Regime was brought to an end not by a single dramatic event, but by the gradual process of reform begun by Sultan Selim III (r. 1789-1807), known as the Nizam-ı Cedid (New Order). Although Selim himself was deposed, his reforms were continued by his successors into the nineteenth century and utterly transformed the nature of the Ottoman Empire.

== Malikāne ==
Of crucial importance for this period in Ottoman history was the institution of malikāne, or life-term tax farm. Tax farming had been used as a method of revenue-raising throughout the seventeenth century, but contracts only began to be sold on a life-term basis in 1695, as part of the empire's wartime fiscal reforms. According to the malikāne contract, individuals could compete in auction for the right of taxation over a given revenue source, the winner of which would agree to submit his promised amount to the government each year, as well as providing a lump sum up front equal to two to three times the annual amount. This system provided the Ottoman government with a much more stable source of revenue, and they enjoyed significant budget surpluses throughout much of the eighteenth century.

However, the impact of malikāne extended far beyond its original economic and fiscal purpose. It facilitated a new style of government in the Ottoman Empire, which has been characterized as one of "decentralization". Malikāne contracts were split into shares and privately traded on an ever-expanding market, taking advantage of the growing economy of the early eighteenth century Ottoman Empire. These state assets were traded among numerous social groups, including but not limited to military and religious officials, rural gentry, urban notables, and janissaries. This provided provincial figures with new ways to interact with the Ottoman state. While in previous centuries a strict division between the military-administrative askeri class and the civilian reaya class had been at least theoretically enforced, the sale of malikāne enabled the latter group to take part in government administration. Provincial notables enjoyed the legitimacy they earned by tying themselves formally to the Ottoman state, while the Ottoman state benefited from its closer relationship with the notables, who were more effectively able to handle issues of local government and taxation.

The institution of malikāne continued largely undisturbed until 1793, when Selim III began to phase it out as part of his general reform effort, known as the New Order (Ottoman Turkish: Niẓām-ı Cedīd). As malikāne contracts expired they were transferred to the New Order treasury, and recontracted to individuals whom the state deemed reliable. This attempt at centralization was opposed by provincial figures who by then had a vested interest in the continuation of malikāne, and contributed to Selim III's overthrow in 1807. Malikāne contracts thus continued to be sold and traded until the 1840s, when they were finally eliminated as part of the empire's extensive reform effort, known as the Tanzimat.

== Government ==
=== Central administration ===
Over the course of the seventeenth century, the nature of the Ottoman Empire's government had transformed from a patrimonial system into one which was supported more by bureaucracy than by the personal authority of the sultan. The last effort of a militarily active sultan to personally control the entire government of the empire was undone in the 1703 rebellion known as the Edirne incident, in which Mustafa II was deposed. Major governmental offices were no longer located within the imperial palace, and exercised greater independent authority. By the 1790s the central bureaucracy had grown to number some 1,500-2,000 scribes, representing a significant increase over the 183 who were serving in 1593. High-ranking bureaucrats found their social mobility increased, and many of them went on to establish successful careers as provincial governors and even grand viziers, posts which in previous centuries were typically limited to men of military backgrounds.

=== Provincial administration ===
Ottoman rule in the provinces was predicated upon maintaining the loyalty of local interest groups. State authority was represented by the provincial governor (beylerbey) and the judge (kadı), the latter carrying out most of the day-to-day administration of the province. Representing local interests were figures known as "notables" (ayan). Ayan came from diverse backgrounds; what distinguished them was their entrenched local status. Unlike Ottoman state officials, they did not generally migrate from position to position across the empire, but established deep roots within a small geographical area. Ayan utilized patronage networks to wield significant influence within their local city or region, and their cooperation was essential in order for Ottoman provincial administration to function. During the eighteenth century, ayan were tied to the state through the aforementioned institution of malikāne. By purchasing malikāne, ayan were able to consolidate their control over their local region of influence, but were also linked to the state in a symbiotic relationship. Just as the Ottoman government relied on them to maintain order in the provinces, so too did they come to rely on the Ottoman government to provide them with legitimacy and continued access to malikāne revenues. Thus paradoxically, the Ottoman government both granted provincial figures a greater degree of autonomy than ever before, while also tying them more closely to the central state in a mutually beneficial relationship. The central government and provincial power-holders thus remained interdependent, and the latter did not seek independence from the Ottoman Empire.

During the seventeenth century provincial governors had been appointed for unspecified periods of time, producing a significant degree of uncertainty among them with regard to security of office. By the eighteenth century, all governors were appointed for one-year tenures, at the end of which they were subject to review and potential re-appointment. Provincial government in the Ottoman Empire was reliant upon continued cooperation between the centrally-appointed governors and local ayan. The latter played a key role in tax collection, particularly during wartime, and met in regular councils with the provincial governors or their representatives (mütesellims). Frequently, mütesellims were chosen from among the local ayan, and some families acquired the office on a hereditary basis. Particularly powerful ayan families, such as the al-Azms of Damascus, were also able to acquire governorships.

Particularly during the second half of the eighteenth century, the duties of provincial government were carried out in local councils. Although varying from region to region, major figures on such councils would include the local judge (kadı), the commander of the Janissaries, the commander of the fortress garrison (dizdar), and local ayan leaders. Meetings were held either in the residence of the kadı or the provincial governor's office.

== Military ==
The Ottoman military was capable of matching those of its European rivals during the first half of the eighteenth century, and there was no significant technological gap between them. However, following the 1739 Treaty of Belgrade, the Ottomans remained at peace in Europe for nearly thirty years, missing out on the rapid improvements in military technology and organization associated with the Seven Years' War (1756-63), particularly the development of highly trained and disciplined regimental forces, innovations in the tactical deployment of small-caliber cannons, and the widespread use of socket bayonets as a counter to cavalry. Extended peace also resulted in a lack of practical experience among Ottoman commanders, in contrast with Russian generals such as Rumiantsev and Suvorov, whose abilities were honed during the Seven Years' War. Thus when war finally broke out with Russia in 1768 the Ottomans suffered devastating defeats, resulting in the loss of Crimea and the signing of the Treaty of Küçük Kaynarca in 1774.

== Economy ==
The Ottoman economy experienced general expansion and growth during the first three quarters of the eighteenth century. The Ottoman budget grew dramatically, from 1 billion akçe in 1699 to 1.6 billion in 1748. In contrast with the previous century, the Ottomans enjoyed budget surpluses during most of these years.

Istanbul's commercial infrastructure was significantly revamped and expanded during the eighteenth century, improvements which underpinned the empire's rapidly growing international trade. The Ottoman economy particularly benefited from the export of fine textiles, handmade yarns, and leather goods.

== Social and cultural life ==
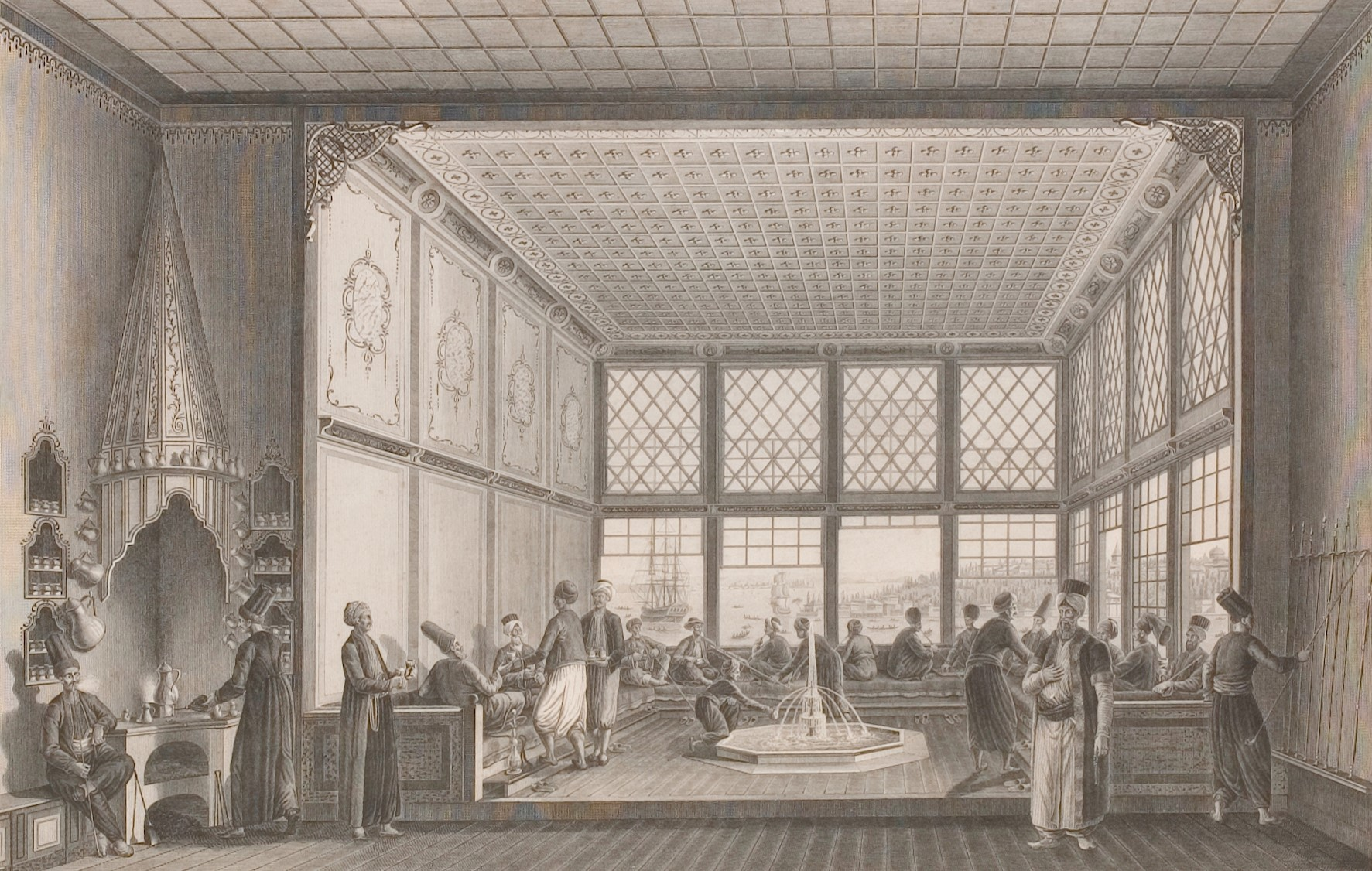
A coffeehouse in eighteenth-century Istanbul.

The eighteenth century was a time of increasing consumption and sociability among the Ottoman elite. Dozens of palaces sprang up along the shores of the Bosphorus for the rich Ottoman grandees, who used their wealth to fund Istanbul's rapid expansion. Fountains were constructed across the city, providing fresh water for a growing urban population.

In 1721 Sultan Ahmed III ordered the construction of a new summer palace near Kağıthane in Istanbul, to be named Saʿdabad ("Abode of Felicity"). Whereas Topkapı Palace enhanced the prestige of the Ottoman dynasty through seclusion, Saʿdabad was meant to serve as a stage for a much more visible and ostentatious sultanate, similar to the palace of Versailles in France.

Coffeehouses played a major role in public life, not only by providing items of consumption for the common people, but also as places where people could come together on a relatively equal basis to discuss public affairs. While the seventeenth century had witnessed some degree of backlash against the spread of coffeehouses from the state, which was concerned with their socially subversive influence, and from the ultra-conservative religious movement of the Kadızadelis, during the eighteenth century there was no longer an effort to ban them entirely. Coffeehouse culture had become an established feature of the cities and towns of the Ottoman Empire, and now the state limited itself to surveillance measures in an effort to control the unruly groups which could gather in them. Socially, they became more stratified, with different venues emerging for those of varying social ranks.

For Ottoman women, the most important venue for public sociability was the bathhouse (hamam). Lady Mary Wortley Montagu, who visited an Edirne bathhouse in 1718, stated that the bathhouse played the same role for women that the coffeehouse played for men. Large numbers of women could meet on a regular basis, where they would have opportunities to discuss public affairs. In the early eighteenth century Istanbul's water supply was significantly upgraded, allowing the number of bathhouses to multiply across the city. Bathhouses were naturally segregated by sex, but also sometimes catered to particular social classes as well.

== Intellectual life ==
The first Turkish-language printing press was established in Istanbul in 1727 by Ibrahim Müteferrika, a Hungarian convert to Islam. Both the imperial court and religious authorities recognized the value of the press, and thus approved of its use. Müteferrika's press was mainly used to disseminate historical, geographical, and linguistic works, but suffered due to low market demand for printed books in comparison with more prestigious manuscripts, eventually closing down in 1796-7.

== Political history ==
=== 1695–1703 Mustafa II ===
Although Mustafa II (1695–1703), last of campaigning sultans, won a few minor victories, he suffered a devastating loss in the Battle of Zenta by Prince Eugene of Savoy of Austria. By 1699, Ottoman Hungary had been conquered by the Austrians. The Treaty of Karlowitz was signed that year. By this treaty, Mustafa II ceded Hungary (see Ottoman Hungary) and Transylvania to Austria, Morea to the Venetian Republic and withdrew Ottoman forces from Polish Podolia. Also during this reign, Peter I of Russia (1682–1725) captured the Black Sea fortress of Azov from the Ottomans (1697). Mustafa was dethroned during the revolt named the Edirne event, which was preceded by a large-scale campaign in Georgia.

=== 1703–1730 Ahmed III ===
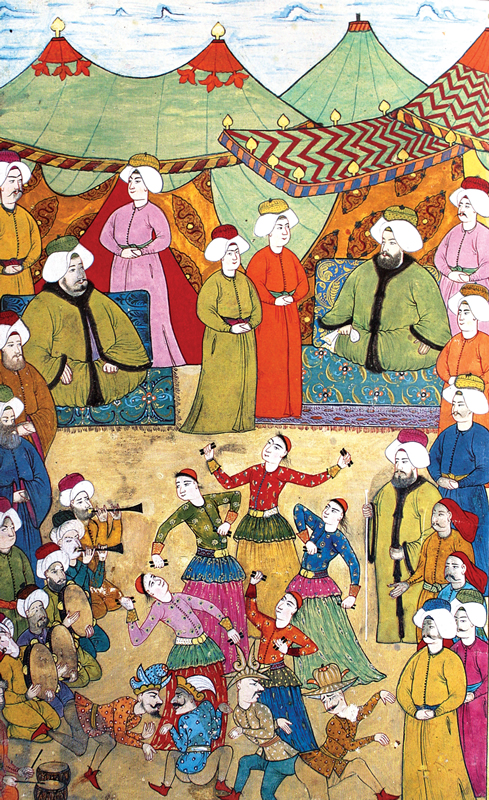
Depiction of the festivities of 1720, celebrating the circumcision of the sons of Ahmed III.

In 1710 Charles XII of Sweden convinced Sultan Ahmed III to declare war against Russia, and the Ottoman forces under Baltacı Mehmet Pasha won a major victory at the Battle of Prut. In the subsequent treaty, Russia returned Azov to the Ottomans, agreed to demolish the fortress of Taganrog and others in the area, and to stop interfering with the affairs of the Polish–Lithuanian Commonwealth or Cossacks. Discontent at the leniency of these terms was so strong in Istanbul that it nearly brought on a renewal of the war.

In 1715 Morea was taken from the Venetians. This led to hostilities with Austria, in which the Ottoman Empire had an unsuccessful outcome, and Belgrade fell into the hands of Austria in 1717. Through the mediation of England and the Netherlands the peace of Passarowitz was concluded in 1718, by which the Ottomans retained their conquests from the Venetians, but lost Banat.

During the course of the Persian war the Ottomans made successive conquests with little resistance from Persian armies, though often impeded by the nature of the country and the fierce spirit of the native tribes. After a few years, however, the war became less favourable to Ottoman ambition. The celebrated Persian military leader Nadir Konli Khan (who afterwards reconquered and conquered states for himself), gained his first renown by exploits against the enemies of Shah Tahmasp.

Most of Ahmet's reign was the sub period known as Tulip period. The period was marked by a high taste of architecture, literature and luxury as well as the first examples of industrial productions. But the social problems peaked and after the revolt of Patrona Halil Ahmet was dethroned.

=== 1730–1754 Mahmud I ===
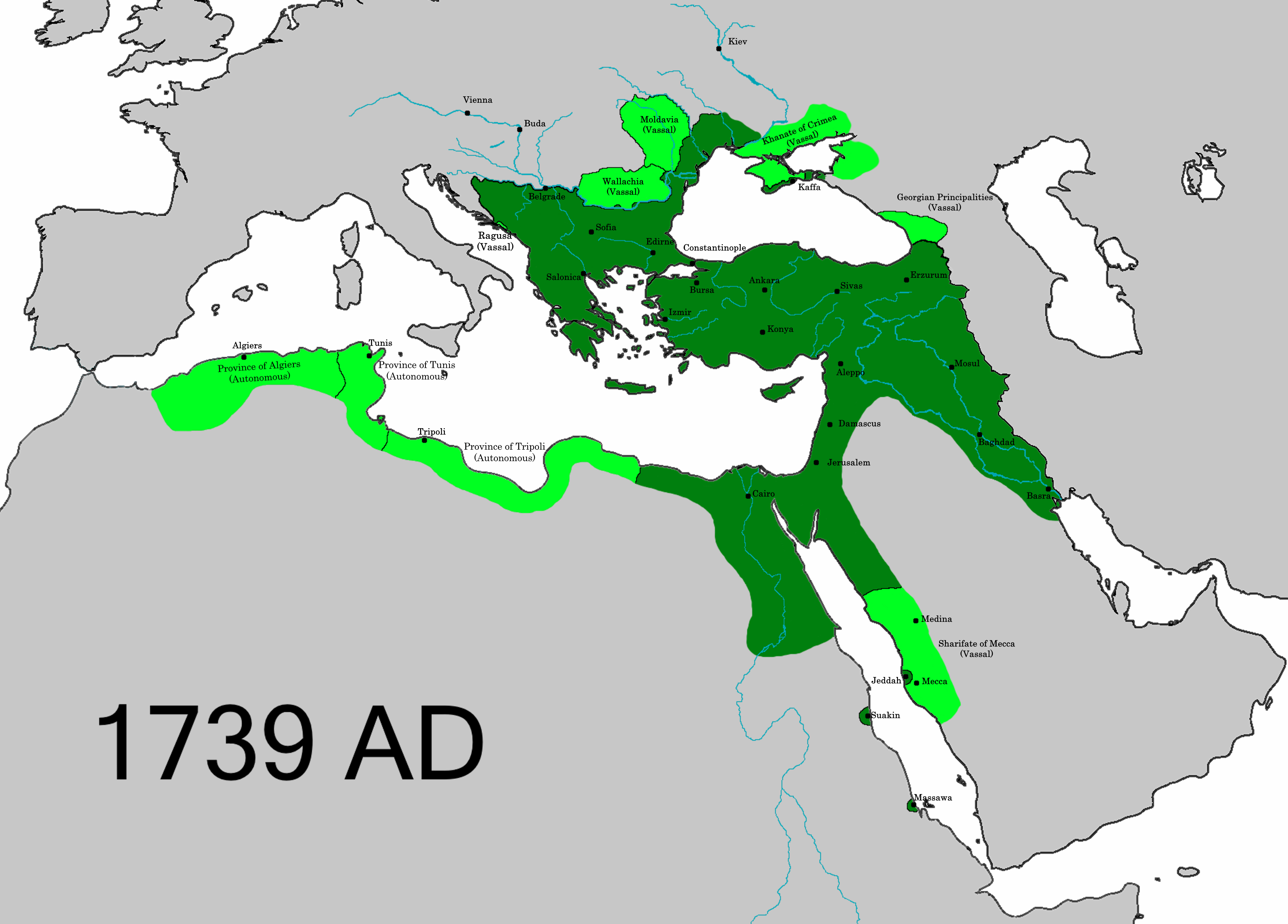
The Ottoman Empire after concluding peace with Austria and Russia in 1739. The Ottomans successfully reconquered Belgrade, but ceded Azov to Russia.

Although Mahmud was brought to the throne by the civil strife engendered by Patrona Halil, he did not espouse Halil's anti-reform agenda. In fact, much of his first year as sultan was spent in dealing with the reactionary forces unleashed by Halil. Eventually, on 24 November 1731, he was forced to execute Halil and his main followers, whereupon the rebellion ceased.

Another war erupted between the Ottomans and Russia in May 1736. Russian forces captured Azov (1736) and Ochakov (1737), but failed to take Bender and suffered immense losses from disease and logistical challenges after unsuccessfully invading the Crimea in 1738. In 1737 Austria joined the war on the Russian side, but suffered disastrous defeats against the Ottomans, particularly in the Battle of Grocka. By 1739 the Ottomans had reconquered Belgrade, forcing the Austrians to make peace. Abandoned by their allies, Russia too sued for peace, abandoning all of their conquests except for Azov.

The Persian wars saw Ottoman forces ranged against the military genius of Nadir Shah. The Ottomans managed to retain control of Baghdad, but Armenia, Azerbaijan and Georgia fell back within the Persian sphere of influence.

=== 1754–1757 Osman III ===
During Osman's reign there were several big fires in Istanbul, the capital.

=== 1757–1774 Mustafa III ===
Ever since the Patrona Halil rebellion had overthrown Ahmed III in 1730, the government had largely been dominated by the empire's Chief Black Eunuchs. Grand viziers served for very limited periods in office. This changed when Mustafa III came to the throne in 1757. The son of Ahmed III, Mustafa sought to revive his father's policy of close cooperation with the grand viziers. In November he appointed Koca Ragıp Pasha (1757-1763), one of the most capable statesmen of the century.

=== 1774–1789 Abdul Hamid I ===
In 1774 after a catastrophic war with Russia, the Ottomans were compelled to sign the Treaty of Küçük Kaynarca.

== Gallery ==
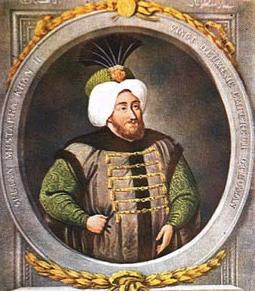
Mustafa II
(1695–1703)

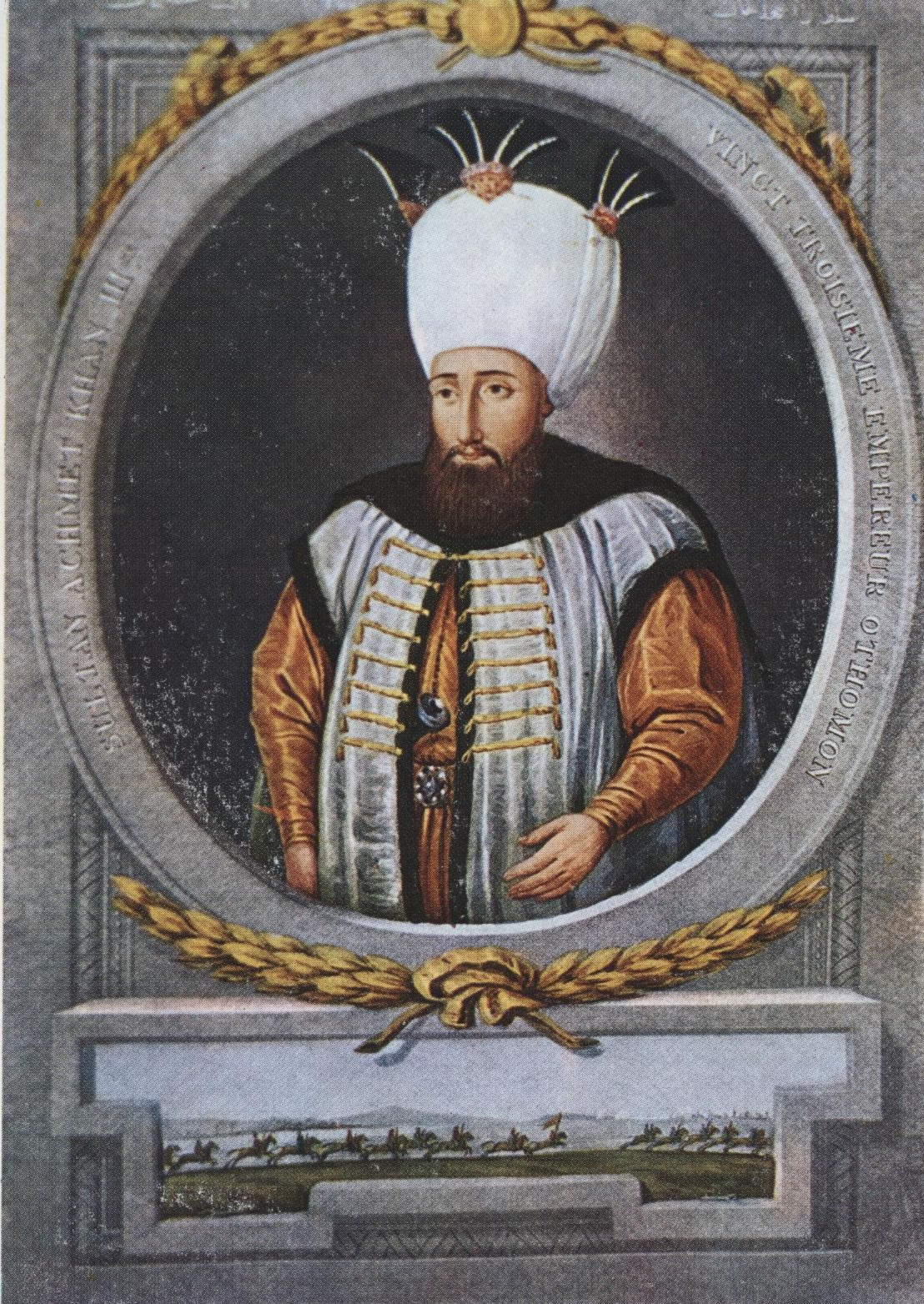
Ahmed III
(1703–1730)

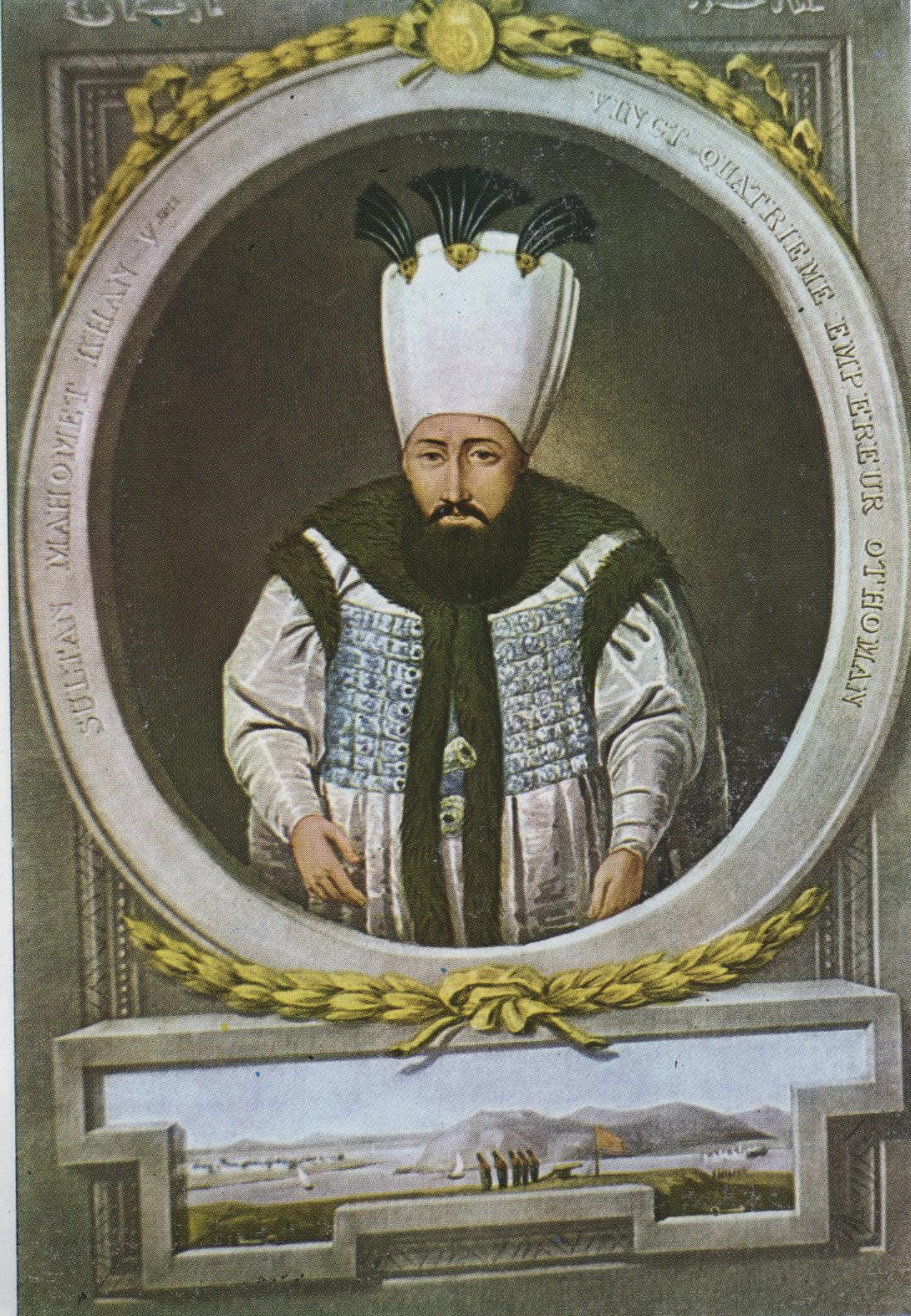
Mahmud I
(1730–1754)

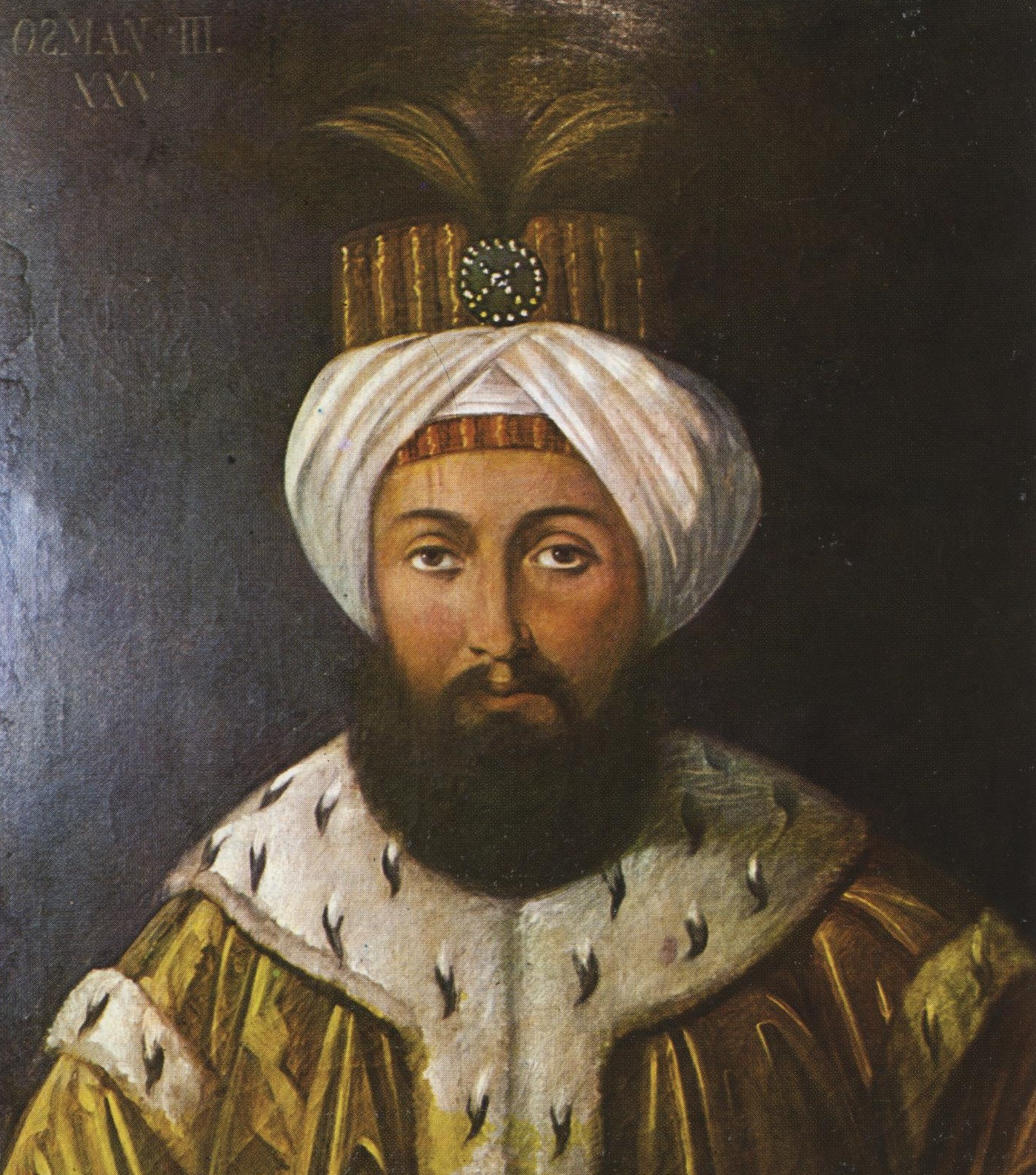
Osman III
(1754–1757)

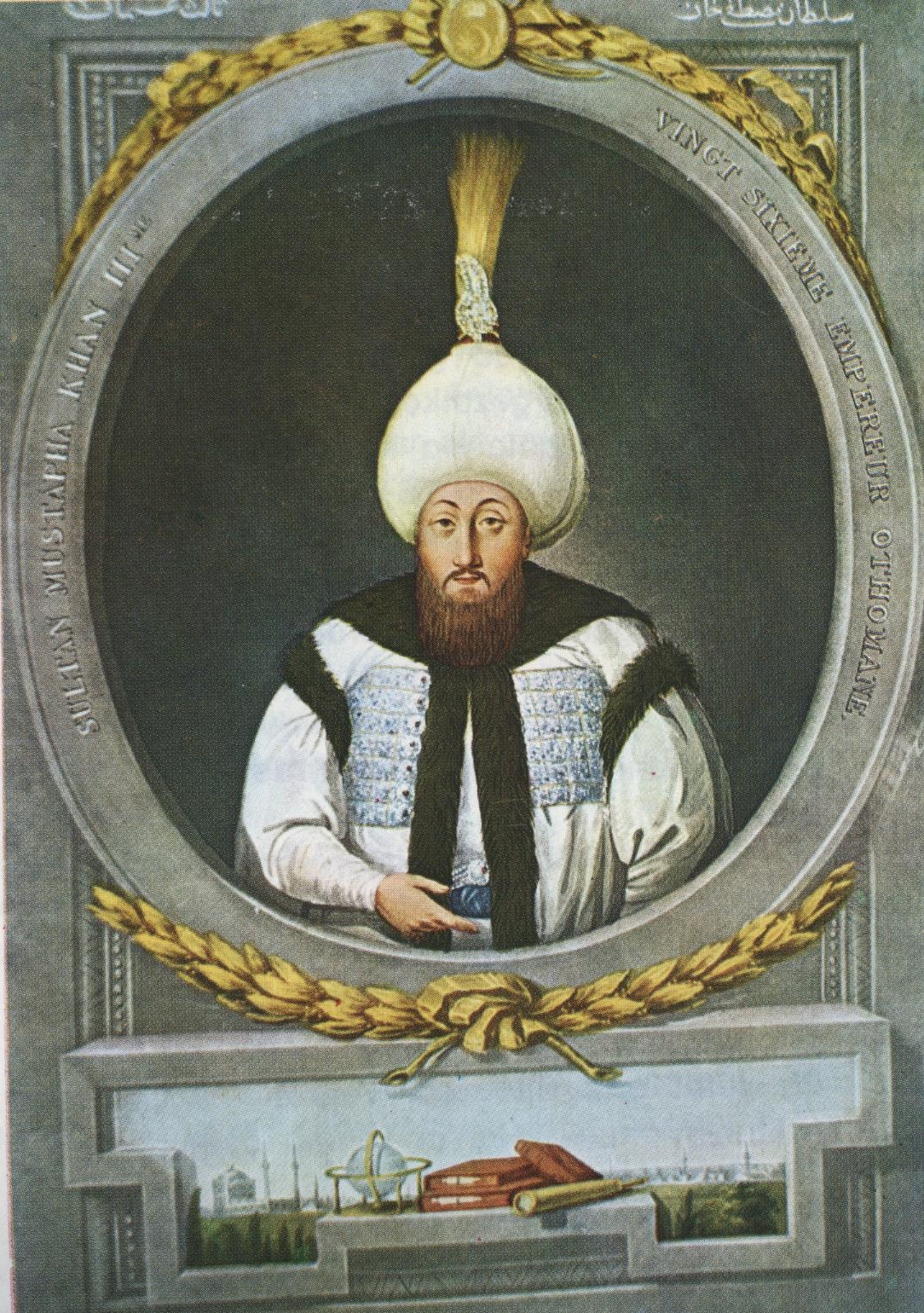
Mustafa III
(1757–1774)

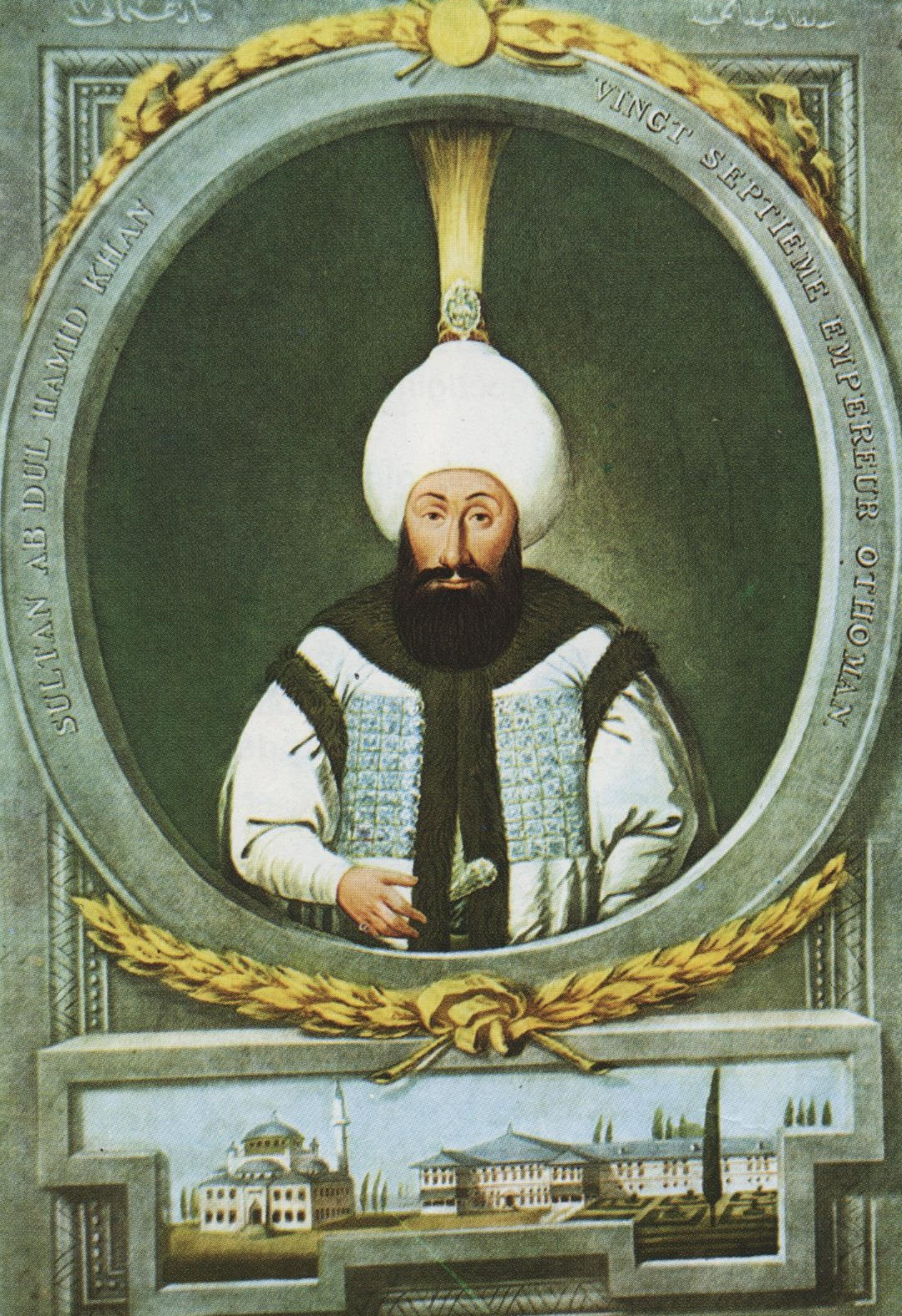
Abdulhamid I
(1774–1789)

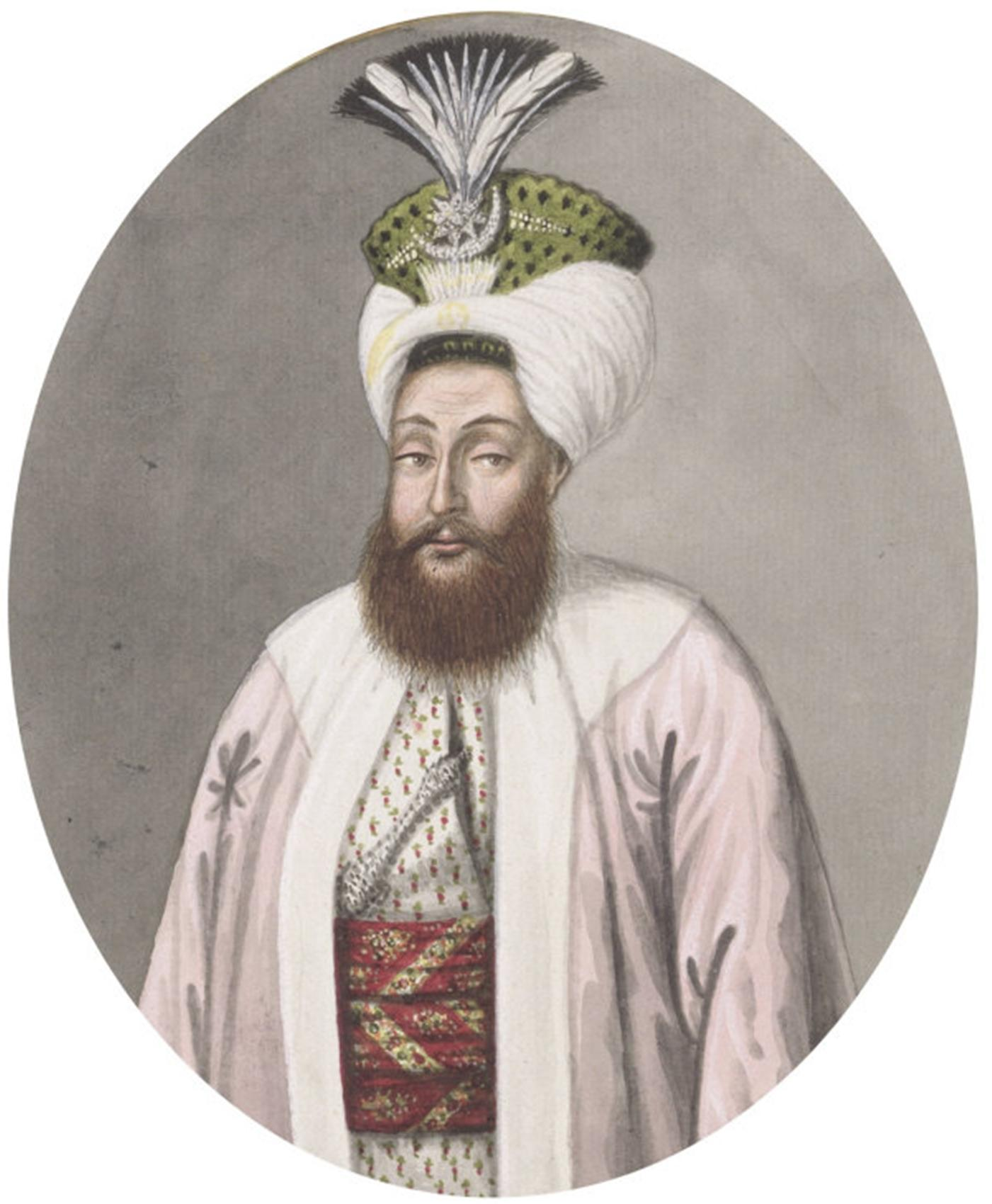
Selim III
(1789–1807)

== See also ==
- Ottoman Decline Thesis
