= Gonal, Wadgera =

Gonal
- Village
- Location within Karnataka Location within India
- Coordinates: 16°25′53″N 077°13′11″E
- Country: India
- State: Karnataka
- District: Yadgir district
- Taluka: Wadgera

Government
  - Type: Panchayati raj (India)
  - Body: Gram panchayat

Population (2001)
  - Total: 853

Languages
  - Official: Kannada
- Time zone: UTC+5:30 (IST)
- PIN: 585355
- ISO 3166 code: IN-KA
- Vehicle registration: KA 33
- Website: karnataka.gov.in

Gonal is a panchayat village in the southern state of Karnataka, India. Administratively since 2017, Gonal has been under the Wadgera Taluka of Yadgir district in Karnataka. It lies on the left (east) bank of the Krishna River. Gonal is nine kilometers by road southeast of the village of Bendebembli and thirteen kiolmeters by road southwest of the village of Badiyal. The nearest rail station is Chegunda Station and the nearest railhead is in Yadgir.

There are nine villages in the gram panchayat: Gonal, Agnihal, Gundloor, Joldhadgi, Konganda Simt Wadgera, Sangam, Shivenoor, Shivepur, and Sugoor.

== Demographics ==
As of 2001 census, Gonal had 853 inhabitants, with 415 males and 438 females.
