= Khalili =

Khalili (Arabic: خلیلي) is a common Arabic-based surname, meaning "originating from Al-Khalil also known as Hebron". It is composed of root word Khalil (meaning "companion" or "friend") plus the Arabic suffix "i" meaning "from" or "of". Khalili is also commonly used in Persian, Afghani and other Muslim surnames.

Khalili may refer to:

== Persons ==
=== Khalili ===
- Abbas Khalili, also known as Abbas al-Khalili (1896–1972), Iraqi-born Iranian diplomat, newspaper publisher
- Abdul Khalili (born 1992), full name Abdul Rahman Khalili, Swedish football player of Palestinian origin
- Anousheh Khalili (born 1983), Iranian-American singer-songwriter
- Aram Khalili (born 1989), Norwegian football player of Iranian Kurdish origin
- Sir David Khalili: see Nasser Khalili
- Fowzieh Khalili (born 1958), Indian female cricketer
- Hossein Khalili (born 1956), Iranian Air Force officer
- Imad Khalili (born 1987), Swedish football player of Palestinian origin
- Karim Khalili, Afghani politician, Vice President of Afghanistan
- Khalilullah Khalili (1907–1987), alternative spellings Khalilollah, Khalil Ullah, Afghanistan's foremost 20th century poet as well as a noted historian, university professor, diplomat and royal confidant
- Laleh Khalili, Iranian-American academic and professor in Middle Eastern Politics
- Massoud Khalili (born 1950), Afghani diplomat, linguist and urbane poet
- Mohsen Khalili (born 1981), Iranian football player
- Nader Khalili (1936–2008), Iranian-American architect, writer, and humanitarian
- Nasser Khalili, (born 1945), British-Iranian scholar, collector and philanthropist
- Said Karimulla Khalili (born 1998), Russian-Afghan biathlete
- Yasha Khalili (born 1988), Iranian football player
- Shakereh Khaleeli (1947–1991), Indian murder victim

=== Al-Khalili, or Al-Khalīlī ===
- Ahmed bin Hamad al-Khalili (born 1942), Muslim scholar, Grand Mufti of Oman
- Jim Al-Khalili (born 1962), Iraqi-born British theoretical physicist, author and broadcaster.
- Shams al-Dīn al-Khalīlī (1320–1380) a medieval Syrian astronomer

== Locations ==
=== Azerbaijan ===
For localities in Azerbaijan, see Khalilli (disambiguation)

=== Egypt ===
- Khan el-Khalili, bazaar in Cairo

=== Iran ===
- Khalili, Fars, a village in Fars Province, Iran
- Khalili, Sepidan, a village in Fars Province, Iran
- Khalili, Isfahan, a village in Isfahan Province, Iran
- Khalili, Markazi, a village in Markazi Province, Iran
- Khalili, Razavi Khorasan, a village in Razavi Khorasan Province, Iran

== See also ==
- Al-Khalil (disambiguation)
- Khalil (disambiguation)
- Khalilli (disambiguation)
