= Hayyal (B) =

Hayyal (B) Karnataka Haiyyal (B)
- Village
- Location within Karnataka Location within India
- Coordinates: 16°33′51.41″N 76°57′33.70″E
- Country: India
- State: Karnataka
- District: Yadgir district
- Taluka: Wadgera Taluka
- Gram Panchayat: Hayyal (B), Wadgera

Government
  - Type: Panchayati raj (India)
  - Body: Gram panchayat

Population (2011)
  - Total: 3,140
  - Density: 175/km^{2} (450/sq mi)

Languages
  - Official: Kannada
- Time zone: UTC+5:30 (IST)
- PIN: 585223
- Telephone code: 621174
- ISO 3166 code: IN-KA
- Vehicle registration: KA 33
- Website: karnataka.gov.in

Hayyal (B), Wadgera is a panchayat village in the southern state of Karnataka, India. Administratively since 2017, Hayyal (B) has been under the Wadgera Taluka of Yadgir district in Karnataka. It lies on the left (east) bank of the Krishna River. Hayyal (B) is 26 kilometers by road southeast of the village of Bendebembli and 23 kiolmeters by road northwest of the City of Shahapur, Karnataka.and 18 kiolmeters by road northeast of the Taluka of Wadgera Taluka.and 39 kiolmeters by road northeast of the District of Yadgir . The nearest rail station is Yadgir Station and the nearest railhead is in Yadgir.

There are three villages in the gram panchayat:Hayyal (B), Wadgera, Madarkal, and Ekchinti, Wadgera.

== Education ==
The government high school and primary school at Hayyal (B) has twice been shifted away to other locales.

== Demographics ==
At the 2011 census, Hayyal (B) had 3,140 inhabitants, with 1,540 males and 1,600 females.
