= Ekchinti, Wadgera =

- Village
- Location within Karnataka Location within India
- Coordinates: 16°32′10.25″N 76°57′20.868″E
- Country: India
- State: Karnataka
- District: Yadgir district
- Taluka: Wadgera Taluka
- Gram Panchayat: Hayyal (B), Wadgera

Government
  - Type: Panchayati raj (India)
  - Body: Gram panchayat

Population (2011)
  - Total: 1,246
  - Density: 80/km^{2} (210/sq mi)

Languages
  - Official: Kannada
- Time zone: UTC+5:30 (IST)
- PIN: 585304
- ISO 3166 code: IN-KA
- Vehicle registration: KA 33
- Website: karnataka.gov.in

Ekchinti, Wadgera is a village in the southern state of Karnataka, India. Administratively since 2017, Ekchinti, Wadgera has been under the Wadgera Taluka of Yadgir district in Karnataka. It lies on the left (east) bank of the Krishna River. Ekchinti is 8 kilometers by road southwest of the village of Hayyal (B), Wadgera and 28 kilometers by road northwest of the City of Shahapur, Karnataka.and 24 kilometers by road northeast of the Taluka of Wadgera Taluka.and 49 kilometers by road northeast of the District of Yadgir . The nearest rail station is Yadgir railway station and the nearest railhead is in Yadgir.

== Education ==
The government primary school at Ekchinti has twice been shifted away to other locales.

== Demographics ==
At the 2011 census, Ekchinti had 1,246 inhabitants, with 615 males and 631 females.
