= Halil Pasha (disambiguation) =

Halil Pasha (fl. 1631–1633) was an Ottoman governor of Egypt.

Halil Pasha may also refer to:

- Çandarlı Kara Halil Hayreddin Pasha (fl. 1364–1387), Ottoman grand vizier (Çandarlı Halil Pasha the Elder)
- Imamzade Halil Pasha (fl. 1406–1413), Ottoman grand vizier
- Çandarlı Halil Pasha (died 1453), Ottoman grand vizier (Çandarlı Halil Pasha the Younger, his grandson)
- Halil Pasha (David Passi) (fl. 1560s – fl. 1599), Jewish spy for the Ottoman Empire, Spain, Venice, and England
- Damat Halil Pasha (died 1629), Ottoman grand vizier
- Köse Halil Pasha (died 1715), Ottoman governor of Egypt and Bosnia
- Kara Halil Pasha (died 1775), Ottoman governor of Egypt
- Ivazzade Halil Pasha (1724–1777), Ottoman grand vizier
- Halil Hamid Pasha (1736–1785), Ottoman grand vizier
- Halil Rifat Pasha (1820–1901), Ottoman grand vizier
- Halil Şerif Pasha (1831–1879), Ottoman diplomat and art collector
- Halil Pasha (painter) (1857–1939), Impressionist painter
- Halil Kut (1881–1957), Ottoman and Turkish military commander

== See also ==
- Halil (name)
- Pasha
