= Rafeeq Saudagar =

Indian Urdu Writer and Poet

- ڈاکٹر رفیق سوداگر
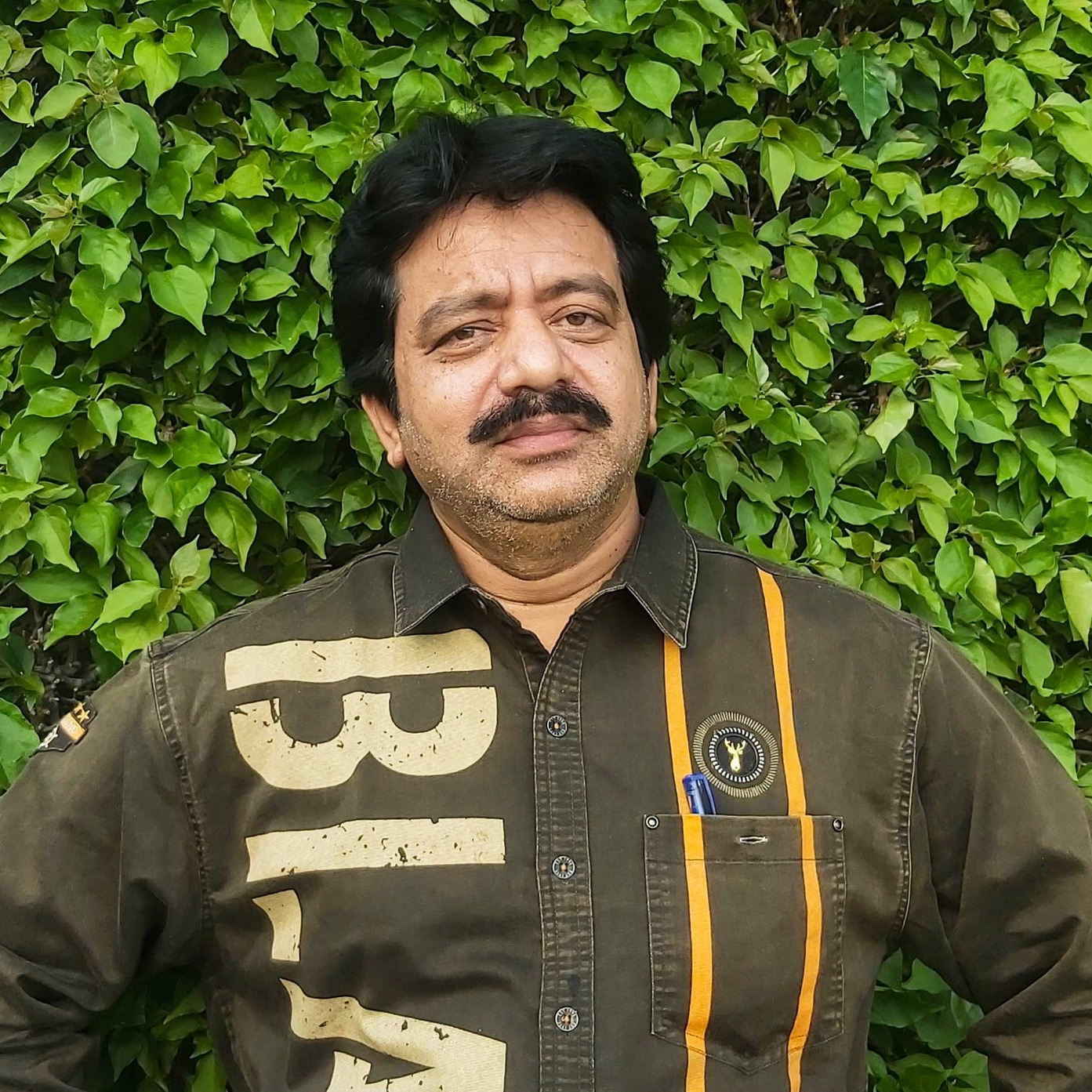
- Born: 28 March 1971 (age 55); Kadechur, Mysore State, India
- Education: D. Pharma BUMS
- Alma mater: Tipu Sultan Unani Medical College Gulbarga, P.B College of Pharmacy Yadgir.
- Occupations: Poet, lyricist and doctor
- Spouse: Kahkashan Saudagar
- Children: 3
- Parent: Abdul Razak Saudagar (Father) Hafeeza Begum (Mother)
- Writing career
- Language: Urdu
- Genre: Ghazal
- Notable works: Safar Kahkashan Ka (2007); Yaad e Maazi (06-04-2013)
- Notable awards: Achievers Award (Karnataka Urdu Academy and Karnataka Centre Muslim Association).
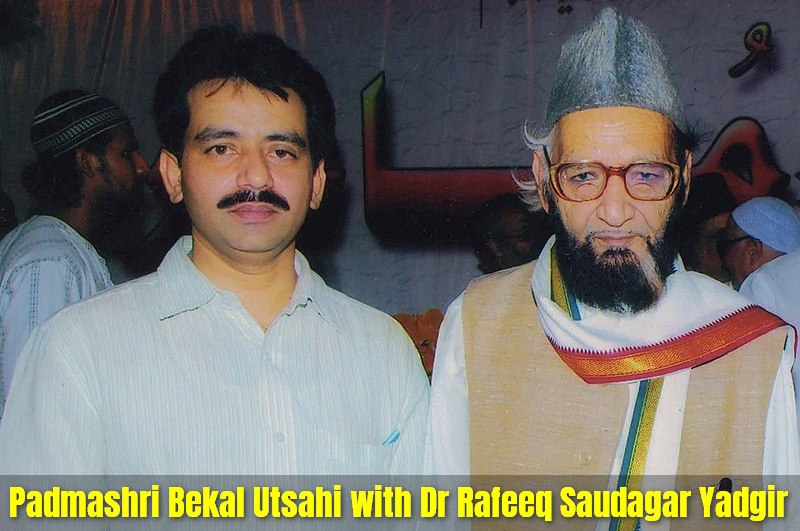
- Saudagar (left) with Bekal Utsahi at National Integration Mushaira (2011) organised by Anjuman Muhibban-e-Urdu (A.P) at Public Garden, Nampally in Hyderabad.

President of Anjuman Muhibban-e-Urdu
- In office 2012–present
- Unit: Yadgir Unit

President of the All India Urdu Development Organization
- In office 2012–Present
- Unit: Yadgir Unit

Rafeeq Saudagar (Urdu: رفیق سوداگر, born 28 March 1971) is an Indian Urdu poet and doctor. He is the President of the Anjuman Muhibban-e-Urdu (Yadgir Unit). He was awarded the "Achievers Award" by the Karnataka Urdu Academy and the Karnataka Centre Muslim Association in Raichur on 23 June 2019. He is from Yadgir district, Karnataka.

== Early life ==
Saudagar was born to Abdul Razak Saudagar and Hafeeza Begum on 28 March 1971 in Kadechur, Yadgir district, Karnataka.

Saudagar completed his graduation in BUMS from Tipu Sultan Unani Medical College, Gulbarga, and his D. Pharma from P.B. College of Pharmacy, Yadgir. He is a doctor and an Urdu poet by profession.

He began writing poetry at the age of 18 but published his first book in 2004. He is also a supporter of the Urdu language and the Urdu-speaking people of India.

== Personal life ==
Saudagar married Kahkashan Saudagar in 2004. The couple has three sons and lives in Millat Nagar, Yadgir city, Karnataka.

== Positions held ==
- President - All India Urdu Development Organization - 2012–Present.
- President - Anjuman Muhibban-e-Urdu (Yadgir Unit) - 2012–Present.

== Awards ==
- Achievers award - Karnataka Urdu Academy and Karnataka Centre Muslim Association.

== Bibliography ==
- Safar Kahkashan Ka.
- Yaad e Maazi.

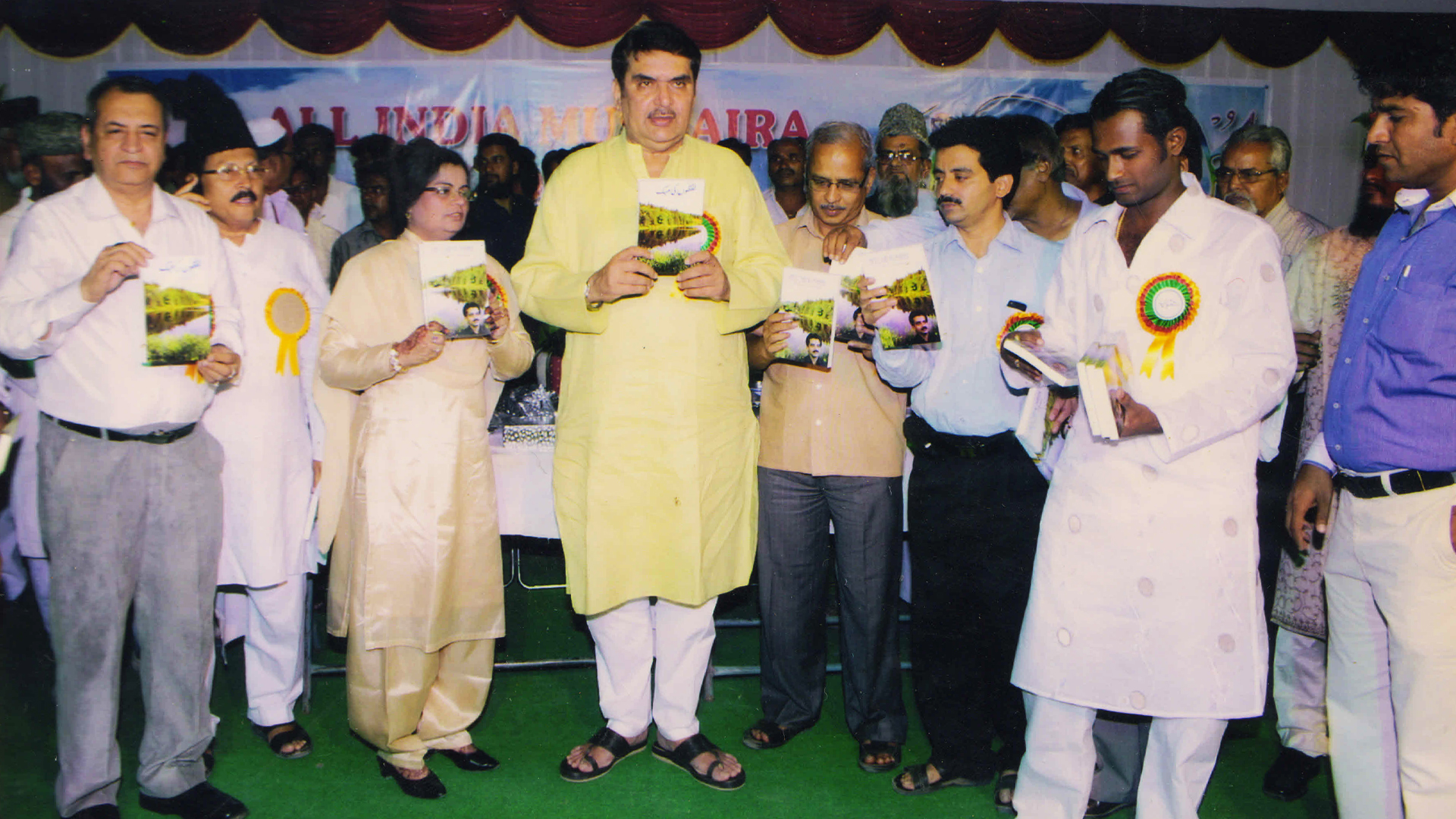
Raza Murad (Indian actor), Khaleel Mamoon (Urdu poet and a former IPS officer), and Dr Veer Basawanthreddy Mudnal (former MLA) launched "Lafzon ki Mahek" written by Dr Rafeeq Saudagar in Yadgir on Saturday, 27 March 2010, at All India Mushaira in Yadgir.
