= Madarkal, Wadgera =

Madarkal Wadgera
- Village
- Location within Karnataka Location within India
- Coordinates: 16°33′8.988″N 76°55′48.13″E
- Country: India
- State: Karnataka
- District: Yadgir district
- Taluka: Wadgera Taluka
- Gram Panchayat: Hayyal (B), Wadgera

Government
  - Type: Panchayati raj (India)
  - Body: Gram panchayat

Population (2011)
  - Total: 1,096
  - Density: 80/km^{2} (210/sq mi)

Languages
  - Official: Kannada
- Time zone: UTC+5:30 (IST)
- PIN: 585304
- ISO 3166 code: IN-KA
- Vehicle registration: KA 33
- Website: karnataka.gov.in

Madarkal, Wadgera is a village in the southern state of Karnataka, India. Administratively since 2017, Madarkal, Wadgera has been under the Wadgera Taluka of Yadgir district in Karnataka. It lies on the left (east) bank of the Krishna River. Madarkal is 4 kilometers by road southwest of the village of Hayyal (B), Wadgera and 24 kiolmeters by road northwest of the City of Shahapur, Karnataka.and 20 kiolmeters by road northeast of the Taluka of Wadgera Taluka.and 45 kiolmeters by road northeast of the District of Yadgir . The nearest rail station is Yadgir railway station and the nearest railhead is in Yadgir.

== Education ==
The government primary school at Madarkal has twice been shifted away to other locales.

== Demographics ==
At the 2011 census, Madarkal had 1,096 inhabitants, with 558 males and 538 females.
