= Agnihal =

- Village
- Location within Karnataka Location within India
- Coordinates: 16°25′39″N 077°15′26″E
- Country: India
- State: Karnataka
- District: Yadgir district
- Taluka: Wadgera

Government
  - Type: Panchayat raj
  - Body: Gram panchayat

Population (2001)
  - Total: 477

Languages
  - Official: Kannada
- Time zone: UTC+5:30 (IST)
- ISO 3166 code: IN-KA
- Vehicle registration: KA
- Website: karnataka.gov.in

Agnihal is a village in the southern state of Karnataka, India. Administratively, it is under Gonal panchayat village, Wadgera Taluka of Yadgir district in Karnataka.

== Demographics ==
As of 2001 census, Agnihal had 477 inhabitants, with 235 males (49.3%) and 242 females (50.7%), for a gender ratio of 1,030 females per thousand males.

== See also ==
- Shahapur
- Yadgir
