= Tumkur (disambiguation) =

Tumkur may refer to:

- Tumkur, or Tumakuru, an industrial town in southwestern Karnataka, India
  - Tumakuru district
    - Tumkur Lok Sabha constituency
    - Tumkur Rural Assembly constituency
  - Tumkur City Assembly constituency
  - Tumkur University
- Tumkur, Wadgera, a village Yadgir district, Karnataka, India
