= Ḥalil (Bernstein) =

Composition by Leonard Bernstein

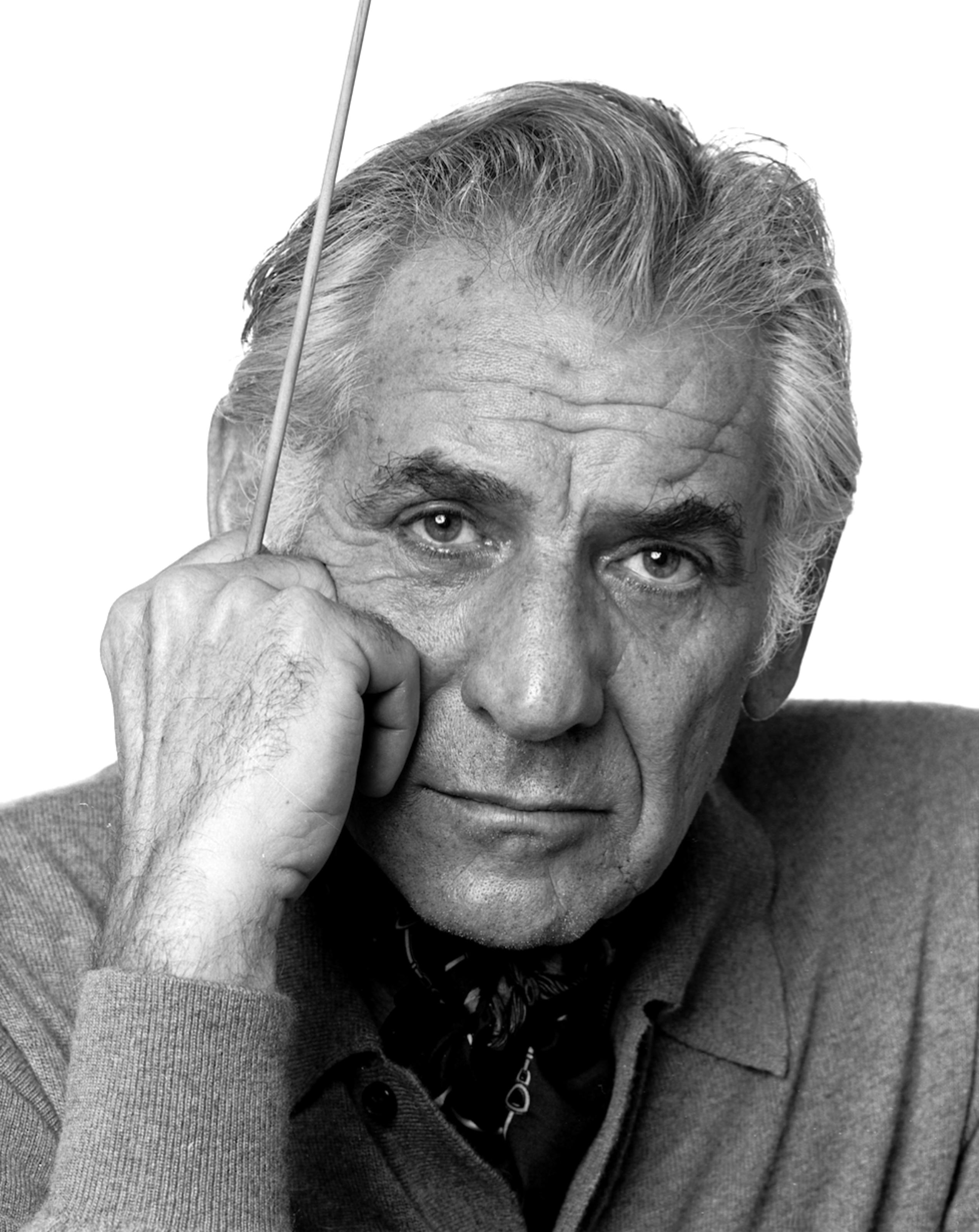
Leonard Bernstein in 1977

Ḥalil is a work for flute and chamber orchestra composed by Leonard Bernstein in 1981. The work is named after the halil, an ancient Jewish wind instrument. The work is 16 minutes in length. Bernstein composed Ḥalil in honor of a young Israeli flutist Yadin Tanenbaum who was killed at the Suez Canal during the 1973 Yom Kippur War.

The work was premiered at the Sultan's Pool in Jerusalem on May 27, 1981, with Jean-Pierre Rampal as the soloist and Bernstein conducting the Israel Philharmonic. The American premiere took place at Tanglewood on July 4, 1981, with Doriot Anthony Dwyer as the soloist and members of the Boston Symphony Orchestra.

== Instrumentation ==
Ḥalil is scored for solo flute, piccolo and alto flute, timpani, five percussionists (four snare drums, bass drum, four tom toms, a pair of cymbals, high and low crash cymbals, high and low gongs, chimes, tam-tam, high and low triangles, four woodblocks, whip, xylophone, glockenspiel, and vibraphone), harp, and strings.

In the 1987 version for flute, piano, and percussion the timpani becomes optional and the keyboard percussion parts (xylophone, glockenspiel, and vibraphone) are eliminated. Bernstein notes, "Piccolo and Alto Flute, in the orchestral version, must sound from a distance and be unseen."

== Dedication ==
In the score to Ḥalil, Bernstein writes:

This work is dedicated 'To the spirit of Yadin and to his fallen brothers...
Ḥalil (the Hebrew word for 'flute') is formally unlike any other work I have written, but is like much of my music in its struggle between tonal and non-tonal forces. In this case, I sense that struggle as involving wars and the threat of wars, the overwhelming desire to live, and the consolations of art, love and the hope for peace. It is a kind of night-music, which, from its opening 12-tone row to its ambiguously diatonic final cadence, is an ongoing conflict of nocturnal images: wish-dreams, nightmares, repose, sleeplessness, night-terrors and sleep itself, Death's twin brother. I never knew Yadin Tannenbaum, but I know his spirit.

== Structure ==
While Bernstein dabbled in dodecaphonic writing in Kaddish and Dybbuk, Ḥalil is rooted in twelve-tone techniques. The flute solo falls silent near the end of the work, as if to suggest the wastefulness of Yadin's death, and the alto flute embedded within the orchestra or placed off stage plays a duet with the solo viola. Halil was received well by critics; the horror that Bernstein attempted to convey was heard. A Washington Tribune critic commented, "[Ḥalil is] a brooding, terrific element which whispers of nightmares and nameless horrors."
