= Naikal, Wadgera =

Naikal
- village
- Location in Karnataka, India Naikal (India)
- Coordinates: 16°43′23″N 077°03′54″E
- Country: India
- State: Karnataka
- District: Yadgir
- Taluka: Wadgera

Government
  - Type: Panchayat raj
  - Body: Gram panchayat

Population (2001)
  - Total: 6,050

Languages
  - Official: Kannada
- Time zone: UTC+5:30 (IST)
- PIN: 585319
- Telephone code: PIN
- ISO 3166 code: IN-KA
- Vehicle registration: KA 33
- Website: karnataka.gov.in

Naikal is a village in the southern state of Karnataka, India. It lies at the foot of a rocky hill called Parmanan, along the Yadgir-Shahapur Road (State Highway 15 (Karnataka)). Administratively, it is under Wadgera Taluk of Yadgir district in Karnataka. The Naikal Hill Station, #17 of the Great Arc Meridional Survey, was located just east of the village on another rocky hill called Gúrbasapa.

Naikal lies along the path of the proposed Surat-Chennai Expressway, and over forty hectares of Naikal's irrigated land was condemned by eminent domain in 2020 for the project.

KBN Agro Industries operates a cotton gin in Naikal, and Sugureshwar Mineral Water operates a bottling plant there.

== Demographics ==
As of 2001 India census, Naikal had a population of 6,050 with 3,010 males and 3,040 females.
