= Behrooz NaqdiBeyk =

Iranian pilot colonel (1958–2019)

- Born: 1958; Tehran, Imperial State of Iran
- Died: February 16, 2019 (aged 60–61); Baqiyatallah Hospital, Tehran
- Allegiance: Islamic Republic of Iran Armed Forces
- Service / branch: Islamic Republic of Iran Air Force
- Rank: Colonel
- Battles / wars: Iran–Iraq War

Behrouz NaqdiBeyk (1958–2019) was the pilot colonel of the F-4 Phantom 2 and Dassault Mirage F-1 of the Air Force of the Islamic Republic of Iran Armed Forces.

Together with Hossein Khalili, he has been one of the force's youngest fighter pilots since the beginning of the Iran-Iraq war. His main reputation was participating in the Iran-Iraq war with 44 successful operations as well as managing the Dassault Mirage F-1 operational project, which was brought to Iran in the first Persian Gulf War. Naqdi Beyk has been called the godfather of Mirage Iran.

== Background ==
NaqdiBeyk was born in Tehran in 1958 and joined the Air Force in 1976. He successfully spent his piloting period in the United States with T-37, T-41 and T-38 aircraft and returned to the country shortly before the revolution. Where he trained in the 11th Battalion of the 1st Mehrabad Hunting Base as an F-4 Phantom bomber pilot.

Known as the "Godfather" of the Mirage since 1993, he flew the first Mirage aircraft without any training manuals, and in the course of his missions and experiences, wrote a flight instruction book with the fighter.

== Mirage Godfather ==
Twenty-four Iraqi Mirage F-1 fled to Iran during the war to liberate Kuwait (the first Persian Gulf War). Iran also used these fighters as part of the damage of the imposed war and used these fighters in the army air force. Not only did the planes enter Iran without manuals and technical instructions, but they all did not have weapons depots. Spare parts for the aircraft were also not available, while the Mirage technology level did not allow you to drop it. Therefore, with the decision of Mansour Sattari, Commander of the Air Force of the Army of the Islamic Republic of Iran, Iranian specialists started operating the aircraft without referring to the country of manufacture. With the launch and overhaul of these aircraft, a Mirage F-1 aircraft was ready to fly at the Hamedan base in the summer of 1993. Or if there were initial conditions for the Mirage flight, an experienced pilot would have to accept the risk of flying with this unfamiliar aircraft. Meanwhile, Col. Behrouz Naqdibek volunteered for his first Mirage flight, using his experience with the McDonnell Douglas F-4 Phantom 2 bomber. Pilot Behrouz Naqdi Beyk successfully made his first flight with this fighter at Nojeh Air Base on October 15, 1993, in the presence of the Commander of the Army Air Force, which was the beginning of his service in the Army Operational Fleet.

== Death ==
NaqdiBeyk died on the evening of February 16, 2019 at the age of 61 in Baqiyatallah Hospital in Tehran.
