= Kadechur =

Village in Karnataka, India

- Country: India
- State: Karnataka
- District: Yadgir

Population (2011)
  - Total: 3,953

Kadechur, formerly known as Karachur, is a village and gram panchayat in the Yadgir district of the Indian state of Karnataka.

== History ==
In a 1935 report, Ghulam Yazdani mentioned that the village had about 200 houses, and the only way to reach it was via bullock-cart.

In 2017, a rail bogie factory was inaugurated on the outskirts of the village, located in the land between Kadechur and the nearby Badiyal village. There are plans to develop the area as a pharmaceutical manufacturing hub.

== Landmarks ==
An old mosque dating back to the Adil Shahi period is located here. The mosque is a landmark of the village, on account of its size and architectural significance. The mosque is built out of stone, and situated on a plinth. Its facade is flanked by two slim minarets, and contains three arched entrances leading into the interior. Two platforms, upon which graves are situated, stand opposite the mosque.

== Demographics ==
As of the 2011 census, the village has a population of 3953, in 631 households.
