= Khalil Allah =

Khalil Allah or Khalilullah (Arabic: خليل الله, lit. 'Friend of God') is an Arabic name, usually associated with Abraham. It can also refer to:

- Khalilullah I (d. 1465), King of Shirvan
- Khalilullah II (d. 1535), King of Shirvan
- Khalilullah Butshikan (d. 1625/26), Iranian calligrapher
- Khalil Allah I (d. 1634), 37th Nizari imam
- Khalil Allah II Ali (d. 1680), 39th Nizari imam
- Shah Khalil Allah III (d. 1817), 45th Nizari imam
- Khalilullah Khalili (1907–1987), Afghan poet
- Khalil Ullah Khan (1934–2014), Bangladeshi actor
- Khalilullah (cricketer) (b. 1993), Pakistani cricketer

== See also ==
- Khalil (name)
- Khalil-ur-Rehman (disambiguation)
