= Çərmədil =

Çərmədil is a village in the municipality of Qubaxəlilli in the Ismailli Rayon of Azerbaijan.
