= Kahlil =

Kahlil is an anglicized spelling of the Arabic masculine given name Khalil, famously used by Lebanese-American writer, poet and visual artist Kahlil Gibran (1883–1931; born Jubrān Khalīl Jubrān) in English after he was registered under that name by the Josiah Quincy School of Boston following his immigration to the United States.

Notable persons with the name Kahlil include:

- Kahlil Ashanti (born 1973), American actor and writer
- Kahlil Bell (born 1986), American football running back
- Kahlil Benson (born 2002), American football player
- Kahlil Byrd, American political advisor and entrepreneur
- Kahlil Carter (born 1976), American gridiron football coach
- Kahlil Cato (born 1977), Saint Vincent and the Grenadines sprinter
- Kahlil Dukes (born 1995), American basketball player
- Kahlil Felder (born 1995), American basketball player
- Kahlil Gibran (sculptor) (1922–2008), Lebanese-American painter and sculptor
- Kahlil Hill (born 1979), American gridiron football player
- Kahlil Joseph, American actor and teacher of performing arts
- Kahlil Joseph (filmmaker) (born 1981), American filmmaker, music video director, and video artist
- Kahlil Lewis (born 1997), American football wide receiver
- Kahlil McKenzie (born 1997), American football guard
- Kahlil Seren (born 1978), American politician
- Kahlil Whitney (born 2001), American basketball player
