= Köse Halil Pasha =

Köse Halil Pasha ("Beardless Halil Pasha" in Turkish; died 1715), also known as Khalil Pasha al-Kawsaj ("Thin-bearded Halil Pasha" in Arabic), was an Ottoman statesman who served several high-level roles in the Ottoman Empire's administration, including service as Defterdar (financial minister; 1692/93–1694/95 and 1695/96–1699) and as the Ottoman governor of Bosnia Eyalet (1699–1702), Erzurum Eyalet (1703–04), Van Eyalet (1704–06), Basra Eyalet (1706–07, and again 1707–08), Sidon Eyalet (1708–1710), and Egypt Eyalet (1710–11). During his tenure in Erzurum, Halil Pasha was in command of a military expedition in Georgia in 1703.

As the governor of Egypt, he served during a turbulent time and was overthrown by the local (Mamluk) beys in 1711 after a small civil war.

== See also ==
- List of Ottoman governors of Egypt
- List of Ottoman governors of Bosnia

Political offices
Preceded by Moralı Ibrahim Pasha	Ottoman Governor of Egypt; 1710–1711	Succeeded by Veli Mehmed Pasha
