= Xəlilli, Nakhchivan =

Xəlilli
- Municipality
- Location within Azerbaijan
- Coordinates: 39°15′34″N 45°26′20″E
- Country: Azerbaijan
- Autonomous republic: Nakhchivan
- District: Babek

Population (2005)
  - Total: 630
- Time zone: UTC+4 (AZT)

Xəlilli (also, Khalilli and Khalilly) is a village and municipality in the Babek District of Nakhchivan, Azerbaijan. It is located in the left side of the Ordubad-Nakhchivan highway, 16 km in the north from the district center, on the right bank of the Nakhchivanchay River, on the plain. Its population is busy with grain-growing, vegetable-growing, poultry and animal husbandry. There are secondary school, library, club and a medical center in the village. It has a population of 630.

== Etymology ==
The name of the village is related with the name of the Xəlillilər tribe. The Xəlillilər (khalilliler) which was part of the Kayı tribe of Turkic origin, was moved from the Western Turkestan in the thirteenth century, some of them lived in the Shirvan region.
