= Badiyal =

- Village
- Location within Karnataka Location within India
- Coordinates: 16°29′28″N 077°16′31″E
- Country: India
- State: Karnataka
- District: Yadgir district
- Taluka: Yadgir Taluka

Government
  - Type: Panchayati raj (India)
  - Body: Gram panchayat

Population (2001)
  - Total: 2,691

Languages
  - Official: Kannada
- Time zone: UTC+5:30 (IST)
- PIN: 585221
- ISO 3166 code: IN-KA
- Vehicle registration: KA
- Website: karnataka.gov.in

Badiyal is a panchayat village in the southern state of Karnataka, India. Administratively, Badiyal is under the Yadgir Taluka of Yadgir district in Karnataka. Badiyal is 13.5 km by road east of the village of Bendebembli and 41 km by road south of the town of Yadgir. The nearest rail station is Chegunda Station, and the nearest railhead is in Yadgir.

There are five villages in the Badiyal gram panchayat: Badiyal, Gudur, Kodapur, Sangwar, and Mungal.

== Demographics ==
At the 2001 census, the village of Badiyal had 2,691 inhabitants, with 1,391 males and 1,300 females.
