= Khalil (name) =

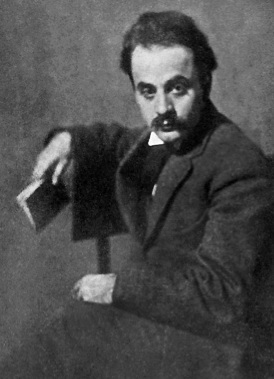
- Khalil Gibran, Lebanese–American artist and poet (1883–1931)
- Pronunciation: Arabic: [xaliːl]
- Gender: Male

Origin
- Origin: Arabic
- Meaning: "friend"

Other names
- Alternative spelling: Khaleel, Khelil
- Related names: Halil

Khalil or Khaleel (Arabic: خليل) means friend and is a common male first name in the Middle East, the Caucasus, the Balkans, North Africa, West Africa, East Africa, Central Asia and among Muslims in South Asia and as such is also a common surname. It is also used amongst Turkic peoples of Russia and African Americans. Abraham is given the title Khalīl-ullah (Arabic: خَلِیْل‌ ٱلله, romanized: Ḫalīl Allāḥ, lit. 'Friend of God') in Islam. The female counterpart of this name is Khalila or Khaleela.

== In other languages ==
The following names can be interpreted as Khalil:

- Arabic: Khalil, Khaleel, Halil, Khelil, Kalil (Ar: خليل)
- Hebrew: Khalil (He: חליל)
- Persian: Khalil (Fa: خلیل)
- Azerbaijani: Xəlilخليل
- Kurdish: Xelîl
- Turkish: Halil
- Somali: Khaliil
- Bosnian: Halil
- Bengali: Kholil (খলিল), Khalil (খালিল), Khaleel (খালীল)

== Persons with the given name ==
=== Khaleel ===
- Khaleel Mamoon (1948–2024), Urdu poet
- Khaleel-Ur-Rehman Azmi (1927–1978), Urdu poet

=== Al-Khalil ===
- Al-Khalil ibn Ahmad al-Farahidi (718–786), 8th-century Muslim scholar best known as the author of Kitab al-'Ayn

=== Khalil ===
- Khalil bey Khasmammadov (1873–1945), Azerbaijani politician
- Khalil (actor) (1903–1941), Indian actor
- Khalil (singer) (born 1994), American singer
- Khalil Abou Hamad (1936–1992), Lebanese lawyer and politician
- Khalil Ahmad (basketball) (born 1996), American basketball player
- Khalil Ahmad (politician) (1956–2024), Pakistani politician
- Khalil Ahmed (1936–1997), Pakistani composer
- Khalil al-Hayya (born 1960), Palestinian politician and lecturer
- Khalil Azmi (born 1964), Moroccan footballer
- Khalil Barnes (born 2005), American football player
- Khalil Bass (born 1990), American football player
- Khalil Davis (born 1996), American football player
- Khalil Dinkins (born 2002), American football player
- Khalil Dorsey (born 1998), American football player
- Khalil Fong (1983–2025), Hong Kong singer and songwriter
- Kahlil Gibran (1883–1931), Lebanese-American artist, poet and writer
- Khalil Greene (born 1979), American baseball player
- Khalil Haqqani (1966–2024), Afghan politician
- Khalil Herbert (born 1998), American football player
- Khalil al-Hibri, Lebanese politician
- Khalil ibn Ishaq al-Jundi (died 1365), Egyptian jurisprudent
- Khalil Isma'il Kanna al-Bayati (1905–1995), Kingdom of Iraq politician
- Khalil Jacobs (born 2003), American football player
- Khalil Mobasher Kashani (born 1951), Iranian Shi'i Cleric
- Khalil Kain (born 1964), American actor
- Khalil Khalil (born 1941), Lebanese barrister and diplomat
- Khalil Khamis (footballer, born 1992) (born 1992), Emirati footballer
- Khalil Khamis (footballer, born 1995) (born 1995), Lebanese footballer
- Khalil Mack (born 1991), American football player
- Khalil Makkawi (born 1930), Lebanese diplomat.
- Khalil Maleki (1903–1969), Iranian politician
- Khalil Mamut (born 1977), Uyghur refugee
- Khalil el-Moumni (1941–2020), Moroccan imam
- Khalil Paden (born 1989), American football player
- Khalil Ramos (born 1996), Filipino actor
- Khalil Rashow (born 1952), Yazidi-Kurdish academic
- Khalil al-Rifaei, Syrian politician
- Khalil Rountree Jr., (born 1990), American mixed martial artist
- Khalil al-Sakakini (1878–1953), Palestinian academic
- Khalil Shakir (born 2000), American football player
- Khalil Taha (1932–2020), Lebanese wrestler
- Khalil Tahmasebi (1924–1956), Iranian Islamist
- Khalil Tahir Sandhu (born 1967), Pakistani politician
- Khalil Taleghani (1912–1992), Iranian engineer and politician
- Khalil Tate (born 1998), American football player
- Khalil Tatem (born 1997), Filipino-Canadian rapper known professionally as Killy
- Khalil-ur-Rehman Qamar (born 1962), Pakistani Writer
- Khalil Wheeler-Weaver (born 1996), American serial killer
- Khalil Yosef Danker (born 1984), Israeli actor, singer, and model

=== Khelil ===
- Khelil Bouhageb (1863–1942), Tunisian politician and reformer

== Persons with the surname ==
=== Khaleel ===
- Bob Khaleel, American hip hop artist, better known by his stage name Bronx Style Bob (born 1965)
- Ibrahim Khaleel (born 1982), Indian cricketer

=== Khalil ===
- Ahmed Khalil (footballer, born 1991), Emirati footballer
- Amal Khalil (killed 2026), Lebanese journalist
- Amir Khalil (born 1964), Egyptian veterinarian and director of project development, known as the war vet
- Christel Khalil (born 1987), American actress of Pakistani and African descent
- Faisal Khalil (born 1982), Emirati footballer
- Jirard Khalil (born 1988), American YouTuber
- Joseph Abu Khalil (1925–2019), Lebanese politician and journalist
- Mahmoud Khalil (born 1995), see Detention of Mahmoud Khalil
- Mohammad Omer Khalil (born 1936), Sudanese-born artist
- Mustafa Khalil (1920–2008), Egyptian politician and Prime Minister of Egypt
- Peter Khalil (born 1973), Australian politician
- Raafat Khalil (born 2004), Egyptian footballer
- Rabih Abou-Khalil (born 1957), Lebanese oud player and composer

=== Khelil ===
- Chakib Khelil (born 1939), Algerian politician, minister
- Rima Khelil (born 1989), Algerian team handball player

== Fictional characters ==
- Khalil, a character debuted in Jonah: A VeggieTales Movie and appearing in the VeggieTales series
- Inayat Khalil, a villain in K.G.F: Chapter 2
- Prince Khalil, a character in The Princess Diaries
- Khalil Flemming, a Season 1 contestant in Fetch! with Ruff Ruffman
- Khalil Harris, fictional character in The Hate U Give
- Khalil Payne, alter-ego name Painkiller, a main character in Black Lightning
- Khalil Utbah, a character appearing in the anime series Inazuma Eleven

== Locations ==
Hebron or الخليل al-Khalīl / خَلِيل الرَّحْمَن Khalīl al-Raḥmān is an ancient city in the West Bank of Palestine. The name al-Khalīl derives from the Qur'anic epithet for Abraham, Khalil al-Rahman (إبراهيم خليل الرحمن) "Beloved of the Merciful" or "Friend of God". The name "Hebron" appears to trace back to two northwest Semitic languages, which coalesce in the form ḥbr, having reflexes in Hebrew and Amorite, with a basic sense of 'unite' and connoting a range of meanings from "colleague" to "friend". Arabic Al-Khalil thus precisely translates the ancient Hebrew toponym Ḥebron, understood as ḥaḇer (friend).

== See also ==
- Kahlil
- Khalil (disambiguation)
- Khalil Allah (disambiguation)
