= Khaleel Mamoon =

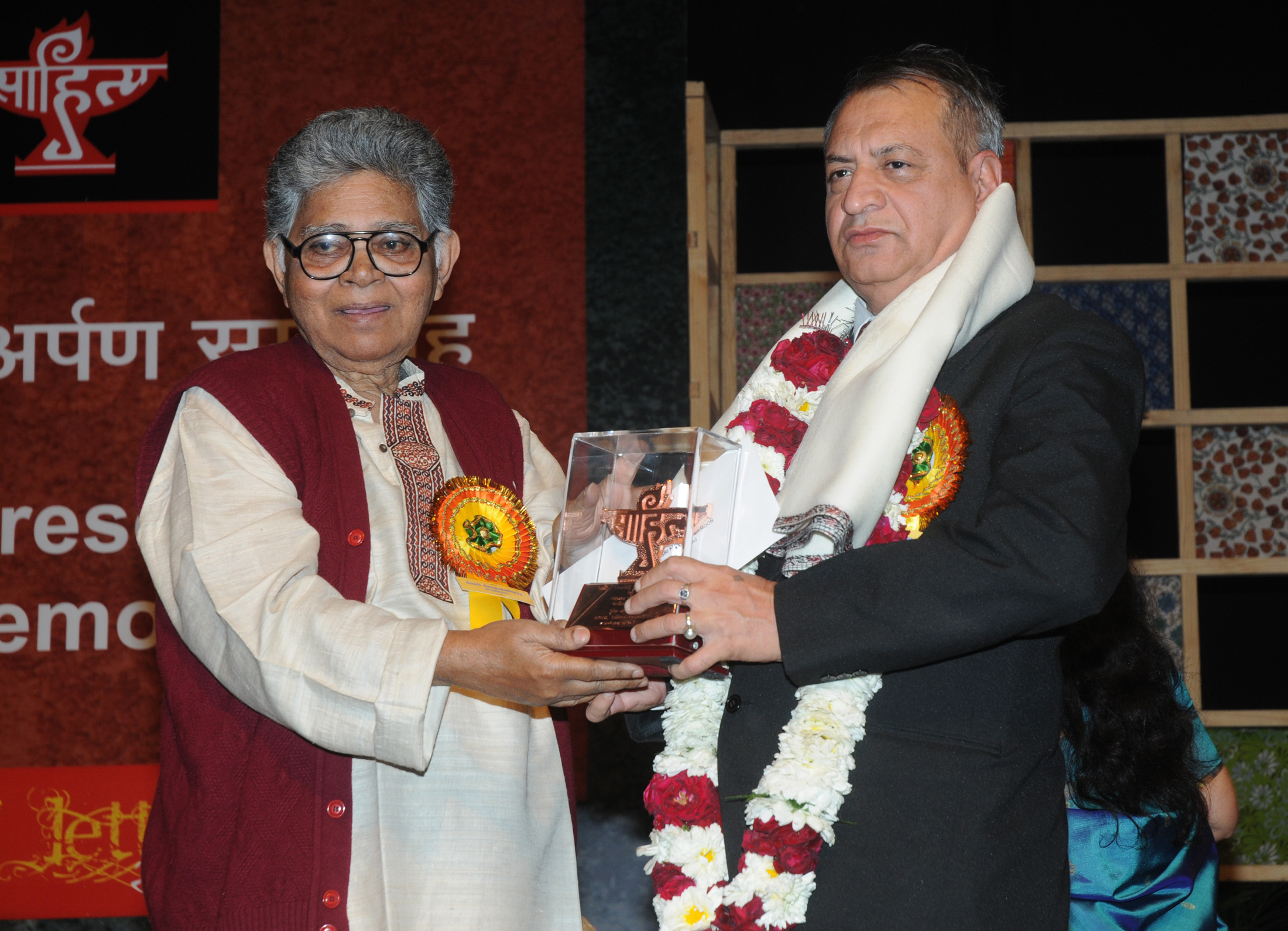
- The President of Sahitya Akademi, Shri Sunil Gangopadhyay presented the Sahitya Akademi Awards, 2011, at a function, in New Delhi.
- Born: 1948; Bangalore, Mysore State, India
- Died: 21 June 2024 (aged 75–76)
- Occupations: writer; IPS officer

Khaleel ur Rehman (1948 – 26 June 2024) from the Indian state of Karnataka, better known by his pen name Khaleel Mamoon, was a noted Urdu poet whose poetry collection Aafaaq ki Taraf won the 2011 Sahitya Akademi Award for works in Urdu. Rehman died on 21 June 2024, at the age of 76.

== Life and career ==
Mamoon was born in Bangalore. After working as a staff artist for All India Radio, Mamoon joined the Indian Police Service in 1977. He served in senior positions in Karnataka, including as Inspector General.

== Works ==
Mamoon has published a number of works. Lissan Falsafe Ke Aine Me on the philosophy of language was published in 1986. Unnees Lillahi Nazmen (1989) is a translation of poems written in praise of Muhammad by Scherzade Rikhye. Nishaat-e-Gham is a collections of Ghazals. Kannada Adab is a collection of translations of Kannada language poetry and fiction. Mamoon's poetry collection Aafaaq ki Taraf won the 2011 Sahitya Akademi Award for works in Urdu.

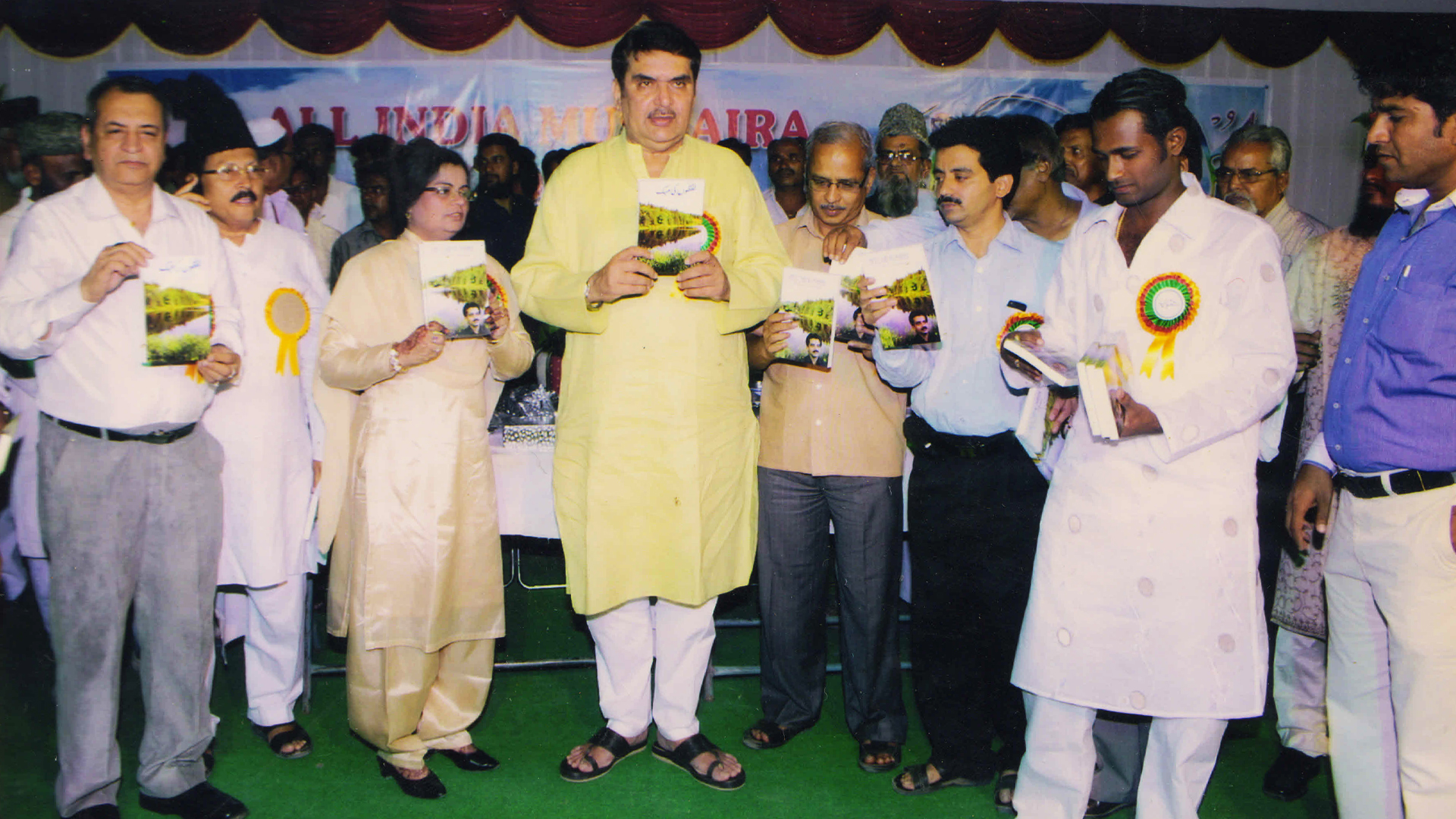
Raza Murad (Indian actor), Khaleel Mamoon (Urdu poet and a former IPS officer), and Dr Veer Basawanthreddy Mudnal (former MLA) launched "Lafzon ki Mahek" written by Dr Rafeeq Saudagar in Yadgir on Saturday, 27 March 2010, at All India Mushaira in Yadgir.

In 2004, Mamoon became the first Urdu writer to win the Karnataka Rajyotsava Prashasti.

Mamoon wrote his best poetry late in life. With age, he reflected more on his life experiences, which took a philosophical turn. He also became extremely prolific after retirement as he had more time to reflect on his experiences. Though his earlier career as an Editor of Saughat and Azkaar is quite well known, his later poetry has hardly been read or appreciated, partly due to his self-imposed anonymity and an aversion to public contact. He nonetheless carefully published many of these poems in two voluminous poetry collections, 'La Ilah' and 'Andherey Ujaley Mein'.

== Karnataka Urdu Academy chairmanship ==
Mamoon served as the Chairman of the Karnataka Urdu Academy between 2008 and 2010. He was removed in controversial circumstances in 2010 for functioning in an 'arrogant manner'. H.S. Shivaprakash, Dean, School of Arts and Aesthetics, Jawaharlal Nehru University resigned from the Karnataka Sahitya Academy in protest of government interference in an autonomous body.
