= Khalilli, Kurdamir =

Khalilli
- Location within Azerbaijan
- Coordinates: 40°09′43″N 47°59′44″E
- Country: Azerbaijan
- Rayon: Kurdamir
- Time zone: UTC+4 (AZT)
  - Summer (DST): UTC+5 (AZT)

Khalilli (also, Khalily) is a village in the Kurdamir Rayon of Azerbaijan.
