= Ottoman invasion of western Georgia (1703) =

Military expedition by the Ottoman Empire

Ottoman invasion of Western Georgia
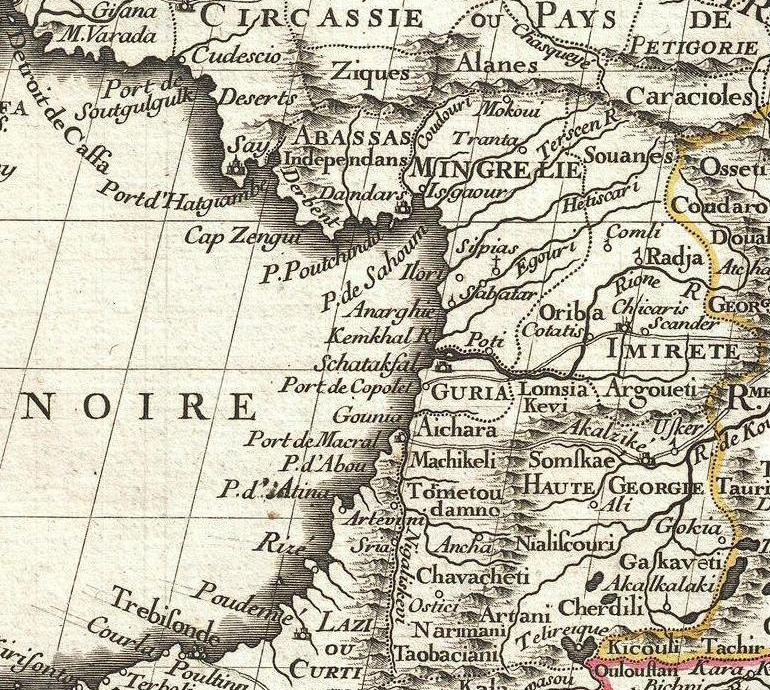
- A portion of the 1724 French map, focused on western Georgia
Date	June – August 1703
Location	Western Georgia
Result	Georgian victory

Belligerents
Ottoman Empire	Kingdom of Imereti; Principality of Mingrelia; Principality of Guria

Commanders and leaders
(Ottoman Empire) Mustafa II; (Ottoman Empire) Ahmed III; (Ottoman Empire) Köse Halil Pasha; (Ottoman Empire) Ishak I Jaqeli; Prince George	George V Abashidze; George IV Dadiani; Mamia III Gurieli

Strength
80,000	Unknown

The 1703 Ottoman invasion of western Georgia was a military expedition undertaken by the Ottoman Empire against the tributary states in western Georgia—Imereti, Guria, and Mingrelia. This considerable military deployment, ostensibly to settle a power struggle in Imereti in favor of the sultan's candidate, portended a change in Ottoman policy in the fluid frontier region in the Caucasus and aimed at consolidating the imperial authority among the restive Georgian subjects. The costly war contributed to the fall of Sultan Mustafa II, having incited a mutiny of the disaffected troops at Constantinople. The new Ottoman government curtailed the campaign and effected withdrawal from much of western Georgia's interior. The Turks held the Black Sea coastline and several fortresses close to the littoral.

== Background ==
At the outset of the 18th century, three states in western Georgia recognized Ottoman suzerainty: the principalities of Mingrelia (Dadian for the Ottomans) and Guria (Guriel)—ruled by the Dadiani and Gurieli dynasties, respectively—and the Kingdom of Imereti (Açık Baş), all once parts of the medieval kingdom of Georgia. They were regarded as tributary states and allowed internal self-rule. These were hereditary monarchies, but their rulers were expected to be confirmed by the Ottoman sultan on their accession and, in return, to pay an annual tribute. However, these provisions were not frequently respected and payment of tribute was at times irregular. The principal intermediary between the Ottoman court and western Georgian rulers were the Muslim Georgian dynasty of Jaqeli, then ruling as Ottoman frontier governors of Çıldır, based in Akhaltsikhe (Ahıska).

The immediate cause of the Ottoman intervention in western Georgia in 1703 was a local power struggle in Imereti, one of many which continuously plagued that kingdom. In a series of events, the Imeretian king Simon, favored by the sultan's government, was deposed by the powerful nobleman George Abashidze, who then had him murdered with the help of Mamia III Gurieli, Prince of Guria, in 1701. After Mamia's brief spell as king of Imereti, Abashidze himself usurped the crown in 1702. As his power grew, Abashidze withheld tribute from the Ottomans as did the princes of Mingrelia and Guria. Northwest of Mingrelia, the Abkhaz pirates began attacking Turkish trade along the eastern Black Sea coastline.

== Preparations ==
Reacting to the Imeretian upheaval, the Ottoman government promised the crown to Prince George, the younger brother of the murdered king Simon, then residing at Akhaltsikhe. Ishak, governor of Çıldır, was ordered to conduct George to his kingdom and preparations for a major military expedition were set in train. While a civil war and break in dynastic succession in Imereti as well as unilateral acts on part of the western Georgian rulers were not uncommon, the massive military response was a change in the Ottomans' policy in Georgia, further dictated by the necessity of consolidating control over the fluid frontier zone against the background of recent losses in Europe and increased activity of the Russians on the Black Sea; Tsar Peter I had succeeded in conquering the Ottoman fortress of Azov and was looked upon by many in Georgia with hope.

An unusually large expeditionary force was marshalled between March and July 1703. All provincial troops of eastern and northeastern Anatolia were required to participate along with substantial contingents of the standing army at the capital. The commander in chief of this expeditionary force, Köse Halil Pasha, governor of Erzurum, was instructed to conquer Guria, install George VI in place of Abashidze in Imereti, and leave Ottoman garrisons at Imereti's capital of Kutaisi (Kutais for the Ottomans) and one of its major provincial towns, Baghdati (Bağdadcık). The absence of Mamia Gurieli's replacement in the sultan's orders implied that the imperial government planned to eliminate Guria's self-rule altogether while reducing Imereti's autonomy.

== Campaign ==
In June–July 1703, Halil Pasha led a three-pronged attack against western Georgia. The troops under his direct command crossed the Çoruh River on pontoons and invaded Guria, while the contingent under his second-in-command joined by the troops of Ishak Pasha of Çildir fought their way through the Zekari Pass into Imereti. The third force was landed by the Ottoman navy in Mingrelia.

Facing the invasion, Imereti's ruler Abashidze had secured the loyalty of Gurieli and Dadiani as well as most Imeretian nobles. They blocked roads and evacuated civilians, while the Ottomans took fortress after fortress. After Halil Pasha conquered Batumi (Batum) on Guria's Black Sea coast and began to erect a new fortress there, Gurieli felt compelled to submit to the Ottoman commander. Imeretian prince Giorgi Mikeladze, Abashidze's foe, defected to the Ottomans and opened the blocked roads. The Abkhaz princes also switched sides and, in their quest for booty, sent their boats to join the Turks in Guria. The Ottoman contingents then converged upon Imereti. The Imeretians failed to withstand the Ottoman artillery and lost Baghdati. The heavily fortified towers of Chalatqe in the canton of Argveti offered stiff resistance, but were eventually blown up by Ishak Pasha's soldiers. While Guria and Imereti were largely overran, Mingrelia mostly held out although the Ottoman troops destroyed the fortress of Rukhi, raided the surrounding countryside, and began fortifying Anaklia as their new outpost on the Black Sea coast.

A second Ottoman army was ready at Constantinople, when four companies of Janissaries assigned to the Georgian expedition mutinied on 18 July 1703. On 22 August, Sultan Mustafa was forced to abdicate in a coup, which come to be known as the Edirne event. The new sultan, Ahmed III, refused to fund a Georgian war. The new vizier, Kavanoz Ahmed Pasha, offered Abashidze peace provided he demolished the fortress of Shorapani, gave hostages and tribute, and recognized George VI as king of Imereti under his tutelage. Abashidze agreed but then blocked a road back to Akhaltsikhe. The Georgians ambushed and destroyed the withdrawing Ottoman force. Very few made their way back to Akhlatsikhe; the governor of Çildir was wounded and that of Göle was killed.

The Georgian campaign resonated in the empire's eastern European neighbors: in his letter of 3 August 1703 the Ukrainian Cossack hetman Ivan Mazepa informed the Russian government that the Turks had suffered a "considerable defeat in the land of Georgia" and a second army was ready to be deployed against the Georgians.

== Aftermath ==
Western Georgia, albeit not fully conquered thanks to the coup at Constantinople, was left devastated. The maritime district around Batumi was irretrievably lost for Guria and the Turkish garrisons were permanently stationed in the Mingrelian fortresses of Poti, Anaklia, and Rukhi along the coastline and in Baghdati in Imereti's heartland. Abashidze confined George VI, the sultan's Imeretian protégé, in the castle of Kutaisi, but his recovery of power was temporary. As Abashidze's power was draining, the unity imposed upon western Georgia crumbled. By 1707, George VI succeeded in dislodging Abashidze from Kutaisi, but found himself embroiled in fighting with Mamia Gurieli. Giorgi Dadiani's hold on power also shattered and finally eclipsed under his own son's pressure in 1715.

== Bibliography ==
- Rekhviashvili, Mikheil (1989). K. Chkhataraishvili (ed.). იმერეთის სამეფო (1462–1810 წ.წ.) [The Kingdom of Imereti (1462–1810)] (in Georgian). Tbilisi: Tbilisi University Press.
