= Qaleh-ye Khalili =

Qaleh-ye Khalili قلعه خليلي
- Village
- Location within Iran
- Coordinates: 30°09′13″N 52°03′07″E
- Country: Iran
- Province: Fars
- County: Sepidan
- Bakhsh: Hamaijan
- Rural District: Hamaijan

Population (2006)
  - Total: 561
- Time zone: UTC+3:30 (IRST)
  - Summer (DST): UTC+4:30 (IRDT)

Qaleh-ye Khalili (Persian: قلعه خليلي, also Romanized as Qal‘eh-ye Khalīlī; also known as Khalīlī) is a village in Hamaijan Rural District, Hamaijan District, Sepidan County, Fars province, Iran. At the 2006 census, its population was 561, in 122 families.
