= Halil Köse =

Footballer (born 1997)

Personal information
- Full name: Halil Ibrahim Köse
- Date of birth: 21 April 1997 (age 29)
- Place of birth: Sint-Niklaas, Belgium
- Position: Midfielder

Team information
- Current team: FCS Mariekerke-Branst

Youth career
- –2017: Club Brugge

Senior career*
Years	Team	Apps	(Gls)
2017–2019	Tubize	33	(0)
2020	Ronse	5	(0)
2020–2022	Liège	22	(0)
2022–2023	Knokke	5	(0)
2023–2024	Avanti Stekene		
2024–	FCS Mariekerke-Branst	25	(0)

International career^{‡}
2013	Turkey U17	2	(0)
2016	Turkey U19	1	(0)
- * Club domestic league appearances and goals as of 18:08, 5 May 2025 (UTC) ‡ National team caps and goals as of 10:05, 21 November 2024 (UTC)

Halil Ibrahim Köse (born 21 April 1997) is a footballer who plays as a midfielder for Belgian club FCS Mariekerke-Branst. Born in Belgium, he represented Turkey at youth international level.

== Career statistics ==
=== Club ===
As of 2 July 2018.

Club	Season	League			Cup		Continental		Other		Total	
Club	Season	Division	Apps	Goals	Apps	Goals	Apps	Goals	Apps	Goals	Apps	Goals
Tubize	2016–17	Belgian First Division B	1	0	0	0	–		0	0	1	0
Tubize	2017–18	Belgian First Division B	9	0	0	0	–		0	0	9	0
Career total			10	0	0	0	–		0	0	10	0
