= Qubaxəlilli =

- Municipality
- Location within Azerbaijan
- Coordinates: 40°36′58″N 48°07′27″E
- Country: Azerbaijan
- Rayon: Ismailli

Population
  - Total: 2,467
- Time zone: UTC+4 (AZT)
  - Summer (DST): UTC+5 (AZT)

Qubaxəlilli (also Khalilli and Kuba-Khalilli) is a village and municipality in the Ismailli Rayon of Azerbaijan. It has a population of 2,467. The municipality consists of the villages of Qubaxəlilli and Çərmədil.
