= Bendebembli, Wadgera =

Bendebembli Bendebembali, Bendbombli
- Village
- Location within Karnataka Location within India
- Coordinates: 16°28′42″N 077°09′58″E
- Country: India
- State: Karnataka
- District: Yadgir district
- Taluka: Wadgera Taluka

Government
  - Type: Panchayati raj (India)
  - Body: Gram panchayat

Population (2001)
  - Total: 2,466

Languages
  - Official: Kannada
- Time zone: UTC+5:30 (IST)
- PIN: 585355
- ISO 3166 code: IN-KA
- Vehicle registration: KA 33
- Website: karnataka.gov.in

Bendebembli, is a panchayat village in the southern state of Karnataka, India. Administratively, Bendebembli is under the Wadgera, Taluka of Yadgir district in Karnataka. It lies on the left (east) bank of the Krishna River. Bendebembli is 10 km by road southeast of the village of Tumkur and 40 km by road south of the town of Yadgir. The nearest rail station is Chegunda Station and the nearest railhead is in Yadgir.

There are seven villages in the gram panchayat: Bendebembli, Habshihal, Itga Simt Wadgera, Kadrapur, Kodal and Tumkur.

== Demographics ==
At the 2001 census, Bendebembli had 2,466 inhabitants, with 1,191 males and 1,275 females.
