= Al-Khalil family =

Al Khalil (الخليل) is an old Arabic tribe who live in the village of Jammain, in the district of Nablus in the West Bank. A fraction of the family migrated and settled in Egypt. They belong to the mother tribe of Al Zeitawi. Al Zeitawi is an old Arabic tribe that arrived to Palestine after coming from Mecca. It is believed that the Zeitawi tribe are direct descendants of Muhammad.
