= Xəlilli, Agsu =

Xəlilli
- Municipality
- Location within Azerbaijan
- Coordinates: 40°29′48″N 48°10′07″E
- Country: Azerbaijan
- Rayon: Agsu

Population
  - Total: 749
- Time zone: UTC+4 (AZT)
  - Summer (DST): UTC+5 (AZT)

Xəlilli (also, Khalilli, Khalli, and Khayli) is a village and municipality in the Agsu Rayon of Azerbaijan. It has a population of 749.
