= Xəlilli, Ismailli =

Xəlilli
- Municipality
- Location within Azerbaijan
- Coordinates: 40°37′08″N 48°12′00″E
- Country: Azerbaijan
- Rayon: Ismailli

Population
  - Total: 320
- Time zone: UTC+4 (AZT)
  - Summer (DST): UTC+5 (AZT)

Xəlilli is a village and municipality in the Ismailli Rayon of Azerbaijan. It has a population of 320.
