= Xəlilli, Jalilabad =

Xəlilli
- Municipality
- Location within Azerbaijan
- Coordinates: 39°09′51″N 48°27′14″E
- Country: Azerbaijan
- Rayon: Jalilabad
- Time zone: UTC+4 (AZT)

Xəlilli (also, Khalilli and Xillili) is a village and municipality in the Jalilabad Rayon of Azerbaijan.
