= Hossein Khalili =

- Born: November 24, 1956 (age 69); Varamin, Tehran, Pahlavi Iran
- Military career
- Allegiance: Pahlavi Iran / Islamic Republic of Iran
- Branch: Imperial Iranian Armed Forces / Islamic Republic of Iran Air Force
- Service years: 1974-2000
- Rank: Second brigadier general (Iran)
- Conflicts: Iran–Iraq War

Hossein Khalili (born November 24, 1956, in Varamin) is a former Northrop F-5 and Grumman F-14 Tomcat pilot and brigadier general in the IImperial Iranian Armed Forces and the Islamic Republic of Iran Air Force.

Together with Behrooz NaqdiBeyk, he was one of the youngest fighter pilots of this force since the beginning of the Iran-Iraq war. With more than 2,000 hours of non-random flight over Iraq, he is one of the luckiest pilots in the history of air warfare. Khalili is currently a senior adviser to Nahaja and a senior member of the Air Force Studies Center.

== Military records ==
He completed his secondary education in Varamin and entered the pilot school at the age of 18, and in 1975 he was sent to the United States to complete a two-year pilot training course. In 1977 he flew a Northrop F-5 at Dezful base, and in early 1957 he was transferred to Tabriz base as a fighter pilot.

Khalili was one of the youngest pilots to fly a fighter jet in the United States. He was a 24-year-old pilot with the rank of first lieutenant at the beginning of the Iran-Iraq war, and along with a number of other pilots, passed the F-14 Tomcat training course in 1981. The Army Air Force has officially named him the youngest pilot in the front seat of the Tomcat during the war and the luckiest fighter pilot.
