= Wadgera, Yadgir =

Wadgera Vadgera, Vadagera
- Town
- Location in Karnataka, India
- Coordinates: 16°35′11″N 77°05′54″E
- Country: India
- State: Karnataka
- District: Yadgir
- Taluka: Wadgera
- Established: 2017

Government
  - Type: Panchayati raj (India)
  - Body: Town panchayat
- Elevation: 383 m (1,257 ft)

Population (2011)
  - Total: 9,091+

Languages
  - Official: Kannada
- Time zone: UTC+5:30 (IST)
- Postal code: 585355
- ISO 3166 code: IN-KA
- Vehicle registration: KA
- Website: karnataka.gov.in

Wadgera is a Town panchayat in the southern state of Karnataka, India. Administratively, Wadgera is under the Wadgera Taluka of Yadgir district in Karnataka. Wadgera is 23 km by road south of the town of Yadgir and 39 km by road southeast of the town of Shahapur. The nearest rail station is Narayanpet Road Station and the nearest railhead is in Yadgir.

There is one village in the gram panchayat: Wadgera.

== Demographics ==
As of 2001 India census, Wadgera had a population of 7,349 with 3,652 males and 3,697 females.

== Education ==
The government pre-university college at Wadgera has twice been shifted away to other locales.

== Industry ==
A 20 MW Solar power plant was constructed at Wadgera in 2018 by Mahindra Susten Pvt. Ltd. It was owned by Hero Future Energies Ltd.
