= Halil (musical instrument) =

Ancient Jewish reed instrument

A halil is an ancient Jewish reed instrument. It is similar to the Greek aulos. The instrument is mentioned in the Hebrew Bible or Old Testament in 1 Samuel 10:5, 1 Kings 1: 40, Isaiah 5:12, Isaiah 30:29, and Jeremiah 48:36. . Modern English-language editions of the Bible usually translate it as flute or pipe. However, the text of the Septuagint, Vulgate, and Talmud all indicate that the instrument was likely a double (a modern equivalent would be an oboe) or single reed instrument (a modern equivalent would be a clarinet). Most musicologists accept this interpretation. However, some scholars believe the term halil was a word that was used collectively for all wind instruments based on text from the Jerusalem Talmud. The halil is also referred to in the Mishnah.
