= Tumkur, Wadgera =

Tumkur Tumakura
- Village
- Location within Karnataka Location within India
- Coordinates: 16°30′44″N 077°05′15″E
- Country: India
- State: Karnataka
- District: Yadgir
- Taluka: Wadgera

Government
  - Type: Panchayati raj (India)
  - Body: Gram panchayat

Area
  - Total: 39.962 km^{2} (15.429 sq mi)

Population (2011)
  - Total: 3,245

Languages
  - Official: Kannada
- Time zone: UTC+5:30 (IST)
- PIN: 585355
- ISO 3166 code: IN-KA
- Vehicle registration: KA 33
- Website: karnataka.gov.in

Tumkur is a gram panchayat village in the southern state of Karnataka, India. Administratively, it is under Wadgera Taluka of Yadgir district in Karnataka. It is on the east bank of the Krishna River. Tumkur is 10 km by road northwest of the village of Bendebembli and 31 km by road south of the town of Yadgir. The nearest rail station is Chegunda Station and the nearest railhead is in Yadgir. As a gram panchayat it oversees the villages of Itga Simt Wadgera and Habshihal.

== Demographics ==
At the 2001 census, Tumkur had 2,743 inhabitants, with 1,332 males and 1,411 females.
