= Wadgera Taluka =

Wadgera Taluka Wadagera Taluka Vadagera Taluk ವಡಗೇರಾ ತಾಲ್ಲೂಕು
- taluka
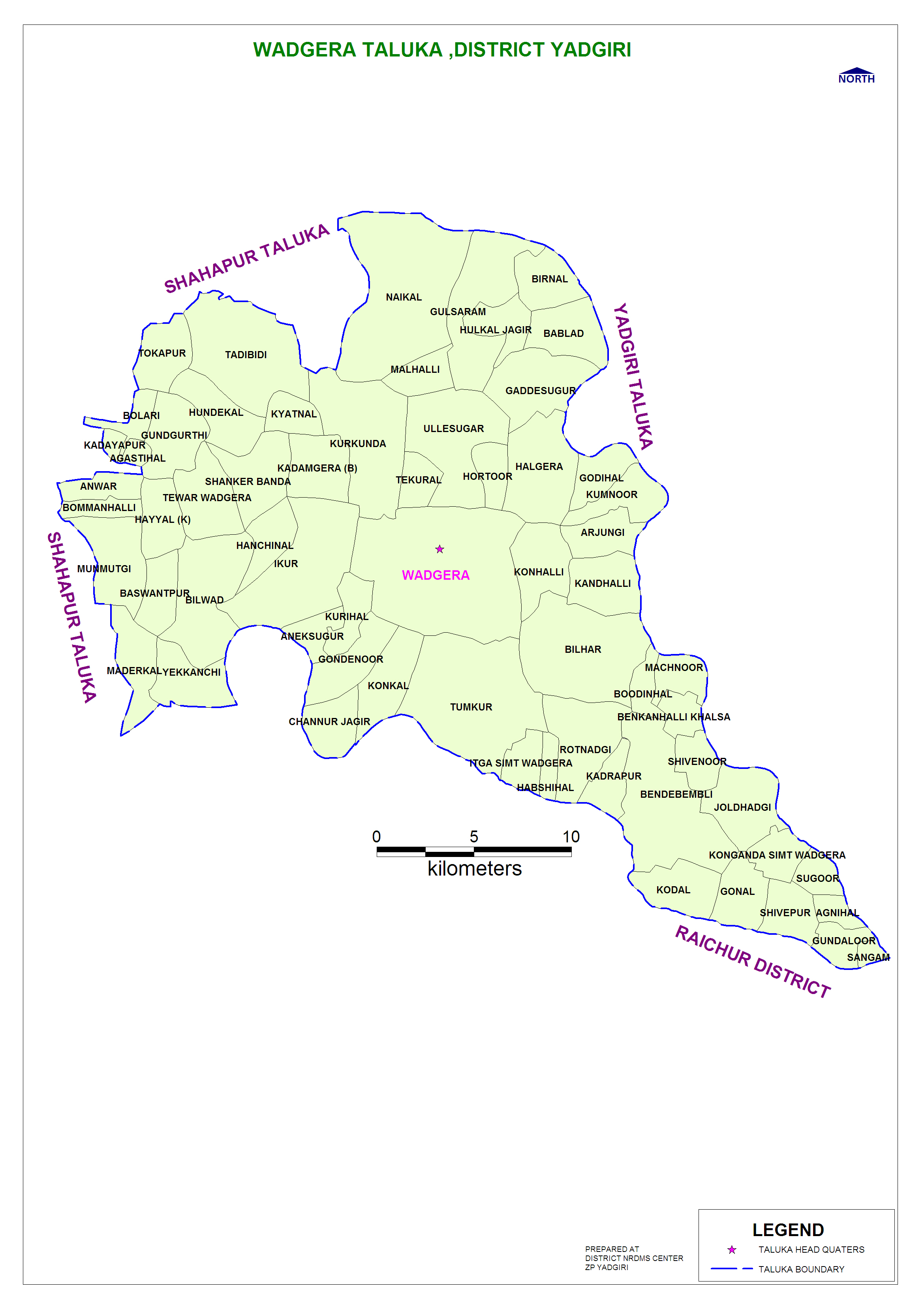
- Wadagera Taluka Map

- Location in Karnataka, India
- Coordinates: 16°35′11″N 77°05′54″E
- Country: India
- State: Karnataka
- District: Yadgir

Government
  - Type: Panchayati raj (India)
  - Body: Taluka panchayat
- Elevation: 383 m (1,257 ft)

Population (2001)
  - Total: 7,349

Languages
  - Official: Kannada
- Time zone: UTC+5:30 (IST)
- Postal code: 585355
- ISO 3166 code: IN-KA
- Vehicle registration: KA 33
- Website: karnataka.gov.in

Wadgera is a taluka panchayat in the southern state of Karnataka, India. Administratively, Wadgera is in the Yadgir district in Karnataka. It was created 2017 out of the southern portion of Shahapur Taluka. The administrative center is the village of Wadgera, 23 km by road south of the City of Yadgir and 39 km by road southeast of the town of Shahapur. The nearest rail station and the nearest railhead are in Yadgir.

== Demographics ==
As of 2001 India census, its chief village Wadgera had a population of 7,349 with 3,652 males and 3,697 females; however, there has not been a census since the taluka was created.

== Education ==
The government pre-university college at Wadgera has twice been shifted away to other locales.

== Economics ==
A 20 MW Solar power plant was constructed at Wadgera in 2018 by Mahindra Susten Pvt. Ltd. It was owned by Hero Future Energies Ltd.

== Towns and villages ==
Wadgera is the main village in the taluka. There are 63 other villages, 18 of which are also gram panchayat villages. In addition there are 55 rural habitations that don't arise to village status. The gram panchayat villages include:

- Aikur
- Bendebembli
- Bilar
- Gonal
- Gulsaram
- Gundgurthi
- Hayyal (B)
- Halgera
- Kadamgera B
- Konkal
- Kurkunda
- Naikal
- Tewar Wadagera
- Tumkur
- Tadabidi
- Ullesugar
- Wadgera
