= Khalil =

Khalil, Khelil, or Khaleel may refer to:

== People ==
- Khalil (Pashtun tribe)
- Khalil al-Hayya (born 1960), Palestinian politician and lecturer
- Kahlil Gibran (1883–1931), Lebanese-American writer, poet, visual artist, and Lebanese nationalist
- Khalil (scholar), 19th century Islamic scholar in the Emirate of Harar
- DJ Khalil (born 1973), American hip hop and soul music producer
- Khalil (name), a surname or personal name of multiple individuals and families
- Khalil Mack (born 1991), NFL linebacker for the Los Angeles Chargers
- Khalil "Red" Murdock (born 2003), NFL linebacker for the Denver Broncos
- Khalil Ullah Khan (1934–2014), Bangladesh actor
- Khalil Rabah (born 1961) multidisciplinary, installation artist
- Robert "Bob" Khaleel, American hip hop musician better known as Bronx Style Bob

== Places ==
=== Algeria ===
- Khelil, Algeria, town and commune in Bordj Bou Arréridj Province, Algeria
- Sidi Khellil, town and commune in El M'Ghair District, El Oued Province, Algeria
- Aïn Ben Khelil, a town and commune in district of Mécheria, Naâma Province, Algeria

=== Iran ===
- Halil River, also Haliri River or Zar Dasht River in its upper reaches, a river in the Jiroft and Kahnuj districts of Kerman Province, Iran
- Khalil Kord, a village in Iran
- Khalil, alternate name of Qaleh-ye Khalileh, a village in Iran
- Qaleh-ye Khalil, a village in Khuzestan Province, Iran
- Halil Rural District, in Kerman Province, Iran

=== Palestine ===
- Al-Khalil, the Arabic name of Hebron

== Music ==
- Khalil (band), R&B band from South Africa
- Khalil (singer) (born 1994), singer from California

== See also ==
- Halil, a given name
- Jalil (disambiguation), including Calil
- Khalili (disambiguation)
