= Bonal, Karnataka =

Bonal Bonhal
- Village
- Location within Karnataka Location within India
- Coordinates: 16°30′54″N 076°39′20″E
- Country: India
- State: Karnataka
- District: Yadgir district
- Taluka: Shorapur

Government
  - Type: Panchayat raj
  - Body: Gram panchayat

Languages
  - Official: Kannada
- Time zone: UTC+5:30 (IST)
- PIN: 585290
- ISO 3166 code: IN-KA
- Vehicle registration: KA
- Website: karnataka.gov.in

Bonal, is a village in the southern state of Karnataka, India. Administratively, Bonal is under Aldal gram panchayat, Shorapur Taluka of Yadgir District in Karnataka. The village of Bonal is 6 km by road east-southeast of the village of Wagingera and 4 km by road west-northwest of the village of Chikanhalli. The nearest railhead is in Yadgir.

The Bonal Bird Sanctuary is located about a kilometer north of the village.

== Demographics ==
At the 2001 census, Bonal had 1,928 inhabitants, with 970 males and 958 females.
