= Agthirth =

- Village
- Location within Karnataka Location within India
- Coordinates: 16°33′47″N 076°28′52″E
- Country: India
- State: Karnataka
- District: Yadgir district
- Taluka: Shorapur

Government
  - Type: Panchayat raj
  - Body: Gram panchayat

Languages
  - Official: Kannada
- Time zone: UTC+5:30 (IST)
- ISO 3166 code: IN-KA
- Vehicle registration: KA
- Website: karnataka.gov.in

Agthirth (or Agtheertha) is a village in the southern state of Karnataka, India. Administratively, it is under Agni gram panchayat, Shorapur Taluka of Yadgir District in Karnataka. Agthirth is 1.5 km by road east of the village of Agni, and 8.5 km by road west of the village of Baichbal.

== See also ==
- Yadgir
