= Vanadurga Fort =

Vanadurga Fort ವನದುರ್ಗ ಕೋಟೆ Wanadurga Fort
- Village
- Location within Karnataka
- Coordinates: 16°37′53.12″N 76°41′35.87″E
- Country: India
- State: Karnataka
- District: Yadgir district

Government
  - Type: Panchayat raj
  - Body: Gram panchayat

Languages
  - Official: Kannada
- Time zone: UTC+5:30 (IST)
- PIN: 585309
- Telephone code: 085XX
- ISO 3166 code: IN-KA
- Vehicle registration: KA-33
- Website: karnataka.gov.in

Vanadurga Fort also spelled as Wanadurga Fort (Kannada: ವನದುರ್ಗ ಕೋಟೆ) lies in Vanadurga village in Shahapur taluk of Yadgir district in Karnataka state, India. Vanadurga Fort was built by the Shorapur dynasty. Vanadurga village is west of Shahapur and north of Shorapur.

== See also ==
- Yadgir Fort
- Shahapur, Karnataka
- Bonal Bird Sanctuary
- Shorapur
- Yadgir
- Gulbarga
