= Agni, Karnataka =

Agni
- Village
- Location within Karnataka Location within India
- Coordinates: 16°33′51″N 076°28′08″E
- Country: India
- State: Karnataka
- District: Yadgir district
- Taluka: Shorapur

Government
  - Type: Panchayat raj
  - Body: Gram panchayat

Population (2011)
  - Total: 2,233

Languages
  - Official: Kannada
- Time zone: UTC+5:30 (IST)
- PIN: 585216
- ISO 3166 code: IN-KA
- Vehicle registration: KA
- Website: karnataka.gov.in

Agni is a panchayat village in the southern state of Karnataka, India. Administratively, Agni is under Shorapur Taluka of Yadgir District in Karnataka. The village of Agni is 1.5 km by road west of the village of Agthirth and 14 km by road north of the village of Hunasagi. The nearest railhead is in Yadgir.

There are eight villages in the gram panchayat: Agni, Agthirth, Amlihal, Badlapur-Becharak, Bendartalhalli, Handral, Huvinhalli, and Karibhavi.

== Demographics ==
As of 2001 census, the village of Agni had 1,920 inhabitants, with 926 males and 994 females.

As of 2011 census, the village of Agni had a population of 2,233.
