= Sleeping Buddha Hill =

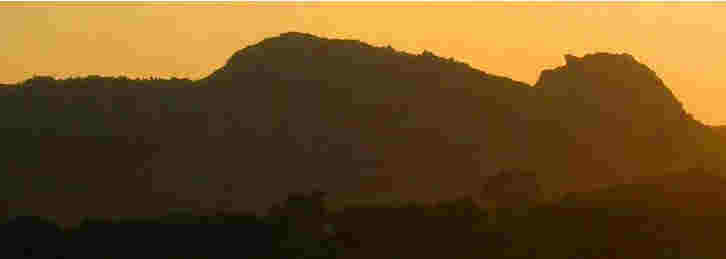
- Sleeping Buddha Hill

- Location within Karnataka
- Coordinates: 16°41′26″N 76°50′0″E
- Country: India
- State: Karnataka
- District: Yadgir district

Languages
  - Official: Kannada
- Time zone: UTC+5:30 (IST)
- 08479: 585223
- Vehicle registration: KA-33

Sleeping Buddha Hill is located near Shahapur town Shahapur taluk of Yadgir district in Karnataka state, India. The hill is made up of 4 small hills that gives the impression of Sleeping Buddha when viewed horizontally in Southwest direction. Sleeping Buddha Hill lies between Bheemarayanagudi and Shahapur and Karnataka State highway 16 passes near to the hill. It is one of the main attractions of Shahapur town, along with Chara Basaveshwara Temple.

== See also ==
- Yadgir Fort
- Lumbini Park Yadgir
- Shahapur, Karnataka
- Bonal Bird Sanctuary
- Shorapur
- Yadgir
- Gulbarga
