= Devapur, Yadgir =

Devapur
- village
- Location in Karnataka, India Devapur (India)
- Coordinates: 16°29′10″N 076°43′42″E
- Country: India
- State: Karnataka
- District: Yadgir
- Taluka: Shorapur
- Talukas: Shorapur

Government
  - Body: Village panchayat

Population (2011)
  - Total: 4,421

Languages
  - Official: Kannada
- Time zone: UTC+5:30 (IST)
- Postal code: 585290
- ISO 3166 code: IN-KA
- Vehicle registration: KA
- Website: karnataka.gov.in

Devapur is a panchayat village in the southern state of Karnataka, India. Administratively, Devapur is under Shorapur Taluka of Yadgir District in Karnataka. The village of Devapur is 15 km by road west of the village of Sugur and 26 km by road east of the village of Hunasagi. The nearest railhead is in Yadgir.

There are six villages in the gram panchayat: Devapur, Aralhalli, Kagarhal, Kampapur, Mushtalli, and Shalgi.

== Demographics ==
As of 2001 census, the village of Devapur had 3,872 inhabitants, with 1,973 males and 1,899 females.

As of 2011 census, the village of Devapur had a population of 4,421.
