= Hagaratagi =

- Village
- Nicknames: Parigeta naadu, Hagaru Ittige
- Location in Karnataka, India
- Coordinates: 16.398959°N 76.3633651°E
- Country: India
- State: karnataka
- District: Yadagiri
- Lok Sabha Constituency: Raichur
- Elevation: 383 m (1,257 ft)

Population (2011)
  - Total: 2,920

Languages
  - Official: ಕನ್ನಡ
- Time zone: UTC+5:30 (IST)
- PIN: 585237
- Telephone code: 08443
- Vehicle registration: KA 33

Hagaratagi is a historic village in Shorapur Taluk in Yadgir District of Karnataka State, India. It belongs to Gulbarga Division. It is located 60 km from Shorapur, 110 km towards the west from its district headquarters Yadgir and 473 km from its state capital Bengaluru.

Hagaratagi Pin code is 585237 and postal head office is Kodekal.

Hagaratagi is surrounded by Budihal, Kodekal and Talikoti

The total geographical area of village is 3636.25 hectares. Hagaratagi has a total population of 2,920 peoples. There are about 536 houses in Hagratagi village. Talikote is nearest town to Hagratagi which is 18 km away.

Hagaratgi village is known for its historical background. It was ruled by Kalyani Chalukyas. Once upon a time it was capital for surrounding small villages. It was called by the name Parigeta Nadu in olden days. Village is surrounded by number of temples. People of Hagaratgi worship them with Names like Bhima temple, Arjuna temple, Kunti temple. Shri Dharmaraja is widely worshipped with annual Rathotsava on 5th day after Yugadi.

Hagaratagi has its own Gram Panchayat including Budihal, Karekal and Horatti villages. Hagaratagi village has extensive area of agriculture land with a little area covered with irrigation. Politically village has its own significance.
