= Kanhalli =

Kanhalli kannelli
- Village
- Location within Karnataka Location within India
- Coordinates: 16°33′24″N 076°36′00″E
- Country: India
- State: Karnataka
- District: Yadgir district
- Taluka: Hunasagi

Government
  - Type: Panchayati raj (India)
  - Body: Gram panchayat

Population (2001)
  - Total: 2,965

Languages
  - Official: Kannada
- Time zone: UTC+5:30 (IST)
- PIN: 585290
- ISO 3166 code: IN-KA
- Vehicle registration: KA
- Website: karnataka.gov.in

Kanhalli is a village in the southern state of Karnataka, India. Administratively, Kanhalli is under Baichabal gram panchayat, Hunasagi Taluka of Yadgir District in Karnataka. The village of Kanhalli is 2.3 km by road east of the village of Baichbal and 9 km by road west of the village of Peth Ammapur. The nearest railhead is in Yadgir.

== Demographics ==
As of 2001 census, the village of Kanhalli had 2,965 inhabitants, with 1,496 males and 1,469 females.
