= Kachaknoor =

Kachakanoor
- Village
- Location within Karnataka Location within India
- Coordinates: 16°31′28″N 076°35′22″E
- Country: India
- State: Karnataka
- District: Yadgir district
- Taluka: Shorapur

Government
  - Type: Panchayati raj (India)
  - Body: Gram panchayat
- Elevation: 411 m (1,348 ft)

Population (2001)
  - Total: 1,253

Languages
  - Official: Kannada
- Time zone: UTC+5:30 (IST)
- ISO 3166 code: IN-KA
- Vehicle registration: KA
- Website: karnataka.gov.in

Kachakanoor is a panchayat village in the southern state of Karnataka, India. Administratively, Kachakanoor is under Shorapur Taluka of Yadgir District in Karnataka. The village of Kachakanoor is 5 km by road east of the village of Yedhalli and 13 km by road west of the village of Peth Ammapur. The nearest railhead is in Yadgir.

There are five villages in the gram panchayat: Kachaknoor, Bachimatti, Benkanhalli, Chikanhalli, and Kurbantalhalli post Kannelli .

== Demographics ==
At the 2001 census, the village of Kachakanoor had 1,253 inhabitants, with 610 males and 643 females.
