= Aldhal, Shorapur =

Aldhal
- Village
- Location within Karnataka Location within India
- Coordinates: 16°27′44″N 076°42′17″E
- Country: India
- State: Karnataka
- District: Yadgir district
- Taluka: Shorapur

Government
  - Type: Panchayati raj (India)
  - Body: Gram panchayat

Population (2001)
  - Total: 2,048

Languages
  - Official: Kannada
- Time zone: UTC+5:30 (IST)
- ISO 3166 code: IN-KA
- Vehicle registration: KA
- Website: karnataka.gov.in

Aldhal, is a panchayat village in the southern state of Karnataka, India. Administratively, Aldhal is under Shorapur Taluka of Yadgir District in Karnataka. The village of Aldhal is 12 km by road southwest of the town of Shorapur and 27 km by road east of the village of Wajjal. The nearest railhead is in Yadgir.

There are eight villages in the Aldal gram panchayat: Aldhal, Bonal, Gonal, Handral, Havinhal, Mangihal, Nagaral and Rajapur (D).

== Demographics ==
At the 2001 census, the village of Aldhal had 2,048 inhabitants, with 1,012 males and 1,036 females.
