= Mailapura, Shorapur =

Mailapura Mailapur
- Village
- Country: India
- State: Karnataka
- District: Yadgir district
- Taluka: Shorapur

Government
  - Type: Panchayat raj
  - Body: Gram panchayat

Languages
  - Official: Kannada
- Time zone: UTC+5:30 (IST)
- ISO 3166 code: IN-KA
- Vehicle registration: KA
- Website: karnataka.gov.in

Mailapura is a village in Marnal panchayat, Shorapur taluka, Yadgir district in Karnataka state, India. The nearest railhead is in Yadgir.

== Demographics ==
At the 2001 census, Mailapura had 874 inhabitants, with 429 males and 445 females.
