= Kodalgi =

Kodalgi Kudalagi
- Village
- Location within Karnataka Location within India
- Coordinates: 16°34′33″N 076°34′07″E
- Country: India
- State: Karnataka
- District: Yadgir district
- Taluka: Shorapur

Government
  - Type: Panchayati raj (India)
  - Body: Gram panchayat

Languages
  - Official: Kannada
- Time zone: UTC+5:30 (IST)
- PIN: 585290 Baichbal
- Telephone code: 08443
- ISO 3166 code: IN-KA
- Vehicle registration: KA
- Website: karnataka.gov.in

Kudalagi is a village in the southern state of Karnataka, India. Administratively, Kodalgi is under Baichabal gram panchayat, Shorapur Taluka of Yadgir District in Karnataka. The village of Kodalgi is 2.3 km by road north of the village of Baichbal and 15 km by road south of the village of Kembhavi. The nearest railhead is in Yadgir.

== Demographics ==
As of 2001 census, Kodalgi had 1,916 inhabitants, with 975 males and 941 females.

== Etymology ==
The name Kudalagi comes from two ditches are joined at this place and which are coming from Kembhavi and Karadakal. This village have lot of historical fanes

- Baba Maharaj temple
- Ramajogitemple (Koodaligeppa)
- Hanuman temple
- Gramadevate temple
