= Chikanhalli =

- Village
- Location within Karnataka Location within India
- Coordinates: 16°30′25″N 076°37′37″E
- Country: India
- State: Karnataka
- District: Yadgir district
- Taluka: Shorapur

Government
  - Type: Panchayati raj (India)
  - Body: Gram panchayat
- Elevation: 406 m (1,332 ft)

Population (2001)
  - Total: 1,659

Languages
  - Official: Kannada
- Time zone: UTC+5:30 (IST)
- PIN: 562130
- ISO 3166 code: IN-KA
- Vehicle registration: KA
- Website: karnataka.gov.in

Chikanhalli, is a village in the southern state of Karnataka, India. Administratively, Chikanhalli is under Kachaknoor gram panchayat, Shorapur Taluka of Yadgir District in Karnataka. The village of Chikanhalli is 4 km by road east-southeast of the village of Bonal and 17 km by road northwest of the village of Hunasagi. The nearest railhead is in Yadgir.

== Demographics ==
As of 2001 census, Chikanhalli had 1,659 inhabitants, with 860 males and 799 females.
