= Wajjal =

Wajjal Wajal, Vajjal
- Village
- Location within Karnataka Location within India
- Coordinates: 16°28′18″N 076°32′53″E
- Country: India
- State: Karnataka
- District: Yadgir district
- Taluka: Shorapur

Government
  - Body: Gram panchayat
- Elevation: 439 m (1,440 ft)

Languages
  - Official: Kannada
- Time zone: UTC+5:30 (IST)
- PIN: 585215
- ISO 3166 code: IN-KA
- Vehicle registration: KA
- Website: karnataka.gov.in

Wajjal is a village in the Shorapur taluk of Yadgir district in Karnataka state, India. Wajjal is 4 km by road east of Hunasagi. The nearest railhead is in Yadgir.

== Demographics ==
As of 2001 census, Wajjal had 3,495 inhabitants, with 1,744 males and 1,751 females.

== See also ==
- Shorapur (taluka headquarters)
- Yadgir (district headquarters)
