= Sugur, Yadgir =

Sugur
- Village
- Location within Karnataka Location within India
- Coordinates: 16°26′21″N 076°49′01″E
- Country: India
- State: Karnataka
- District: Yadgir district
- Taluqa: Sholapur

Government
  - Type: Panchayati raj (India)
  - Body: Gram panchayat

Population (2011)
  - Total: 1,182

Languages
  - Official: Kannada
- Time zone: UTC+5:30 (IST)
- PIN: 585290
- ISO 3166 code: IN-KA
- Vehicle registration: KA
- Website: karnataka.gov.in

Sugur is a panchayat village in the southern state of Karnataka, India. Administratively, Sugur is under Shorapur Taluqa of Yadgir District in Karnataka. Sugur lies on the left (north) bank of the Krishna River. The village of Sugur is 3 km by road southwest of the village of Adwadgi and 15 km by road east of the village of Devapur. The nearest railhead is in Yadgir.

There are eight villages in the gram panchayat: Sugur, Adwadgi, Bevinhal, Chandlapur, Choudeshwarhal, Hemwadgi, Karnal, and Kupgal.

== Demographics ==
As of 2001 census, the village of Sugur had 1,004 inhabitants, with 474 males and 530 females.

In the 2011 census, the village of Sugur had a population of 1,182.
