= Thangunda =

Thanagunda Thanagundi
- Village
- Location within Karnataka Location within India
- Coordinates: 16°47′45″N 077°03′16″E
- Country: India
- State: Karnataka
- District: Yadagiri district
- Taluka: Yadagiri

Government
  - Type: Panchayati raj (India)
  - Body: Gram panchayat

Population (2001)
  - Total: 2,057

Languages
  - Official: Kannada
- Time zone: UTC+5:30 (IST)
- ISO 3166 code: IN-KA
- Vehicle registration: KA
- Website: karnataka.gov.in

Thangunda is a panchayat village in the southern state of Karnataka, India. Administratively, Thangunda is under Yadgir Taluka of Yadgir District in Karnataka. The village of Thangunda is 12 km by road northwest of the town of Yadgir. The nearest rail station is Thangunda Railway Station two kilometres to the east, while the nearest railhead is in Yadgir.

There are five villages in the gram panchayat: Thangunda, Bomshathalli, Hedgimadra, Talak, and Viswaspur.

== Demographics ==
As of 2001 census, the village of Thangunda had 2,057 inhabitants, with 1,027 males and 1,030 females.
