= Marnal =

Marnal Maranal
- Village
- Location within Karnataka Location within India
- Coordinates: 16°19′14″N 076°20′51″E
- Country: India
- State: Karnataka
- District: Yadgir district
- Taluka: Shorapur

Government
  - Type: Panchayati raj (India)
  - Body: Gram panchayat

Languages
  - Official: Kannada
- Time zone: UTC+5:30 (IST)
- ISO 3166 code: IN-KA
- Vehicle registration: KA
- Website: karnataka.gov.in

Marnal (Maranal) is a panchayat village in Shorapur taluka of Yadgir district in Karnataka state, India. Marnal is 4 km southwest of Bardevanhal. The nearest railhead is in Yadgir.

There are six villages in the Marnal gram panchayat: Marnal, Bassapur, Kamalpur, Mailapur, Mudilinganhal, and Yenniwadgera.

== Demographics ==
As of 2001 census, Marnal had 1,137 inhabitants, with 559 males and 578 females.
