= Mailapura, Yadgir =

Mailapur
- Village
- Location within Karnataka Location within India
- Coordinates: 16°44′22″N 77°14′32″E
- Country: India
- State: Karnataka
- District: Yadgir district

Languages
  - Official: Kannada
- Time zone: UTC+5:30 (IST)
- PIN: 585321
- Telephone code: 085XX
- Vehicle registration: KA-33
- Website: mailapur

Mailapur, is a village in Yadgir taluk of Yadgir district in Karnataka state, India. Mailapura is a holy place. Sri Mailapur Mailaralingeshwara Temple is located in the village. Mailapura village is located 17 kilometres (11 mi) east of Yadgir. It is religious place of lakhs of devotees. In this village, they celebrate two Jatras per year namely as deepavali and makara sankramana.

== Demographics ==
As of 2001 census, Mailapur had 1,497 inhabitants, with 789 males and 708 females.

== See also ==
- Shahapur, Karnataka
- Bonal Bird Sanctuary
- Shorapur
- Yadgir
