= Jogandabhavi =

- Village
- Location within Karnataka Location within India
- Coordinates: 16°17′59″N 076°21′46″E
- Country: India
- State: Karnataka
- District: Yadgir district
- Taluka: Shorapur

Government
  - Type: Panchayati raj (India)
  - Body: Gram panchayat

Languages
  - Official: Kannada
- Time zone: UTC+5:30 (IST)
- PIN: 585237
- ISO 3166 code: IN-KA
- Vehicle registration: KA
- Website: karnataka.gov.in

Jogandabhavi is a panchayat village in Shorapur taluka of Yadgir district in Karnataka state, India. Jogandabhavi is 8.5 km south-southwest of Kodekal. The nearest railhead is in Yadgir.

The sub-villages of Jogandabhavi village are: Belligundi tanda, Basirigid tanda, Doddachepi tanda, Gaddad tanda, Laxmikeri tanda, and Sanachepi tanda.

There are five villages in the Jogandabhavi gram panchayat: Jogandabhavi, Ammapur (S.K), Hullikera, Kotigud, and Rayangola.

== Demographics ==
As of 2001 census, Jogandabhavi had 2,615 inhabitants, with 1,308 males and 1,307 females.
