= Wagingera =

- Village
- Location within Karnataka Location within India
- Coordinates: 16°31′20″N 76°41′57″E
- Country: India
- State: Karnataka
- District: Yadgir district

Government
  - Body: Gram panchayat

Languages
  - Official: Kannada
- Time zone: UTC+5:30 (IST)
- PIN: 585290
- Telephone code: 085XX
- ISO 3166 code: IN-KA
- Vehicle registration: KA-33
- Website: karnataka.gov.in

Wagingera is a village in the Shorapur taluka of Yadgir district in Karnataka state, India. Wagingera is famous for its fort that played decisive role during the Siege of Wagingera. Wagingera Fort is 5 km west of Shorapur city.

== Demographics ==
As of 2001 census, Wagingera had 2,757 inhabitants, with 1,368 males and 1,389 females.

== See also ==
- Bonal Bird Sanctuary
- Shorapur
- Yadgir
- Shahapur, Karnataka
- Siege of Wagingera
