= Adwadgi =

- village
- Location in Karnataka, India Adwadgi (India)
- Coordinates: 16°27′10″N 076°50′14″E
- Country: India
- State: Karnataka
- District: Yadgir
- Taluka: Shorapur
- Gram panchayat: Sugooru

Government
  - Type: Panchayat raj
  - Body: Village Panchayat

Population (2011)
  - Total: 1,024

Languages
  - Official: Kannada
- Time zone: UTC+5:30 (IST)
- ISO 3166 code: IN-KA
- Vehicle registration: KA
- Civic agency: Village Panchayat
- Website: karnataka.gov.in

Adwadgi is a village in the southern state of Karnataka, India. Administratively, Adwadgi is under Sugooru gram panchayat, Shorapur Taluka of Yadgir district in Karnataka. The village of Adwadgi is 3 km (1.9 mi) by road northeast of the village of Sugur and 7.5 km (4.7 mi) by road south of the village of Hemnoor. The nearest railhead is in Yadgir.

== Demographics ==
In the 2001 census, Adwadgi had 646 inhabitants, with 319 males and 327 females.

In the 2011 census, Adwadgi had a population of 1024.

== See also ==
- Yadgir
