= Baichbal =

- Village
- Location within Karnataka Location within India
- Coordinates: 16°33′20″N 076°33′58″E
- Country: India
- State: Karnataka
- District: Yadgir district
- Taluka: Shorapur

Government
  - Type: Panchayati raj (India)
  - Body: Gram panchayat

Population (2001)
  - Total: 1,947

Languages
  - Official: Kannada
- Time zone: UTC+5:30 (IST)
- PIN: 585290
- ISO 3166 code: IN-KA
- Vehicle registration: KA
- Website: karnataka.gov.in

Baichbal, is a panchayat village in the Northern state of Karnataka, India. Administratively, Baichbal is under Shorapur Taluka of Yadgir District in Karnataka. The village of Baichbal is 2.3 km by road south of the village of Kodalgi and 2.3 km by road west of the village of Kanhalli. The town of Shorapur is east about 25 km by road via Peth Ammapur or 37 km by the better roads. The nearest railhead is in Yadgir.

There are three villages in the gram panchayat: Baichbal, Kodalgi, and Kanhalli.

== Demographics ==
At the 2001 census, the village of Baichbal had 1,947 inhabitants, with 1017 males and 930 females.
