= Konkal, Yadgir =

Konkal
- Village
- Location within Karnataka Location within India
- Coordinates: 16°44′11″N 077°22′54″E
- Country: India
- State: Karnataka
- District: Yadgir district
- Taluka: Yadgir

Government
  - Type: Panchayati raj (India)
  - Body: Gram panchayat

Population (2001)
  - Total: 4,214

Languages
  - Official: Kannada
- Time zone: UTC+5:30 (IST)
- ISO 3166 code: IN-KA
- Vehicle registration: KA
- Website: karnataka.gov.in

Konkal is a panchayat village in the southern state of Karnataka, India. Administratively, Konkal is under Yadgir Taluka of Yadgir District in Karnataka. The village of Konkal is 5 km by road south of the village of Chinakhar, and 6 km by road east of the village of Yelahar. The nearest railhead is in Yadgir.

There are three villages in the gram panchayat: Konkal, Devanalli, and Nandepalli.

== Demographics ==
As of 2001 census, the village of Konkal had 4,214 inhabitants, with 2,074 males and 2,140 females.
