= Bardevanhal =

Bardevanhal Baradevanal
- Village
- Location within Karnataka Location within India
- Coordinates: 16°20′32″N 076°22′21″E
- Country: India
- State: Karnataka
- District: Yadgir district
- Taluka: Shorapur

Government
  - Type: Panchayati raj (India)
  - Body: Gram panchayat
- Elevation: 464 m (1,522 ft)

Languages
  - Official: Kannada
- Time zone: UTC+5:30 (IST)
- ISO 3166 code: IN-KA
- Vehicle registration: KA
- Website: karnataka.gov.in

Bardevanhal (Baradevanal), is a panchayat village in Shorapur taluka of Yadgir district in Karnataka state, India. Bardevanhal is 4 km southwest of Kodekal, across the Dhon River. The nearest railhead is in Yadgir.

== Demographics ==
As of 2001 census, Bardevanhal had 2,255 inhabitants, with 1,154 males and 1,101 females.
