= Raja Venkatappa Naik =

Indian politician

Raja Venkatappa Naik (1960 – 25 February 2024) was an Indian politician from Karnataka. He was an MLA from Shorapur Assembly constituency which is reserved for ST community in Yadgir district. He represented Indian National Congress Party and won the 2023 Karnataka Legislative Assembly election.

He was appointed chairman of the Karnataka State Warehousing Corporation on 26 January 2024.

== Early life and education ==
Naik was from Shorapur, also known as Surpur, Yadgir district. He was born to Raja Kumar Naik, a two time Congress MLA. He married Rani Lata Naik and they have two sons, Raja Venugopal Naik and Raja Santosh Naik. He did his MBBS at MR Medical College Gulbarga but discontinued in 1981. Earlier, he passed pre university course in 1979 from Nuthana Vidyalaya Junior College, Kalaburagi. His son, Venugopal Naik, won the by election and retained his father's seat.

== Career ==
Naik entered the Karnataka Legislative Assembly for the first in 1994 from Shorapur Assembly constituency representing Karnataka Congress Party. He later joined Congress and was re-elected in 1999. After losing twice in the next two elections, he regained the Shorapur seat on Congress ticket in the 2013 Karnataka Legislative Assembly election. He became MLA for the fourth time winning the 2023 Karnataka Legislative Assembly election representing Indian National Congress from Shorapur Assembly constituency. He polled 113,559 votes and defeated his nearest rival, Narasimha Nayak of Bharatiya Janata Party by a margin of 25,223 votes. Earlier in February, he was made the chairman of the Karnataka Warehouse Corporation.

=== Death ===
Naik died of heart attack on 25 February 2024 at Manipal hospital in Bangalore. He was recovering from a surgery for kidney stones and was admitted again before he suffered an attack. His body was taken to Surpur and his final rites were completed the next day.
