= Bhagyanagar, Yadgir =

Bhagyanagar
- Village
- Location within Karnataka Location within India
- Coordinates: 16°25′57″N 076°30′57″E
- Country: India
- State: Karnataka
- District: Yadgir district
- Taluka: Shorapur

Government
  - Body: Gram panchayat

Languages
  - Official: Kannada
- Time zone: UTC+5:30 (IST)
- ISO 3166 code: IN-KA
- Vehicle registration: KA
- Website: karnataka.gov.in

Bhagyanagar is a village in Shorapur (Surpur) taluka, Yadgir district, Karnataka, India.

== Demographics ==
At the 2001 census, Bhagyanagar had 630 inhabitants, 354 males and 276 females.
