= Gonal, Shorapur =

Gonal
- Village
- Location within Karnataka Location within India
- Coordinates: 16°27′50″N 076°41′15″E
- Country: India
- State: Karnataka
- District: Yadgir district
- Taluka: Shorapur

Government
  - Type: Panchayati raj (India)
  - Body: Gram panchayat

Population (2001)
  - Total: 634

Languages
  - Official: Kannada
- Time zone: UTC+5:30 (IST)
- ISO 3166 code: IN-KA
- Vehicle registration: KA
- Website: karnataka.gov.in

Gonal is a village in the southern state of Karnataka, India. Administratively, Gonal is under Aldal gram panchayat, Shorapur Taluka of Yadgir District in Karnataka. It lies on the left (north) bank of the Devapura Nala, a tributary of the Krishna River. The village of Gonal is 2.6 km by road east of the village of Aldhal and 15 km by road southeast of the town of Shorapur. The nearest railhead is in Yadgir.

In 2006, planning was started for a small dam (weir) and hydroelectric plant on the Devapura Nala at Gonal. The water impoundment area does not affect any farmland or structures.

== Demographics ==
As of 2001 census, Gonal had 634 inhabitants, with 330 males and 304 females.
