= Halgera, Yadgir =

Haligera Haligera
- Village
- Location within Karnataka Location within India
- Coordinates: 16°43′30″N 077°13′43″E
- Country: India
- State: Karnataka
- District: Yadgir district
- Taluka: Yadgir

Government
  - Type: Panchayati raj (India)
  - Body: Gram panchayat

Population (2001)
  - Total: 2,471

Languages
  - Official: Kannada
- Time zone: UTC+5:30 (IST)
- PIN: 585202
- ISO 3166 code: IN-KA
- Vehicle registration: KA
- Website: karnataka.gov.in

Haligera is a panchayat village in the southern state of Karnataka, India. Administratively, Halgera is under Yadgir Taluka of Yadgir District in Karnataka. The village of Halgera is 14 km by road southeast of the town of Yadgir and 6 km by road northeast of the village of Zinkera. The nearest railhead is in Yadgir.

There are three villages in the gram panchayat: Halgera, Maskehhalli, and Raisabad Hosahalli.

== Demographics ==
As of 2001 census, the village of Halgera had 2,471 inhabitants, with 1,272 males and 1,199 females.
