= Achola =

- village
- Location in Karnataka, India Achola (India)
- Coordinates: 16°50′44″N 076°59′48″E
- Country: India
- State: Karnataka
- District: Yadgir
- Taluka: Yadgir
- Gram panchayat: Akera B.

Government
  - Type: Panchayat raj
  - Body: Gram panchayat

Population (2001)
  - Total: 843

Languages
  - Official: Kannada
- Time zone: UTC+5:30 (IST)
- ISO 3166 code: IN-KA
- Vehicle registration: KA
- Website: karnataka.gov.in

Achola is a village in the southern state of Karnataka, India. Administratively, Achola is under Akera B. gram panchayat, Yadgir Taluka of Yadgir District in Karnataka.

== Demographics ==
As of 2001 India census, Achola had a population of 843 with 398 males and 445 females.

== See also ==
- Yadgir
