= Hattikuni =

- Village
- Location within Karnataka Location within India
- Coordinates: 16°51′02″N 077°09′15″E
- Country: India
- State: Karnataka
- District: Yadgir district
- Taluka: Yadgir

Government
  - Type: Panchayati raj (India)
  - Body: Gram panchayat

Population (2001)
  - Total: 5,056

Languages
  - Official: Kannada
- Time zone: UTC+5:30 (IST)
- PIN: 585202
- ISO 3166 code: IN-KA
- Vehicle registration: KA
- Website: karnataka.gov.in

Hattikuni is a panchayat village in the southern state of Karnataka, India. It is located in the Yadgir taluk of Yadgir district in Karnataka.

There are five villages in the gram panchayat: Hattikuni, Bachwar, Bagalmadu, Samnapur, and Yekkhalli.

== Demographics ==
As of 2001 India census, Hattikuni had a population of 5,056 with 2,636 males and 2,420 females.

== See also ==
- Yadgir
- Districts of Karnataka
