= Gonal =

Gonal may refer to:

- a gonadotrophic hormone secreted by the pituitary gland, see: Follicle-stimulating hormone
  - Gonal F, a brand of gonadotropin preparation
- -gonal, an adjectival ending for polygons

== Places ==
- Gonal, Badami, village in Mangalore Gram Panchayat, Badami Taluka, Bagalkot District, Karnataka, India
- Gonal, Koppal, village in Gangawati Taluka, Koppal District, Karnataka, India
- Gonal, Shorapur, panchayat village in Shorapur Taluka, Yadgir District, Karnataka, India
- Gonal, Wadgera, village in Wadgera Taluka, Yadgir District, Karnataka, India

== People ==
- Sergio Gonal, Argentine comedian at, for example, Videomatch#Characters and skits

== See also ==
- Gonal Number, see Polygonal number
- MacDonell
- McDonnell (surname)
