= Yelahar =

Yelheri Yelheri
- Village
- Location within Karnataka Location within India
- Coordinates: 16°43′40″N 077°19′49″E
- Country: India
- State: Karnataka
- District: Yadgir district
- Taluka: Yadgir

Government
  - Type: Panchayati raj (India)
  - Body: Gram panchayat

Population (2001)
  - Total: 4,214

Languages
  - Official: Kannada
- Time zone: UTC+5:30 (IST)
- ISO 3166 code: IN-KA
- Vehicle registration: KA
- Website: karnataka.gov.in

Yelheri is a panchayat village in the southern state of Karnataka, India. Administratively, Yelahar is under Yadgir Taluka of Yadgir District in Karnataka. The village of Yelheri is 6 km by road west of the village of Konkal, and 10 km by road south-southeast of the village of Paspool. The nearest railhead is in Yadgir.

There are four villages in the gram panchayat: Yelheri, Ghanpur, Nawaburz, and Totlur.

== Demographics ==
At the 2001 census, the village of Yelheri had 4,214 inhabitants, with 2,085 males and 2,129 females.
