= Gurmatkal =

Gurmitkal Gurumitkal
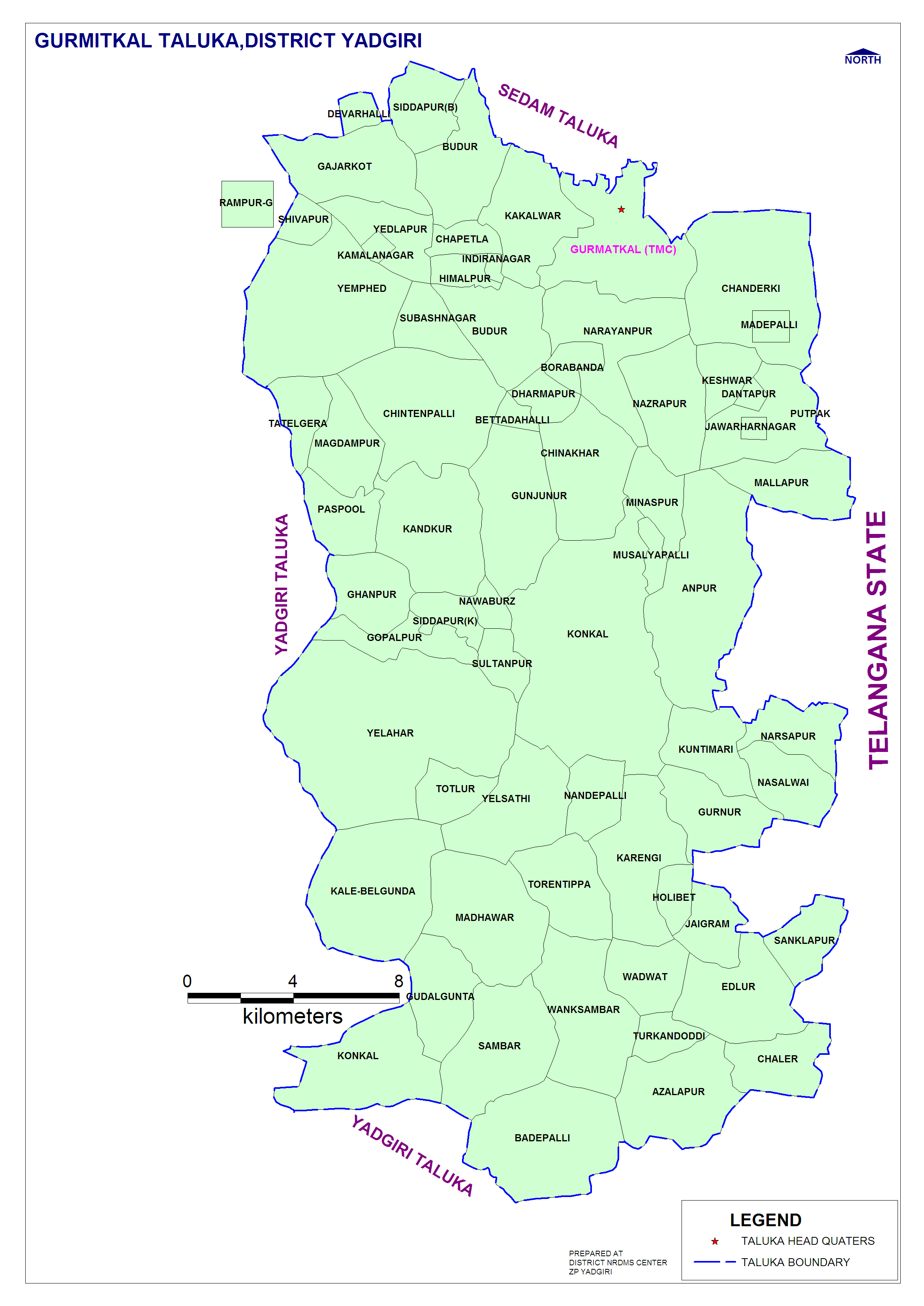
- Gurumathakal Taluk

- Location in Karnataka, India
- Coordinates: 16.87°N 77.4°E
- Country: SH 16 HYD ROAD GKLIndia
- GKLState: Karnataka
- Division: Gulbarga
- District: Yadgir
- Taluka: Gurumitkal
- Elevation: 608 m (1,995 ft)

Population (2011)
  - Total: 20,614

Languages
  - Official: Kannada
- Time zone: UTC+5:30 (IST)

Gurmitkal, or Gurumithakal, is a panchayat town in the northeast of Yadgir district in the Indian state of Karnataka. Administratively, it is under Gurumitkal Taluka.

== History ==
Gurumatkal was established as a Town Municipal Council (TMC) in the year 1957. and later was downgraded to a town panchayat in the year 1984. Gurumatkal town is situated forty-one kilometres from Yagir District Headquarters along the Bijapur-Hyderabad Highway. Gurumatkal is at a distance of about 650 km from the state capital city of Bengaluru and 110 km from the town of Gulbarga. The nearest airport is at kalaburagi which is 100 km from the town. The nearest railway station is Yadgir. The main source of transportation is by road. Gurumatkal is a tourist town, but the inhabitants mainly depend on agriculture. The water supply mainly depends on borewells.

== Demographics ==
The area of the town is 3.50 square kilometres (1.4 sq mi). As of the 2001 census there were four wards, but by the 2011 census there were 17 wards. As of 2001, the town panchayat had 46 km of roads of which 25 km were surfaced. As of 2011 India census, Gurmitkal has a population of 20,631, up from 16,927 in the 2001 census. Males constitute 50% of the population and females 50%. Gurmatkal has an average literacy rate of 50%, lower than the national average of 59.5%: male literacy is 60%, and female literacy is 40%. 15% of the population is under 6 years of age.

Gurmitkal has an ayurvedic hospital, Sri Vaidya Bhujangrao Memorial Hospital, which specializes in curing paralysis patients and has been run by the same family for two generations.

There are several spiritual places near Gurmitkal such as Yanagundi of 'Sri Sri Sri Mahayogini Manikeshwari Matha' and Mothakpalli which has a famous Hanuman temple. There is also a waterfall called as 'Dhab dabi', located 5 km away from the town on the way to Nazrapur Village. And there is also a spiritual place and waterfall called 'Gvisiddalingeshwar', located in the village of Chinthanahalli.
