= Shorapur Assembly constituency =

Legislative Assembly constituency in Karnataka State, India

Coordinates: 16.52°N 76.76°E

Shorapur
- Constituency No. 36 for the Karnataka Legislative Assembly

Constituency details
- Country: India
- Region: South India
- State: Karnataka
- Division: Kalaburagi
- District: Yadgir
- Lok Sabha constituency: Raichur
- Established: 1951
- Total electors: 281,869
- Reservation: ST

Member of Legislative Assembly
- 16th Karnataka Legislative Assembly
- Incumbent Raja Venugopal Naik
- Party: Indian National Congress
- Elected year: 2024
- Preceded by: Raja Venkatappa Nayak

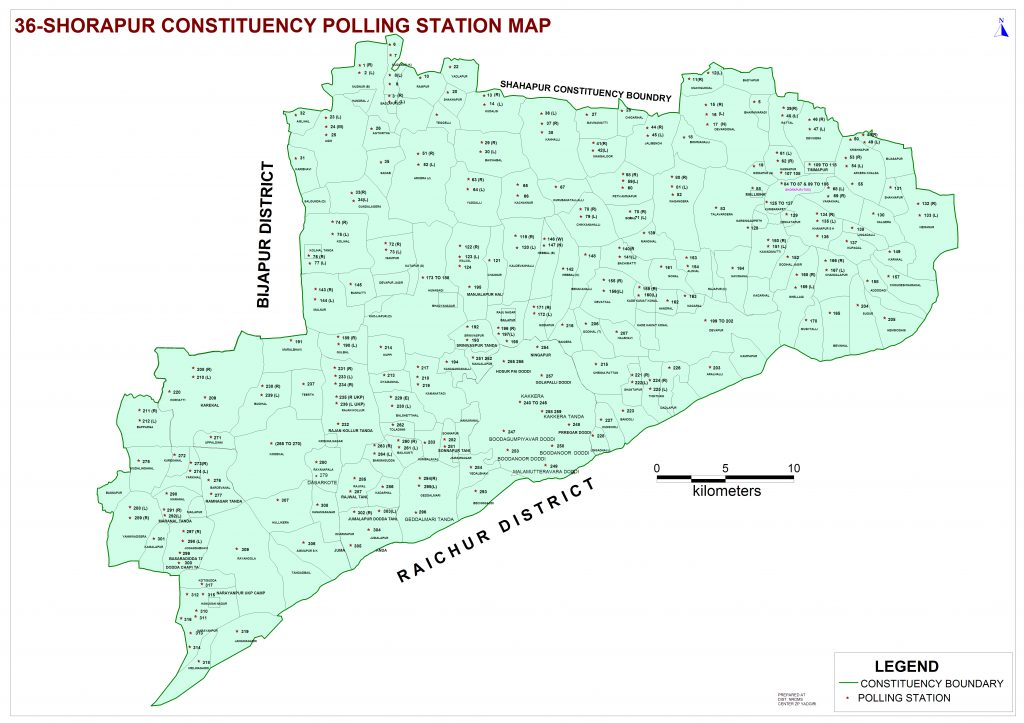
Shorapur Vidhana Sabha constituency map

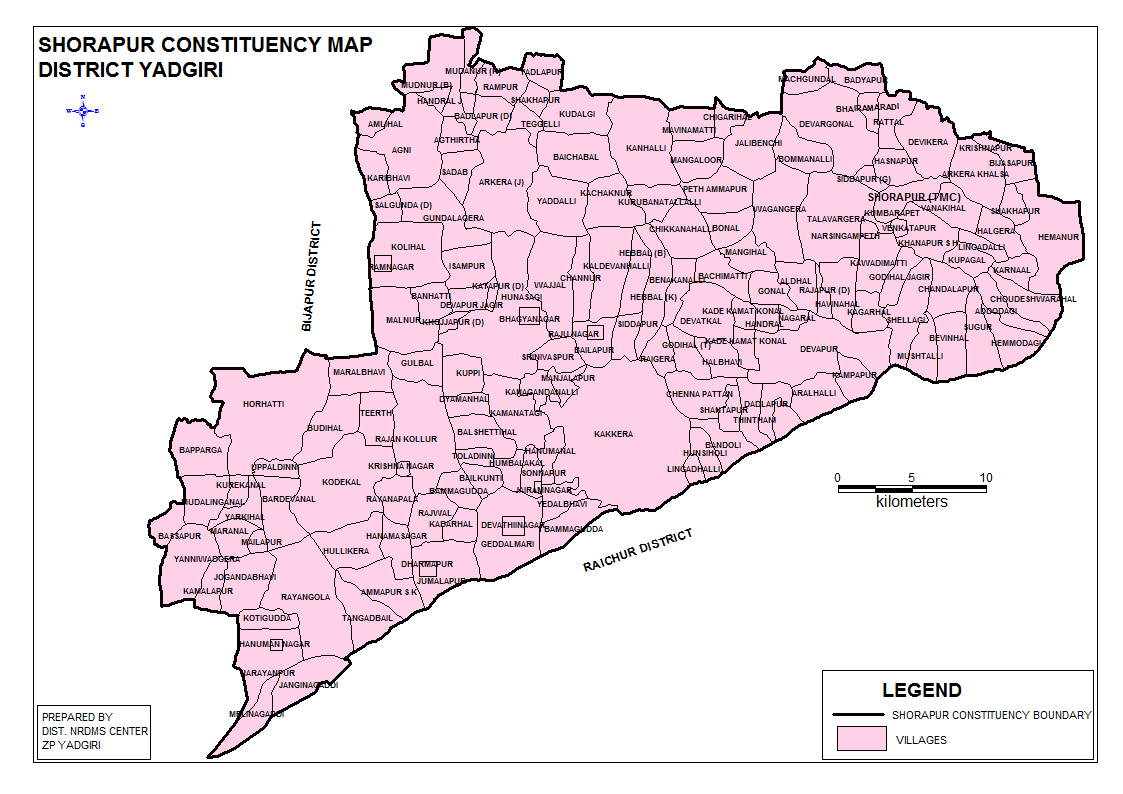
Shorapur Vidhana Sabha constituency map

Shorapur Assembly constituency is one of the 224 Legislative Assembly constituencies of Karnataka in India.

It is part of Yadgir district and is reserved for candidates belonging to the Scheduled Tribes. Raja Venkatappa Naik's son Raja Venugopal Naik was elected in the by-election, caused due to the demise of his father in February 2024.

== Members of the Legislative Assembly ==
Election	Member	Party
1952	Kollur Mallappa	Indian National Congress
1957	Kumar Naik Venkatappa Naik	Indian National Congress
1962	Raja Pidnaik Raja Krishtappa Naik	Swatantra Party
1967	Raja Pidnaik Raja Krishtappa Naik	Indian National Congress
1972	Raja Pidnaik Raja Krishtappa Naik	Independent politician
1978	Raja Kumar Naik	Indian National Congress
1983	Raja Madan Gopal Nayak	Indian National Congress
1985	Raja Madan Gopal Nayak	Indian National Congress
1989	Raja Madan Gopal Nayak	Indian National Congress
1994	Raja Venkatappa Naik	Karnataka Pradesh Congress Committee
1999	Raja Venkatappa Naik	Indian National Congress
2004	Narasimha Nayak (Raju Gowda)	Kannada Nadu Party
2008	Narasimha Nayak (Raju Gowda)	Bharatiya Janata Party
2013	Raja Venkatappa Naik	Indian National Congress
2018	Narasimha Nayak (Raju Gowda)	Bharatiya Janata Party
2023	Raja Venkatappa Naik	Indian National Congress
2024 By-election (Note: Died Raja Venkatappa Naik on 24 February 2024)	Raja Venugopal Naik	Indian National Congress

== Election results ==
=== Assembly by-election 2024 ===
2024 Karnataka Legislative Assembly by-election: Shorapur
Party	Candidate	Votes	%	±%
INC	Raja Venugopal Naik	114,886	53.57%	▼1.15
BJP	Narasimha Nayak (Raju Gowda)	96,566	45.03%	▲2.46
Independent	Ashoka Laxmana	1,612	0.75%	New
NOTA	None of the above	848	0.40%	▼0.21
Margin of victory		18,320	8.54%	▼3.61
Turnout		215,261	76.02%	▲0.35
Total valid votes		214,451		
Registered electors		283,148		▲2.78
INC hold		Swing	▼1.15	

=== Assembly election 2023 ===
2023 Karnataka Legislative Assembly election: Shorapur
Party	Candidate	Votes	%	±%
INC	Raja Venkatappa Naik	113,559	54.72%	▲13.21
BJP	Narasimha Nayak (Raju Gowda)	88,336	42.57%	▼10.39
JD(S)	Shravanakumar Nayak	1,544	0.74%	▼1.69
AAP	R. Manjunath Nayak	1,348	0.65%	New
NOTA	None of the above	1,259	0.61%	▼0.26
Margin of victory		25,223	12.15%	▲0.71
Turnout		208,464	75.67%	▲4.09
Total valid votes		207,530		
Registered electors		275,483		▼0.07
INC gain from BJP		Swing	▲1.76	

=== Assembly election 2018 ===
2018 Karnataka Legislative Assembly election: Shorapur
Party	Candidate	Votes	%	±%
BJP	Narasimha Nayak (Raju Gowda)	104,426	52.96%	▲50.40
INC	Raja Venkatappa Naik	81,858	41.51%	▼9.65
JD(S)	Raja Krishnappa Nayak	4,796	2.43%	▼45.52
NOTA	None of the above	1,720	0.87%	New
AIMEP	Raja Ramappa Nayak. J. G	1,513	0.77%	New
Margin of victory		22,568	11.44%	▲8.23
Turnout		197,311	71.58%	▲5.20
Total valid votes		197,196		
Registered electors		275,668		▲25.12
BJP gain from INC		Swing	▲1.80	

=== Assembly election 2013 ===
2013 Karnataka Legislative Assembly election: Shorapur
Party	Candidate	Votes	%	±%
INC	Raja Venkatappa Naik	65,033	51.16%	▲7.37
JD(S)	Narasimha Nayak (Raju Gowda)	60,958	47.95%	▲45.13
KJP	Shivaraj Malleshi	8,239	6.48%	New
Independent	Ramanagouda Bhimarayagouda	3,250	2.56%	New
BJP	Madangopal Nayak	3,249	2.56%	▼44.81
BSRCP	Nandkumar Malipatil	2,005	1.58%	New
Independent	Prabhulinga Siddapur. J	993	0.78%	New
Independent	Basavaraj	985	0.77%	New
Margin of victory		4,075	3.21%	▼0.37
Turnout		146,244	66.38%	▲7.25
Total valid votes		127,118		
Registered electors		220,323		▲1.92
INC gain from BJP		Swing	▲3.79	

=== Assembly election 2008 ===
2008 Karnataka Legislative Assembly election: Shorapur
Party	Candidate	Votes	%	±%
BJP	Narasimha Nayak (Raju Gowda)	60,542	47.37%	▲42.36
INC	Raja Venkatappa Naik	55,961	43.79%	▲7.71
JD(S)	Girijamma	3,601	2.82%	▼15.00
Independent	Somanna Biradar	1,929	1.51%	New
BSP	Laxman Rao Nayak	1,835	1.44%	New
Independent	Raja Ramappa Nayak. J. G	804	0.63%	New
Independent	Ramanagouda Bommanalli	774	0.61%	New
Margin of victory		4,581	3.58%	▲1.03
Turnout		127,831	59.13%	▼0.74
Total valid votes		127,800		
Registered electors		216,176		▲14.65
BJP gain from Kannada Nadu Party		Swing	▲8.74	

=== Assembly election 2004 ===
2004 Karnataka Legislative Assembly election: Shorapur
Party	Candidate	Votes	%	±%
Kannada Nadu Party	Narasimha Nayak (Raju Gowda)	43,608	38.63%	New
INC	Raja Venkatappa Naik	40,733	36.08%	▼10.27
JD(S)	Shivanna Mangihal	20,117	17.82%	▲15.83
BJP	Venugopal Naik Sugappa. J	5,657	5.01%	▲0.64
Independent	Ghanshamdas Tiwari	2,770	2.45%	New
Margin of victory		2,875	2.55%	▼18.35
Turnout		112,885	59.87%	▼2.11
Total valid votes		112,885		
Registered electors		188,559		▲14.08
Kannada Nadu Party gain from INC		Swing	▼7.72	

=== Assembly election 1999 ===
1999 Karnataka Legislative Assembly election: Shorapur
Party	Candidate	Votes	%	±%
INC	Raja Venkatappa Naik	45,351	46.35%	▲28.18
Independent	Shivanna Mangihal	24,901	25.45%	New
Independent	Raja Madan Gopal Nayak	20,195	20.64%	New
BJP	Venugopal Naik Sugappa. J	4,273	4.37%	▼5.79
JD(S)	Ninganna Chinchodi	1,946	1.99%	New
Independent	Ghanshamdas Tiwari	945	0.97%	New
Margin of victory		20,450	20.90%	▲14.56
Turnout		102,441	61.98%	▲0.37
Total valid votes		97,852		
Rejected ballots		4,589	4.48%	▲0.85
Registered electors		165,287		▲9.99
INC gain from INC		Swing	▲8.16	

=== Assembly election 1994 ===
1994 Karnataka Legislative Assembly election: Shorapur
Party	Candidate	Votes	%	±%
INC	Raja Venkatappa Naik	34,078	38.19%	New
JD	Diwan Shivanna Mangihal	28,419	31.85%	▲10.97
INC	Raja Madan Gopal Nayak	16,213	18.17%	▼22.24
BJP	Raja Venkatappa Naik (Tata) S/o Raja Pid Naik	9,066	10.16%	New
KRRS	Ayyanna Saibanna Halbhavi	938	1.05%	New
Margin of victory		5,659	6.34%	▼10.05
Turnout		92,588	61.61%	▲2.35
Total valid votes		89,224		
Rejected ballots		3,364	3.63%	▼2.80
Registered electors		150,271		▲10.25
INC gain from INC		Swing	▼2.22	

=== Assembly election 1989 ===
1989 Karnataka Legislative Assembly election: Shorapur
Party	Candidate	Votes	%	±%
INC	Raja Madan Gopal Nayak	30,545	40.41%	▲0.45
JP	Shivanna Mangihal	18,156	24.02%	New
JD	Neelakantraya	15,778	20.88%	New
Kranti Sabha	Basavantraygouda	11,101	14.69%	New
Margin of victory		12,389	16.39%	▲14.30
Turnout		80,774	59.26%	▲5.45
Total valid votes		75,580		
Rejected ballots		5,194	6.43%	▲3.40
Registered electors		136,295		▲26.83
INC hold		Swing	▲0.45	

=== Assembly election 1985 ===
1985 Karnataka Legislative Assembly election: Shorapur
Party	Candidate	Votes	%	±%
INC	Raja Madan Gopal Nayak	22,411	39.96%	▼14.00
JP	Shivanna Mangihal	21,238	37.87%	▲14.73
Independent	Raja Pidda Naik	9,261	16.51%	New
Independent	Mareppa	1,245	2.22%	New
BJP	Ashok Kumar Gadagade	906	1.62%	New
Independent	Hanumappa Talwar	521	0.93%	New
Margin of victory		1,173	2.09%	▼28.73
Turnout		57,830	53.81%	▲0.62
Total valid votes		56,077		
Rejected ballots		1,753	3.03%	▼2.03
Registered electors		107,463		▲12.36
INC hold		Swing	▼14.00	

=== Assembly election 1983 ===
1983 Karnataka Legislative Assembly election: Shorapur
Party	Candidate	Votes	%	±%
INC	Raja Madan Gopal Nayak	26,062	53.96%	▲42.78
JP	Raja Pidda Naik	11,177	23.14%	▼13.72
Independent	Raja Venkatappa Naik Raja Kumar Naik	11,062	22.90%	New
Margin of victory		14,885	30.82%	▲15.73
Turnout		50,873	53.19%	▼3.27
Total valid votes		48,301		
Rejected ballots		2,572	5.06%	▼0.17
Registered electors		95,645		▲14.60
INC gain from INC(I)		Swing	▲2.00	

=== Assembly election 1978 ===
1978 Karnataka Legislative Assembly election: Shorapur
Party	Candidate	Votes	%	±%
INC(I)	Raja Kumar Naik	23,201	51.96%	New
JP	Raja Pidda Naik	16,461	36.86%	New
INC	Shivappa Basappa	4,992	11.18%	▼17.15
Margin of victory		6,740	15.09%	▼10.76
Turnout		47,119	56.46%	▲10.55
Total valid votes		44,654		
Rejected ballots		2,465	5.23%	▲5.23
Registered electors		83,457		▲19.49
INC(I) gain from Independent		Swing	▼2.22	

=== Assembly election 1972 ===
1972 Mysore State Legislative Assembly election: Shorapur
Party	Candidate	Votes	%	±%
Independent	Raja Pidnaik Raja Krishtappa Naik	16,541	54.18%	New
INC	Abbas Ali	8,648	28.33%	▼53.37
SWA	Mahant Swami	5,341	17.49%	New
Margin of victory		7,893	25.85%	▼37.56
Turnout		32,068	45.91%	▲2.94
Total valid votes		30,530		
Registered electors		69,847		▲12.46
Independent gain from INC		Swing	▼27.52	

=== Assembly election 1967 ===
1967 Mysore State Legislative Assembly election: Shorapur
Party	Candidate	Votes	%	±%
INC	Raja Pidnaik Raja Krishtappa Naik	20,117	81.70%	▲52.34
Independent	A. Wahed	4,505	18.30%	New
Margin of victory		15,612	63.41%	▲22.13
Turnout		26,688	42.97%	▼9.47
Total valid votes		24,622		
Registered electors		62,110		▲10.67
INC gain from SWA		Swing	▲11.06	

=== Assembly election 1962 ===
1962 Mysore State Legislative Assembly election: Shorapur
Party	Candidate	Votes	%	±%
SWA	Raja Pidnaik Raja Krishtappa Naik	18,841	70.64%	New
INC	Dharmrao Sharnappa	7,830	29.36%	▼30.01
Margin of victory		11,011	41.28%	▲22.54
Turnout		29,430	52.44%	▲0.50
Total valid votes		26,671		
Registered electors		56,121		▲11.21
SWA gain from INC		Swing	▲11.27	

=== Assembly election 1957 ===
1957 Mysore State Legislative Assembly election: Shorapur
Party	Candidate	Votes	%	±%
INC	Kumar Naik Venkatappa Naik	15,561	59.37%	▲6.56
Independent	Mahant Swami	10,650	40.63%	New
Margin of victory		4,911	18.74%	▲6.35
Turnout		26,211	51.94%	▲14.99
Total valid votes		26,211		
Registered electors		50,463		▲4.45
INC hold		Swing	▲6.56	

=== Assembly election 1952 ===
1952 Hyderabad State Legislative Assembly election: Shorapur
Party	Candidate	Votes	%	±%
INC	Kollur Mallappa	9,428	52.81%	New
Independent	Mahant Swami	7,217	40.43%	New
Independent	Doddappa	1,207	6.76%	New
Margin of victory		2,211	12.39%	
Turnout		17,852	36.95%	
Total valid votes		17,852		
Registered electors		48,312		
INC win (new seat)				

== See also ==
- List of constituencies of the Karnataka Legislative Assembly
