= Talak =

Talak may refer to:

- Talak, Karnataka, a village in Yadgir district, Karnataka, India
- Talak, Nepal, a village in Nepal
- Talak, Niger, a region in Niger.

== See also ==
- Talaq, an Arabic word meaning "to release" or "to divorce", used to represent the formulaic process of divorcing in Islam.
- Talaka, 20th century Belarusian youth organization
