= Hedgimadra =

- Village
- Location within Karnataka Location within India
- Coordinates: 16°48′48″N 077°01′00″E
- Country: India
- State: Karnataka
- District: Yadgir district
- Taluka: Yadgir
- Gram panchayat: Thanagundi

Government
  - Type: Panchayati raj (India)
  - Body: Gram panchayat

Population (2001)
  - Total: 1,746

Languages
  - Official: Kannada
- Time zone: UTC+5:30 (IST)
- ISO 3166 code: IN-KA
- Vehicle registration: KA
- Website: karnataka.gov.in

Hedgimadra is a village in Thanagundi panchayat, Yadgir Taluka, Yadgir district, in Karnataka state, India. Hedgimadra is sixteen kilometres by road west-northwest of the town of Yadgir. The nearest rail station is Thangunda Railway Station, while the nearest railhead is in Yadgir.

== Demographics ==
At the 2001 census, Hedgimadra had 1,746 inhabitants, with 895 males and 851 females.
