= Mailapur =

Mailapur or Mailapura may refer to:

- Mylapore, a borough of Madras, India
  - Dioceses of Saint Thomas of Mylapore, Roman Catholic dioceses of Mylapore, Madras, India
- Mailapura, Yadgir, a village in Yadagir taluka, Yadgir district, Karnataka, India
