= Talak, Karnataka =

Talak
- Village
- Location within Karnataka Location within India
- Coordinates: 16°49′27″N 077°00′09″E
- Country: India
- State: Karnataka
- District: Yadgir district
- Taluka: Yadgir

Government
  - Type: Panchayat raj
  - Body: Gram panchayat

Languages
  - Official: Kannada
- Time zone: UTC+5:30 (IST)
- ISO 3166 code: IN-KA
- Vehicle registration: KA
- Website: karnataka.gov.in

Talak is a village in the Yadgir taluka of Yadgir district in Karnataka state, India. Talak is two and half kilometres by road northwest of the village of Hedgimadra, and 17 km by road from the town of Yadgir. The nearest railhead is in Yadgir.

== Demographics ==
At the 2001 census, Talak had 800 inhabitants, with 411 males and 389 females.
