= Peth Ammapur =

Peth Ammapur Peth Ammapura
- Village
- Location within Karnataka Location within India
- Coordinates: 16°31′58″N 076°40′08″E
- Country: India
- State: Karnataka
- District: Yadgir district
- Taluka: Shorapur

Government
  - Type: Panchayati raj (India)
  - Body: Gram panchayat

Population (2001)
  - Total: 3,680

Languages
  - Official: Kannada
- Time zone: UTC+5:30 (IST)
- ISO 3166 code: IN-KA
- Vehicle registration: KA
- Website: karnataka.gov.in

Peth Ammapur is a panchayat village in the southern state of Karnataka, India. Administratively, Peth Ammapur is under Shorapur Taluka of Yadgir District in Karnataka. The village of Peth Ammapur is 12 km by road west of the town of Shorapur and 13 km by road east of the village of Baichbal. The nearest railhead is in Yadgir.

There are three villages in the gram panchayat: Peth Ammapur, Jalibenchi and Mangloor.

== Demographics ==
At the 2001 census, the village of Peth Ammapur had 3,680 inhabitants, with 1,842 males and 1,838 females.
