= Kakkeri =

- Village
- Location in Karnataka, India Kakkeri (India)
- Coordinates: 15°29′05″N 74°43′00″E
- Country: India
- State: Karnataka
- District: Belgaum
- Talukas: Khanapur

Government
  - Body: Municipality

Languages
  - Official: Kannada
- Time zone: UTC+5:30 (IST)

Kakkeri is a village in Belgaum district in Karnataka, India.
