= Raja Venugopal Naik =

Indian politician

Raja Venugopal Naik (born 1982) is an Indian politician from Karnataka. He is a member of the Karnataka Legislative Assembly from the Shorapur Assembly constituency representing the Indian National Congress.

== Early life ==
Naik is from Surpur, which is also called Shorapur, in Yadgir district. His late father Raja Venkatappa Naik was a four time MLA from Shorapur. After his death in February 2024, Venugopal Naik won the by election in June 2024.

== Career ==
Naik became an MLA for the first time in June 2024. He won the 2024 Karnataka by election representing Indian National Congress from Shorapur Assembly constituency defeating his nearest rival and former minister, Narasimha Naik of Bharatiya Janata Party. He polled 114,886 votes and won by a margin of 18,320 votes.
