= Chara Basaveshwara Temple =

Temple in Karnataka

Chara Basaveshwara Temple is a temple in Shahapur, Karnataka. The temple is located near a prominent hill known as the Sleeping Buddha. The temple is the site of an annual bovine festival that lasts for 10 days.
