= Kembhavi =

- town
- Location in Karnataka, India Kembhavi (India)
- Coordinates: 16°39′N 76°32′E
- Country: India
- State: Karnataka
- District: Yadgir
- Talukas: surapur

Government
  - Type: town
  - Body: town municipale carporetion (TMC) kembhavi

Population (2018)
  - Total: 30,000

Languages
  - Official: Kannada
- Time zone: UTC+5:30 (IST)
- ISO 3166 code: IN-KA
- Vehicle registration: KA 33
- Website: karnataka.gov.in

Kembhavi is a town in the northern state of Karnataka, India. It is located in the Shorapur taluk of Yadgir district in Karnataka. There is an old well having octagonal shape. There is one tomb with single stone.

== Demographics ==
As of 2001 India census, Kembhavi had a population of 13077 with 6679 males and 6398 females.

== See also ==
- Yadgir
- Districts of Karnataka
