= Kodekal =

Kodekal chatrashilapur Kodigal, Kodekall
- village
- Nickname: kdl
- Location in Karnataka, India Kodekal (India)
- Coordinates: 16°21′08″N 076°24′09″E
- Country: India
- State: Karnataka
- District: Yadgir
- Talukas: Hunasgi

Government
  - Type: Panchayati raj (India)
  - Body: Gram panchayat

Population (2001/2011)
  - Total: 6,056/11,067

Languages
  - Official: Kannada
- Time zone: UTC+5:30 (IST)
- Postal code: 585237
- ISO 3166 code: IN-KA
- Vehicle registration: KA
- Website: karnataka.gov.in

Kodekal (Kodigal) is a panchayat village in the southern state of Karnataka, India. It is located in the Hunasgi Taluka of Yadgir district in Karnataka. Kodekal is 8.5 km by road north-northeast of Jogandabhavi, and 4 km by road northwest of Bardevanhal, across the Dhon River.

== Demographics ==
Population (2001). • Total, 6,056. Languages. • Official, Kannada · Time zone · IST (UTC+5:30). Kodekal (Kodigal) is a panchayat village in the southern state of Karnataka, India. It is located. Demographics[edit]. As of 2001 India census, Kodekal had a population of 6,056 with 3,063 males and 2,993 females.

== See also ==
- Yadgir
