= Narasimha Nayak (Raju Gowda) =

Indian politician

Member of Karnataka Legislative Assembly Narasimha Nayak (Raju Gowda)
- ನರಸಿಂಹ ನಾಯಕ್ (ರಾಜು ಗೌಡ)

Karnataka Urban Water Supply & Drainage Board President
- Incumbent
- Assumed office 2020

Minister of Small scale Industries
- In office 2011–2013
- Preceded by: Shivaraj Tangadagi
- Succeeded by: Ramesh Jarkiholi

Member of Karnataka Legislative Assembly
- In office 2018–2023
- Succeeded by: Raja Venkatappa Nayak
- Constituency: Shorapur
- Preceded by: Raja Venkatappa Nayak
- In office 2004–2013
- Preceded by: Rajah Madangopal Nayak
- Constituency: Shorapur

Personal details
- Born: Narasimhanayaka Raju Gowda; 27 December 1978 (age 47) Kodekal
- Party: Bharatiya Janata Party
- Spouse: Maitra Nayak
- Children: 1 (Manikantha Nayak)
- Parent(s): Shambangouda, Timmamma
- Website: narasimhanayak.website

Narasimhanayak (born 27 December 1978), fondly called as Raju Gowda, is an Indian politician who is former Chairman Of Karnataka Urban Water Supply & Drainage Board since 2020. He is 3rd time Current Member of Karnataka Legislative Assembly from Shorapur Constituency since 2018. He is a member of the Bharatiya Janata Party and a cabinet minister (Karantaka State Small Industry Development) of Government Of Karnataka from 2011 to 2013. He was the state president of the BJP ST Morcha from 2016 to 2020.

== Early life ==
Narasihmanayak was born and brought up in Kodekal in Shorapur Taluk. His father, a retired Dy. Superintendent of Excise, served in the Excise Department of Karnataka.

== Political career ==
Narasihmanayak (Rajugowda) entered politics very early. His political Career started when he was elected member of Zilla Panchayat from Kodekal constituency at the age of 21. Soon he gained popularity in the Taluk quickly enough to become Member of Legislative Assembly from Shorapur Constituency at the age of 25 in 2004. He was youngest MLA at that time. He contested on a Kannada Nadu Party ticket and was lone contestant to get elected from Kannada Nadu Party. He was made a cabinet minister and was given Small Scale Industries ministry when he was elected for 2nd time from Shorapur Constituency on a BJP Ticket. He lost to Raja Venkatappa Nayak in 2013 elections. In MLA elections held in 2018, Rajugowda won against Raja Venkatappa Nayak for the 3rd time. He is currently the Chairman of Karnataka Urban water supply and drainage board.
