= Gonal, Koppal =

Gonal
- Village
- Location within Karnataka Location within India
- Coordinates: 15°28′28″N 076°31′18″E
- Country: India
- State: Karnataka
- District: Koppal district
- Taluka: Gangavathi

Government
  - Type: Panchayati raj (India)
  - Body: Gram panchayat

Languages
  - Official: Kannada
- Time zone: UTC+5:30 (IST)
- ISO 3166 code: IN-KA
- Vehicle registration: KA
- Website: karnataka.gov.in

Gonal is a village in the southern state of Karnataka, India. Administratively, Gonal is under Herur gram panchayat, Gangavathi Taluka of Koppal District in Karnataka. The village of Gonal is 3 km by road southeast of the village of Herur and 5.6 km by road north of the town of Gangawati.
