= Yadgir Fort =

Site information
- Open to the public: Yes

Location
- Shown within Karnataka Yadgir Fort (India)
- Coordinates: 16°45′31″N 77°08′16″E

Yadgir Fort, also known as Yetagiri, is a fortress situated in Yadgir, in the Yadgir District, of the Indian state of Karnataka. The fortress is notable for having been constructed on the top of a 100-meter (328 feet) tall monolith.

== History ==
The fortress is believed to have been built by the Western Chalukya Empire, and later, fall into the possession of the Yadava Dynasty. Within the fort, five edicts have been inscribed. Three inscriptions are from the 10th or 11th century, and one claims that a man named Jagganath hailing from a city or town named Sagar built the fort. The other two edicts, dated from the year 1546 located in the entrance of the Moti Talib, and one from 1573 located on the walls of a mosque, belonged to Ibrahim Adil Shah I. The fort would fall into the hands of kingdoms such as the Bahmani Sultanate, Adil Shahi Dynasty and the Nizams. Gulam Yazdani surveyed the fort in the years 1929 through 1930.

== Terrain ==
The fortress was built on rocky terrain, and overlooks the town of Yadgir. The fort is situated atop a large 100 meter monolith, that is 500 meters wide, and 850 meters long.

== Structure ==
Yadgir Fort has multiple structures within it. Cannons with a maximum diameter of 10 inches, barracks, three ancient Hindu temples and a medieval mosque, flag bastions, wells and canals, and underground structures used possibly as storehouses or hideouts are located within the fort.
