= Hunasagi =

- Town
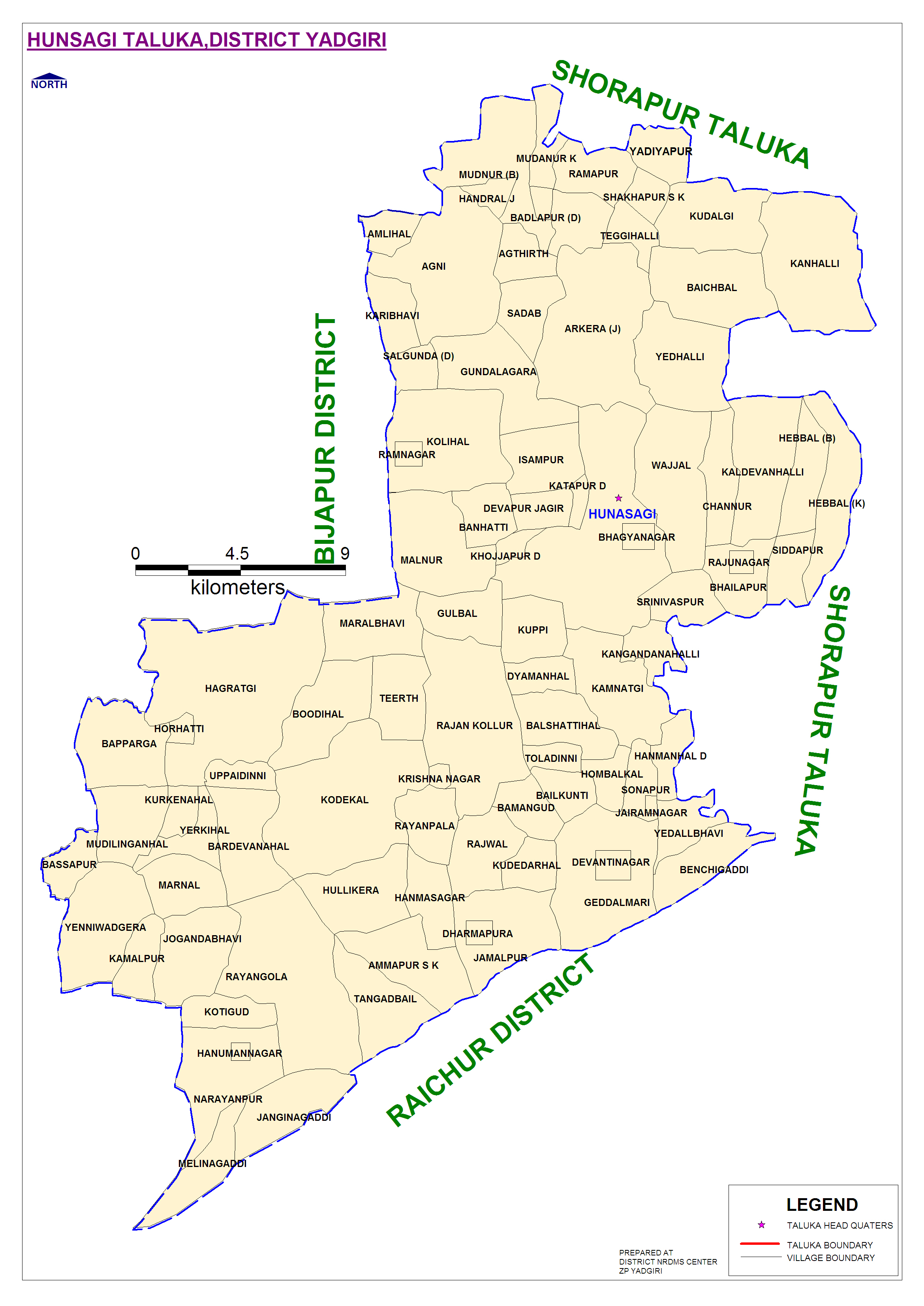
- Hunasagi Taluk Map

- Location within Karnataka Location within India
- Coordinates: 16°27′27″N 76°31′26″E
- Country: India
- State: Karnataka
- District: Yadgir

Population (2011)
  - Total: 15,000+

Languages
  - Official: Kannada
- Time zone: UTC+5:30 (IST)
- PIN: 585215
- Telephone code: 08444
- ISO 3166 code: IN-KA
- Vehicle registration: KA33

Hunasagi (Hunsagi) is a taluk of Yadgir district in the state of Karnataka in India. A number of early Palaeolithic sites have been found in Hunasagi. Hunasagi is 48 km southwest of the district headquarters, Yadgiri and 33 km from Shorapur. The nearest railhead is in Yadgiri. Old name was vikramapura

Some old Stone Age stone cutting equipments have been found and kept in the Hunasagi Grampanchayat office. It looks like a "Mini Museum".

== Archaeological sites ==
One late stage Old Stone Age site, excavated at Hunasagi, contained stone tools and weapons made from a reddish-brown chert. Tools found included longish blades with sharp edges and many multi purpose instruments.

At some sites, large numbers of the tools, used for all sorts of activities, were found, suggesting that these were probably habitation-cum factory sites. In some of the other, smaller sites, there is evidence to suggest that there were locations where just tools were made. Some of the sites were close to springs. Most of the tools were made from the local limestone. About 15000 stone tools have been found there in abundance, considered oldest in India than the Pallavaram in Tamil Nadu.

== See also ==
- Kibbanahalli (pre-historic site)
- Lingadahalli (pre-historic site)
- Hunasagi(taluka headquarters)
- Yadgir (district headquarters)
