= Bonal Bird Sanctuary =

Bonal Bird Sanctuary ಬೋನಾಳ ಪಕ್ಷಿ ಧಾಮ Bonal Bird Sanctuary
- Village
- Location within Karnataka
- Coordinates: 16°31′36.88″N 76°39′24.11″E
- Country: India
- State: Karnataka
- District: (Yadagiri)Yadgir district
- Established: 2011

Government
  - Body: grama panchayati

Languages
  - Official: Kannada
- Time zone: UTC+5:30 (IST)
- PIN: 585290
- ISO 3166 code: IN-KA
- Vehicle registration: KA
- Website: karnataka.gov.in

Bonal Bird Sanctuary, sometimes spelled Bohnal Bird Sanctuary (Kannada: ಬೋನಾಳ ಪಕ್ಷಿ ಧಾಮ), is a bird sanctuary and wetland near Bonal village in the Shorapur taluk of Yadgir district in Karnataka state, India. It is the second largest bird sanctuary in the state, after Rangantittu Bird Sanctuary in Mandya, and around 21 species of birds have been recorded here, including the purple heron, white-necked stork, white ibis, black ibis, brahminy duck, and bar-headed goose.

== History ==
The sanctuary has its origins in thetank of bonal, a water conservation tank built by the 17th century ruler of Shorapur, Pam Naik, later during the British Raj, Meadows Taylor, the British administrator at Shorapur, extended it to 1,600 acres with 12 feet average depth, as he mentions in his autobiography, The Story of My Life. It was one of largest amongst the twelve such water tanks built in the drought prone region, and gradually started attracting migratory birds. Most of these tanks were using were also used for fishing, and numerous families were dependent on it. In 1998, heeding to calls by conservationists, the state government transferred the area to the Forest Department from the Fisheries Department. Subsequently, fishing was banned the tank, but it took many more years before it was formally declared a bird sanctuary. Finally in 2010, government declared its plans to invest Rs. 1 crore towards converting Bonal Tank to a bird sanctuary.

== Location ==
Bohnal Bird Sanctuary is 10 km west to the city of Shorapur.

== See also ==
- Shorapur
- Yadagiri
