= Surapura =

Shorapur
- City
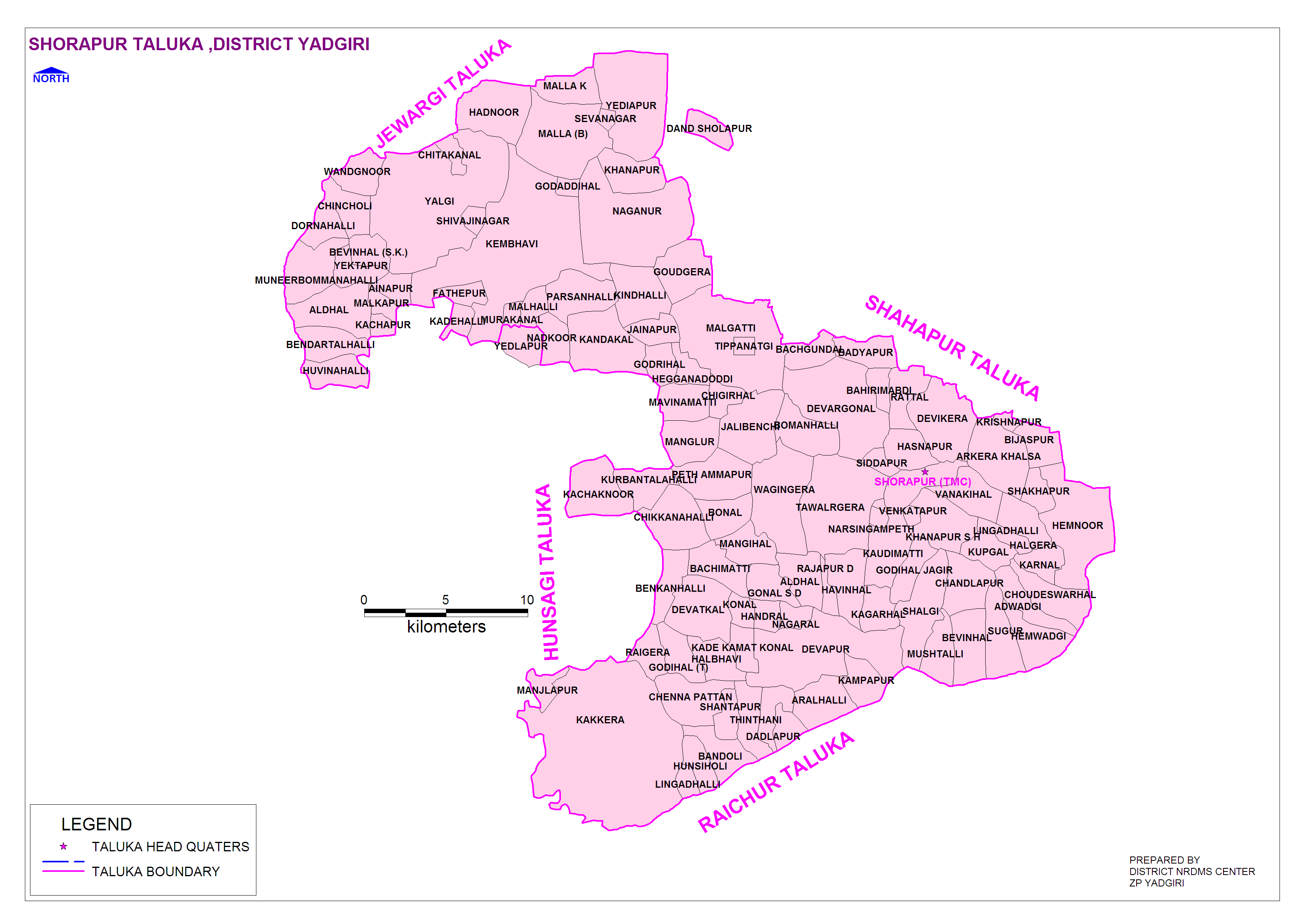
- Surapura Taluk Map
- Nicknames: Surpur Paddy, Pulses and Cotton City
- Location in Karnataka, India
- Coordinates: 16.52°N 76.76°E
- Country: India
- State: Karnataka
- District: Yadagiri
- Lok Sabha Constituency: Raichur
- Elevation: 428 m (1,404 ft)

Population (2011)
  - Total: 412,291

Languages
  - Official: Kannada
- Time zone: UTC+5:30 (IST)
- PIN: 585224
- Telephone code: 08443
- Vehicle registration: KA 33

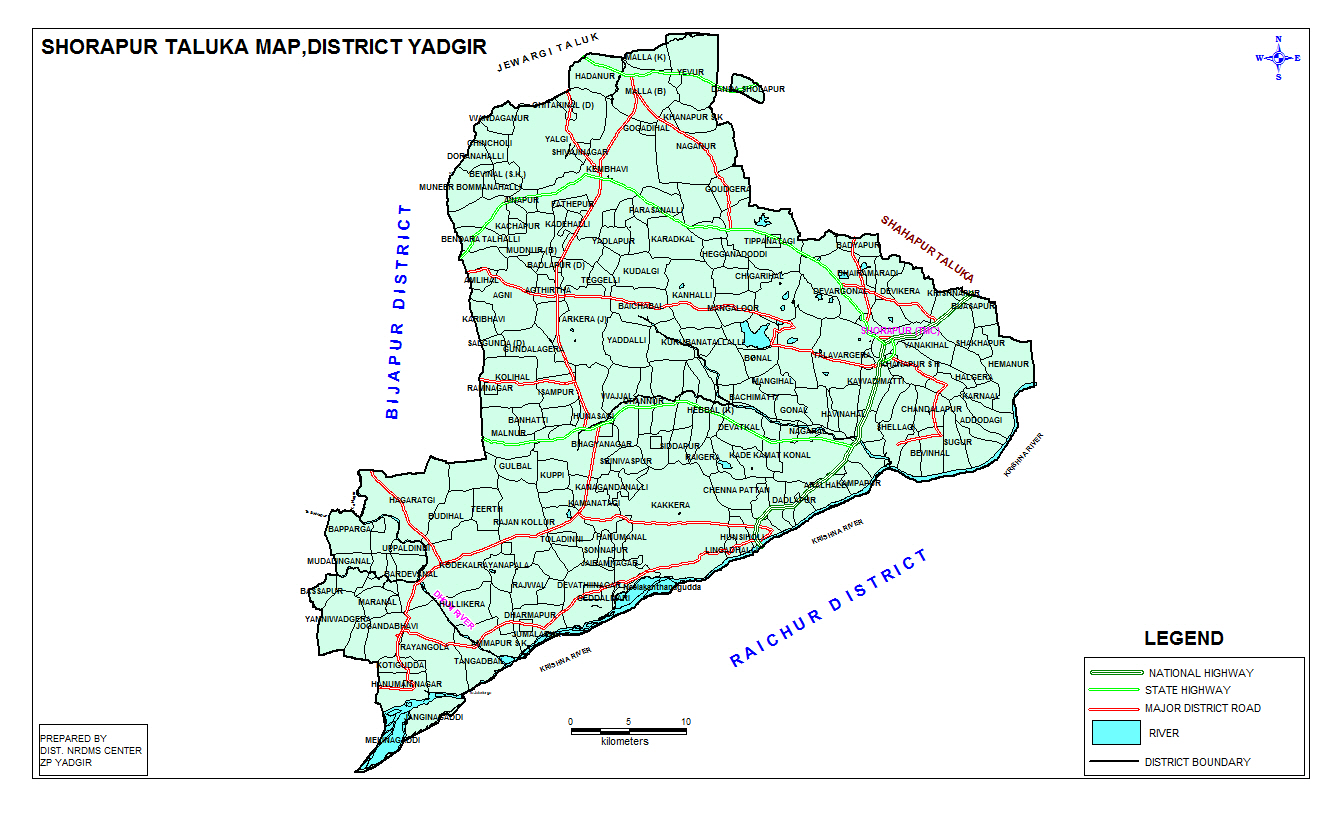
Shorapur Taluk Map before creation of Hunasagi Taluk

Shorapur, is a city and taluka in Yadgir district in the Indian state of Karnataka and a historical place. Surapura was the land of the famous prince of Surapura aasthana, Raja Venkatappa Nayaka, the young rebel freedom fighter against British rule.

== Demographics ==
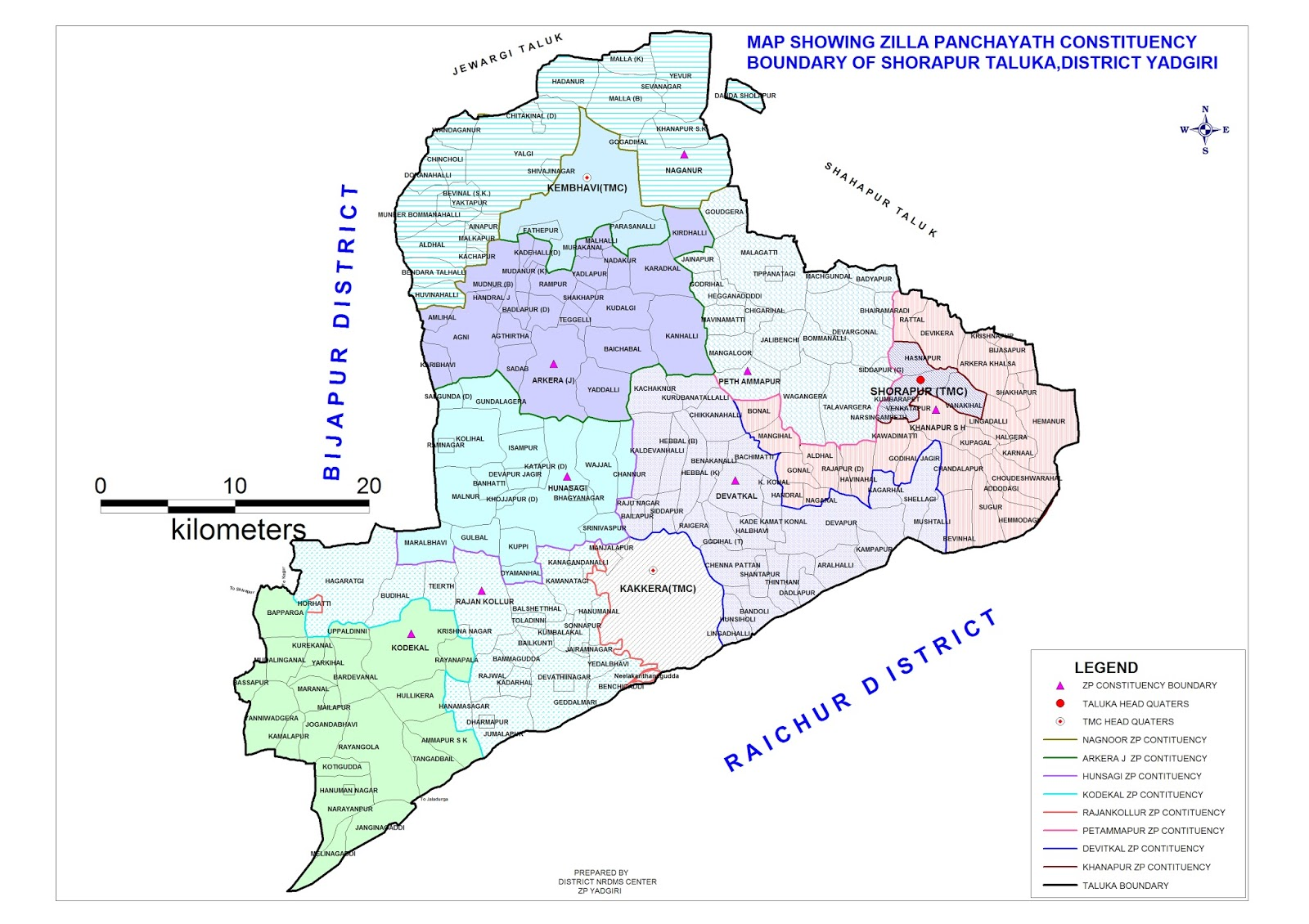
Shorapur Taluk Zilla Panchayat Map before creation of Hunasagi Taluk

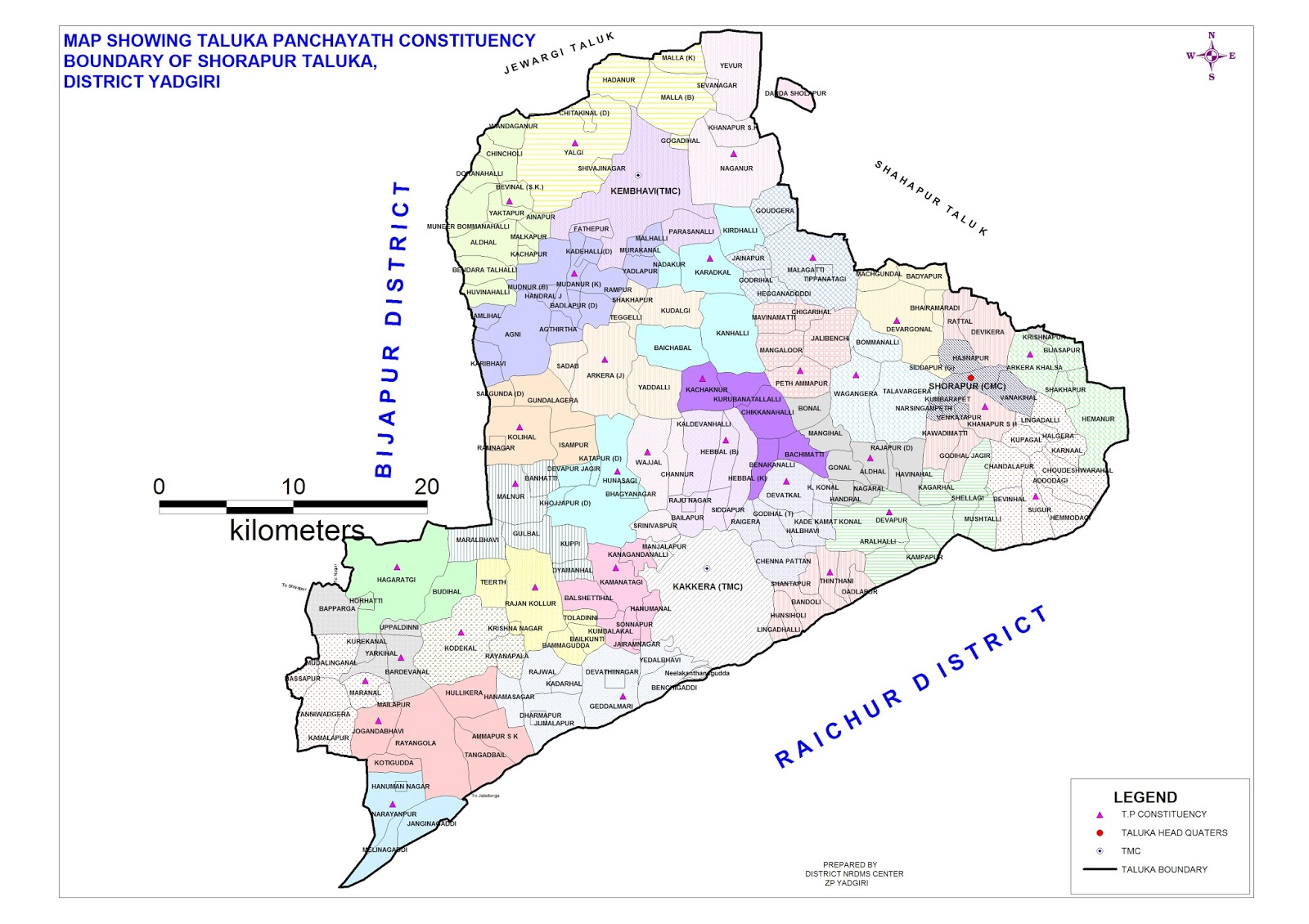
Shorapur Taluk Panchayat Map before creation of Hunasagi Taluk

As of 2001 India census, Surapura had a population of 43,591. Males constituted 51% of the population and females 49%. Surapura has an average literacy rate of 55%, lower than the national average of 59.5%: male literacy is 65% and female literacy is 46%. In Surapura, 16% of the population is under 6 years of age.

Surapura is known for the Shree Venugopala Swami Temple. Even today, all the disciplines offered in the Tirumala Temple at Tirupati were started from the contributions of the then Surapura (Shorapur) kings. They never visit the Tirumala temple, but a representative would be sent on their behalf. From 1703 the bedara (tribal) kingdom rose and ruled it up to 1858, with the last king being Raja Nalvadi Venkatappa Naayaka. Bonal Bird Sanctuary is located about 10 km from Surapura.

The major occupation of the people in and around Surapura is farming. Surapura is a large producer of cotton, pulses and paddy. Major attractions are the fort (Durbaar), Taylor Manzil, Gopalswami Temple, Jain Temple and Devar Baavi.

== Literature ==
The town has been vividly described in the Jamiya Masjid of Timmapur.

== See also ==
- Nayakas of Shorapur
