= Yadgir =

Town in Karnataka, India

Yadagiri
- City
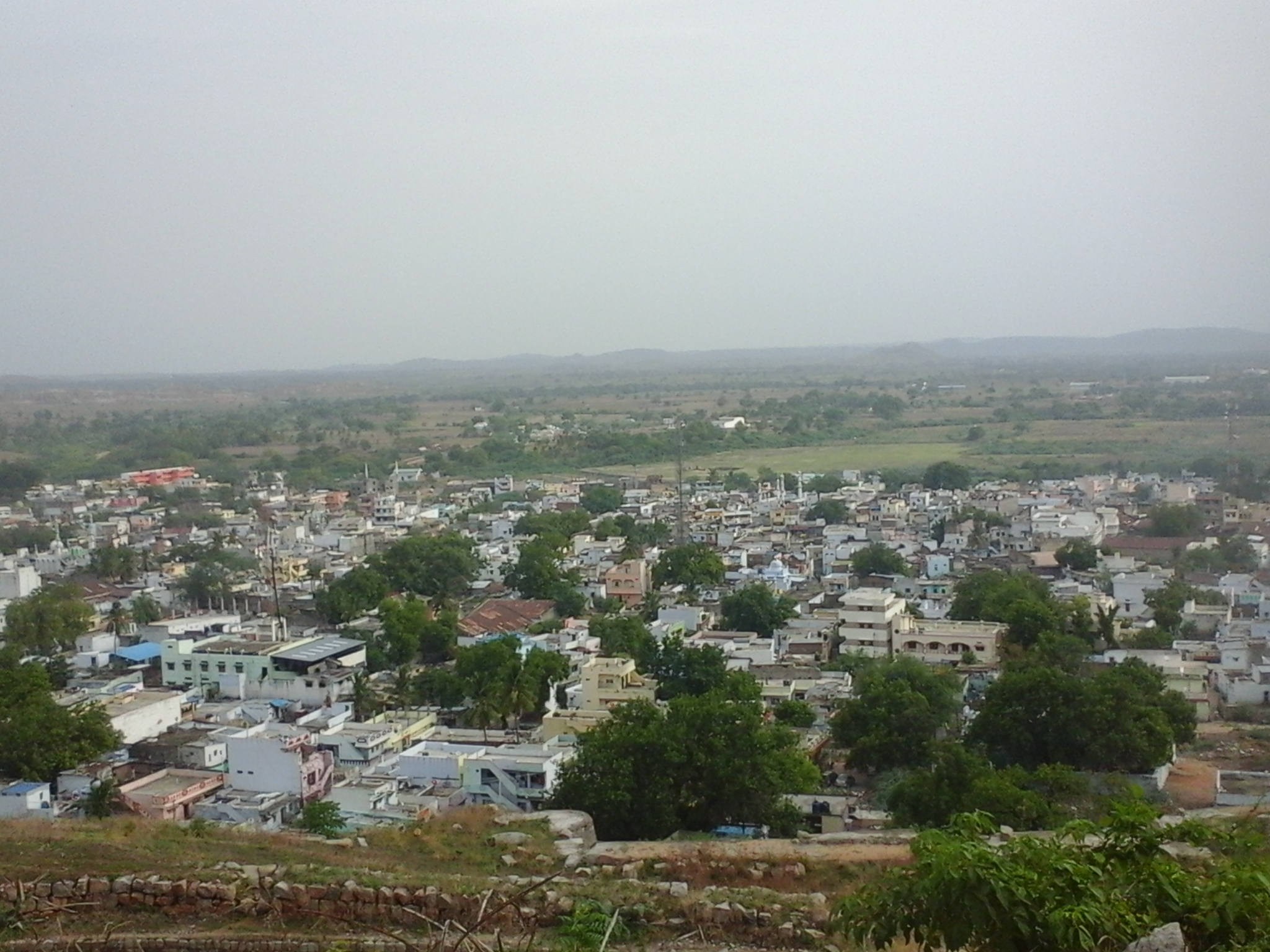
- A view of Yadgiri city

- Location in Karnataka, India
- Coordinates: 16°45′45.058″N 77°8′39.07″E
- Country: India
- State: Karnataka
- District: Yadgir
- Lok Sabha Constituency: Raichur

Area
  - Total: 5.6 km^{2} (2.2 sq mi)
- Elevation: 389 m (1,276 ft)

Population (2011)
  - Total: 74,294
  - Density: 10,500.36/km^{2} (27,195.8/sq mi)
- Demonym: Yadgirians

Languages
  - Official: Kannada
- Time zone: UTC+5:30 (IST)
- PIN: 585201 / 585202
- Telephone code: 08473
- Vehicle registration: KA-33
- Website: www.yadgircity.mrc.gov.in

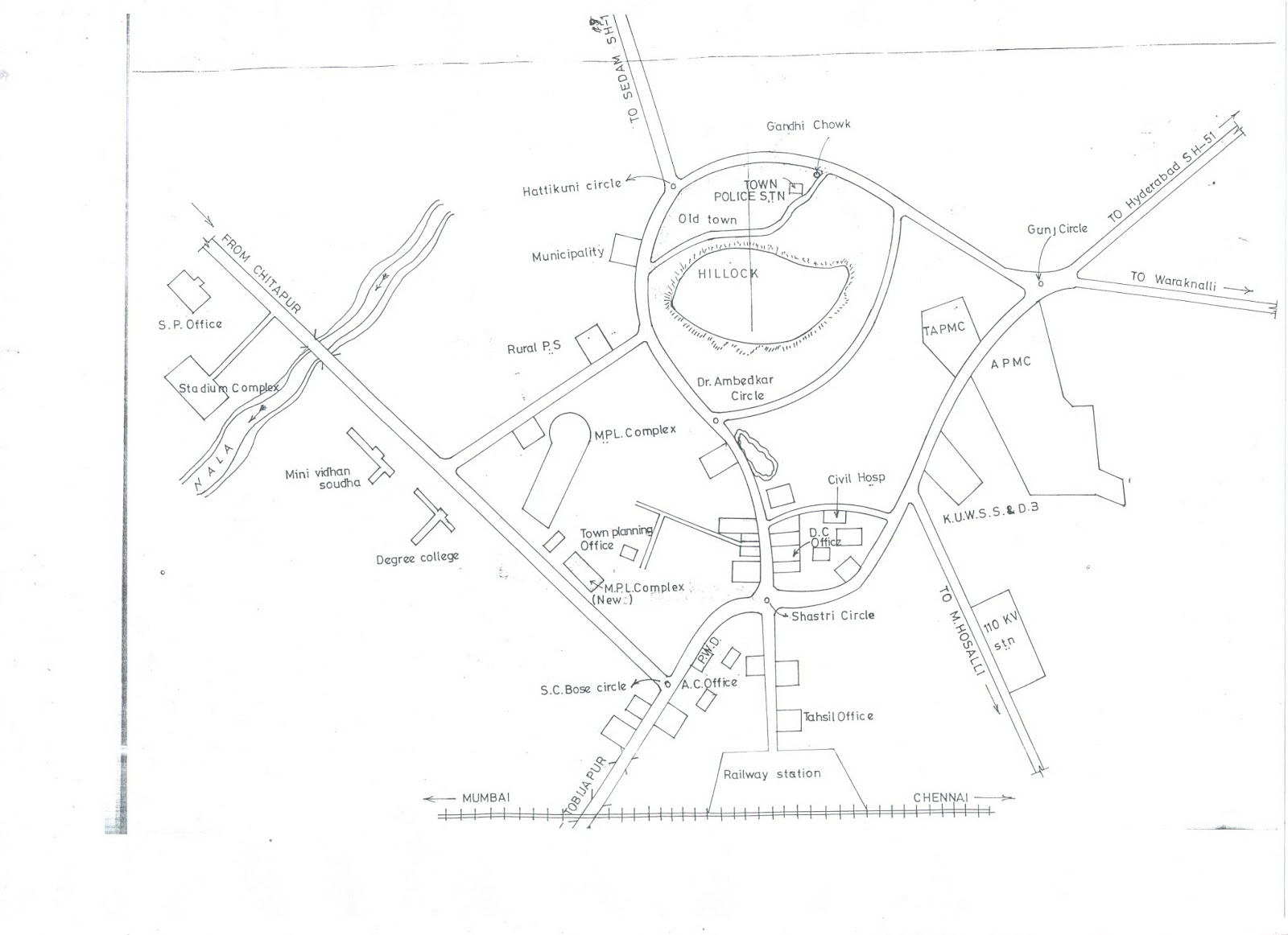
Yadgir Town Map

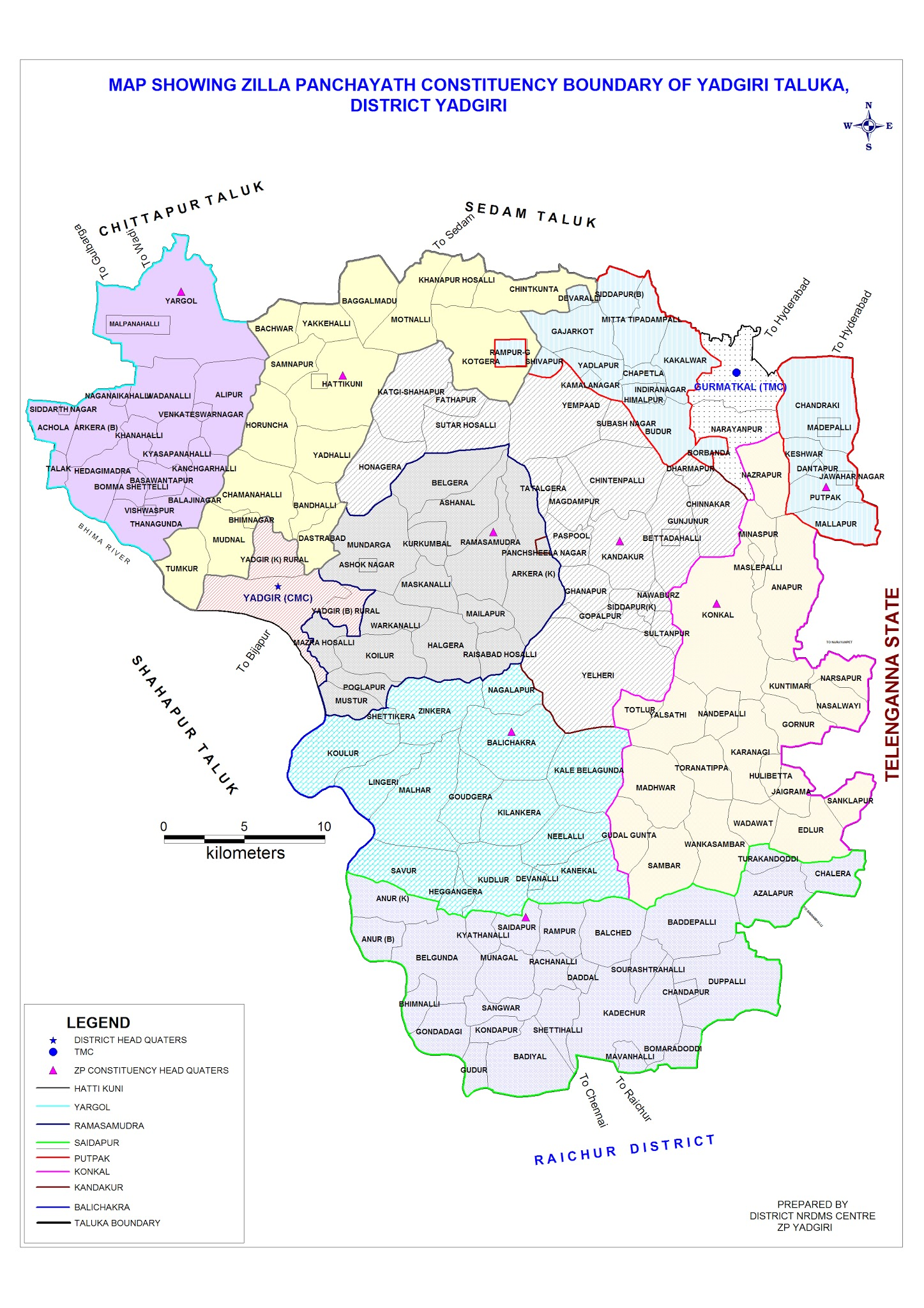
Yadgir Taluk Zilla Panchayat Map before creation Gurmitkal Taluk

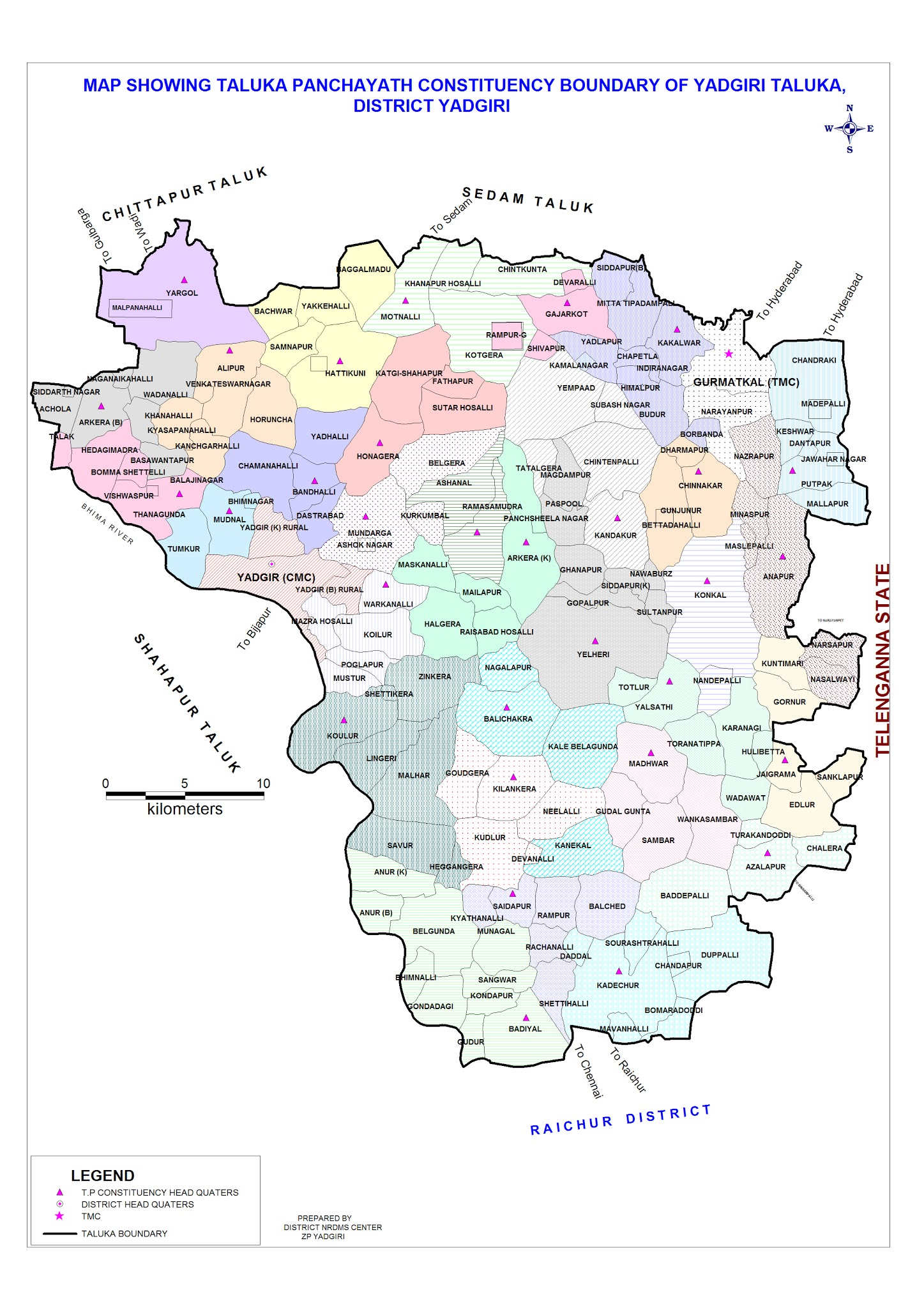
Yadgir Taluk Panchayat Map before creation Gurmitkal Taluk

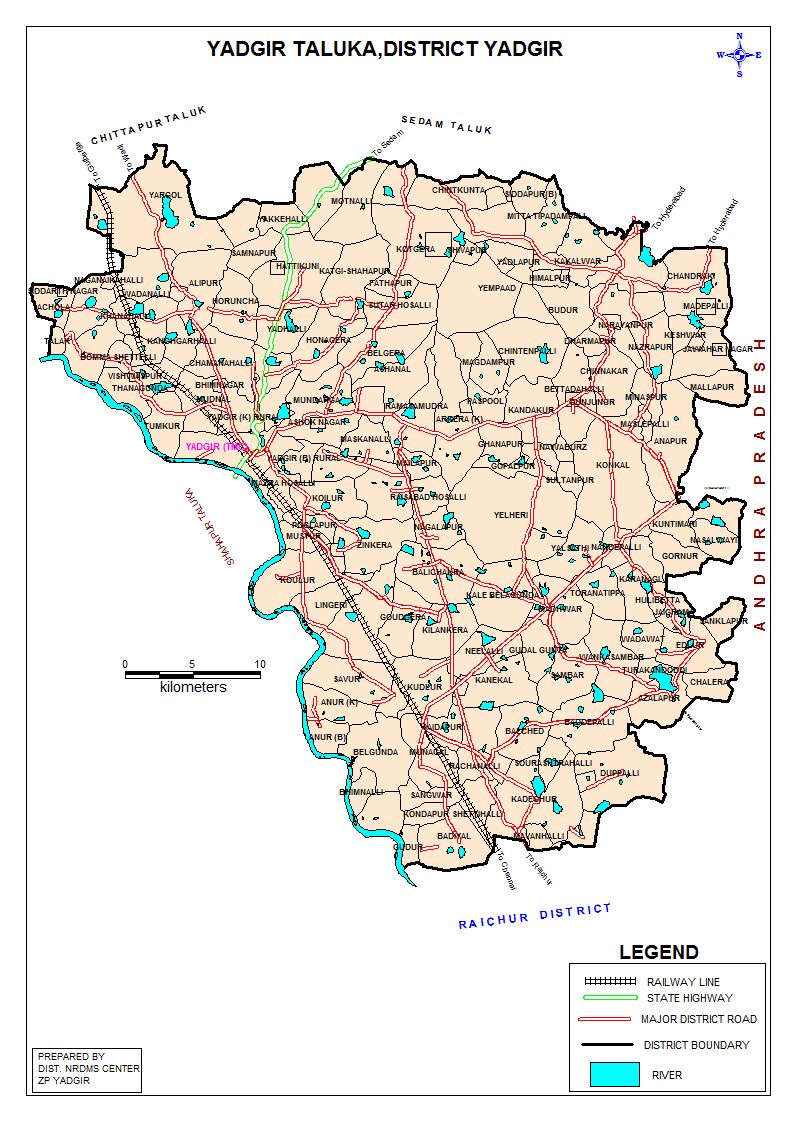
Yadgir Taluk Map before creation Gurmitkal Taluk

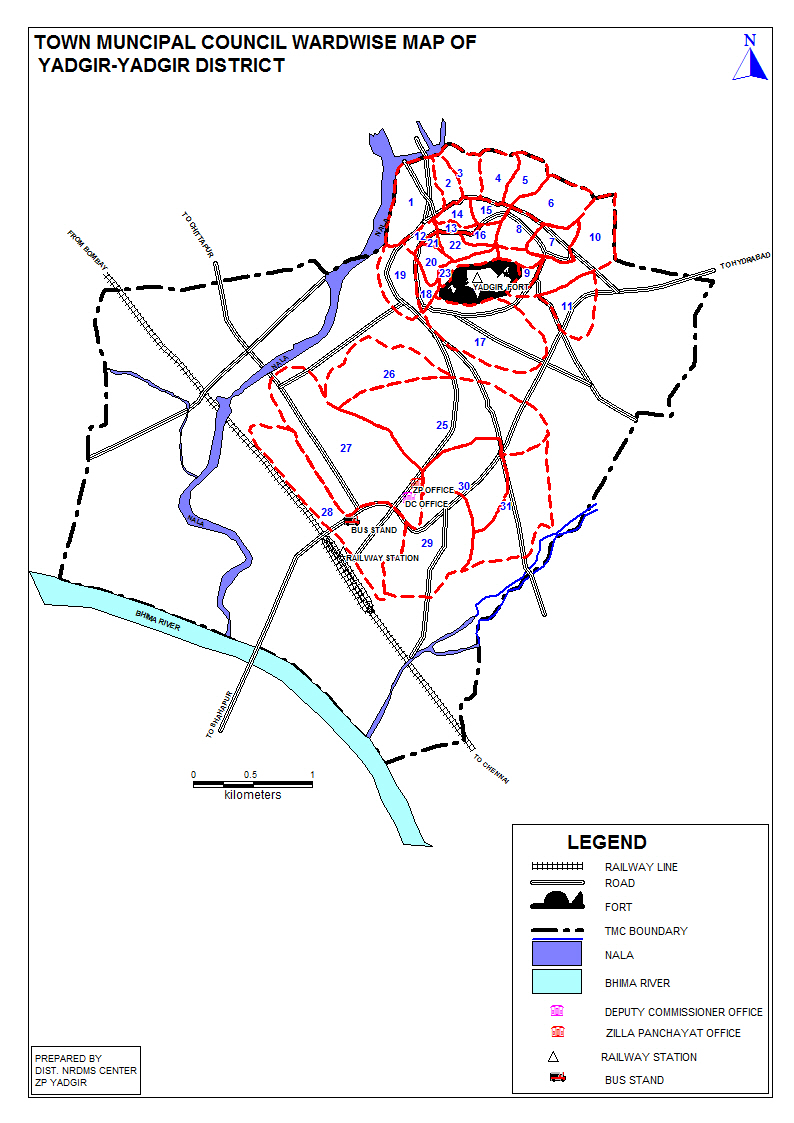
Yadgir TMC Wards

Yadgiri, also spelled as Yādagiri, is a city and the administrative headquarters of Yadgir district in the Indian state of Karnataka. It is also the administrative headquarters of Yadgir Taluku, one of the six taluks of Yadgir.

== Geography ==
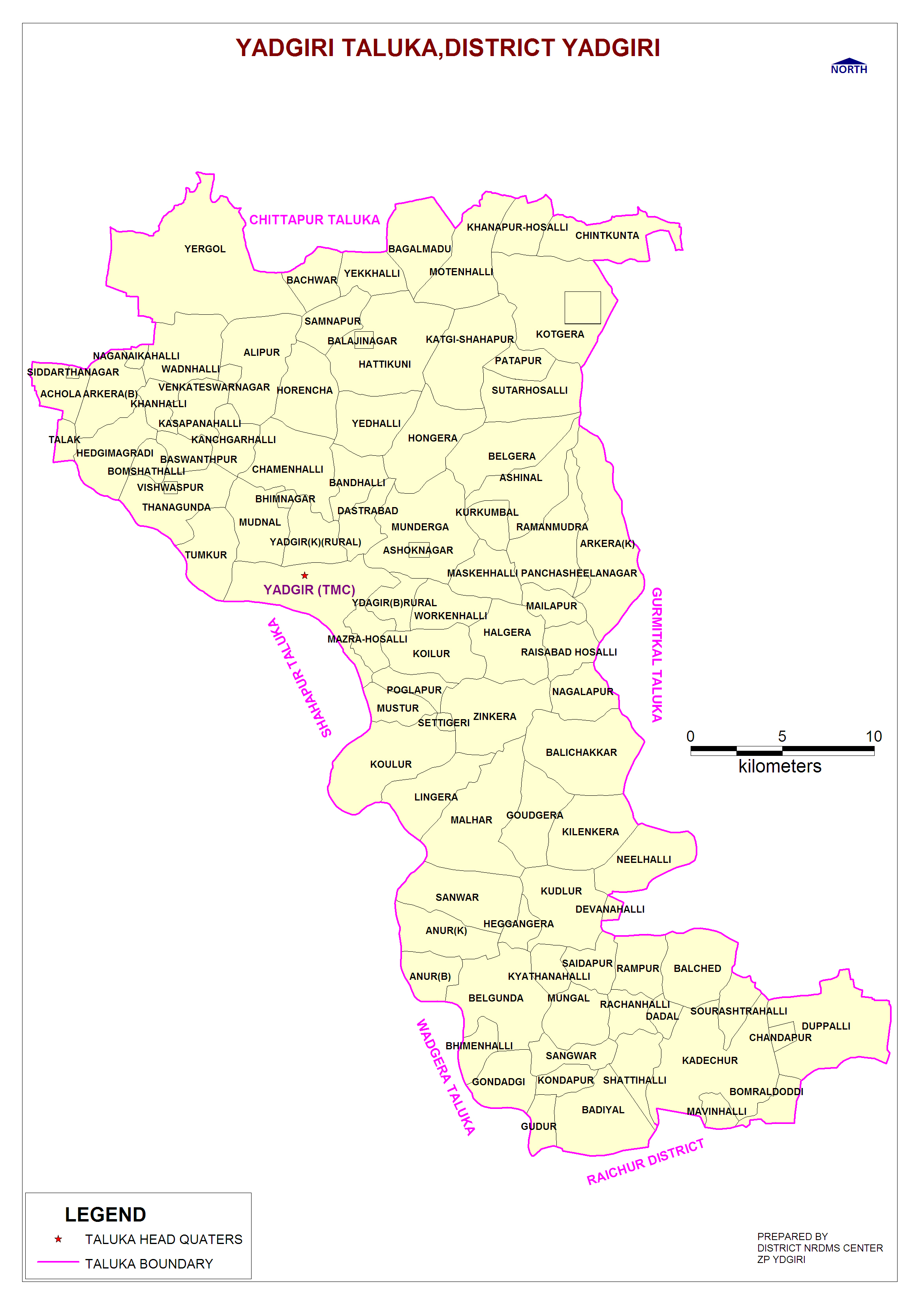
Yadagiri Taluk Map

Yadgir town covers an area of 5.6 square kilometres (2.2 sq mi). The Bhima River flows through the town.

== Overview ==
Yadgir, historically known as Yetagiri or Yadavagiri is dotted with many historical monuments and has a hill fort with three rounds of fortifications. There are three ancient temples, medieval mosques, tanks and wells on top of the hill. A pond, the Sanna Kere is located in the heart of the town.

== Demographics ==
In 2011, Yadgir had a population of 1,172,985 of whom males were 591,104 and females 581,881 respectively. In the 2001 census, Yadgir had a population of 956,180 of whom males were 482,347 and 473,933 were females. Yadgir district's population constitutes 1.92 percent of the total population of Karnataka. In the 2001 census, this figure for Yadgir district was at 1.81 percent.

There was a change of 22.67 percent in the population compared to the population as per the 2001 census. In the census of 2001, Yadgir district recorded an increase of 20.12 percent to its population compared to 1991.

The initial provisional data released by census India 2011 show that the density of Yadgir district for 2011 is 224 people per km^{2}. In 2001, Yadgir district's density was 183 people per km^{2}. Yadgir district covers an area of 5,225 km^{2}.

The average literacy rate of Yadgir in 2011 was 52.36, compared to 39.90 in 2001. Male and female literacy were 63.33 and 41.31 respectively. In the 2001 census, the same figures stood at 51.35 and 28.32. The total number of literates in Yadgir district was 516,940, of whom male and female were 313,797 and 203,143 respectively.

== History ==
The town was part of the empire of the Western Chalukyas from the 10th to the 12th centuries. The name Yadgir (historically Yetagiri) is derived from its early medieval rulers, the Yadavas or Sevuna Their establishments were on a hill ('giri' in Kannada means hill). Major economic development of the city took place under Philip Meadows Taylor, the British administrator of the principality of Shorapur.

== Heritage and tourist sites ==
1. Yadgir Fort
2. Vanadurga Fort

== Transport ==
Yadgir Railway Station

Yadgir has a broad gauge railway station, Yadgir railway station under the South Central Railway's Guntakal division.

State Highway 15 passes through the city.

== Notable people ==
- Baburao Chinchansur - Indian Politician
- Sharanabasappa Darshanapur - Indian Politician
- Kollur Mallappa - freedom fighter and Indian politician
- Venkatreddy Mudnal - Indian politician
- Narasimha Nayak (Raju Gowda) - Indian politician
- Rafeeq Saudagar - Indian Urdu poet
- Vidyadhar Guruji Sayanna - freedom fighter and Indian politician
