= Yadgir district =

- District of Karnataka
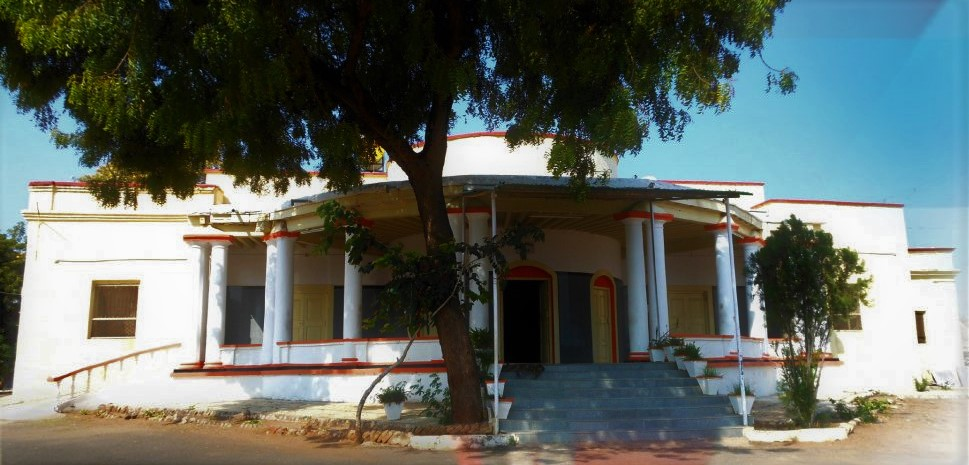
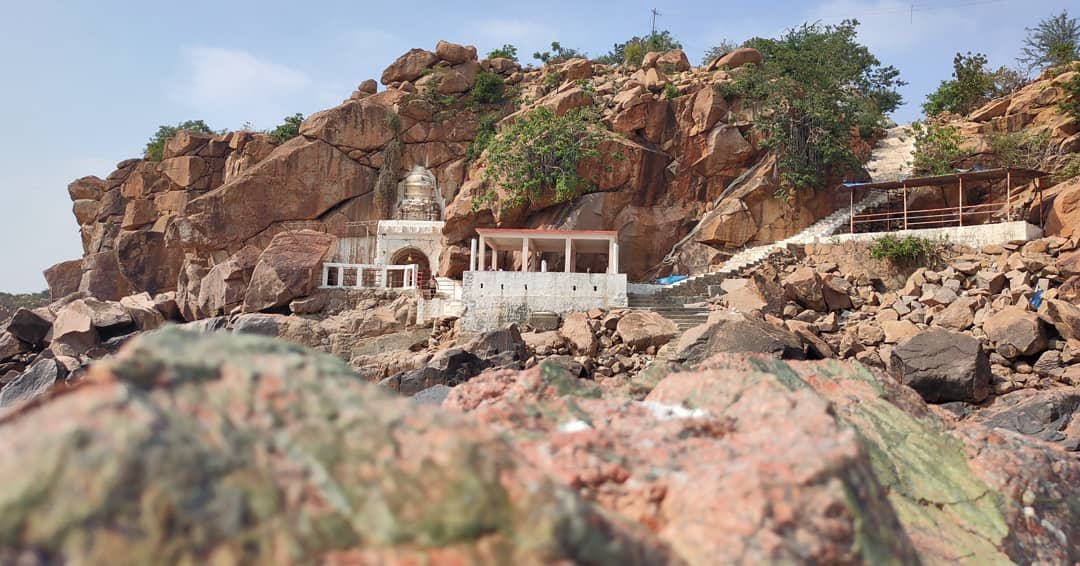
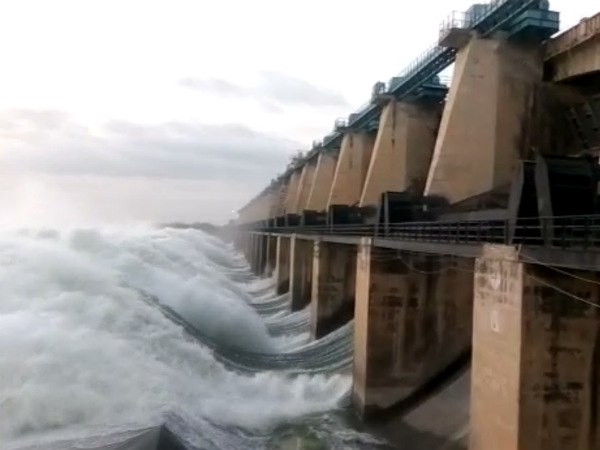
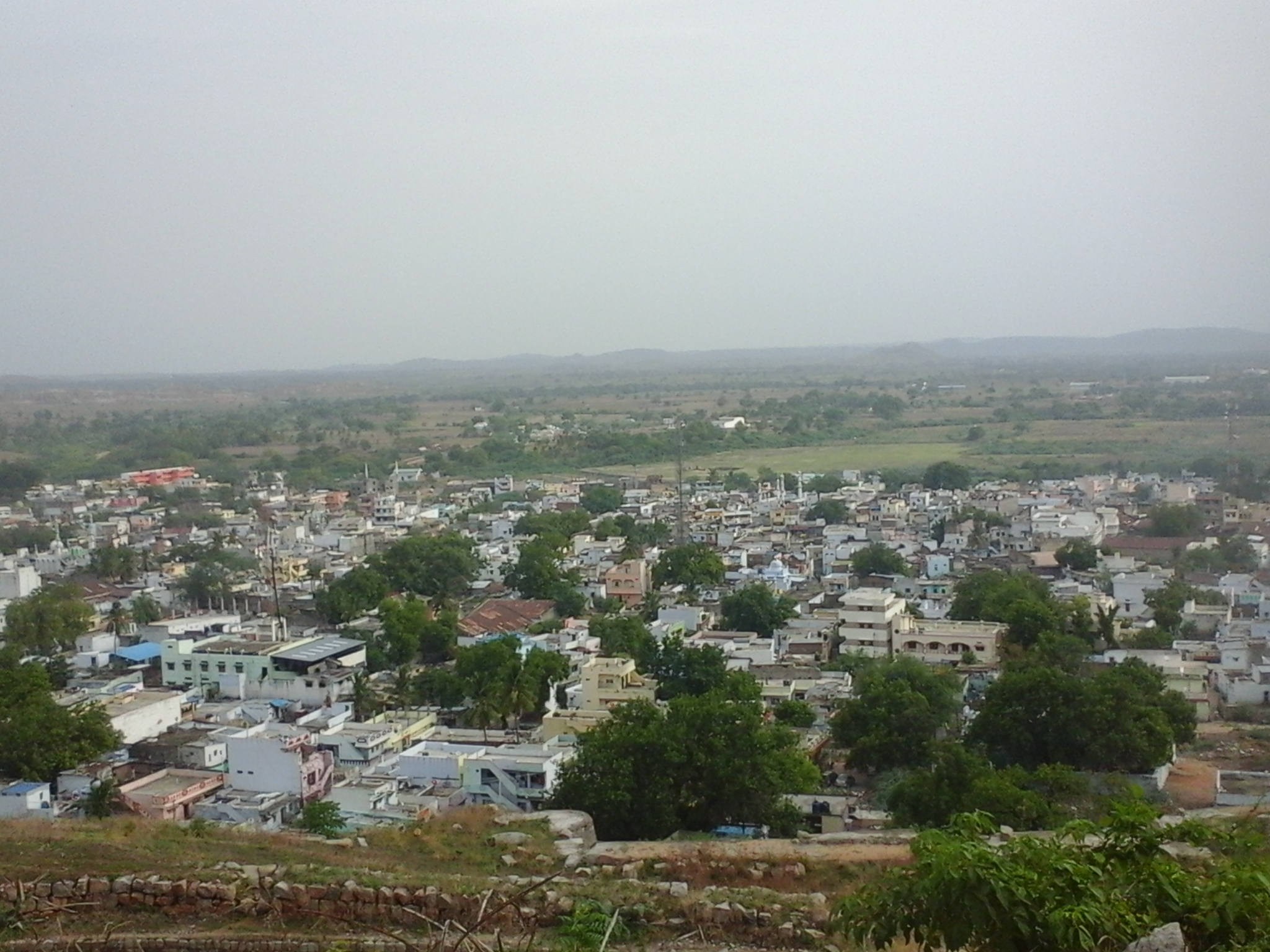
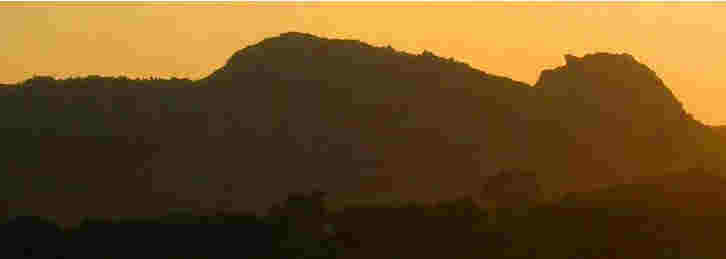
- Clockwise from top-left: Taylor Manzil, Chaya Bhagavathi Temple, Basava Sagara, Yadgir town view, Sleeping Buddha Hill
- Nicknames: Girinagara, Daal Bowl of state
- Location in Karnataka
- Coordinates: 16.75°N 77.13°E
- Country: India
- State: Karnataka
- Formation: 10 April 2010
- Founder: Government of Karnataka
- Headquarters: Yadgir
- Talukas: Shahpur, Surpur, Yadgir, Gurmitkal, Hunsgi, Wadgera

Government
  - Deputy Commissioner & District Magistrate: Shree Harshal Bhoyar (IAS)

Area
  - Total: 5,234 km^{2} (2,021 sq mi)

Population (2011)
  - Total: 1,174,271
  - Density: 224.4/km^{2} (581.1/sq mi)

Languages
  - Official: Kannada
- Time zone: UTC+5:30 (IST)
- Vehicle registration: KA 33
- Website: yadgir.nic.in

Yadgir district is one of the 31 districts of Karnataka state in southern India.This district was carved out of Kalaburagi district as the 30th district of Karnataka on 10 April 2010. Yadgir town is the administrative headquarters of the district. The district occupies an area of 5,160.88 km^{2} (1,992.63 sq mi).

Yadgir district is very rich in cultural traditions. The vast stretch of fertile black soil of the district is known for bumper red gram and jowar crops. The district is the Daal bowl of the state. The district is also known for cluster of cement industries and a distinct stone popularly known as "Malakheda Stone".

Two main rivers, Krishna and Bhima, and a few tributaries flow in this region. The upper Krishna project and Shahapur Taluka in Bendebembali "Core Green Sugar Factory yet to be started. Yadgir which is known the cement, textile, leather, and chemical production in the industrial sectors. The Agriculture College located in Bheemarayana Gudi (B.Gudi).

== Divisions ==
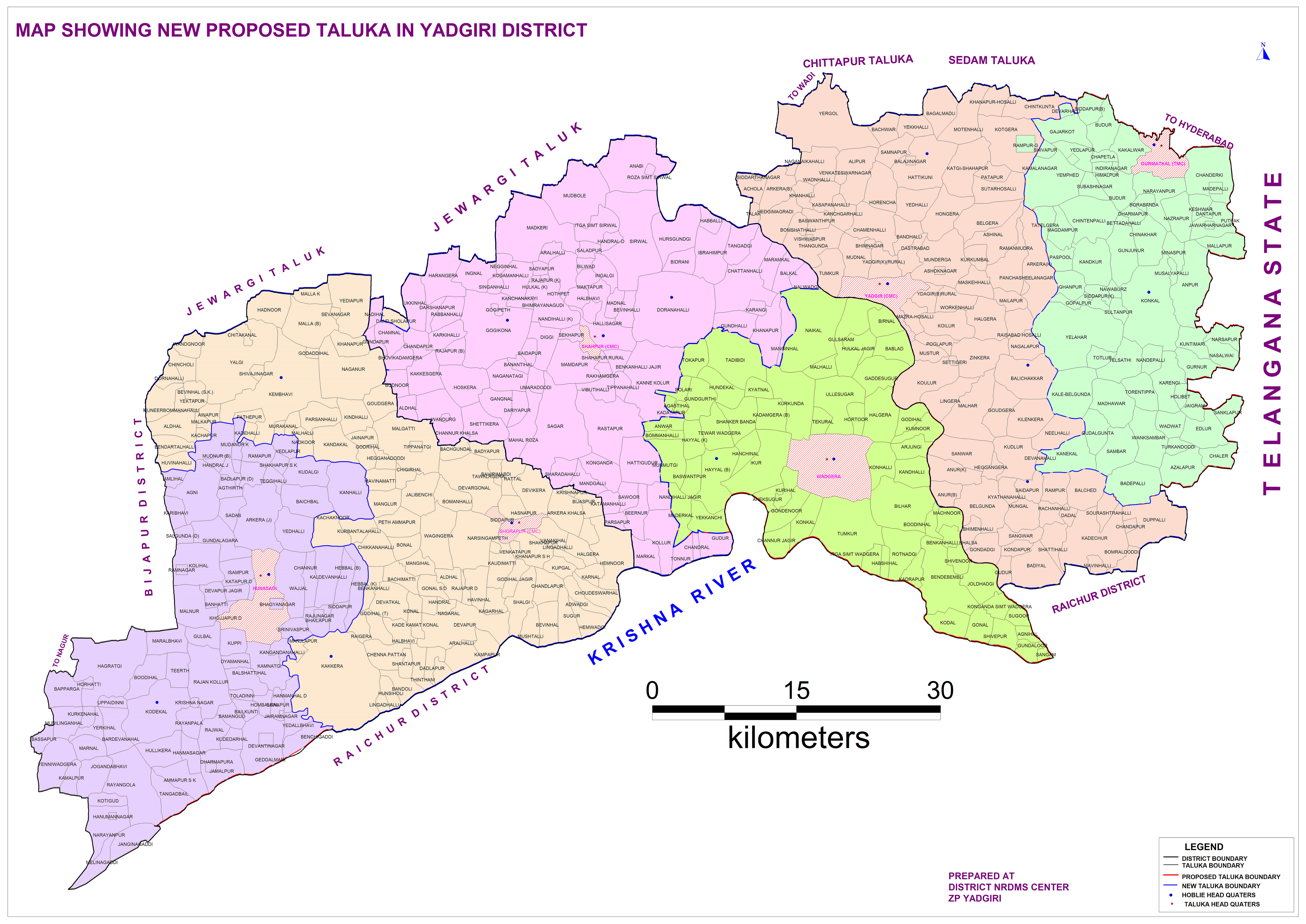
Yadgir district Map

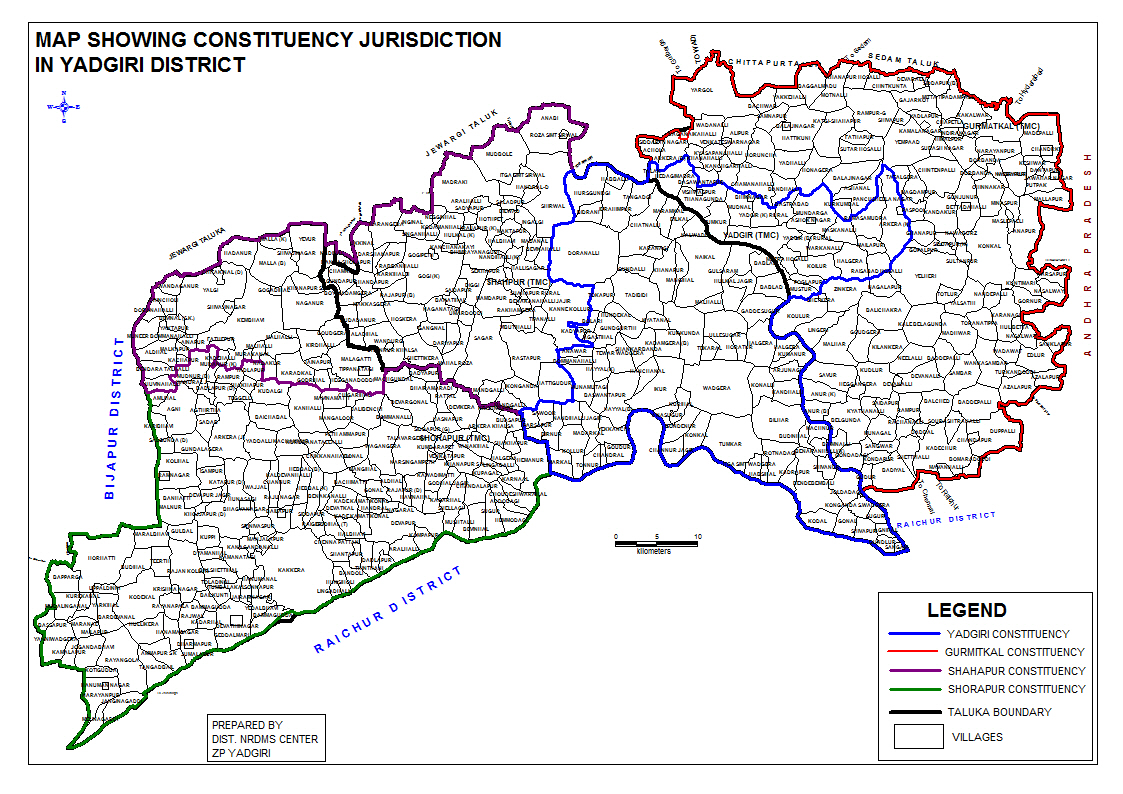
Yadgir district Vidhana Sabha constituencies Map

The district comprises six taluks: Shahapur, Wadgera, Hunasagi, Surapura, Yadgir and Gurmatkal. The district has 16 hoblies, 117 Gram Panchayats, 519 villages (inhabited & uninhabited) and four municipalities.

== History ==
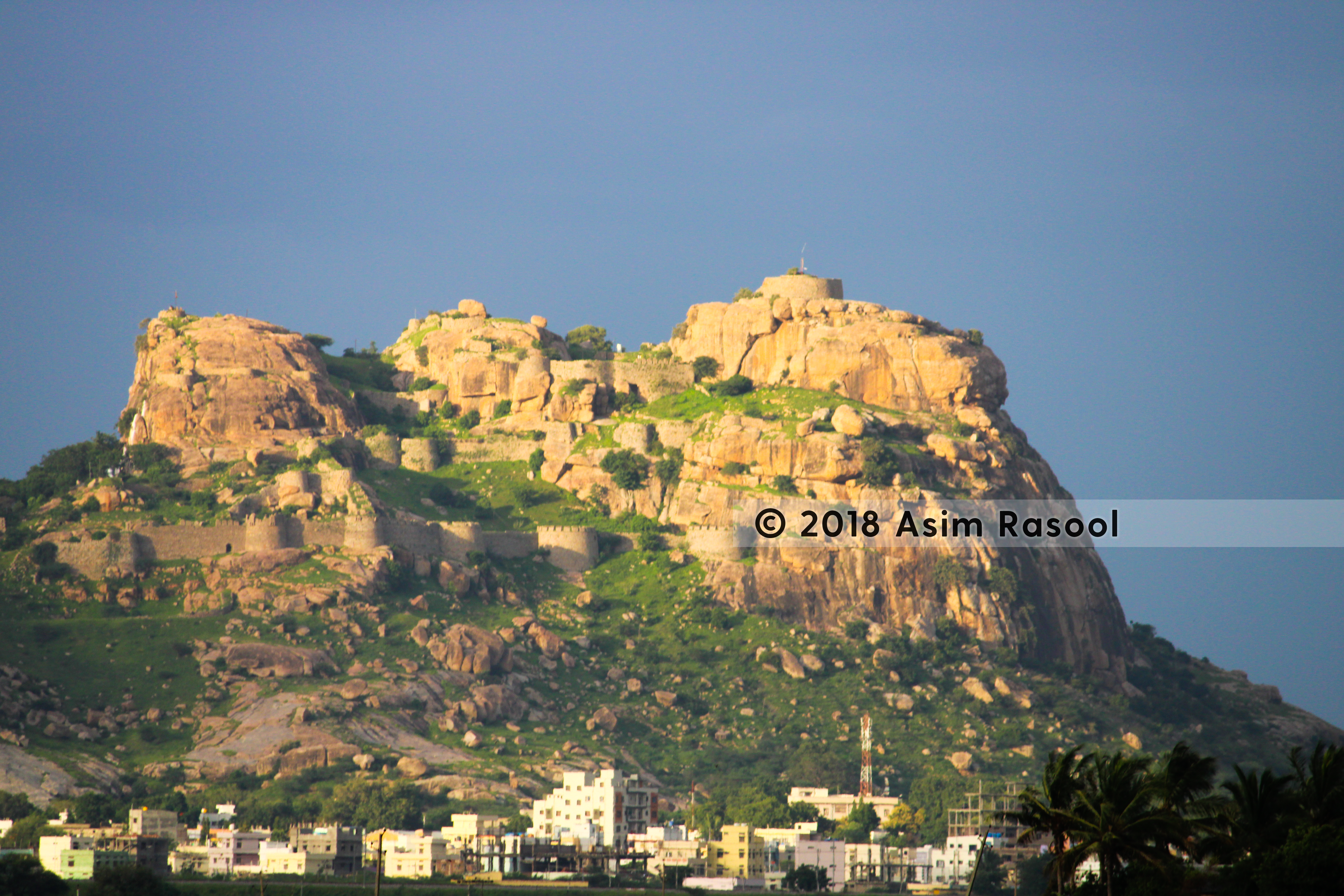
Yadgir Fort in 2019

Yadgir, popularly called as "Yadavagiri" by the local people, has deep roots in history. The famous dynasties of the south, the Satavahanas, the Chalukyas of Badami, the Rastrakutas all ruled over this area. From 1347 to 1425 it was the capital of the Yadava dynasty. Shahis, the Adil shahis, the Nizam Shahis have ruled over the district.

In 1504 Yadgiri (Gulbarga) was permanently annexed to Adil Shahi kingdom of Bijapur. In 1657 with the invasion of Mir Jumla it passed into the hands of Mughals. Later with the establishment of Asaf Jahi Dynasty of Hyderabad (1724–1948) Yadgir and Gulbarga were under it. In 1863 when Nizam Government formed Jillabandi, Surpur (Shorapur) became district headquarters, with nine Talukas of which Gulbarga was one of them. In 1873 Gulbarga was formed into Separate district with seven taluks. With reorganization of states in 1956 Gulbarga became Part of Karnataka State and Divisional headquarters. Yadgiri came under Gulbarga district.

The cabinet meeting held at Gulbarga on 26 September 2008 resolved that Yadgir would be formed as new district. Accordingly, the Chief Minister declared Yadgir as new district. The Government appointed an IAS officer as Special Officer for Yadgir district until the final notification of district was published in the Karnataka Gazette. Although the Government issued Gazette Notification declared Yadgir a district of Karnataka State on 26 December 2009, it did not take effect until 30 December 2009.

== Subdivisions ==
Yadgir district presently comprises the following 6 talukas

1. Yadgir
2. Wadgera
3. Shahapur, Karnataka
4. Gurmitkal
5. Hunsgi
6. Surpur

== Demographics ==
Historical population
Year	Pop.	±% p.a.
1901	296,302	—
1911	323,617	+0.89%
1921	297,917	−0.82%
1931	332,354	+1.10%
1941	355,577	+0.68%
1951	407,214	+1.37%
1961	435,838	+0.68%
1971	531,213	+2.00%
1981	638,385	+1.85%
1991	796,031	+2.23%
2001	956,180	+1.85%
2011	1,174,271	+2.08%

Religions in Yadgir district (2011)
Religion	Percent
Hinduism	85.00%
Islam	13.22%
Christianity	0.74%
Buddhism	0.68%
Other or not stated	0.36%

According to the 2011 census Yadgir district has a population of 1,174,271, roughly equal to the nation of Timor-Leste or the US state of Rhode Island. This gives it a ranking of 404th in India (out of a total of 640). The district has a population density of 224 inhabitants per square kilometre (580/sq mi). Its population growth rate over the decade 2001-2011 was 22.67%. Yadgir has a sex ratio of 987 females for every 1000 males, and a literacy rate of 51.83%. 18.79% of the population lives in urban areas. Scheduled Castes and Scheduled Tribes make up 23.28% and 12.51% of the population respectively.

Languages of Yadgir district (2011)
1. Kannada (74.1%)
2. Urdu (12.0%)
3. Lambadi (6.39%)
4. Telugu (5.20%)
5. Hindi (1.11%)
6. Others (1.27%)

At the time of the 2011 census, 74.06% of the population spoke Kannada, 11.97% Urdu, 6.39% Lambadi, 5.20% Telugu and 1.11% Hindi as their first language.

== Education ==
It has 1,024 primary schools, 149 high schools, 40 pre-university colleges, six degree colleges, and 1 polytechnic institute.

Yadgir district has 933 primary schools, out of which 464 are lower primary schools, 469 are higher primary schools and 121 high school having classes VIII to X, which are run by education department. There are 1223 Anganwadi centers run by the Department of Women & Child Development. 605 schools provide lower primary education. Out of 605 schools, 464 schools are run by education department, 1 school by social welfare department, 3 are aided schools and 137 are unaided schools. 587 Schools are providing higher primary education. Out of 587 schools 469 schools are run by education department, 15 schools are run by social welfare department, 26 schools are aided schools, and 77 are unaided schools. 200 Schools are providing High school education. Out of 200 schools, 119 schools are run by education department, 16 schools are run by social welfare department, 15 schools are aided schools and 50 are unaided schools.

A project to support high schools to integrate Information and communications technology with teaching-learning has been launched with the education department, this includes use of free and open source applications like Geogebra, Phet, and Freemind. Participating schools include GHS Honagera. The project Kalike Samrudhi Upakrama involves an umbrella of NGOs including Kalike, and IT for Change.

== Medical facilities ==
The district has three hospitals, three ayurvedic hospitals, 37 public health centres, six community health centers, 20 dispensaries and 120 family welfare sub-centers.

== Places to visit ==
- Yadgir Fort
- Lumbini Park, Yadgir
- The Dhab Dabi waterfall is about 5 km from Gurmitkal and about 30 km from Yadgir.
- Chintanalli is famous for the temple of Lord Gavi Siddeshwara where the lord resides in a cave with natural water flowing over the temple and falling at the entrance; those entering the temple must walk through this waterfall. There is also a bridge constructed across the Bheema river, which is some 4 km from the city well connected by road.
- Sleeping Buddha in Shahapur taluk consists of four hills.
- The tomb of Sufi saint Syed Khundmir Bukhari in Sagar is also known as "Ankus Khan Wali".
- Kanaganahalli - The ancient Buddhist archeological site where the only ever found sculpture depicting King Ashoka with his family was found
- Sannati - One of the 54 Shakti Peethas, with more than 2500 year old history and the presiding goddess is mother Chandrala Parameshwari
- Abbetumkur - The divine place of samadhi of Shri Vishwaradhya, A yogi of highest order belonging to Dashamahavidya Sadhana to be specific Maa Bagulamukhi
- Vibhutihalli - village next to Shahapur city with Paleolithic stone structures which were used for calculating time and celestial positions
- Kollur Bridge - A small village next to Krishna river where the great Kohinoor diamond was found
- Gogi Chanda Saheb Darga - The Muslim holy site where the bodies of founder of Bijapur Adil Shahi Sultanates & his next 3 generations have been buried
- Shorapur Palace - Also known as surpur, the kings of Shorapur were the first kings to defeat sultan Aurangzeb & Aurangzeb himself gave letter of appreciation to the kings which is still on display in the palace
- Bonal Bird Sanctuary - A bird sanctuary and wetland near Bonal village in the Shorapur taluk of Yadgir district.
- Hunasigi - The stone age archeological site where more than 15000 multipurpose stone tools, made up of brown chert were found here and is recognized as older stone age site than Pallavaram of Tamilnadu
- Raichur (Lok Sabha constituency)
