= Agastihal =

- village
- Location in Karnataka, India Agastihal (India)
- Coordinates: 16°38′50″N 076°55′40″E
- Country: India
- State: Karnataka
- District: Yadgir
- Taluka: Wadgera
- Gram panchayat: Gundgurthi
- Talukas: Shahapur

Government
  - Type: Panchayat raj
  - Body: Village Panchayat

Population (2001)
  - Total: 163

Languages
  - Official: Kannada
- Time zone: UTC+5:30 (IST)
- ISO 3166 code: IN-KA
- Vehicle registration: KA
- Civic agency: Village Panchayat
- Website: karnataka.gov.in

Agastihal is a small village in the southern state of Karnataka, India. Administratively Agastihal is under Gundgurthi panchayat village, Wadgera Taluka of Yadgir district in Karnataka. Agastihal is 2.7 km by road southwest of Gundgurthi, and 7 km by road northeast of Hattigudur.

== Demographics ==
At the 2001 census, Agastihal had 163 inhabitants, with 81 males and 82 females.
