= Aldhal =

Aldhal may refer to:

- Aldhal, Belgaum, village in Hukeri Taluka, Belgaum District, Karnataka, India
- Aldhal, Shahapur, village in Shahapur Taluka, Yadgir District, Karnataka, India
- Aldhal, Shorapur, panchayat village in Shorapur Taluka, Yadgir District, Karnataka, India
- Aldhal, Raichur, village in Manvi Taluka, Raichur District, Karnataka, India
