= Aldhal, Shahapur =

Aldhal
- Village
- Location within Karnataka Location within India
- Coordinates: 16°38′15″N 076°39′34″E
- Country: India
- State: Karnataka
- District: Yadgir district
- Taluka: Shahapur

Government
  - Type: Panchayati raj (India)
  - Body: Gram panchayat

Population (2001)
  - Total: 1,051

Languages
  - Official: Kannada
- Time zone: UTC+5:30 (IST)
- ISO 3166 code: IN-KA
- Vehicle registration: KA
- Website: karnataka.gov.in

Aldhal is a village in the southern state of Karnataka, India. Administratively, it is under Kakkasgera panchayat village, Shahpur Taluka of Yadgir district in Karnataka. Aldhal is 5 km by road west of the village of Wanadurga and 9.5 km by road southwest of the village of Hoskera. The nearest railhead is in Yadgir.

== Demographics ==
At the 2001 census, Aldhal had 1,051 inhabitants, with 558 males and 493 females.

== See also ==
- Shahapur
- Yadgir
