= Kattinahole =

Village in Karnataka, India

Coordinates: 13°51′49.5″N 74°54′54.11″E

Kattinahole is a small village in Hosanagara Taluk, Shimoga district of the Indian state of Karnataka. The local language of Kattinahole is Kannada.

== Geography ==
It is situated in Mookambika National Park, close to the Kodachadri hilltop. The surrounding forest and hills are typical of the tropical rain forest seen along India's Western Ghats.

Kattinahole is surrounded by Sagar Taluk to the North, Thirthahalli taluk to the South, Hosanagara Taluk to the East, and Byndoor Taluk to the West.

Its elevation is 644 meters.

== Economy ==
It has homestays for tourists.

== Education ==
Local colleges are Sharavathi First Grade College, Sagar Gangotri College of Law, Sahyadri Science College, Shravathi Dental College And Hospital and National Evening College of Commerce.

Its primary schools are Glps Kattinahole and Glps Kattinahole Cross.

== Transportation ==
Talaguppa Railway Station (near to Sagar), Sagar Jambagaru Railway Station (near to Sagar), Shimoga Railway Station (near to Shimoga) are the closest railway stations.

Road connections reach Sagar, Tirthahalli and Shimoga.

== See also ==
- Honnemardu
- Kodachaadri
- Mangalore
- Jog Falls
- Kollur
- Agumbe
