= Rastapur, Karnataka =

Rastapur
- Village
- Location within Karnataka Location within India
- Coordinates: 16°37′51″N 076°51′13″E
- Country: India
- State: Karnataka
- District: Yadgir district
- Taluka: Shahapur

Government
  - Type: Panchayat raj
  - Body: Gram panchayat

Population (2001)
  - Total: 4,173

Languages
  - Official: Kannada
- Time zone: UTC+5:30 (IST)
- ISO 3166 code: IN-KA
- Vehicle registration: KA
- Website: karnataka.gov.in

Rastapur is a panchayat village in the southern state of Karnataka, India. Administratively, Rastapur is under Shahapur Taluka of Yadgir district in Karnataka. Rastapur is 6 km by road east of the village of Sagar and 6.5 km by road northwest of the village of Hattigudur. The nearest railhead is in Yadgir.

== Demographics ==
As of 2001 census, Rastapur had 4,173 inhabitants, with 2,065 males and 2,108 females.
