= Nittur, Shimoga =

Village in Karnataka, India

Nittur, Shimoga in India

Nittur is a village located in Hosanagara Taluk, Shimoga District, Karnataka, India. The village is located in dense forest, on the Shimoga-Kollur state highway. Kodachadri peak falls within the jurisdiction of Nittur Grama Panchayat.

== Agriculture ==
The primary activity of villagers in and around Nittur is agriculture, with the majority of attention going to farming areca nuts.

== Kodachadri peak ==
Nittur is a starting point for one of the trekking routes to Kodachadri peak, which is located at about 15 km from the village. Kodachadri elevation 1312m, having a birth place of river Chakra flows towards north west and joins arabian sea at Gongolli. Kodachadri peak has thousands of years old adi Shankaracharya temple, Moola Mookambika resides as Parvati-Paramesheara here. Here you can find scientific wonder non corrosive cast iron pillar as Dwajastamba which was erected thousands of years, still this pillar is in good condition with rust even though this place witness heavy rainfall, chill winter, sunny summer as well as very nearest sea winds of arabian sea. Kodachadri hills popularly known as Sanjeevani parvat due to widely availability of hundreds of herbs, spices, aromatic resins like Halmaddi, dhoopa. Kodachadri has Parvati Parameshwara temple, Huliyappa Temple, Adi Shankaracharya temple- Shikhara, VenkatarayaDurge, Chitramoola cave, Agastya falls, Chakra-teertha pond which is an origin of Chakra River. Foothills of Kodachadri has various water falls including Hidlumane, Kukkanagudda Bird sanctuary, nearby places to visit Kollur Mookambika temple, Sigandoor Chowdeshwari Temple, Ikkeri Agoresheara Temple, Ramachandrapura mutt, historical places Bidanoor nagar fort, Kavaludurga/kavaledurge fort, BasavanBine bathing king complex, keladi Temple. Water bodies Chakra river, Varahi river, Sharavati river, Dams like Sampekattte dam, Chakra nagara dam, Mani dam, Kargal Dam, Madanoor or Hirebaskara dam, Talagalale dam etc.
