= Ananth Hegde Ashisara =

Indian Environmentalist

- Occupation: Environmentalist

Sri Ananth Hegde Ashisara is an environmentalist from Uttara Kannada District, Karnataka, India and chairman, Karnataka Biodiversity Board, government of Karnataka.

== Fight to protect Western Ghat ==
Mr. Ashisara is also the former chairperson of Western Ghats Task Force (WGTF) and is involved in protection of environment, especially Western Ghats, a World Heritage site. He is also convenor of Vriksh Raksha Andolan, a group of people from Malenadu dedicated to protect environment. He is involved in people's movement against mining activities in and around Ambaragudda hill range of Western Ghats located in Shimoga District, Karnataka.

He has put efforts to get arboreal heritage tag to 10 old trees of Karnataka, which include Big Banyan tree, Bangalore (400 years old), Adansonia digitata – Malvaceae, Bijapur Taluk (600 years old), "Pilali" tree Ficus micro corpus, Banavasi, Uttara Kannada etc. He expressed concern over safety of nuclear energy in the wake of damage experienced by nuclear power projects in Japan tsunami (2010).

== See also ==
- Ambaragudda
- Kodachadri
