= Bhimarayanagudi =

Bhimarayanagudi B.Gudi
- village
- Location in Karnataka, India
- Coordinates: 16°43′42″N 76°47′53″E
- Country: India
- State: Karnataka
- Division: Gulbarga
- District: Yadgir
- Taluka: Shahapur

Government
  - Body: Gram panchayat

Population (2001)
  - Total: 4,791

Languages
  - Official: Kannada
- Time zone: UTC+5:30 (IST)
- ISO 3166 code: IN-KA
- Vehicle registration: KA
- Website: karnataka.gov.in

Bhimarayanagudi is a town administered by a notified area committee in Shahpur Taluk of Yadgir district, in the state of Karnataka, India. It is approximately 4 km by road north of Shahpur town. It is also referred to as B.Gudi and Bhimarayanagudi camp.

B.Gudi got its name from the temple ("Gudi" in the Kannada language) of deity Hanuman; in the local language, Hanuman is called Bheemaraya. Hence, the camp has the name Bhimrayanagudi.

== Demographics ==
As of 2001 the India census records, Bhimarayanagudi had a population of 4,791. Males constituted 51% of the population and females 49%. Bhimarayanagudi had an average literacy rate of 74%, higher than the national average of 59.5%; with male literacy of 82% and female literacy of 65%. 12% of the population was under 6 years of age.

== Education ==
Schools

The camp has a primary school and a high school run by the Karnataka government. It also has an English medium school called Krishna English Medium School run by VHP.

Colleges

The camp has a PU College run by the Karnataka government plus a further PU College by English Medium School.

A Jawahar Navodaya Vidyalaya (JNV) school was situated in the camp area, but it has since been moved to Hothpet village some distance from the camp.

College of Agriculture at Bheemarayanagudi started during 2001 under University of Agricultural Sciences, Dharwad. After the formation of University of Agricultural Sciences, Raichur (an exclusive Agricultural University for Kalayan-Karnataka Region with headquarter at Raichur), College of Agriculture, Bheemarayanagudi is a component college. B.Sc. (Agri.) Hons. degree and Diploma in Agriculture are offered. Agricultural Research Station is also attached and cater the needs of farming community through seed production, integrated nutrient management, integrated farming systems, organic farming, fish, goat and animal husbandry.
