= Raghaveshwara Bharati =

36th peetadipathi of ramachandrapura mutt

Personal life
- Born: Harish Sharma Chaduravalli, Sagara, Karnataka, India
- Website: srisamsthana.org

Religious life
- Religion: Hinduism
- Order: Advaita Vedanta
- Philosophy: Advaita Vedanta

Religious career
- Teacher: Raghavendra Bharati

Sri Raghaveshwara Bharati (born Harish Sharma) is an Indian Hindu monk and the 36th pontiff of the Ramachandrapura Math, a traditional Advaita Vedanta monastery headquartered in Hosanagara, Karnataka. He succeeded Sri Raghavendra Bharati in 1999 after receiving sannyasa (renunciation) in 1994. He is known for promoting Vedic culture and leading various social initiatives related to cow protection, environmental conservation, and rural welfare.

Raghaveshwara Bharati has also been involved in legal controversies, including allegations of rape and sexual assault, which were later dismissed on procedural grounds by the Karnataka High Court.

== Birth and childhood ==
Sri Raghaveshwara Bharati in his early days before taking initiation was known by the name Harish Sharma. He was born in the village called Chaduravalli in Sagara, Karnataka .

== Education ==
He studied Vedantha, Yoga, Astrology and Sanskrit in Gokarna and later in Mysore.

== Sannyasa and after ==
On 28 April 1999, Sri Bharati was made pontiff following the sadgati of Jagadguru Sri Sri Raghavendra Bharathi mahaswamiji

== Religious thought and social responsibility ==
He stresses the need to protect Vedic culture, and its activities along with other social activities.

One of the plans instituted by him in the Maṭhs is Musti Bikshe Yojana wherein each devotee keeps a fist full of rice daily as gift to the Maṭh, and collectively later feeds the needy and hunger, as old age orphans, hostels for homeless or at the time of natural calamity, etc.

He frequently conducts Rama Katha (Story of Rama) for the general public — a blend of discourse, dance, music and drawing — all that depict various incidents of Ramayana at various places.

=== Eye hospital ===
He established the Bharathiya Nethra Chikitshalya in Mujangavu, Kumbla in Kasaragod dist, to cater the need of rural eye patients, criss-crossing the boundaries of religion in social service.

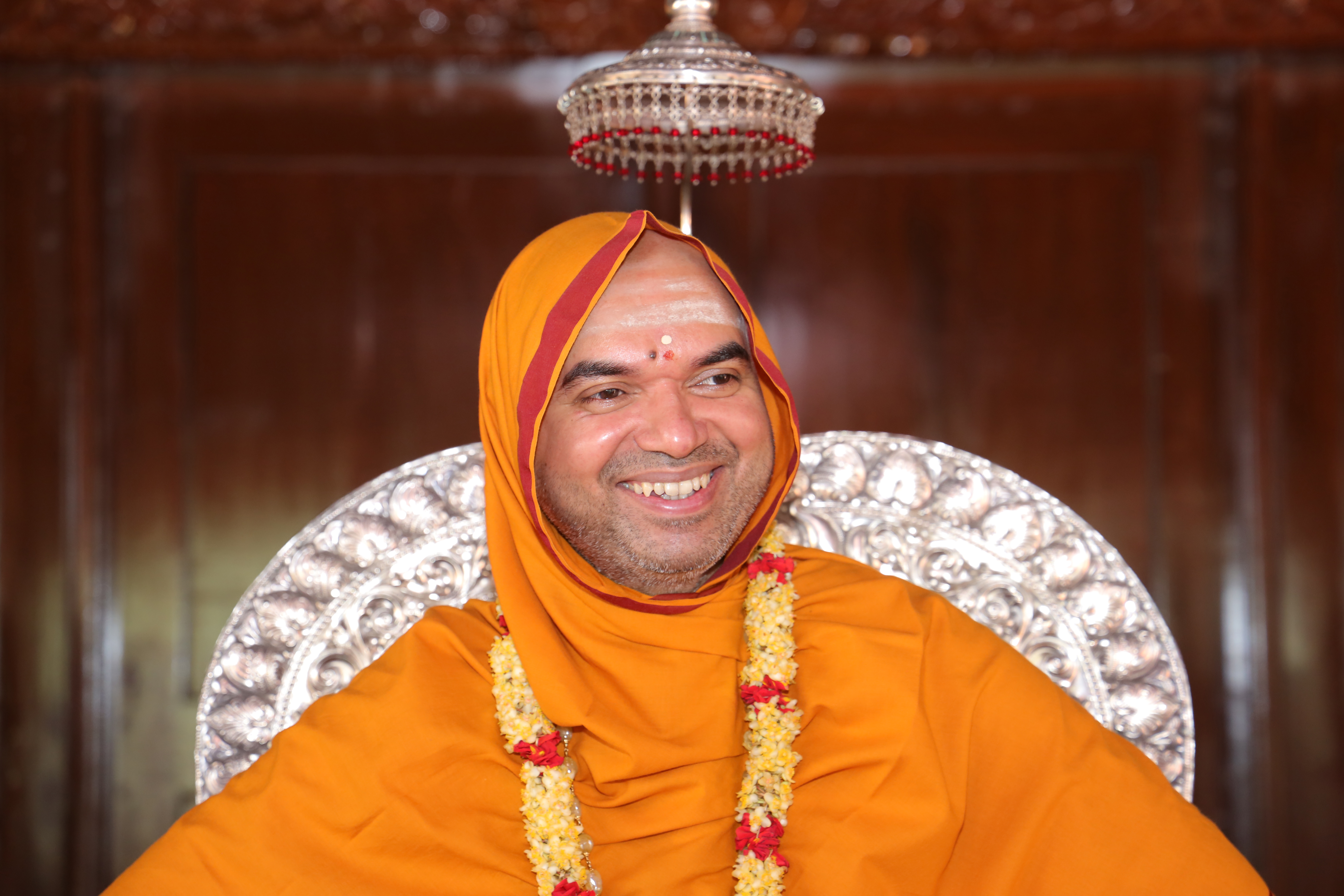
36th Maṭhadhipati of Ramachandrapura Maṭh

=== Preventing Mining at Ambaragudda ===
Sri Raghaveshwara Bharati led a protest march by environmentalists against mining in and around Kodachadri. For opposing mining activities, he has to face the ire of mining agencies.

Under his Project Vanajeevana Yajna, thousands traditional and medicinal plants have been planted. Citizens are encouraged to plant at least five saplings every year under the project.

At 2003, Manganese mining activities started at Ambaragudda (Kodachadri, Karnataka), situated at western ghats (India). Mine owners promised to build hospitals, roads for locals and got an approval for mining of 18 acres. But, they unearthed hundreds of acres of land unofficially. Sri Raghaveshwara Bharathi Swamiji of Ramachandrapura Maṭh came to know about this matter and decided to fight against mining at Ambaragudda. He personally visited the place, looked at the casualty and created a stage called Kodachadri Sanjeevini to fight against mining. He brought locals, Forest officials, local MLAs into this stage and protested all over the place. As a result of this movement, forest department forfeit mining machines, equipments and stopped mining activities at Ambaragudda. Officials from Ministry of Environment visited the place and agreed upon casualty done to the environment. State High Court ordered to stop mining activities and encouraged to protect environment. On 16.05.2005, locals and devotees of maṭh planted new plants at Ambaragudda. Swamiji had a life threat in this case and Karnataka State Government had appointed a gun man for his security. Today this place is announced as Natural Heritage Site by Biodiversity Board.

=== Preservation of indigenous cows ===
Sri Raghaveshwara Bharati has campaigned for the preservation of indigenous cow breeds through a programme called "Kamadugha". On 22 April 2007, he led a nine-day Vishwa Go-Sammelan (World Cow Conference).

Projects are on to start 108 goshalas, of which few are already started in Karnataka, Maharashtra, Kerala, Tamil Nadu. This work is highly noted, as so far no institutions in India, govt or NGO's, had started the work. The Maṭh has many breeds in its collection. Work is being done to preserve the same for the future. Some rare breeds as Amrithmahal, Vechur, which count less than 100 in numbers, are protected here. He has been working stressing the need to promote products other than milk products, as Go-ark, medicines from cow, Doopa, etc.

He also led and inspired the 108-day-long (30 September 2009 – 17 January 2010 ) 'Vishwa Mangala Gou Grama Yathra' with the support of various saints and Hindu organizations. The yathra covered the whole of India to highlight the importance of preservation and protection of cow with demands such as to declare cow as the national animal of India and to formulate laws to preserve various breeds of Indian cows. It ended with a big mass signature campaign signed by over 83 million people across India calling for the end of cruelty to cow and to declare cow a national animal which is then submitted to President of India on 31 January 2010. An 18-member delegation which visited the President of India was led by Bharati including yoga Guru Baba Ramdev, Pejavara Vishvesha Tirtha, many other senior saints and Shankaracharyas, religious leaders from Islam and Christianity, cow scientists, experts, organic farmers and leaders belonging to various organisations of the country.

=== Vishwa Mangala Gou Grama Yatra ===
Vishwa Mangala Gou Grama Yatra is an initiative organized covering many states which resulted in collection of over eight crores signatures over a petition seeking complete ban on cow slaughter. The petition was later submitted to Mrs. Pratibha Patil, the then President of India.

=== Vishwa Gou Sammelana ===
The World Cow Conference, which involved the participation of over 20 lakh devotees of indigenous cow lovers from 11 different countries.

=== Mangala Gou Yatra ===
This movement, named after Mangal Pandey, the hero of first freedom struggle of 1857, mainly covered the states of South India and some places in neighboring Maharashtra to create an awakening among the masses on the need to preserve the indigenous cow breeds.

=== Flood Relief ===
Social help like flood relief is another key contribution of the Maṭha. Sri Ramchandrapura Math's Bharatiya Gou Parivara team had completed a task of collecting and distributing about 25 loads of fodder, necessary items worth approximately four lakhs, one ton of rice, 18 tonnes of animal fodder, to the flood affected regions all over Karnataka.

=== Kamadugha’s mission is to achieve this vision through four themes: Protection, Conservation, Awareness, Research ===
Kamadugha is a holistic mission of Sri RamachandrapuraMatha to popularise the benefits of protecting and conserving Desi cow (Bos Indicus) to mankind through historical evidence and research based outcomes.

=== Gouswarga ===
Gouswarga is a goushala (cow shelter) run by the Kamadugha Trust of Sri Ramachandrapura Matha. It was started on 27 May 2018 at Bhankuli near Siddapura in Uttara Kannada district, Karnataka. The shelter keeps 15 breeds of indigenous cattle and has a capacity of about 1,000 animals. It has about 2.5 acres of pasture for grazing, and grass is grown on about 45 acres of nearby land.

=== Vishnugupta VishwaVidyapeetham (VVV) ===
VVV is an initiative by SriSri RaghaveshwaraBharati MahaSwamiji, aiming to preserve and promote the glorious traditions of Bharata for the future generations. Here a blend of modern education and traditional education will be taught to students, seeking to imbibe in them knowledge of Indian traditional arts and languages, and the practices of Sanatana Dharma.The main motivation behind the establishment of Vishnugupta Vishwa Vidyapeetham is reclaiming the lost Takshashila in the country. Hence, VVV is named after Chanakya, the great guru of Takshashila

== Rape Allegations ==
=== Sexual assault cases ===
Bharati has been accused in two separate rape cases, both involving women who were associated with Ramachandrapura Math.

In the first case, a woman referred to in court documents as Geetha (name changed), a former singer and disciple at the math, accused him of sexually assaulting her multiple times between 2011 and 2014. She alleged that the assaults began under the pretext of spiritual guidance and were continued during religious tours and events. In 2014, she filed a police complaint after confiding in her husband. A trial court later acquitted Raghaveshwara Bharathi, stating that the prosecution had not established a strong enough case to proceed to trial. An appeal against this acquittal is pending in the Karnataka High Court.

In the second case, the seer was accused of raping a 15-year-old girl in 2006. The complainant, a former student at a school run by the math, alleged that the assault occurred during a private ritual called "Rama Darshan" conducted at the math. She further alleged that she was threatened and later abducted by individuals including advocate Aruna Shyam, who was named as a co-accused in the case. Charges under the Protection of Children from Sexual Offences (POCSO) Act were filed, and the matter is currently under judicial consideration.

=== Judicial recusals and case developments ===
Since 2014, over ten Karnataka High Court judges have recused themselves from various cases involving the seer. Reasons cited or speculated include potential conflicts of interest, prior professional associations, and personal connections to the parties involved. The high number of recusals has led to delays in the judicial process. Similar recusals by other judges followed over the years.

Additional allegations related to threats and intimidation of the complainants have been raised. In the second case, advocate Aruna Shyam, who also served as Additional Advocate General of Karnataka, was granted anticipatory bail after being accused of kidnapping and threatening the survivor.

As of 2022, proceedings in both cases continue, with hearings and appeals pending before various judicial benches.

== Other Allegations ==
=== Allegations related to Gauri Lankesh murder ===
In September 2017, one of the alleged rape victims filed a complaint with the Special Investigation Team (SIT) probing the murder of journalist Gauri Lankesh. They alleged that Bharati might have had an indirect role in the murder due to critical articles written about him by Gauri Lankesh. According to them, her writings had exposed past allegations involving the Bharati, including sexual assault claims. The SIT reviewed the documents submitted by the couple and, according to media reports, found no direct evidence linking the seer to the crime.

== Honors ==
He declined the offer of an honorary doctorate from Gulbarga University in 2013.

== Notable disciples ==
- Suresh Oberoi and Vivek Oberoi Bollywood actors
- Arvind Bhat, PV Sindhu International Badminton players
- Rama Jois, Former Chief Justice of the Punjab and Haryana High Court, Former Governor of Jharkhand and Bihar
- Radhe Shyam Agarwal, Indian Entrepreneur, Founder of Emami Industries, Kolkata
- Anant Kumar Hegde, Former Union Minister and current MP (Lok Sabha) of Uttara Kannada
- Nalin Kumar Kateel, BJP Karnataka State President
- Tejasvi Surya MP Bengaluru South and National President of Bharatiya Janata Yuva Morcha
