= Vanadurga =

Vanadurga or Vana Durga may refer to:

- Vanadurga (goddess), a manifestation of goddess Durga
- Wanadurga, a village in Yadgir district, Karnataka, India
  - Vanadurga Fort, a fort near Wanadurga village
