= Adagodi =

- village
- Location in Karnataka, India Adagodi (India)
- Coordinates: 12.9715987°N 77.5945627°E
- Country: India
- State: Karnataka
- District: Shimoga
- Talukas: Hosanagara

Government
  - Body: Village Panchayat

Languages
  - Official: Kannada
- Time zone: UTC+5:30 (IST)
- Nearest city: Shimoga
- Civic agency: Village Panchayat

Adagodi is a village in Shimoga district, Karnataka, India. It is located in the Hosanagara taluk.

== See also ==
- Shimoga
- Districts of Karnataka
