= Nagodi =

Village in Karnataka, India

Nagodi is a village in Shimoga district, Karnataka, India. It is located 14 km from Kollur towards Shimoga and village is situated at the base of Kodachadri in the Western Ghats.
