= Gogipeth =

- village
- Location in Karnataka, India Gogipeth (India)
- Coordinates: 16°44′07″N 076°44′39″E
- Country: India
- State: Karnataka
- District: Yadgir
- Talukas: Shahapur

Government
  - Body: Gram panchayat

Population (2001)
  - Total: 6,557

Languages
  - Official: Kannada
- Time zone: UTC+5:30 (IST)
- ISO 3166 code: IN-KA
- Vehicle registration: KA
- Website: karnataka.gov.in

Gogipeth is a village in the southern state of Karnataka, India. It is located in the Shahapur taluk of Yadgir district in Karnataka. Gogipeth is a companion village to Gogikona which lies less than half a kilometre to the southeast, across a small stream, and together the two are often known as "Gogi".

== Demographics ==
As of 2001 India census, Gogipeth had a population of 6,557 with 3,297 males and 3,260 females.

== See also ==
- Yadgir
