= Hoskera =

- Village
- Location within Karnataka Location within India
- Coordinates: 16°39′46″N 076°45′04″E
- Country: India
- State: Karnataka
- District: Yadgir district
- Taluka: Shahapur

Government
  - Type: Panchayati raj (India)
  - Body: Gram panchayat

Languages
  - Official: Kannada
- Time zone: UTC+5:30 (IST)
- ISO 3166 code: IN-KA
- Vehicle registration: KA
- Website: karnataka.gov.in

Hoskera is a panchayat village in Shahapur taluka of Yadgir district in Karnataka state, India. Hoskera is four kilometres by road north-northwest of Wanadurga, and just over eight kilometres south-southwest of Gogikona. The nearest railhead is in Yadgir.

There are three villages in the gram panchayat: Hoskera, Rajapur, and Shettikera.

== Demographics ==
At the 2001 census, the village of Hoskera had 2,773 inhabitants, with 1,410 males and 1,363 females.
