= Ramachandrapura Mutt =

Hindu Advaita Vedanta monastery in Karnataka, India

Ramachandrapura Matha
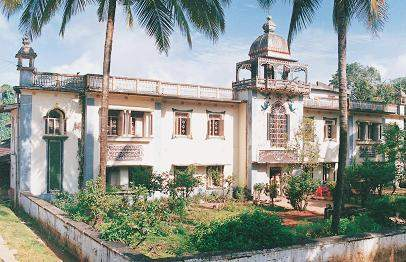
- Ramachandrapura Math, Hosanagara

- Location of the headquarters in Karnataka, India Ramachandrapura Mutt (India)

Religion
- Affiliation: Hinduism
- District: Shimoga
- Deity: Rama (Rāmaparivāra), Chandramauleeswaralinga
- Governing body: Gokarna Mandaladhishwara (Pontiff)

Location
- Location: Haniya, Ramachandrapura, Hosanagara taluk (headquarters); Ashoke, Gokarna, Uttara Kannada (origin Mūlamaṭha, 14°31′43″N 74°19′59″E)
- State: Karnataka
- Country: India
- Coordinates: 13°52′24″N 75°04′25″E

Architecture
- Founder: Adi Shankara (traditional)

Website
- srisamsthana.org

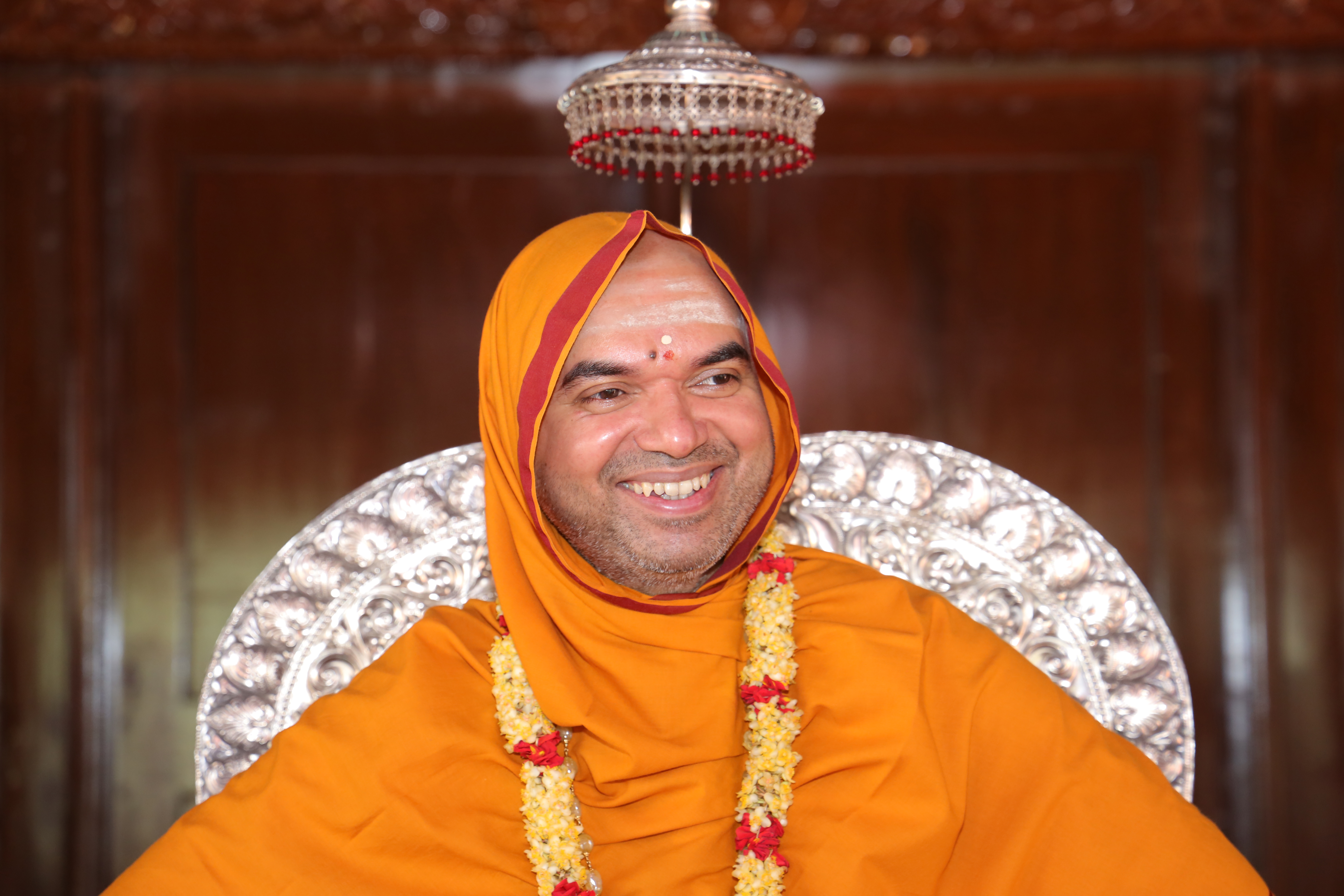
Raghaveshwara Bharathi, the 36th pontiff of the matha

Ramachandrapura Matha (also spelled Ramachandrapura Mutt or Ramachandrapura Math) is a Hindu monastery (matha) located on the left bank of the Sharavati river in Hosanagara taluk, Shimoga district, Karnataka, India. It is a monastic institution of the Advaita Vedanta tradition and functions primarily as the religious seat (gurupīṭha) of the Havyaka Brahmin community across Shimoga, Uttara Kannada, Dakshina Kannada, and Udupi districts in Karnataka, as well as Kasaragod district in Kerala and parts of Goa.

According to monastic tradition, Adi Shankara founded the institution at Asoka (Ashoke) near Gokarna as the Raghuttama Matha, placing his disciple Sureshvara's senior pupil Vidyanandacharya as its first head. During the Vijayanagara Empire and Keladi Nayaka periods, a branch established around 1500 CE by the twelfth pontiff, Ramachandra Bharati I, grew into the principal headquarters and absorbed the original Gokarna seat along with several regional sub-monasteries. The presiding monk is a celibate ascetic (sannyāsī) who bears the monastic surname Bharati. Since 1999, the 36th pontiff has been Raghaveshwara Bharathi.

== Origins and history ==
=== Traditional foundation at Gokarna ===
Traditional accounts and Sanskrit and Kannada texts such as Śrīgurukṛpā Taraṅgiṇī and Havyaka Gurupīṭham state that Adi Shankara visited Gokarna during his travels with his disciple Sureshvara and Sureshvara's pupil Vidyanandacharya. According to this tradition, Shankara met an ascetic named Varadamuni near the Varadeśaliṅga shrine. Varadamuni handed over six icons (ṣaḍvigraha), including idols of Tapōrāma (Rama in penance), Sita, and Lakshmana said to have been worshipped by the sage Agastya, so that their daily worship would continue without interruption. Shankara presented these icons, along with a crystal Chandramauḷīśvaraliṅga and his wooden sandals (pādukā), to Vidyanandacharya.

Shankara instructed Vidyanandacharya to establish a monastery at Asoka (Ashoke), on the Śataśṛṅga hill roughly 3 km (1.9 mi) from Gokarna, and to oversee the religious conduct (ācāra-vicāra) of the Haivadrāviḍa (Havyaka Brahmin) community in the Gōkarṇamaṇḍala region. Because its principal deity was Rama of the Raghu lineage, the monastery at Gokarna became known as the Raghūttama Maṭha (or Gōkarṇa Saṃsthāna). It was later moved from Asoka to the bank of the Kōṭitīrtha tank within Gokarna. In traditional āmnāya classification, the matha belongs to the Dakṣiṇāmnāya (southern tradition) under the Bhōgavardhana (Bhōgavāra) and Bhūrivāra lineages, from which its pontiffs take the monastic title Bhāratī (denoting Saraswati). While some traditional chronicles place the foundation in Śaka 635–640 (713–718 CE), historians note that this conflicts with the standard dating of Adi Shankara to 788–820 CE.

=== Vijayanagara patronage ===
Historical records of the matha become firmer during the Vijayanagara Empire in the 14th and 15th centuries. The earliest known stone inscription associated with the institution stands in front of the branch matha at Tirthahalli and is dated to Śaka 1311 (1389 CE). Another copper-plate charter from Śaka 1311 (1389 CE), attributed to Vidyaranya (the 12th pontiff of the Sringeri Sharada Peetham) in the presence of the deity Mahabaleshwara at Gokarna, records the presentation of ceremonial insignia to Chidbodha Bharati II, the ninth pontiff of the Gokarna Raghuttama Matha. The charter notes the shared lineage of Sringeri (through Sureshvara's second disciple, Nityabodhaghanacharya) and the Gokarna seat (through Sureshvara's senior disciple, Vidyanandacharya). It grants Chidbodha Bharati II the right to travel with royal and monastic emblems (including a throne or siṃhāsana, crown or kirīṭa, palanquin or āndōḷika, white umbrella or śvētachhatra, twin fly-whisks or ubhayachāmara, makaratōraṇa arch, daytime torches or hagalujyōti, yellow banner or pīta-piśaṅgavarṇapatāka, cymbals, conch, and discus) across four regions: Haiva (Uttara Kannada), Tuḷu, Maleyāḷa (Malabar), and Mūṣika.

During the tenure of the eleventh pontiff, Raghavesvara Bharati I (fl. 1464), a scholar of grammar, Vedanta, and Mimamsa who had studied in Kashi and brought back a thousand śāligrāma stones, the Vijayanagara emperor Deva Raya II (or his successor in Śaka 1386 / 1464 CE) visited Gokarna. According to a copper-plate grant, the emperor received blessings from Raghavesvara Bharati I and donated a palanquin, five golden finials (pañchakalaśa), and five ceremonial lamps (pañchadīvaṭika) to the matha.

=== Split and relocation to Ramachandrapura ===
Toward the end of the 15th century, differences arose between the senior pontiff, Raghavesvara Bharati I, and his junior successor, Ramachandra Bharati I. Ramachandra Bharati I left Gokarna and built a hermitage on the bank of the Sharavati river near Agastyatīrtha in present-day Hosanagara taluk. Around the same time, another disciple, Raghuttama Bharati, left Gokarna and founded a separate monastery at Kekkar in Honnavar taluk of Uttara Kannada.

Around 1500 CE, Chaudappa Nayaka (founder of the Keladi Nayaka dynasty) and Somanna Nayaka of Hampi met Ramachandra Bharati I. At the pontiff's direction, the chiefs built a settlement and monastery near Agastyatīrtha, endowing it with a village, an agrahara (Brahmin quarter), arecanut gardens, and paddy fields. Ramachandra Bharati I consecrated idols of Rama, Sita, and Lakshmana there; named after the deity Ramachandra and the pontiff, the settlement became known as Rāmachandrāpura. When Raghavesvara Bharati I fell ill at Gokarna, Ramachandra Bharati I returned to attend to him. Following the senior monk's death, Ramachandra Bharati I assumed administration of the Gokarna Raghuttama Matha, merged it with the new seat, and transferred the ancestral Tapōrāma idols, the Chandramauḷīśvaraliṅga, and Shankara's pādukā from Gokarna to Ramachandrapura.

=== Keladi Nayaka, Mysore, and colonial eras ===
Under the Keladi Nayaka rulers (16th to 18th centuries), the matha received land grants (umbaḷi and uttāra) that transformed it from a simple hermitage into a landed monastic estate (saṃsthāna or dharmasaṃsthāna). In 1565, during the reign of the 20th pontiff, Raghunatha Bharati I, a branch matha was established at Tirthahalli with 62 Havyaka Brahmin families placed under its supervision. Linganna Kavi's Kannada champū chronicle Keḷadinṛpavijayam (c. 1763) records that Shivappa Nayaka (r. 1645–1660) performed kālapuruṣadāna, tulāpuruṣadāna, and sahasragōdāna (gift of a thousand cows) to Brahmins at Tīrtharājapura (Tirthahalli) on the Tunga river, while Bhadrappa Nayaka (r. 1661–1663) donated land, elephants, horses, cows, silver, and garments there. The 16th-century pontiff Anantendra Bharati (16th in the lineage) founded another branch at Bidarakalu (Bidrakanu) in Siddapura taluk, while his successor Ramabhadra Bharati (17th pontiff) reconstructed the main monastery.

Following the fall of the Keladi kingdom to Hyder Ali in 1763, the matha maintained its status under Hyder Ali, Tipu Sultan, the Wodeyars of Mysore, and British colonial administrators. Archival passports (rahadārī) and royal orders (nirūpa) preserved in old Kannada, Sanskrit, and Persian at the matha document the privileges accorded to its travelling pontiffs. On 16 November 1814, Maharaja Krishnaraja Wadiyar III of Mysore issued a nirūpa to his amildārs and killedārs instructing them to welcome the 31st pontiff, Ramachandra Bharati III, with ceremonial music and to supply provisions for his retinue. Another nirūpa from Krishnaraja Wadiyar III ordered local officials to stop subordinate branch (thuṇḍu) mathas from usurping titles and insignia reserved for the main seat, directing branches such as Kekkar, Peraje, and Bhankuli to remit customary dues (kāṇike) to Ramachandrapura.

In 1824, the British sub-collector and magistrate of Canara, "Cameroon Saheb", issued a rahadārī ordering revenue officers across Mirjan, Gersoppa, Chandavara, Sonda, Bilgi, Barkur, and Malabar not to obstruct the 32nd pontiff, Raghavendra Bharati I, who travelled with an entourage of 100 Brahmins, 50 Shudras, 12 guards, three guns, three swords, a palanquin, two elephants, two camels, and ten horses. A similar order issued on 10 March 1836 by Assistant Captain Macleod under the Mysore administration recorded a tour into Uttara Kannada accompanied by 100 Brahmins, 60 Shudras, 10 horses, two camels, two elephants, two palanquins, seven guns, four swords (taḷawārs), and four spears (barchis).

=== Consolidation of branch mathas (19th century) ===
The Kekkar Matha, founded in the late 15th century by Raghuttama Bharati, had maintained a parallel lineage of 13 pontiffs. Its thirteenth and final head, Raghavesvara Bharati, resided at Ramachandrapura to manage the main seat's administration while the 31st pontiff, Ramachandra Bharati III (born at Hedali in Hosanagara taluk and initiated at age 12), was still a minor. When the Kekkar pontiff died in Śaka 1747 (1819 CE), no separate successor was appointed at Kekkar, and the Kekkar Matha merged permanently into Ramachandrapura Matha.

Further consolidation occurred under the 32nd pontiff, Raghavendra Bharati I, who was born into the Hosuramane family of Kekkar, took initiation at age 15, and studied Nyaya, Mimamsa, and the Śāstras in Kashi. During his tenure, four independent or semi-autonomous institutions merged with Ramachandrapura Matha: Komminakai (Kombinakai) Matha in Siddapura taluk, Rudrapada Matha at Kalasa in Chikmagalur district, and Krishnananda Matha of Amaragodlu and Hosalli Matha in Sagar taluk. In 1850–1851, Raghavendra Bharati I gave sannyāsa initiation to Amarendrapuri Swamiji of the Tirthahalli Matha; in 1858, Amarendrapuri handed over full administrative authority, reintegrating the Tirthahalli Matha into the Ramachandrapura seat.

=== 20th century to the present ===
The 33rd pontiff, Raghavesvara Bharati VII, entered sannyāsa at age 16, studied Nyaya, Yoga, and Uttara Mimamsa in Tirunelveli and Kanchipuram, and died at the Raghuttama Matha in Gokarna in Śaka 1831 (1901 CE). His disciple and successor, the 34th pontiff (initiated on 14 August 1898 at Kekkar and enthroned on 27 February 1949; referred to in matha records variously as Raghavesvara Bharati or Ramachandra Bharati), commissioned the matha's carved ivory throne (Dharmasiṃhāsana), which took local artisans over 18 years to complete.

The 35th pontiff, Raghavendra Bharati II (served 1953–1998), was born in Magalu village in Sagar taluk to the Ayurvedic physician Ganapati Bhat and Mukambika. After early Vedic studies in Tumari, Uppunda, Bhatkal, Thanjavur, Ayyampet, and Nanjangud, he studied literature, Tarka (logic), Mimamsa, and Vedanta in Kashi between 1946 and 1952. During his 45-year tenure, he oversaw more than 40 branch mathas, expanded Sanskrit pāṭhaśālās and secular schools, rebuilt the Peraje Matha in 1993, and authored the Sanskrit texts Stutimañjarī and Ātmavidyā Ākhyāyikā. On 21 February 1995, he met Bharathi Tirtha, pontiff of the Sringeri Sharada Peetham, at the Shankara Matha in Bengaluru in the presence of Vishwesha Teertha of the Pejawar Matha and Ganapathi Sachchidananda, marking the first formal meeting between the pontiffs of Ramachandrapura and Sringeri in 178 years. He died on 26 November 1998.

On 15 April 1994, Raghavendra Bharati II initiated Harish Sharma (born 25 July 1975 in Chaduravalli near Tumari, Sagar taluk, to Srinivas Bhat and Vijayalaxmi) into sannyāsa as Raghaveshwara Bharathi (Raghavesvara Bharati IX), who succeeded him as the 36th pontiff.

== Lineage of pontiffs ==
=== Main lineage (Guruparampare) ===
The matha traces an unbroken succession (avichchhinna paramparā) of 36 pontiffs from Vidyanandacharya to the present:

Pontiffs of the Gokarna Raghuttama and Ramachandrapura Matha
No.	Name	Seat	Notes / Attested dates
1	Vidyanandacharya	Gokarna (Asoka)	Senior disciple of Sureshvara; first head of Raghuttama Matha
2	Chidbodha Bharati I	Gokarna	Disciple of Vidyanandacharya
3	Nityananda Bharati	Gokarna	
4	Nityabodhaghanendra Bharati	Gokarna	
5	Satchidananda Bharati	Gokarna	
6	Chidghanendra Bharati	Gokarna	Also known as Raghuvirendra Bharati
7	Sitaramachandra Bharati	Gokarna	
8	[Unnamed / gap in early list]	Gokarna	Some lists count Adi Shankara and Sureshvara at the head, placing Chidbodha Bharati I as 4th and Chidbodha Bharati II as 9th
9	Chidbodha Bharati II	Gokarna	Contemporary of Vidyaranya; recipient of the 1389 CE copper-plate charter
10	[Transitional]	Gokarna	
11	Raghavesvara Bharati I	Gokarna	Last pontiff based solely at Gokarna; received grants from Deva Raya II (1464 CE)
12	Ramachandra Bharati I	Ramachandrapura	Founded Ramachandrapura Matha (c. 1500 CE) under Chaudappa Nayaka; merged Gokarna seat
13	Abhinava Raghavesvara Bharati	Ramachandrapura	Disciple of Ramachandra Bharati I
14	Ramayogindra Bharati	Ramachandrapura	
15	Narasimha Bharati	Ramachandrapura	
16	Anantendra Bharati	Ramachandrapura	Established branch matha at Bidarakalu (Siddapura taluk)
17	Ramabhadra Bharati	Ramachandrapura	Reconstructed the matha buildings
18	Raghavesvara Bharati II	Ramachandrapura	
19	Vidyadhanendra Bharati	Ramachandrapura	
20	Raghunatha Bharati (or Raghuttama Bharati I)	Ramachandrapura	Ascended seat in 1565 CE; Tirthahalli Matha founded during his tenure
21	Ramachandra Bharati II	Ramachandrapura	
22	Raghuttama Bharati II	Ramachandrapura	
23	Paramesvara Bharati	Ramachandrapura	
24	Raghavesvara Bharati III	Ramachandrapura	Also known as Venkatesvara Bharati
25	Raghuttama Bharati III	Ramachandrapura	
26	Raghavesvara Bharati IV	Ramachandrapura	
27	Raghuttama Bharati IV	Ramachandrapura	
28	Raghesvara Bharati (Raghavesvara V)	Ramachandrapura	
29	Raghuttama Bharati V	Ramachandrapura	
30	Raghavesvara Bharati VI	Ramachandrapura	
31	Ramachandra Bharati III	Ramachandrapura	Fl. 1814–1836; born in Hedali; Kekkar Matha merged during his rule (1819 CE)
32	Raghavendra Bharati I	Ramachandrapura	Born at Kekkar; merged Komminakai, Kalasa, Amaragodlu, Hosalli, and Tirthahalli (1858) mathas; samadhi at Melavarige
33	Raghavesvara Bharati VII	Ramachandrapura	Died in Śaka 1831 (1901 CE); samadhi at Gokarna
34	Raghavesvara Bharati VIII (Ramachandra Bharati IV)	Ramachandrapura	Initiated 14 August 1898; enthroned 1949; commissioned the Ivory Dharmasiṃhāsana; died at Kekkar
35	Raghavendra Bharati II	Ramachandrapura	Pontiff from 1953 to 26 November 1998
36	Raghaveshwara Bharathi (Raghavesvara Bharati IX)	Ramachandrapura	Initiated 15 April 1994; incumbent pontiff since 1998/1999

=== Kekkar Matha lineage ===
Before its merger with the main seat in 1819, the branch matha at Kekkar (Honnavar taluk) was headed by a separate line of 13 pontiffs:

1. Raghuttama Bharati I (disciple of Raghavesvara Bharati I of Gokarna)
2. Visvarupa Bharati
3. Satyarupa Bharati
4. Sarvesvara Bharati
5. Raghunatha Bharati I
6. Narasimha Bharati
7. Ramachandra Bharati I (whose disciple established the Nelemavu Matha in Siddapura taluk)
8. Raghuttama Bharati II
9. Raghavesvara Bharati I
10. Raghunatha Bharati II
11. Raghuttama Bharati III
12. Ramachandra Bharati II
13. Raghavesvara Bharati II (served as regent administrator at Ramachandrapura; died in Śaka 1747 / 1819 CE, ending the separate Kekkar succession)

== Administration and socio-religious practices ==
=== Historical administration ===
As land grants from the Vijayanagara and Keladi rulers expanded the matha's holdings into a dharmasaṃsthāna, an administrative hierarchy developed to manage its sarvamānya (tax-free) villages, arecanut and pepper gardens, and affiliated temples. Archival binnavattaḷes (petitions and reports), nirūpas (orders), and account books from the 18th to 20th centuries record the following offices:

- Subēdār: The chief executive officer of the Gōkarṇa Saṃsthāna, responsible for maintaining law and order within the matha's territorial jurisdiction and punishing offenders or insubordinate officials.
- Sarvādhikāri: The general superintendent who oversaw all movable and immovable properties, inspected village fields, collected dues in cash, areca, and pepper, stocked the matha's storehouses, paid workers' wages, and served as liaison between the pontiff and secular rulers.
- Pārupatyagāra: Stewards in charge of the day-to-day management (pārupatya) and rituals of individual temples and branch mathas.
- Killedār: A security officer who maintained order inside the matha premises, particularly during major festivals.
- Amildār and Maṇiyagāra: Revenue officers who collected rents and agricultural produce (arecanut and pepper) from sarvamānya villages and regional divisions (sīme), and checked the supply of manure and hedging materials in tenant gardens.
- Sēnubōva (Śyānubhōga): The accountant who maintained ledgers of land revenue, agricultural yields, devotee offerings, and commercial transactions.
- Rāyasadava (Rāyasiga): The scribe or courier who drafted and carried official correspondence (rāyasa) from the pontiff.
- Dharmādhikāri and Āsthāna Vidvānsa: Travelling religious judges, preachers (dharmaprachārakas), and court scholars who investigated social or ritual disputes (ācāra-vichāra) among disciples, prescribed expiatory rites (prāyaśchitta), and advised on scriptural law.

Under British rule and in post-independence India, the matha surrendered its civil and policing jurisdiction to the state government. Up to the early 20th century, the pontiffs also exercised the power of excommunication (bahiṣkāra) over disciples who violated caste rules or varṇāśramadharma, a practice that later fell out of use.

=== Community relations and education ===
Although the matha is primarily the monastic seat of the Havyaka Brahmins, its historical records show followers and service-holders from numerous communities across Malnad and coastal Karnataka. These include Rāmakṣatriyas (Kshatriyas in Kumta and Honnavar taluks), Vaishyas, Ammakodavas (Ammukodagas) in Kodagu, Bhovis, Ambigas (boatmen and fishermen), Harikantras, Gōmāntakas in Karwar and Goa, and Koḍiyas from Kumta and Siddapura who traditionally served as ceremonial umbrella-bearers during the pontiff's tours. Archival records also document financial loans and grants from the matha's treasury to poor families to fund weddings and Upanayana (sacred thread) ceremonies.

The matha runs traditional Vedic and Sanskrit schools (pāṭhaśālās), including the Savēda Sanskrita Pāṭhaśālā at Tirthahalli, the Śrī Rāghavēndra Bhāratī Sāmavēda Pāṭhaśālā at Mugva (Honnavar taluk), the Vidyāraṇya Sanskrita Pāṭhaśālā at Kekkar, and the Savēda Sanskrita Pāṭhaśālā at Halatakatte (Siddapura taluk). It has also supported secular educational institutions such as the Mahatma Gandhi Centenary College of Arts, Commerce and Science in Siddapura and the Lokaseva High School at Alike in Dakshina Kannada.

=== Deities, rituals, and festivals ===
Worship at the matha follows the Smarta pañchāyatana pūjā system attributed to Adi Shankara, which venerates five deities: Vishnu, Shiva, Durga (Śakti), Ganesha, and Surya. The principal tutelary deities of the matha are Rāmaparivāra (Rama, Sita, Lakshmana, and Hanuman) and the Chandramauḷīśvaraliṅga (a crystal sphāṭika liṅga). Other prominent objects of daily worship include Lakshmi Narasimha, Viṣṇu-Śāligrāma, Rajarajeshwari, the Śrīchakra, and, at the Tirthahalli branch, a Narasimhachakra yantra.

The pontiff performs daily dēvapūjā after morning bath and sandhyāvandana, fetching water from the Sharavati river to bathe the icons with panchamrita (milk, curd, ghee, honey, and sugar) followed by pure water, sandal paste (gandha), akṣata, tulasī leaves, flowers, and dūrvā grass, concluding with food offerings (naivedya), camphor arati, and distribution of tīrtha and prasada. On ceremonial occasions, the pontiff wears a pearl-studded tiara with a central emerald and travels in a crosswise palanquin (aḍḍa-pallakki) accompanied by a white umbrella and makaratōraṇa. Major annual observances recorded in matha manuscripts include Rama Navami (Rāmajayantī, featuring a car festival at Kekkar), Navaratri and Mahānavamī Utsava, Ganesh Chaturthi, Ananta Chaturdashi, Śatarudrābhiṣēka, and the four-month monsoon retreat (Chaturmasya) observed by the pontiff.

=== Titles of the pontiff ===
Inscriptions, sanads, and matha manuscripts record an elaborate string of Sanskrit and Kannada birudas (titles) borne by the pontiffs since the Vijayanagara era:

Śrīmat Paramahaṃsa-Parivrājakāchāryavarya, Padavākya-Pramāṇa Pārāvāra Pārīṇa, Yamaniyamāsana-Prāṇāyāma-Pratyāhāra-Dhyānadhāraṇa-Samādhyāṣṭāṅga-Yōgācharaṇa-Nirata, Tapaśchakravarti, Anādyavichchhinna-Guruparamparāprāpta, Sakala-Nigamāgama-Sārahridaya-Sāṅkhyatraya-Pratipādaka, Vaidikamārga-Pravartaka, Sarvatantra-Svatantra, Ādirājadhānī-Vidyānagara-Mahārājadhānī, Vaibhava-Siṃhāsanādhīśvara, Vyākhyāna-Siṃhāsanārūḍha, Śrīmadrājādhirāja-Guru, Gōkarṇa-Maṇḍalāchārya, Śrīmachchhataśṛṅga-Puravarādhīśvara, Śrīmachchharāvatī-Tīravāsa, Śrīrāmachandra-Pādapadmārādhaka.

== Architecture and branch mathas ==
=== Architectural features ===
The temples and monastic complexes of the Ramachandrapura Matha reflect a regional Malnad adaptation of Vijayanagara architecture and the Keladi Nayaka style, shaped by the heavy monsoon rains of the Western Ghats. While foundations and basements (adhiṣṭhāna), sanctums (garbhagriha), and pillars are carved from hard grey granite or schist, superstructures and walls make extensive use of locally abundant laterite blocks, wood, and lime mortar.

Characteristic architectural elements include:

- Plan and sanctum: Most complexes follow a west-facing rectangular layout built around a central shrine, enclosed on all four sides by two-storeyed tiled corridors housing the kitchen, storehouse (ugrāṇa), assembly hall (sabhā-bhavana), pāṭhaśālā, gurupīṭha, and guest quarters.
- Roofs and śikhara: To withstand torrential rainfall, hall roofs are built of flat or steeply sloping stone slabs with deep, S-shaped or slanted eaves (chhajja) grooved to prevent water seepage, while hall sides are enclosed by perforated stone screens or railings. Because sloping roofs could not bear heavy stone towers, the śikharas are relatively low, built of stone or brick and mortar, and occasionally incorporate Indo-Saracenic influences from the Keladi period such as dome-like profiles, trefoiled parapet discs, and slender corner minarets.
- Pillars and ceilings: Halls (navaraṅga and mukhamaṇṭapa) feature lathe-turned pillars with square bases, square pillars with octagonal shafts, or 16-sided columns terminating in puṣpabōdigai corbels and kumbha-pañjara motifs. Central ceilings (bhuvanēśvari) are carved with multi-petalled lotus medallions inside double-square frames.

=== Main complex at Hosanagara ===
The headquarters complex (Pradhāna Maṭha) at Ramachandrapura, near Haniya in Hosanagara taluk (13°52′24″N 75°04′25″E; 6 km (3.7 mi) from Hosanagara town), centres on a west-facing rectangular temple dedicated to Rāmaparivāra on the left bank of the Sharavati river. Its exterior comprises a plain five-moulded adhiṣṭhāna, a sloping kapōta cornice, and a two-tiered (dvitala) sloped śikhara crowned by a stūpi. The śikhara faces are decorated with stucco or stone figures of Vishnu (east), Yoga-Narasimha (west), Venugopala (south), and Lakshminarayana (north), while the neck (kaṇṭha) displays yāḷis, haṃsas, kubjagaṇas, dancers, conch-blowers, Kāḷiṅgamardhana, and Gōpikāvastrāpaharaṇa scenes. Inside, the garbhagriha is flanked by two side cells (pārśva garbhagriha) housing white marble statues of Gōvardhanagiridhāri (Venugopala) on the right and Adi Shankara on the left. The antarāḷa doorway has Vaishnava dvārapālakas and a lintel (lalāṭabimba) carved with Dhanalakṣmī and Gajalakṣmī. Surrounding the shrine is a sloped-roof residential and administrative quadrangle renovated in 1969, along with a modern gurubhavana.

Within the Hosanagara precincts stand three subsidiary structures:

- Māruti Maṇṭapa: A Keladi-style pavilion directly facing the main shrine, housing three Hanuman icons: one North Indian-style white marble image trampling a lion-faced rākṣasa and two post-Keladi black stone images standing in samabhaṅga with folded hands.
- Śāradāmbā Temple: An east-facing rectangular shrine with a garbhagriha, navaraṅga, and open mukhamaṇṭapa housing a four-armed white marble image of Sharadamba holding an amṛtakalaśa, lotus, rosary (akṣamālā), and book (pustaka). Unusually, its entrance is flanked by a Shaiva dvārapālaka on the right (holding triśūla and ḍamaru) and a Vaishnava dvārapālaka on the left (holding śaṅkha and chakra). Its outer walls feature low-relief carvings of a swan, a monkey holding a serpent, and a pair of fish with a tortoise.
- Śiva–Gaṇapati Twin Temple: A west-facing double shrine enclosed by a compound wall (prākāra) to the left of the Sharadamba temple, containing two single-celled sanctums without porches, one housing a four-armed standing Chaturbhuja Gaṇapati with a broken stone mouse (mūṣaka) outside, and the other housing a granite śivaliṅga fronted by a sculpted Nandi.

=== Notable branch mathas ===
By the late 20th century, the Ramachandrapura Matha administered approximately 40 branch mathas across Karnataka. The principal historic branches include:

- Mūlamaṭha at Ashoke and Raghūttama Maṭha (Gokarna): The original foundation site (Mūlamaṭha) is located at Ashoke (Asoka; 14°31′43″N 74°19′59″E), on the Śataśṛṅga hill about 3 km (1.9 mi) southeast of Gokarna in Kumta taluk, Uttara Kannada. The seat was subsequently shifted into Gokarna town to the left bank of the Kōṭitīrtha tank, where the historic Raghūttama Maṭha stands. The Kōṭitīrtha building is a small west-facing laterite structure comprising a garbhagriha, antarāḷa, and open maṇṭapa within a prākāra, enshrining standing Kōdaṇḍarāma, Sita, and Lakshmana icons, alongside samādhi shrines of early pontiffs.
- Tīrthahaḷḷi Maṭha: Situated on the left bank of the Tunga river in Tirthahalli (Shimoga district), this west-facing complex is built on a three-moulded granite temple basement (upāna, paṭṭikā, padma) surrounded by a two-storeyed tiled quadrangle. Its central Narasimha shrine has a five-moulded adhiṣṭhāna, a walled pradakṣiṇāpatha, a sloping chajja, and a three-tiered Keladi-style pañcharatha śikhara topped by a simhamukha capstone. The corridor features four composite corner pillars with simhayāḷi-on-elephant brackets and ten square-and-octagonal columns carved with reliefs of Yoga-Narasimha, Balakrishna, Kāḷiṅgamardhana, Durga, dancing Ganesha, Kūrma, Matsya, and Kōdaṇḍarāma. A stone brindavana with a niche sculpture of Venugopala stands in the right corner.
- Kekkār Maṭha (Raghūttama Maṭha): Located at Kekkar village, 20 km (12 mi) from Honnavar in Uttara Kannada, this west-facing rectangular complex is noted for its 12 carved wooden verandah pillars, wooden ceilings, interior Kāvi wall murals, a carved wooden temple chariot (ratha), and a stepped tank (puṣkaraṇī). Nearby at the Haḷēmaṭha (old matha) site stands a smaller laterite Lakshmi-Narasimha shrine roofed with early Mangalore tiles stamped by Albuquerque & Sons.
- Apsarakonda Maṭha: An east-facing sloped-roof shrine located 7 km (4.3 mi) from Honnavar on the coast, containing a garbhagriha consecrated to Narasimha, an antarāḷa with balustraded steps, Kāvi murals, and an exterior samādhi maṇṭapa.
- Perāje Maṭha: Located at Peraje (Mani), 16 km (9.9 mi) from Puttur in Dakshina Kannada, this west-facing complex houses Rāmaparivāra and Lakshmi-Narasimha in a sanctum built of horizontally piled stone blocks, surrounded by a sloped-roof quadrangle reconstructed in 1993.
- Bhānkuli Maṭha: A west-facing laterite temple complex at Bhankuli village in Siddapura taluk, enshrining Rāmaparivāra inside a sanctum and lotus-ceilinged antarāḷa flanked by front and rear residential corridors.
- Other branches: Additional affiliated mathas listed in monastic records include Kalasa (Rudrapada Matha), Kedige, Hosalli, Komminakai, Kodlekere, Chitrige, Thumbale, Dhene, Kogodu, Nelemavu, Uppunda, Mundahalli, Teppada, Kalasavalli, Vaddalli, Halasinakodlu, Balegadde, Kelagina Tenginakere, Makki, Kavadekeri, Hanaji, Mugure, Unchige, Hanavailu, Salkodu, Kondurugadde, Kalache, and Bidrakalu.

== Art and antiquities ==
=== Stone sculptures ===
The stone sculptures across the matha's temples are carved mainly in rough granite, schist, laterite, and greenish-grey trapstone in the Vijayanagara and Keladi idioms, supplemented by several later North Indian-style white marble figures.

- Shaiva sculptures: Stationary achala śivaliṅgas set on granite pāṇipīṭhas, memorial samādhi liṅgas of deceased pontiffs, seated Nandi bulls at Hosanagara, a four-armed standing Chaturbhuja Gaṇapati holding aṅkuśa, pāśa, broken tusk (bhagnadanta), and mōdakapātra at the Hosanagara twin temple, and a seated white marble image of Adi Shankara in padmāsana and bōdhamudrā.
- Vaishnava sculptures: Standing Kōdaṇḍarāma, Sita, and Lakshmana triads in samabhaṅga; a four-armed Lakṣmī-Narasimha seated in padmāsana with Lakshmi on his left thigh at the Kekkar Haḷēmaṭha and at Tirthahalli; a white marble Vēṇugōpāla lifting Mount Govardhana flanked by a cowherd, a gōpikā, and two cows at Hosanagara; a white marble Garuda seated in vīrāsana on a serpent at the entrance of Kekkar Matha; multiple Vīrāñjanēya and Sthānakamūrti Hanuman reliefs; and collections of ammonite śāligrāma stones.
- Shakta and Naga sculptures: The four-armed white marble Sharadamba at Hosanagara; Gajalakṣmī lintel panels showing elephants anointing the seated goddess; and serpent stones (nāgadēvatās) installed under sacred fig trees at Hosanagara and Kekkar.

=== Bronzes ===
The matha and its branches preserve a large collection of metallic icons, prabhāvaḷis (aureoles), ceremonial masks (mukhamaṇḍala), finials, and ritual vessels cast in panchaloha (five-metal alloy of copper, brass, gold, silver, and white lead), brass, and silver using the lost-wax technique (madhūchchhiṣṭa-vidhāna), dating from the pre-Vijayanagara, Vijayanagara, and Keladi periods through the 19th century.

- Shaiva bronzes: A Vijayanagara-era bronze of Adi Shankara seated on a tortoise pedestal (kūrmapīṭha) with daṇḍa and kamaṇḍalu beneath at Tirthahalli; a pre-Vijayanagara four-armed Nataraja trampling Apasmārapuruṣa at Bhankuli; a late Vijayanagara Umā-Mahēśvara at Tirthahalli; a folk-style Keladi-period four-armed Virabhadra holding bow, arrow, sword, and shield at Kekkar; a brass mukhamaṇḍala mask of Shiva with prominent moustache and vibhūti marks at Tirthahalli; and several Unmatta-Uchchhiṣṭa Gaṇapati bronzes at Hosanagara and Tirthahalli, including right-trunked (balamuri), left-trunked (eḍamuri), and a ten-armed Daśabhuja Gaṇapati with Shakti on his left lap.
- Vaishnava bronzes: The pre-Vijayanagara main altar group at Hosanagara depicting seated Paṭṭābhi-Rāma, Sita, and standing Lakshmana framed by a three-arched silver prabhāvaḷi inscribed with the Rāmamantra in Nāgarī script; a Keladi-period Harihara with a lace-like pañchalōha prabhāvaḷi supported by elephants, lions, and yāḷis at Tirthahalli; Vijayanagara-period bronzes of four-armed Vēṇugōpāla, Gōpālakṛṣṇa, and Yōga Lakṣmī-Narasimha at Kekkar; triad sets of Lakṣmī-Narasimha, Gōpālakṛṣṇa, and Lakṣmī-Nārāyaṇa at Hosanagara; and processional (utsavamūrti) sets of Vishnu with Bhudevi and Sridevi.
- Shakta bronzes and yantras: Engraved metallic Śrīchakra plates (in plane and pyramidal Mēru forms) at Hosanagara; the tantric Narasimhachakra at Tirthahalli; a Keladi-period five-faced, ten-armed Pañchamukhī Gāyatrī (Varadāmbā) flanked by two parrots and a small Nandi at Tirthahalli; pre-Vijayanagara and Keladi bronzes of four-armed Durga at Hosanagara and Kekkar; and an eight-armed Varahi seated on a śārdūla at Kekkar.

=== Paintings, wood carvings, and the Ivory Throne ===
- Kāvi murals: Because the heavy dampness of the Malnad climate destroys conventional frescoes, artists at the Kekkar, Apsarakonda, and Tirthahalli mathas used Kavi art, a coastal mural technique using Indian red ochre (kāvi), black, and white pigments on lime plaster, to depict deities, gandharvas, kinnaras, mythical birds, geometric motifs, and courtly retinues.
- Wood carvings and Ambāri: Local woodcarvers of the Gudigar community crafted ornate wooden temple chariots (rathas), pillars, and ceilings. Preserved in the front yard of the Hosanagara matha is a carved wooden elephant howdah or pavilion (ambāri maṇṭapa). Its upper panel depicts the coronation of Rama (Śrī Rāma Paṭṭābhiṣēka) attended by Sita, Lakshmana, Bharata, Shatrughna, Hanuman, Sugriva, Vibhishana, Jambavan, and the sage Vasishtha; its interior back panel shows the two-headed Gandabherunda bird, sages, and vanara musicians; its right interior panel depicts the eight-armed Mahishasuramardini slaying Mahishasura watched by Brahma, Vishnu, and Shiva; and its left interior panel portrays reclining Śēṣaśāyī Viṣṇu.
- Ivory Dharmasiṃhāsana: Commissioned during the reign of the 34th pontiff under the supervision of Hosabale Puttappa and his brothers, the matha's ceremonial throne was carved over 18 years by a team led by the master artisan Mudugodu Gudigara Hiranyappa. Standing approximately 9 ft (2.7 m) tall on a rosewood core, the throne has a square base supported by four carved lions whose eyes are inset with emeralds, an eight-sided pedestal, a semicircular prabhāvaḷi arch, and a silver-rodded white silk umbrella (śvētachhatra) fringed with pearls. Its exterior is overlaid with perforated ivory plaques backed by gold-plated metal sheets and accented with gold, silver, coral, pearls, and emeralds. The pedestal's 18 ivory plaques depict scenes and oval portraits from the Mahabharata (including the Chakravyūha, the Kaurava court, and the duel between Karna and Arjuna), while the 15 plaques on the prabhāvaḷi arch narrate the entire Ramayana and Uttara Rāmāyaṇa, from Rama's birth and marriage to the Ashvamedha sacrifice and Sita's final return to the earth.

== See also ==
- Raghaveshwara Bharathi
- Havyaka Brahmin
- Sringeri Sharada Peetham
- Gokarna, Karnataka
