= Aldhal, Raichur =

Aldhal
- Village
- Location within Karnataka Location within India
- Coordinates: 16°02′52″N 076°57′10″E
- Country: India
- State: Karnataka
- District: Raichur district
- Taluka: Manvi

Languages
  - Official: Kannada
- Time zone: UTC+5:30 (IST)
- PIN: 584123

Aldhal is a village in Raichur district in the southern state of Karnataka, India. Administratively, it is part of the Janekal gram panchayat in Manvi Taluka.
