= Ambaragudda =

Hill in India

Ambaragudda is a hill, covering 250 hectares (620 acres) located in Western Ghats village named "Marati" near Kodachadri in Sagara taluk, in the Indian state of Karnataka. It is covered with rainforests. Mining operations have drawn protests. The Karnataka government declared it as a natural heritage site of Western Ghat region in 2009.

Ambaragudda is a part of Sharavathi valley and is located near Linganamakki hydroelectric dam and the hill and Ammanaghatta hill range give birth to five tributaries of Sharavathi river.

== Mining ==
Mining is opposed by local people, including environmentalists such as Raghaveshwara Bharathi, in view of massive damage to surrounding hills. Local people stopped mining activity during 2005. It was alleged that the mining company furnished false information to the court, stating that the hill is barren, even though it is covered with forests. Certain mining companies undertook illegal mining in 2004. Local people formed a front named "Kodachadri Sanjeevini" to protest all mining activities in and around Ambaragudda and Kodachadri hill range.

== See also ==
- Kodachadri
- Raghaveshwara Bharathi
