= Wanadurga =

Wanadurga Wandurg, Vanadurga
- Village
- Location within Karnataka Location within India
- Coordinates: 16°38′03″N 076°41′54″E
- Country: India
- State: Karnataka
- District: Yadgir district
- Taluka: Shahapur

Government
  - Body: Gram panchayat

Population (2011)
  - Total: 4,849

Languages
  - Official: Kannada
- Time zone: UTC+5:30 (IST)
- ISO 3166 code: IN-KA
- Vehicle registration: KA
- Website: karnataka.gov.in

Wanadurga (Wandurg, Vanadurga) is a village in Shahapur taluka of Yadgir district in Karnataka state, India. Wanadurga is twelve kilometres by road west of Sagar, and four kilometres south-southwest of Hoskera. The nearest railhead is in Yadgir.

== Demographics ==
At the 2001 census, Wanadurga had 4,038 inhabitants, with 2,061 males and 1,977 females. By the 2011 census it had grown to 4.849 people, with 2,462 males and 2,387 females.
