= Gogikona =

- village
- Location in Karnataka, India Gogikona (India)
- Coordinates: 16°43′45″N 076°44′49″E
- Country: India
- State: Karnataka
- District: Yadgir
- Talukas: Shahapur

Government
  - Body: Gram panchayat

Population (2001)
  - Total: 7,046

Languages
  - Official: Kannada
- Time zone: UTC+5:30 (IST)
- ISO 3166 code: IN-KA
- Vehicle registration: KA
- Website: karnataka.gov.in

Gogikona is a village in the southern state of Karnataka, India. It is located in the Shahapur taluka of Yadgir district in Karnataka. Gogikona is a companion village to Gogipeth which lies less than half a kilometre to the northwest, across a small stream, and together the two are often known as "Gogi".

== Demographics ==
As of 2001 India census, Gogikona had a population of 7,046 with 3,552 males and 3,494 females.

== See also ==
- Yadgir
