= Kodachadri =

Mountain peak in South India

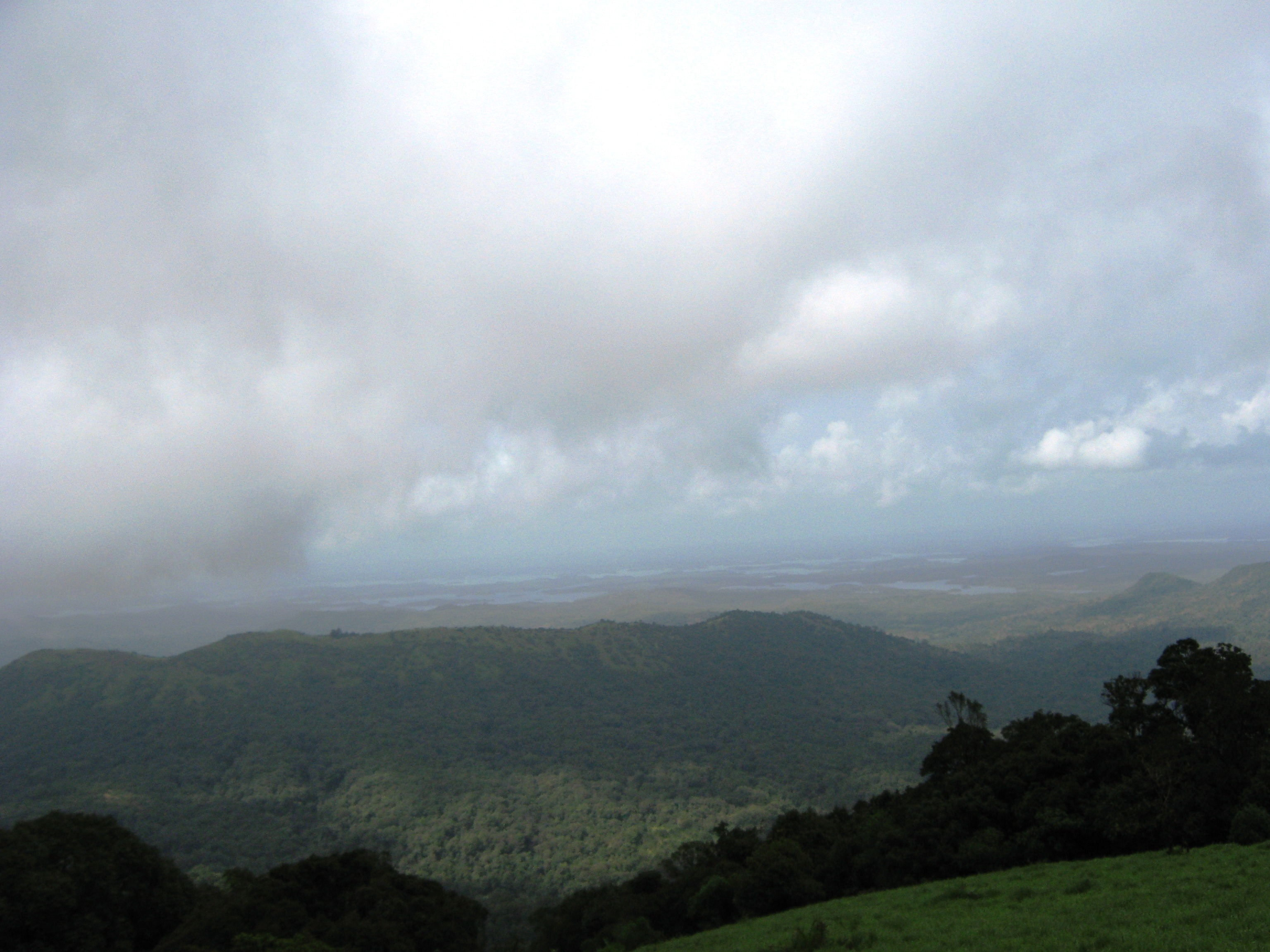
- Western Ghats and backwaters of Sharavati as seen from Kodachadri Hills

Highest point
- Elevation: 1,343 m (4,406 ft)
- Coordinates: 13°51′39″N 74°52′29″E

Geography
- Location within Karnataka
- Location: Border of Sagara, Karnataka taluk Hosanagara Taluk, Shimoga District and Byndoor Taluk Udupi district, Karnataka, India
- Parent range: Western Ghats

Climbing
- First ascent: Historic times
- Easiest route: via Nagodi

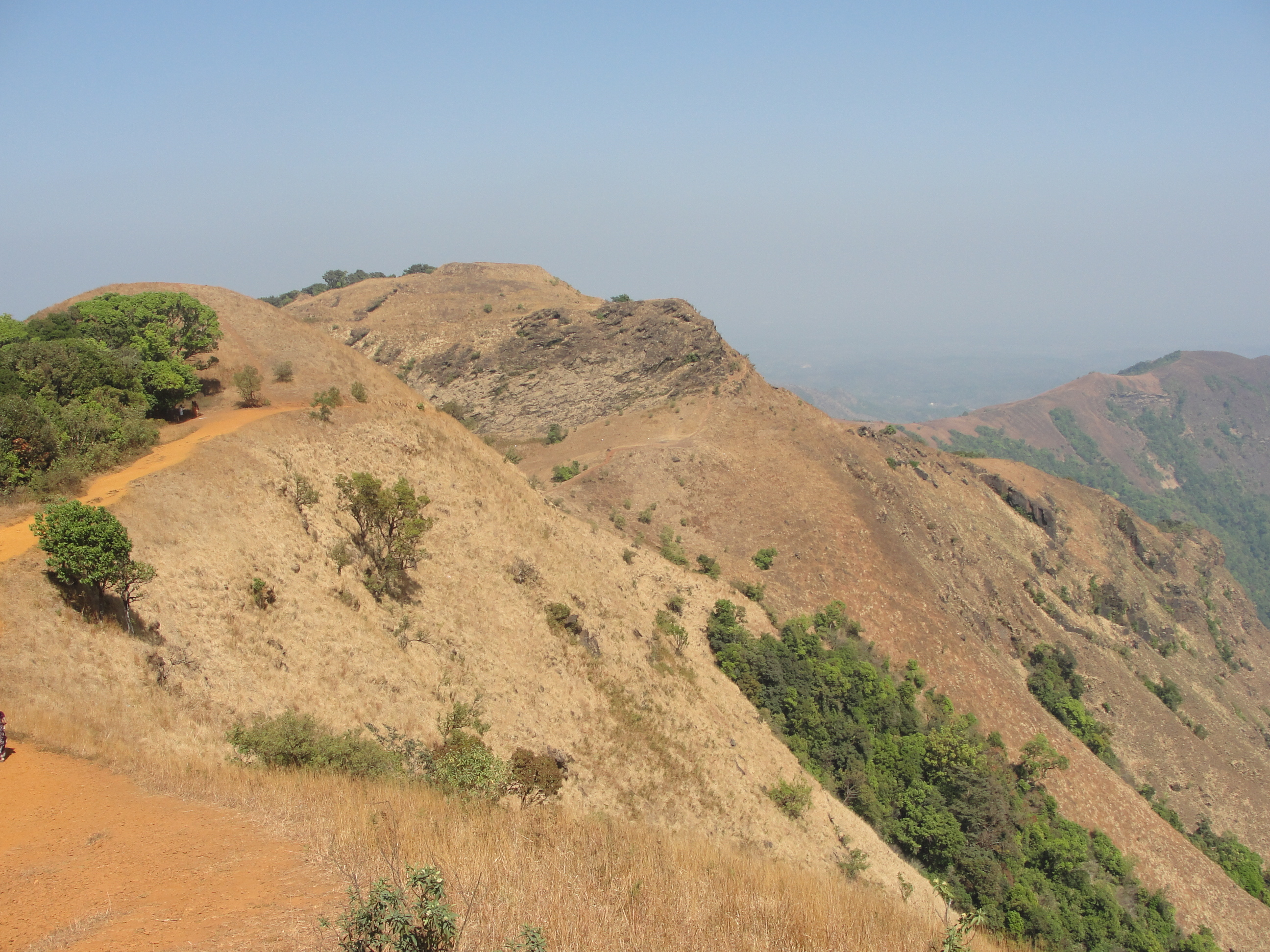
Path leading to Sarvajna Peeta, Kodachadri, India

Kodachadri is a mountain peak with dense forests (elevation - 1,343 metres above sea level) in the Western Ghats in South India (Shivamogga District, Karnataka), 78 km from Shimoga. Kodachadri is the highest peak in Shivamogga district. It is declared as natural heritage site by the Karnataka Government. and it is 13th highest peak of Karnataka.

== Etymology ==
The name comes from native word "Kodacha" or "Kodashi", which means Kutaja flowers, and "Adri", a Sanskrit word for mountain, both combined to coin the word Kodachadri. "Kuţaja" in Sanskrit means Girimallika or Jasmine of the hill (Wrightia antidysenterica). The hilly region that is full of "Jasmine of the hills" plants is "Kutajagiri". It is also called "Kutachadri" and "Kodashi Parvatha".

== Location ==
Kodachadri forms a background to the temple of Mookambika in Kollur. It is located at a distance of 21 km from Kollur and 15 km from Nagodi village, in Hosanagara taluk. 78 km and 42 km from Sagara, Karnataka via Hasirumakki Ferry from District Headquarters Shimoga and there are different routes to reach the Peak of Kodachadri and the difficulty varies highly with respect to the route chosen. However, it is challenging to reach the peak in monsoon due to heavy rains that make the routes slippery. Kodachadri receives an annual rain fall of 500 cm to 750 cm and it rains for about eight months in a year.

== Flora and fauna ==
Situated in the middle of the Mookambika National Park and considered as a biodiversity hotspot, it is home to several endemic and endangered species of flora and fauna. The peak is barren due to strong winds and the thick forest cover at the base makes the peak invisible from lower ground level and also several other smaller peaks and hills exist around the peak. The important animal life include Malabar langur, Malabar pied hornbill, Malabar grey hornbill, paradise flycatcher, Indian tiger, Indian leopard, Indian elephant, dhole, gaur, Indian rock python and many more, of which several are threatened.

== History ==
Kodachadri seems to have attracted the attention of humankind since early prehistory. Several monolithic structures or menhirs were built here in prehistoric times. Rocks with dimensions greater than 12 feet were used in their construction. These large structure can be found just 20 Kilometers outside of Nagara-Nilsakal. A temple dedicated to the Ancient Mother Goddess Mookambika is located near the top of the peak. The temple is a popular destination for Hindu pilgrims and it is said to stand where thousands of years ago Mookambika fought and killed the demon Mookasura. In Historic times, people used to trek from Nagara state, a nearby place and Europeans trekked to the peak during the 19th century. Lewin Bentham Bowring, who served as Commissioner of Mysore between 1862 and 1870, records that Kodachadri is "clothed with splendid forests, and the ascent is very steep indeed in one place near foot....The view from the top of the hill, which has a bluff appearance from the distance, though it is as sharp as a knife in reality, is very fine, commanding a long stretch of great Ghat range, a considerable portion of Canara (Kanara), and a wide view over Malnad". He further records that, Kodachadri is visible from Merti Peak near Sringeri.

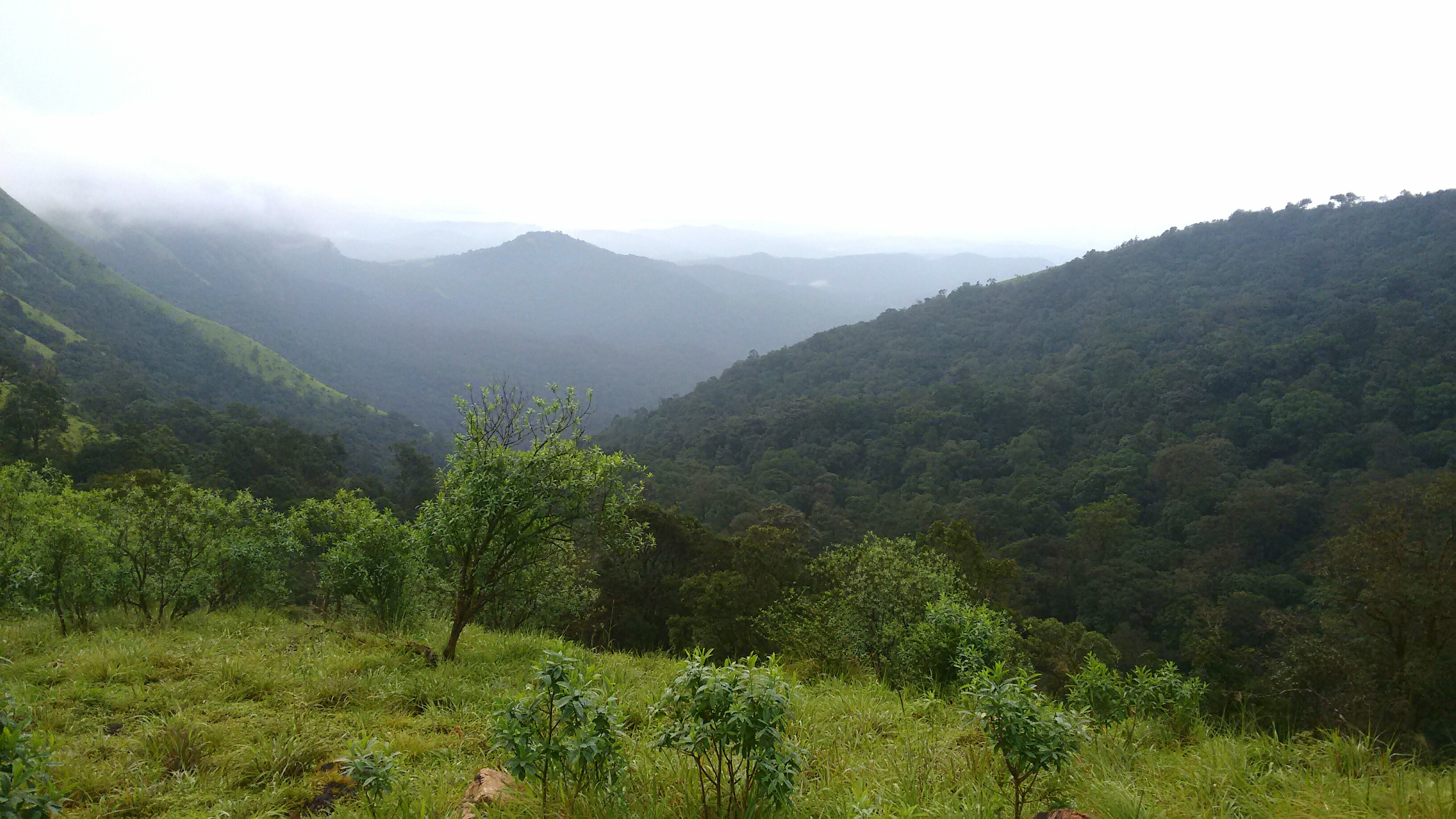
Kodachadri hills seen from the top of the mountain near to Inspector bungalow

Kodachadri is visited by locals and Keralites in large numbers since long time. Sage Adi Shankara is said to have visited this place, meditated here and he also established a temple at Kollur. A small temple called Sarvajnapeetha, built with stone is dedicated to Adi Shankara at the top of Kodachadri. Some of the pilgrims from South Indian states who visit Kollur take a trek to Kodachadri also. Dr. K. Shivarama Karantha, a writer of the Udupi District, trekked to Kodachadri in the 1940s and appreciated the natural environment of this place by placing Kodachadri as most beautiful of three mountain peaks of coastal Karnataka (the other two being Kuduremukh and Kumara Parvata).

== Forests ==
The Shola Forests and thick forest cover Kodachadri and the nearby hills and the place has a cool climate. The forest of Kodachadri and nearby hills is tropical rain forest seen along with Western Ghats, a World Heritage Site.

== Iron ore ==
Kodachadri hill contains iron ore in its soil and test digging was also done here during the 20th century and it was identified that the stones found here have magnetic properties. However commercial mining in large scale did not take place at Kodachadri, though there are efforts to lease out the surrounding hills to mining companies to mine manganese and iron and local people have strongly opposed such a move in view of possible environmental damage. In such anti-mining protests, local people under the leadership of Shri Raghaveshwara Bharathi of Ramachandrapura Mutt, Shivamogga district and environmentalist Ananth Hegde Ashisara demanded ban on all mining activities in Ambaragudda, which is near Kodachadri and other hills of the area.

== Places of interest ==
=== Sarvajna peetha ===
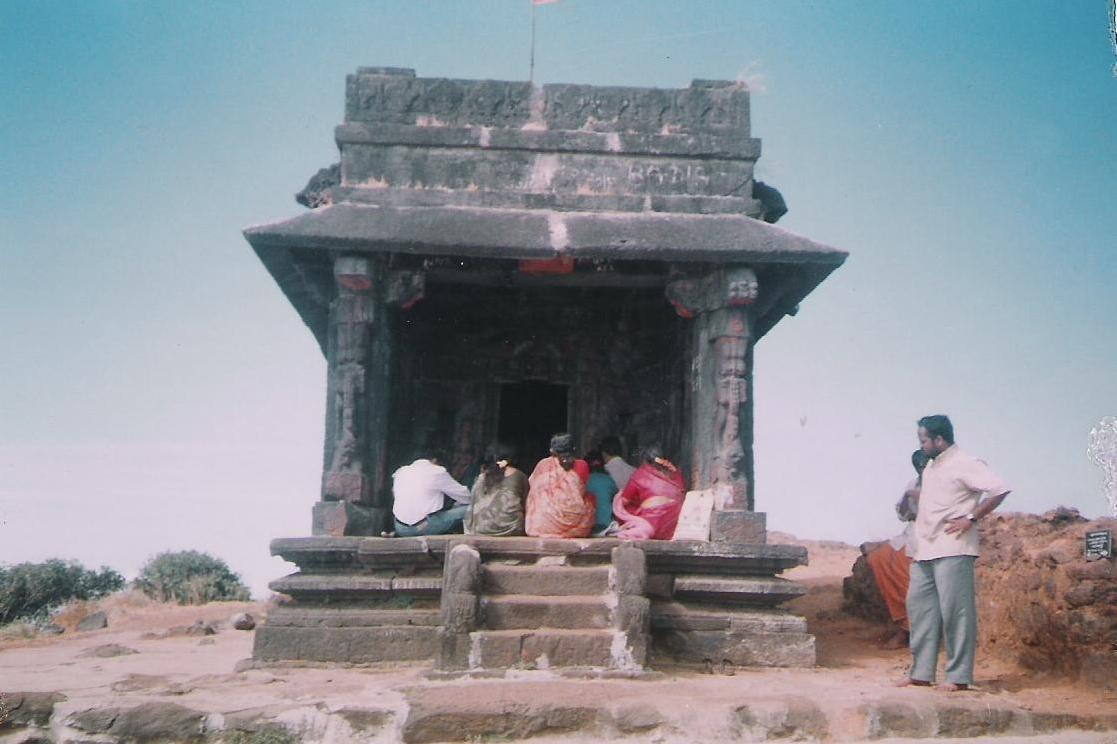
Front view of Mantapa or Sarvajnapeetha at Kodachadri

Sarvajna Peeth is a small temple like structure near the peak where Adi Shankara meditated. This small structure bears a name which is similar to Sarvajñapīṭha, also called Sharada Peeth of Jammu and Kashmir. which was visited by Adi Shankara during his long spiritual journey, where he defeated other scholars in philosophical debate and opened the southern door of the temple. Another temple is located near travellers' bungalow and is believed to be the moola sthana (the origin) of Sri Mookambika Devi. From this spot, it is a 2 km trek to the peak. Just below the peak, an almost vertical path leads to a small cave called Chitramoola, from where the Mookambika temple of Kollur, is visible. The path to Chitramoola has been closed by forest officials citing various reasons. As of now a pilgrim can go only up to Sarvajnapita.

=== Ganesha Guha ===
Ganesha Guha is near the trekking path to Sarvajna peetha.

=== Iron Pillar ===
One iron pillar of about 40 feet length is planted erect in front of Moola Mookambika Temple near peak of Kodachadri and it is compared with massive similar historic iron pillars located at Dhar, Mount Abu etc. Devotees believe that this is the trishula used by goddess Mookambika to slay a demon called Mookasura as per local tradition. Indian scientists from IGCAR Kalpakkam and KREC(Now NITK), Suratkal, Mangalore conducted a test on the iron pillar and found that it was made from traditional Indian metallurgical skills and not from modern casting methods. It is found made of pure iron. It is also found to be less affected by corrosion, despite humid conditions prevailing there due to heavy rains. This iron pillar is considered as testimony of ancient Indian iron craftmanship.

=== Hidlumane Falls ===
Around 5 km from Kodachadri is Hidlumane Waterfalls and it can be reached by trekking on a bridle path.

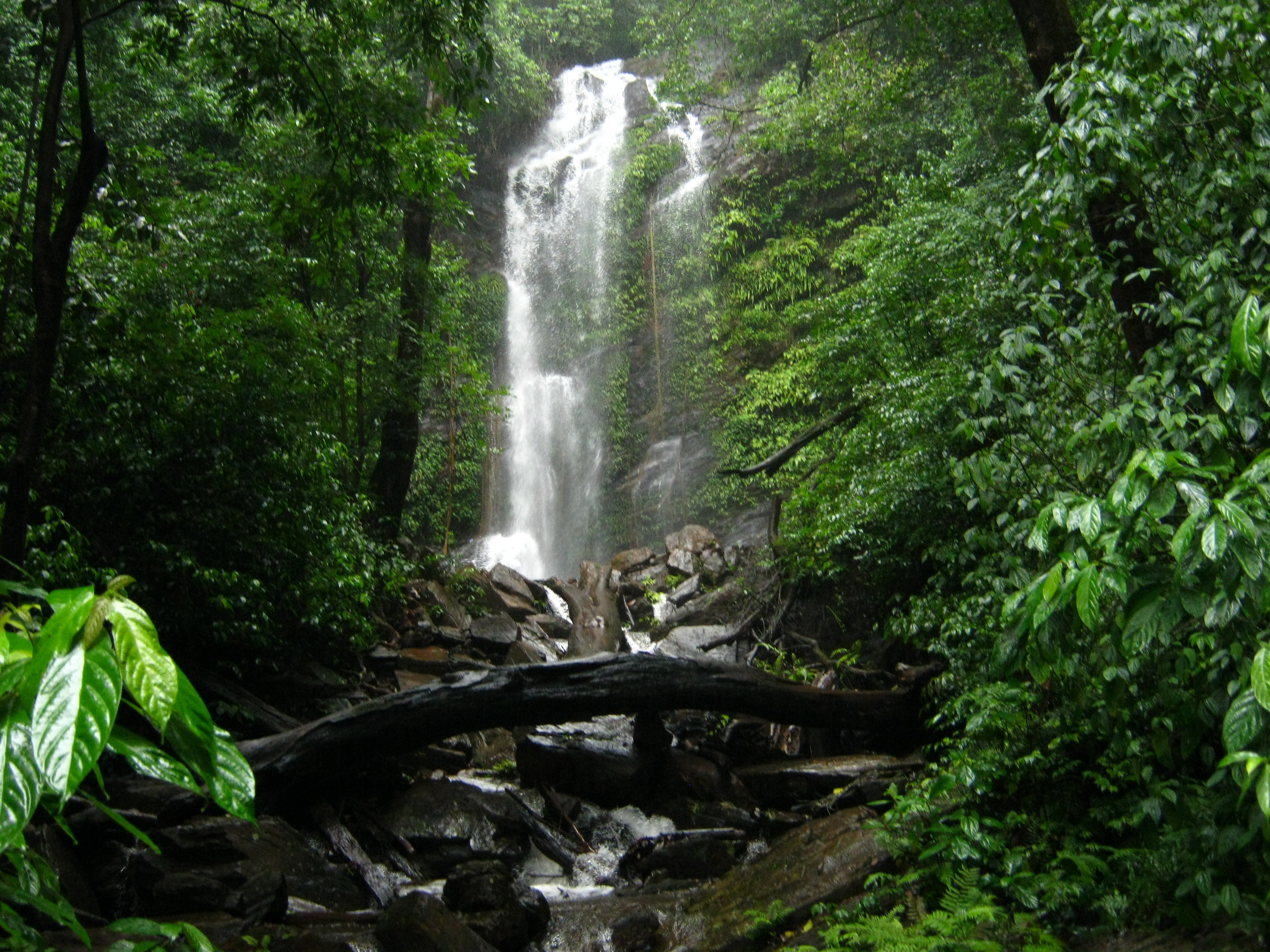
The Hidlumane Falls

.

=== Arasinagundi falls ===
Another water falls in deep forest is Arasinagundi falls which 6 km from Kollur, at the bottom of Kodachadri near Dhalli village.

=== Belakallu theertha ===
One more waterfalls called Belakallu theertha is located near Mudur, Jadkal (and 15 km from Kollur) and at the bottom of Kodachadri on southern side and involves easy trekking to reach.

=== Nagara fort ===
Nagara Fort is around 25 km from Kodachadri where an old fort built during the 18th century is located and the landscape created out of backwaters of Linganamakki Dam on Sharavathi River surrounds Nagara town.

== Trekking in Kodachadri ==
Trekking to Kodachadri peak starts from Nagodi village or Nittur, Shivamogga village which are located at the base of Kodachadri. Tented overnight Camping and Camp fire is strictly not allowed since January 2015, Once you enter the check Post in the foothill as this comes under the Forest Department, Govt. of Karnataka (Liquor will be detained at the Check Post).

Difficulty level	Moderate to Difficult
Approx Temperature	30 degree
Washrooms	Toilets Only at Base Camp. Hotwater etc., as Per Availability.
Distance from Bangalore	380 km (one way)
Total trekking distance	Approximately 20 – 22 km
Attraction	Beautiful landscape, Hidlumane Waterfall.

== Transportation ==
From Bangalore, one has to go to Shivamogga (285 km) and from there, one can take public transport to reach Nagodi village (Hosanagara Taluk). From Udupi, it is three hours journey to Nagodi village, from where trekking starts.

Kodachadri peak is connected with an all rough jeep road (partially metalled) on which only jeeps can travel. As this hilly road is not maintained properly, only expert local jeep drivers can take the jeep to the top. Jeeps are available for hire at Kollur and at Kattinahole village near Kodachadri base. Motorcycle riding on this highly uneven, steep, mud track with sharp hairpin curves with gradients, may be challenging and risky. However, Government departments have commenced construction of a quality road to top, after a stay (by private tourist operators) opposing construction of road is vacated(during 2011) and this proposed work includes overall development of Kodachadri area. Kundapur and Byndoor are the nearest major railway stations which is in Mangalore–Mumbai Konkan Railway route.

== See also ==
- Mangalore
- Udupi
- Maravanthe
- Kollur
- St. Mary's Islands
- Mullayana Giri
- Baba Budan giri
- Brahmagiri
- Pushpagiri

== Gallery ==
Photos related to Kodachadri

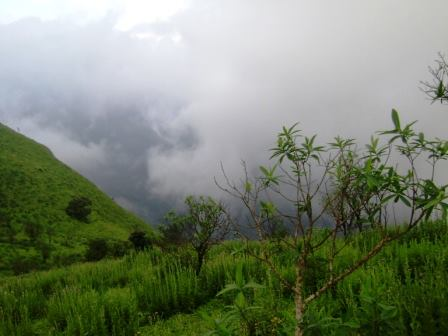
Kudachadri - scene1

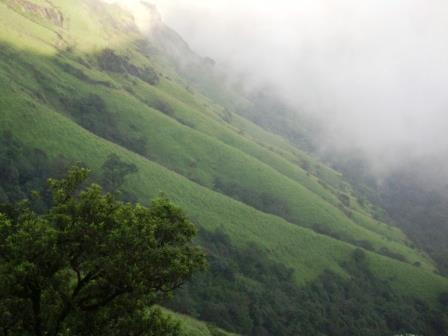
Kudachadri - scene2

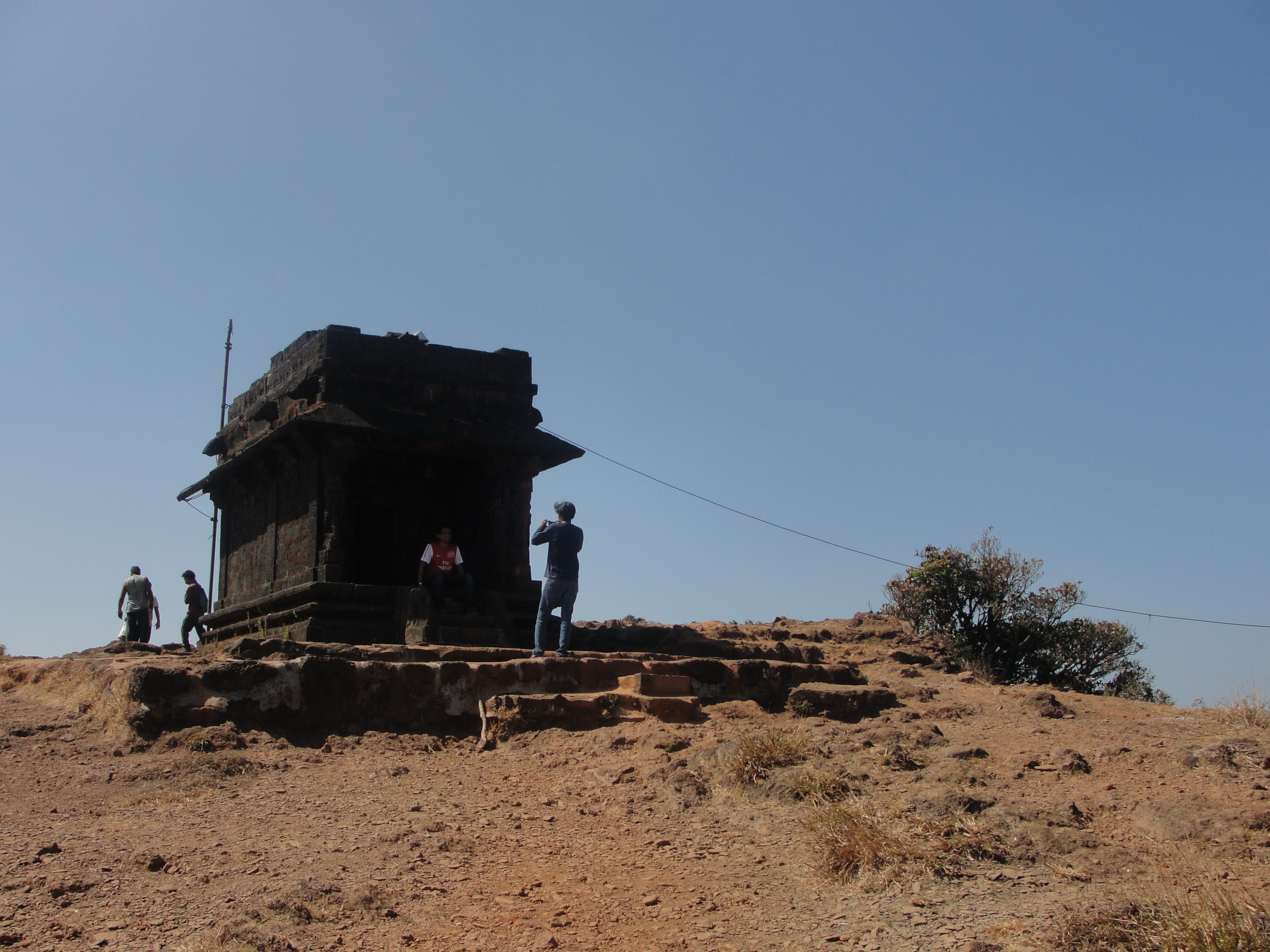
Sarvajna peeta at the peak of Kodachadri,western view

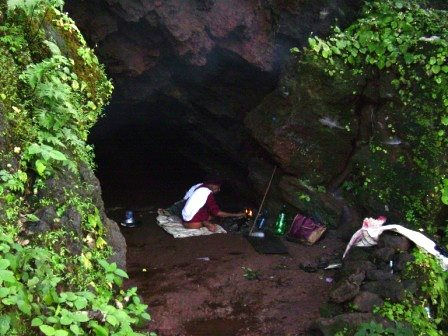
Kudachadri GaneshaGuha

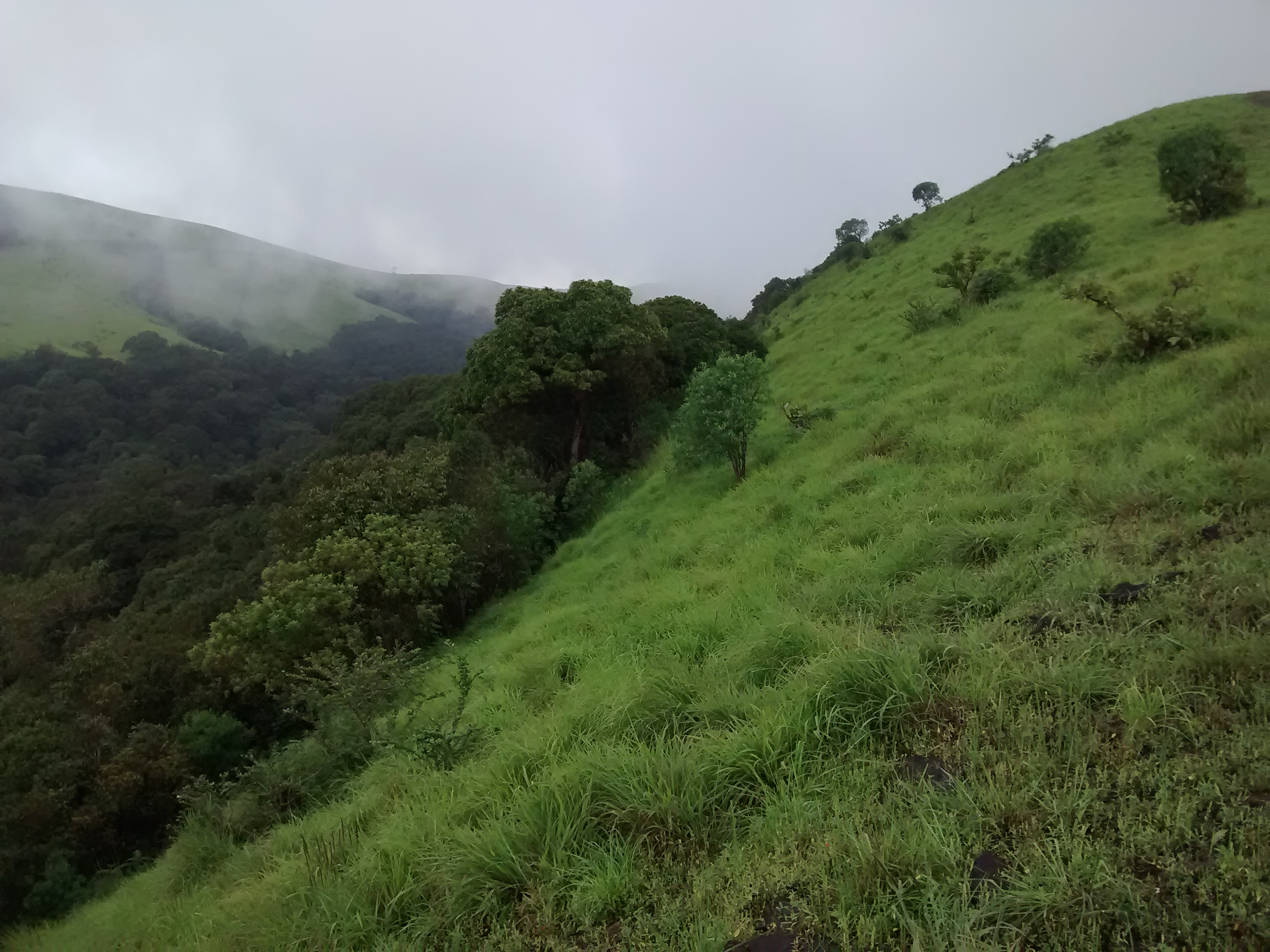
On top of the Kodachadri mountains.

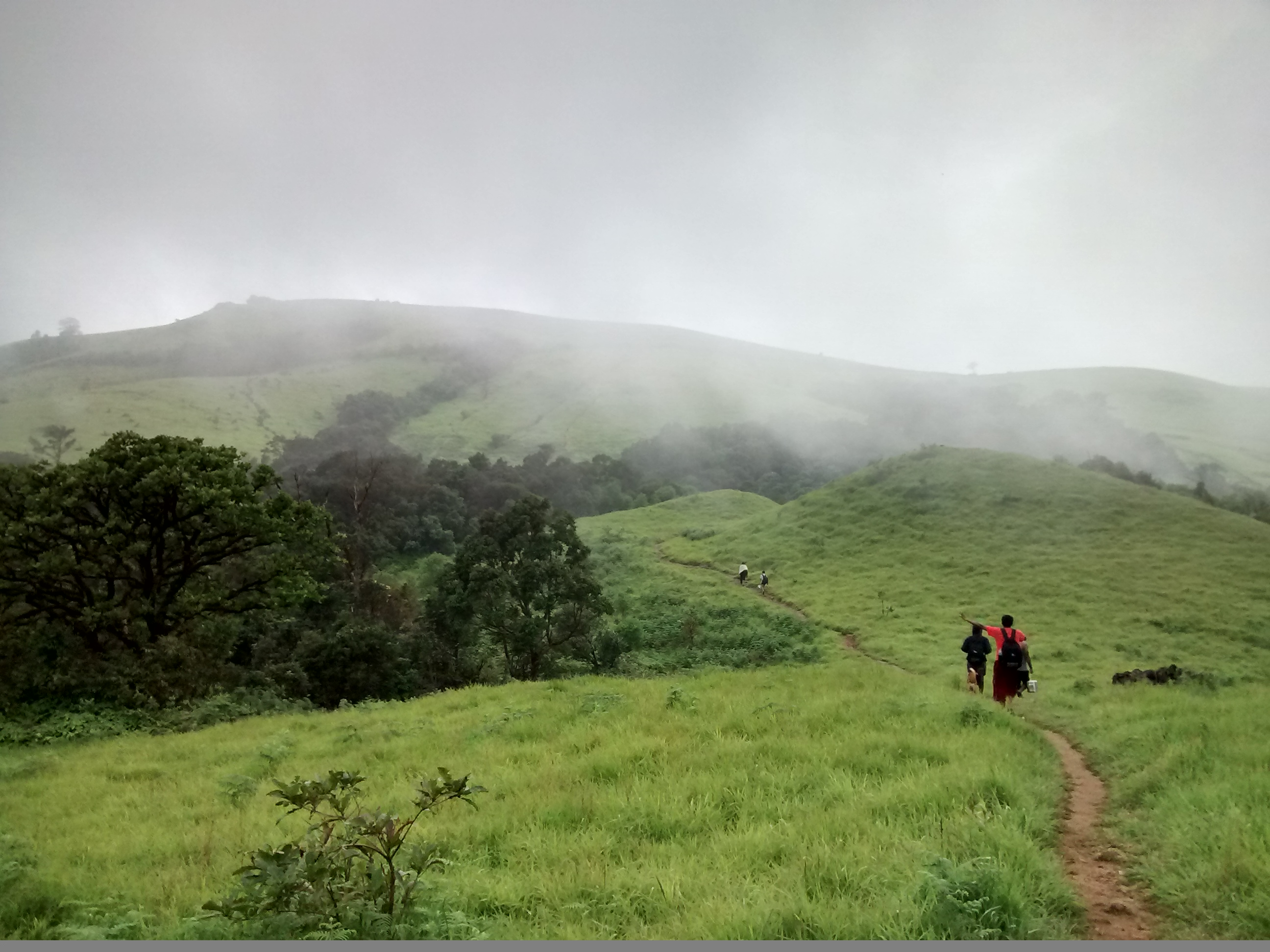
Trekking trail on top of the mountain

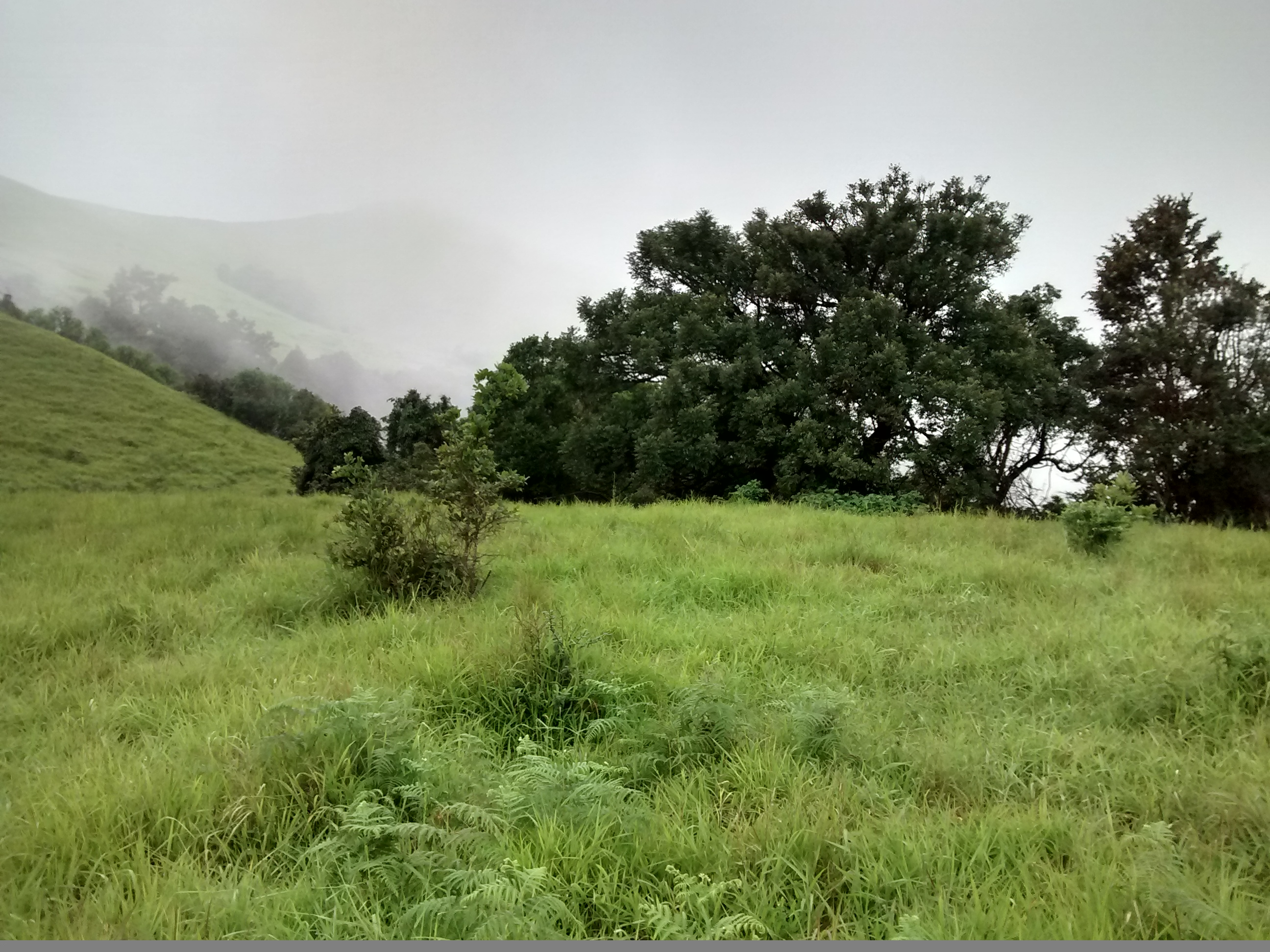
Kodachadri landscape

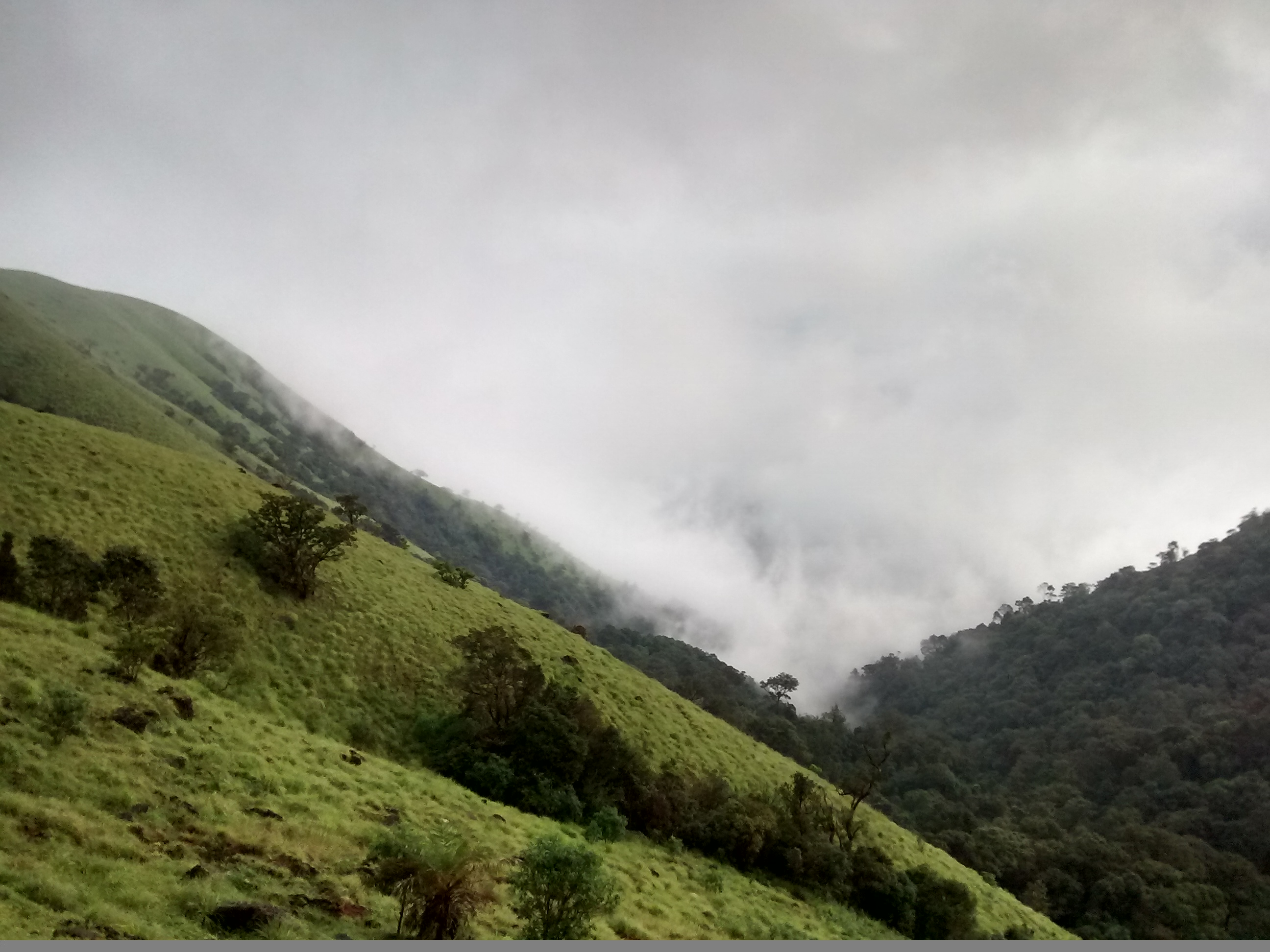
Hills seen from top of the mountain
