= Gundgurthi, Wadgera =

Gundgurthi Wadgera
- Village
- Location within Karnataka Location within India
- Coordinates: 16°39′38″N 076°56′39″E
- Country: India
- State: Karnataka
- District: Yadgir district
- Taluka: Wadgera

Government
  - Type: Panchayati raj (India)
  - Body: Gram panchayat

Population (2001)
  - Total: 1,448

Languages
  - Official: Kannada
- Time zone: UTC+5:30 (IST)
- PIN: 585319
- ISO 3166 code: IN-KA
- Vehicle registration: KA 33
- Website: karnataka.gov.in

Gundgurthi is a gram panchayat village in the southern state of Karnataka, India. Administratively, Gundgurthi is under Wadgera Taluka of Yadgir district in Karnataka. Gundgurthi is nine kilometers by road northeast of Hattigudur. The nearest railhead is in Yadgir.

== Demographics ==
As of 2001 census, Gundgurthi had 1,448 inhabitants, with 715 males and 733 females.
