= Hattigudur =

- Village
- Location within Karnataka Location within India
- Coordinates: 16°36′08″N 076°52′54″E
- Country: India
- State: Karnataka
- District: Yadgir district
- Taluka: Shahapur

Government
  - Type: Panchayati raj (India)
  - Body: Gram panchayat

Population (2001)
  - Total: 2,356

Languages
  - Official: Kannada
- Time zone: UTC+5:30 (IST)
- ISO 3166 code: IN-KA
- Vehicle registration: KA
- Website: karnataka.gov.in

Hattigudur is a panchayat village in the southern state of Karnataka, India. Administratively, Hattigudur is under Shahapur taluka of Yadgir district in Karnataka. Hattigudur is 12 km by road south of the town of Shahapur and 9 km by road southwest of Gundgurthi. The nearest railhead is in Yadgir.

== Demographics ==
As of 2001 census, Hattigudur had 2,356 inhabitants, with 1,169 males and 1,187 females.
