= Sagar, Yadgir =

Village in Shahpur Taluk YADGIR DISTRICT Karnataka, India

Sagar Nusratabad
- Village
- Nickname: Bada Sagar
- Location within Karnataka Location within India
- Coordinates: 16°37′28″N 076°48′03″E
- Country: India
- State: Karnataka
- District: Yadgir district
- Taluka: Shahapur

Languages
  - Official: Kannada
- Time zone: UTC+5:30 (IST)
- PIN: 585323
- Telephone code: 08479

Sagar is a historical village. It's also called Nusrat Abad.

Sagar is a village in the Shahapur taluk of Yadgir district in Karnataka state, India. Sagar is ten kilometres south-southwest (SSW) of the town of Shahapur and 6 km from the Shahapur-Bangalore highway. Sagar is specifically known as Dodda Sagar to differentiate it from Halisagar (the village near by Shahapur city). The nearest railhead is in Yadgir.

== Demographics ==
At the 2001 census of India, Sagar had 10,515 inhabitants, with 5,303 males and 5,212 females.

== Notes ==
Sagar is famous place due the shrine of Hazrat Sofia Sarmast Warahmatullah.

There's historical well beside the shrine who water is used to cure ailments.

Noorani masjid sagar shreef. A historical mosque near the dargah.

Kannada is the major language spoken. Urdu is also used.

Schools. 1. Karnataka public school

2. Government Urdu High school sagar.

Famous educationist, urdu poet MUSHTAQUE AHMED SAQI

(مشتاق احمد وافی سابق ساقی)

worked in GOVERNMENT URDU HIGH SCHOOL SAGAR FOR 6 YEARS as incharge Head Master.
