= Shahapur, Karnataka =

Shahapur (Shahpur)
- City
- Shahapur Taluk Map before creation of Wadgera Taluk

- Location in Karnataka, India
- Coordinates: 16.7°N 76.83°E
- Country: India
- State: Karnataka
- District: Yadagiri
- Lok Sabha Constituency: Raichur
- Elevation: 428 m (1,404 ft)

Population (2011)
  - Total: 53,366

Languages
  - Official: ಕನ್ನಡ 2nd most speaking (Urdu) (اردو)]
- Time zone: UTC+5:30 (IST)
- PIN: 585223
- Telephone code: 08479
- Vehicle registration: KA 33
- Website: www.shahapuracity.mrc.gov.in

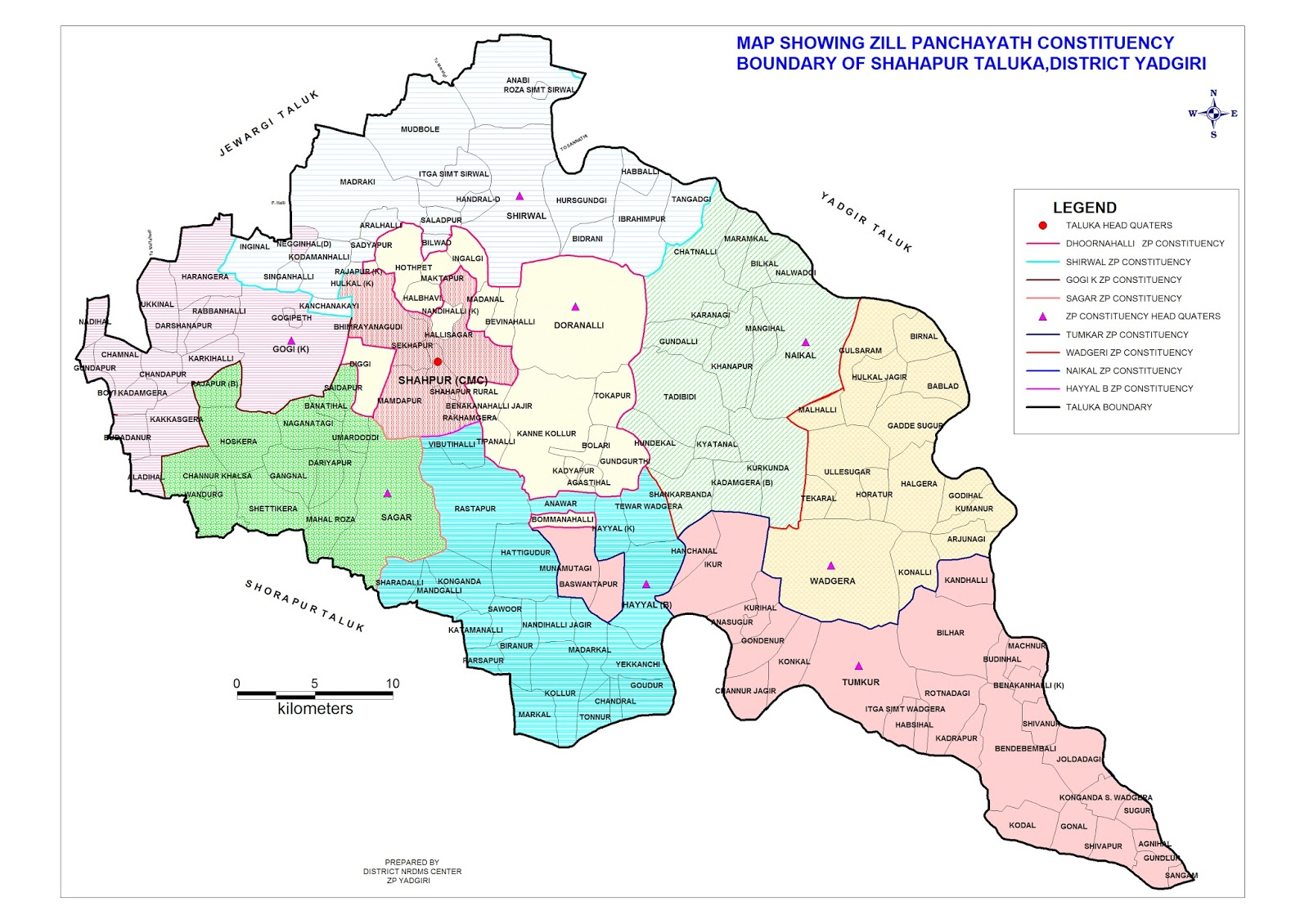
Shahapur Taluk Zilla Panchayat Map before creation of Wadgera Taluk

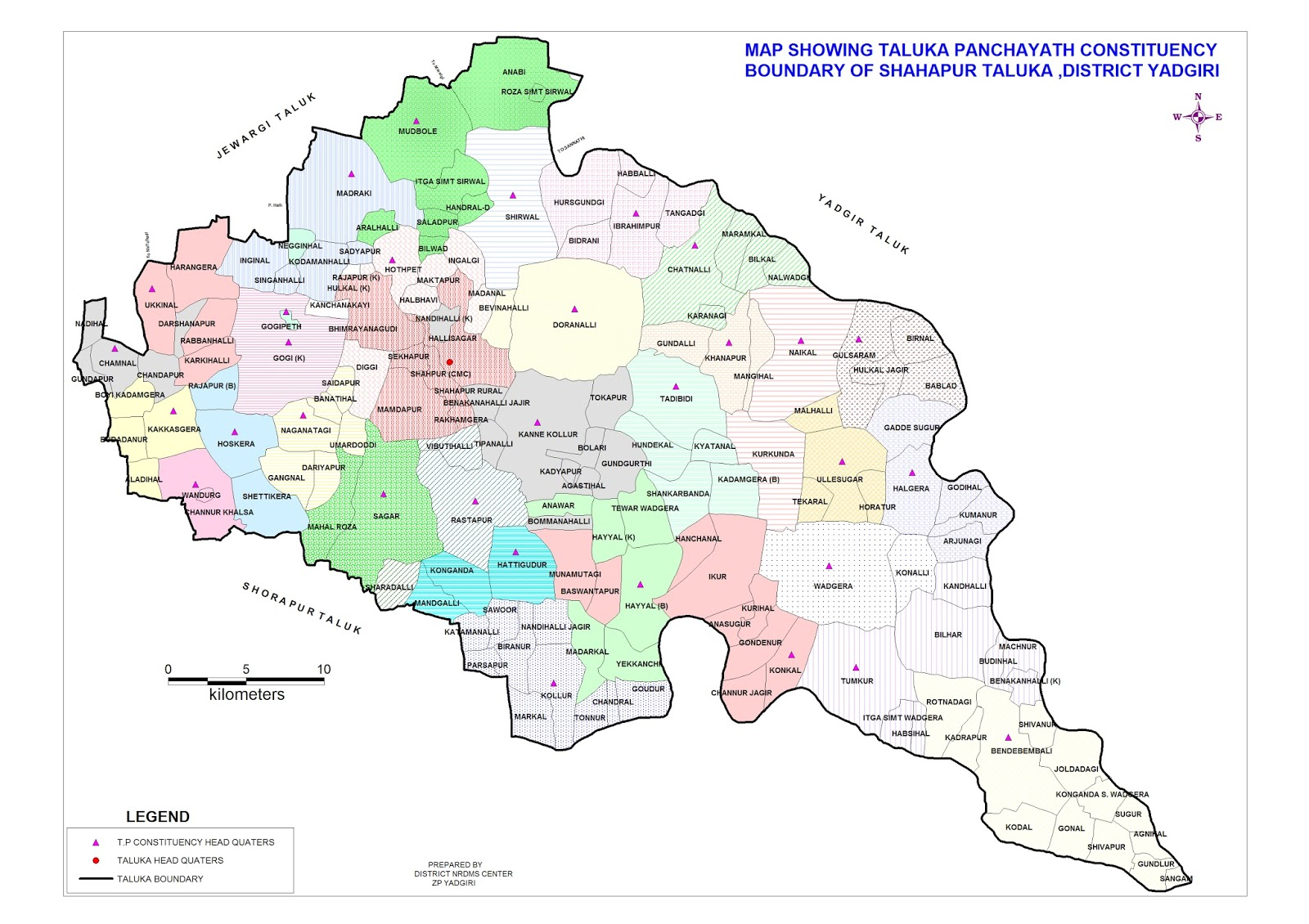
Shahapur Taluk Zilla Panchayat Map before creation of Wadgera Taluk

Shahapur, is a city and taluka headquarter located in the Yadgir district of Indian state of Karnataka. Shahapur is 597 km north of Bangalore and well connected by road to [(Gulbarga) (Kalaburagi)] (75 km), Hyderabad (240 km), Bidar (190 km), Raichur (95 km) and Yadgir (35 km).

== Geography ==
Shahapur is located at 16.7°N 76.83°E. It has an average elevation of 428 metres (1404 feet).

== Demographics ==
As per the 2011 Indian census, Shahapur had a population of 57,129. Males constitute 52% of the population and females 48%. Shahapur has an average literacy rate of 52%, lower than the national average of 65.38% and also lower than the state literacy which is 67%: shahapur male literacy is 61%, and female literacy is 43%. In Shahapur, 16% of the population is under 6 years of age. Shahapur is a Muslim-majority city in Karnataka with 20% Hindus.

== About ==
The Town Municipal Council (TMC) Shahapur was constituted in 1954 and this TMC is upgraded (in 2015) as a (CMC) (City Municipal Council). The CMC has 32 wards and an equal number of councillors. Shahapura CMC stretches to an area of 13.65 km^{2}. Summer Temperature as high as 45 -43 degree Celsius and Winter Temp-27 degree Celsius

== Name ==
As per the mythology, the old name of Shahapur was "Sagar". In support of this name there is historical evidence such as the sobriquet of the Vijayanagara Kingdom's last ruler Ramaraya (son-in-law of Srikrishna Devaraya), who was also called "Sagara Sankramanaraya". After the Muslim attack, the name of the city was changed to Nusratabad. As per historians after the attack "Sagar "village is shifted to the other side of the hill line and the original Sagar has been abandoned for some time and was called "Halu Sagar". As time passes and now it is called as "Hali Sagar" means Old Sagar. The area between Krishna and Bhima rivers is called "Sagara Nadu". It consists of Shahapur, Surpur (Shorapur) and Jewargi talukas.

== Taluk ==
The Shahpur Taluka contains 22 panchayat villages:

- Anabi
- Chamnal
- Chatnalli
- Doranhalli
- Gogikona
- Gogipeth
- Hattigudur
- Hoskera
- Hotpet
- Ibrahimpur
- Kakkasgera
- Kannekollur
- Khanapur
- Kollur
- Mudbool
- Maddarki
- Naganatagi
- Rastapur
- Sagar
- Sirval (Sirwal)
- Ukkinal
- Vanadurg (Wandurg)

== Climate ==
Climate data for Shahapura, India
Month	Jan	Feb	Mar	Apr	May	Jun	Jul	Aug	Sep	Oct	Nov	Dec	Year
Mean daily maximum °C (°F)	30.6 (87.1)	33.4 (92.1)	36.6 (97.9)	38.6 (101.5)	39.4 (102.9)	34.7 (94.5)	31.5 (88.7)	31.4 (88.5)	31.3 (88.3)	31.8 (89.2)	30.4 (86.7)	29.6 (85.3)	33.3 (91.9)
Daily mean °C (°F)	24 (75)	26.5 (79.7)	29.5 (85.1)	31.9 (89.4)	32.7 (90.9)	29.2 (84.6)	27.1 (80.8)	26.9 (80.4)	26.7 (80.1)	26.8 (80.2)	24.6 (76.3)	23.2 (73.8)	27.4 (81.4)
Mean daily minimum °C (°F)	17.5 (63.5)	19.6 (67.3)	22.5 (72.5)	25.3 (77.5)	26.0 (78.8)	23.8 (74.8)	22.8 (73.0)	22.5 (72.5)	22.2 (72.0)	21.8 (71.2)	18.9 (66.0)	16.8 (62.2)	21.6 (70.9)
Average rainfall mm (inches)	0 (0)	2 (0.1)	8 (0.3)	16 (0.6)	29 (1.1)	97 (3.8)	161 (6.3)	130 (5.1)	185 (7.3)	92 (3.6)	16 (0.6)	7 (0.3)	743 (29.1)
Source: Climate-Data.org - Climate Table of Shahapura, Karnataka, India

== Tourism attractions ==
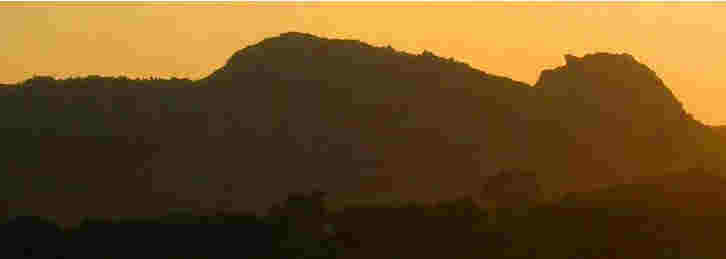
Sleeping Buddha in Shahapur, Karnataka

- Sleeping Buddha Hill, made up of four hills.
- Siddhalingeshwara Temple and Betta, made up of four hills, forest, best views.
