= Hosanagara =

- Town
- Location in Karnataka, India
- Coordinates: 13.92°N 75.07°E
- Country: India
- State: Karnataka
- District: Shimoga
- Subdivision: Sagara

Government
  - Body: Town Panchayath
  - MLA: H Halappa

Area
  - Town: 7.25 km^{2} (2.80 sq mi)
  - Rural: 1,393 km^{2} (538 sq mi)
- Elevation: 614 m (2,014 ft)

Population (2011)
  - Town: 5,839
  - Density: 805/km^{2} (2,090/sq mi)
  - Rural: 112,381

Languages
  - Official: Kannada
- Time zone: UTC+5:30 (IST)
- PIN: 577418
- Vehicle registration: KA-15
- Website: http://www.hosanagaratown.mrc.gov.in

Hosanagara is a panchayat town in Shimoga district in the Indian state of Karnataka. It is nested in western ghats of India. The World Cattle Conference with main emphasis on cow was held in month of April 2007 in Hosanagar. The different uses of cow (not the meat) were exhibited.

== Geography ==
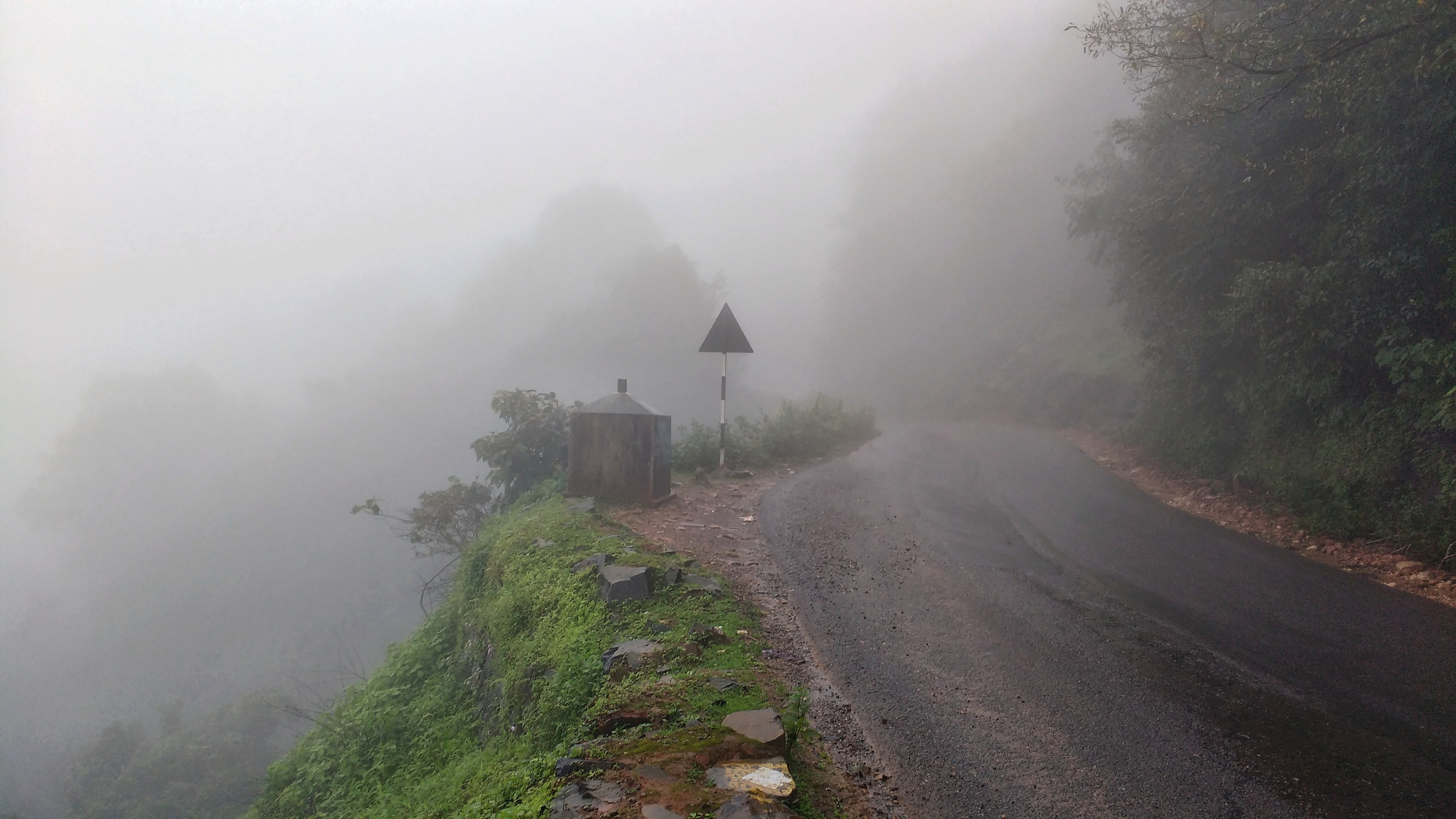
Hulikal ghat, HOSANAGARA

Hosanagar is located at 13.92°N 75.07°E. It has an average elevation of 585 metres (1919 feet).

It is one of the seven taluks of Shimoga District, Karnataka and has 30 gram panchayats.

The Taluk is full of forested areas. A sizable area of the Taluk is covered by the backwaters of Linganamakki Dam, built across Sharavati River. This Taluk receives heavy rainfall during monsoon season (June–October). A megalithic site has been discovered at the Byse village in the Hosanagar taluka.

=== Climate ===
As this taluk is in the windward side of western ghats, this place gets heavy to very-heavy rainfall during the June–September monsoon season. The average precipitation ranges from 3000-8000mm. Hulikal town occasionally gets more than 8000 mm rainfall in a year, making it one of the wettest place in the state, rivalling even Agumbe, which is dubbed "The Cherrapunji of the South".

== Demographics ==
As of 2001 India census, Hosanagar had a population of 5042. Males constitute 51% of the population and females 49%. Hosanagar has an average literacy rate of 80%, higher than the national average of 59.5%: male literacy is 84%, and female literacy is 75%. In Hosanagar, 11% of the population is under 6 years of age.

== Etymology ==
Hosanagar means "new town", distinguishing it from Nagara, which is located at a distance of 17 km, and a historic town of Malnad.

== Constituency ==
Hosanagar is not the MLA constituency of Malnad region.

== Places of interest ==
Humcha, a village located 22 km from Taluk headquarters, is known for a historic Jain temple in the area.

Ramachandrapura Math is located at a distance of 6 km from the town of Hosanagar and karanagiri ganesha temple is located at distance of 5 km near by ramachandrapura mutt

Nagara fort, a fort of Shivappa Nayaka Keladi maha samsthana located at a distance of 15 km from the town of Hosanagara

Kodachadri, located in the amidst of western ghats is paradise for trekkers and nature enthusiast. It is 30 km from Hosanagara. On the way to Kodachadri, one can also visit Hidlumane falls, which is an enthralling waterfalls, is a must visit place in the monsoon.

Kunchikal Falls is located Nidagodu village near Masthikatte in Shivamogga district of state Karnataka. Kunchikal falls cascades down rocky boulders and total height of fall is 455 metres (1,493 ft) according to world waterfall database.

Kunchikal falls is formed by Varahi river.

After construction of Mani Dam near Masthikatte and underground power generation station near Hulikal, the water flow to this falls is greatly reduced and visible only during rainy season (July-Sept). As the falls is within restricted area, Gate pass is required to visit and the pass is being issued at Hosangadi village (about 15 km away). The nearest Airport is at Mangalore, situated 138 km (86 mi) from Kunchikal Falls.

== See also ==
- Ripponpet
- Kunchikal Falls
- Masthikatte
- Kundapur
- Mangalore
- Linganamakki Dam
- Kodachadri
