= Raja Rajeshwari Nagar =

Raja Rajeshwari Nagar or Rajarajeshwari Nagar may refer to these places in India:

- Rajarajeshwari Nagar, Bangalore, a western suburb of Bangalore, Karnataka, India
  - Rajarajeshwari Nagar metro station
  - Rajarajeshwarinagar Assembly constituency
  - Rajarajeswari Dental College and Hospital
  - Jnanakshi Rajarajeshwari Temple
- Raja Rajeshwari Nagar, Mysore
  - Rajarajeswari Medical College and Hospital

== See also ==
- Tripura Sundari also Raja Rajeshwari, a Hindu goddess
- Brihadisvara Temple or Rajarajeshwara, Thanjavur, Tamil Nadu, India
- Rajarajeshwara Temple, Kerala, India
- Raja Rajeswara Temple, Vemulawada, Tenlangana, India
- Polali Rajarajeshwari Temple, Polali, Dakshina Kannada, Karnataka, India
- Rajarajeswaramudaiya Mahadevar Temple, Tamil Nadu, India
- Sri Raja Rajeshwari, a 2001 Indian film
- Raja Rajeswari, Indian-American judge
- Raja Rajeswari Setha Raman (born 1961), Indian-Malaysian poet and translator
- Mahamaya Temple, Raipur or Rajrajeshwari Maa Mahamaya Devi Mandir, Chhattisgarh, India
