= Commonwealth Foundation prizes =

Prizes awarded by the Commonwealth Foundation

Commonwealth Foundation literary prizes
- Description: Suite of international literary prizes presented to writers from Commonwealth nations
- Country: Commonwealth of Nations
- Presented by: Commonwealth Foundation (via Commonwealth Writers)

Commonwealth Foundation has presented a number of prizes since 1987. The main award was called the Commonwealth Writers' Prize and was composed of two prizes: the Best Book Prize (overall and regional) was awarded from 1987 to 2011; the Best First Book prize was awarded from 1989 to 2011. In addition the Commonwealth Short Story Competition was awarded from 1996 to 2011.

Beginning in 2012, Commonwealth Foundation discontinued its previous awards and created a new cultural initiative called Commonwealth Writers, which offered two new awards: the Commonwealth Book Prize for the best first book, in which regional winners received £2,500 and the overall winner received £10,000; and the Commonwealth Short Story Prize for the best short stories, in which regional winners received £1,000 and the overall winner received £5,000. After two years, the Book Prize was discontinued. The Short Story Prize remains the sole award from Commonwealth Writers.

== Commonwealth Short Story Prize ==
The Commonwealth Short Story Prize, set up in 2012, is awarded annually for a piece of unpublished short fiction. It is open to Commonwealth citizens aged 18 and over who have had little or no work published and is particularly aimed at those places with little or no publishing industry.

== Commonwealth Book Prize (2012–13) ==
Awarded for best first book, the Commonwealth Book Prize was established in 2012 for writers who were Commonwealth citizens aged 18 or over and who have had their first novel (full-length work of fiction) published in the year of entry. The Commonwealth Book Prize was part of an initiative by the Commonwealth Foundation called Commonwealth Writers, which seeks to unearth, develop and promote the best new fiction from across the Commonwealth.

Regional winners received £2,500 and the overall winner received £10,000.

The prize was active for two years, 2012 and 2013, and then discontinued.

Year	Region	Author	Title	Country	Publisher
2012	Africa	Jacques Strauss	The Dubious Salvation of Jack V	South Africa	Jonathan Cape
2012	Asia	Shehan Karunatilaka	Chinaman: The Legend of Pradeep Mathew	Sri Lanka	Random House
2012	Canada and Europe	Riel Nason	The Town That Drowned	Canada	Goose Lane Editions
2012	Caribbean	Alecia McKenzie	Sweetheart	Jamaica	Peepal Tree Press
2012	Pacific	Cory Taylor	Me and Mr Booker	Australia	The Text Publishing Company
2013	Africa	E. E. Sule	Sterile Sky	Nigeria	Pearson Education
2013	Asia	Nayomi Munaweera	Island of a Thousand Mirrors	Sri Lanka	Perera-Hussein Publishing House
2013	Canada and Europe	Lisa O'Donnell	The Death of Bees	United Kingdom	William Heinemann
2013	Caribbean	Ezekel Alan	Disposable People	Jamaica	self-published
2013	Pacific	Michael Sala	The Last Thread	Australia	Affirm Press

== Commonwealth Short Story Competition (1996–2011) ==
The Commonwealth Short Story Competition was an annual literary award. It was established in 1996 and administered by the Commonwealth Foundation in partnership with the Commonwealth Broadcasting Association.

Each year winning stories from different regions of the Commonwealth were recorded and broadcast on radio stations across the Commonwealth. The winner received a prize of £2,000 and there were regional prizes of £500 and highly commended prizes of £100.

In 2011, the competition was discontinued.

Year	Author	Country	Title
1996			
1997	Dana Gilkes	Barbados	"Crab Catcher"
1998	Sujam Sankranti	India	
1999	Cherie Jones	Barbados	"Bride"
2000	Dennis Nichols	Guyana	"The Release"
2001	Lelawattee Manoo-Rahming	Bahamas	"Saving Rupa"
2002	Michael Reckord	Jamaica	"The Cleaning Class"
2003	Madhulika Liddle	India	"A Morning Swim"
2004	Otoniya J. Okot Bitek	Uganda	"Going Home"
2005	Preeta Krishna	India	"Treason"
2006	Erin Soros	Canada	"The Moon, the Cat and the Donkey"
2007	Ellen Banda-Aaku	Zambia	"Sozi's Box"
2008	Julie Curwin	Canada	"World Backwards"
2009	Jennifer Moore	United Kingdom	"Table Talk"
2010	Shachi Kaul	India	"Retirement"
2011	Philip Nash	United Kingdom	"Rejoinder"

== Commonwealth Writers' Prize ==
The Commonwealth Writers' Prize was established in 1987, as a successor to the Commonwealth Poetry Prize. Each year, prizes for Best Book (1987–2011) and Best First Book (1989–2011) were awarded in four regions: Africa, Caribbean and Canada, South Asia and Europe and South East Asia and Pacific. Eight regional winners then competed for the pan-Commonwealth Best Book and Best First Book prizes, awarded at a public programme held in a different Commonwealth country each year.

The award was discontinued in 2011, when the Commonwealth Foundation launched a new cultural programme, Commonwealth Writers, which offered the Commonwealth Short Story Prize.

=== Commonwealth Writers' Prize: Best Book (1987–2011) ===
In the following lists for the Best Book Prize and Best First Book, the overall winners are in bold and in blue background; those not in bold are the winners of the listed regions.

Year	Region	Author	Title	Country	Publisher
2011	**Africa**	**Aminatta Forna**	**The Memory of Love**	**Sierra Leone**	
2011	Canada and the Caribbean	Emma Donoghue	Room	Canada	
2011	Europe and South Asia	David Mitchell	The Thousand Autumns of Jacob de Zoet	UK	
2011	South East Asia and South Pacific	Kim Scott	That Deadman Dance	Australia	
2010	Africa	Marié Heese	The Double Crown	South Africa	
2010	Canada and the Caribbean	Michael Crummey	Galore	Canada	
2010	**Europe and South Asia**	**Rana Dasgupta**	**Solo**	**India/UK**	
2010	South East Asia and South Pacific	Albert Wendt	The Adventures of Vela	Samoa	
2009	Africa	Mandla Langa	The Lost Colours of the Chameleon	South Africa	Picador Africa
2009	Canada and the Caribbean	Marina Endicott	Good to a Fault	Canada	Freehand Books
2009	Europe and South Asia	Jhumpa Lahiri	Unaccustomed Earth	India/UK	Bloomsbury Publishing
2009	**South East Asia and South Pacific**	**Christos Tsiolkas**	**The Slap**	**Australia**	**Allen & Unwin**
2008	Africa	Karen King-Aribisala	The Hangman's Game	Nigeria	Peepal Tree Press
2008	**Canada and the Caribbean**	**Lawrence Hill**	**The Book of Negroes**	**Canada**	**HarperCollins**
2008	Europe and South Asia	Indra Sinha	Animal's People	India	Simon & Schuster
2008	South East Asia and South Pacific	Steven Carroll	The Time We Have Taken	Australia	HarperCollins
2007	Africa	Shaun Johnson	The Native Commissioner	South Africa	Penguin Books
2007	Canada and the Caribbean	David Adams Richards	The Friends of Meager Fortune	Canada	Doubleday
2007	Europe and South Asia	Naeem Murr	The Perfect Man	UK	Heinemann
2007	**South East Asia and South Pacific**	**Lloyd Jones**	**Mister Pip**	**New Zealand**	**Penguin Books**
2006	Africa	Benjamin Kwakye	The Sun by Night	Ghana	Africa World Press
2006	Canada and the Caribbean	Lisa Moore	Alligator	Canada	House of Anansi Press
2006	Europe and South Asia	Zadie Smith	On Beauty	UK	Hamish Hamilton
2006	**South East Asia and South Pacific**	**Kate Grenville**	**The Secret River**	**Australia**	**Text Publishing**
2005	Africa	Lindsey Collen	Boy	South Africa	Bloomsbury
2005	Canada and the Caribbean	Alice Munro	Runaway	Canada	McClelland and Stewart
2005	**Europe and South Asia**	**Andrea Levy**	**Small Island**	**UK**	**Review**
2005	South East Asia and South Pacific	Andrew McGahan	The White Earth	Australia	Allen & Unwin
2004	Africa	Damon Galgut	The Good Doctor	South Africa	Viking Books
2004	Canada and the Caribbean	Frances Itani	Deafening	Canada	Flamingo
2004	**Europe and South Asia**	**Caryl Phillips**	**A Distant Shore**	**UK**	**Secker & Warburg**
2004	South East Asia and South Pacific	Michelle de Kretser	The Hamilton Case	Australia	Knopf
2003	Africa	Andre Brink	The Other Side of Silence	South Africa	Secker & Warburg
2003	**Canada and the Caribbean**	**Austin Clarke**	**The Polished Hoe**	**Canada**	**Thomas Allan**
2003	Europe and South Asia	Michael Frayn	Spies	UK	Faber and Faber
2003	South East Asia and South Pacific	Sonya Hartnett	Of a Boy	Australia	Viking Books
2002	Africa	Nadine Gordimer	The Pickup	South Africa	Bloomsbury
2002	Canada and the Caribbean	Alice Munro	Hateship, Friendship, Courtship, Loveship, Marriage	Canada	McClelland and Stewart
2002	Europe and South Asia	Ian McEwan	Atonement	UK	Jonathan Cape
2002	**South East Asia and South Pacific**	**Richard Flanagan**	**Gould's Book of Fish**	**Australia**	**Picador**
2001	Africa	Zakes Mda	The Heart of Redness	South Africa	Oxford University Press
2001	Canada and the Caribbean	Anita Rau Badami	The Hero's Walk	Canada	Knopf
2001	Europe and South Asia	J. G. Ballard	Super-Cannes	UK	Flamingo
2001	**South East Asia and South Pacific**	**Peter Carey**	**True History of the Kelly Gang**	**Australia**	**University of Queensland Press**
2000	**Africa**	**J. M. Coetzee**	**Disgrace**	**South Africa**	**Secker & Warburg**
2000	Canada and the Caribbean	Shauna Singh Baldwin	What the Body Remembers	Canada	Doubleday
2000	Europe and South Asia	Salman Rushdie	The Ground Beneath Her Feet	UK	Jonathan Cape
2000	South East Asia and South Pacific	Lily Brett	Too Many Men	Australia	Picador
1999	Africa	Marion Molteno	If You Can Walk, You Can Dance	South Africa	Shola Books
1999	Canada and the Caribbean	Lawrence Scott	Aelred's Sin	Trinidad	Allison & Busby
1999	Europe and South Asia	Beryl Bainbridge	Master Georgie	UK	Duckworth
1999	**South East Asia and South Pacific**	**Murray Bail**	**Eucalyptus**	**Australia**	**Harvill Press**
1998	Africa	Charles Mungoshi	Walking Still	Zimbabwe	Baobab Books
1998	Canada and the Caribbean	Mordecai Richler	Barney's Version	Canada	Knopf
1998	Europe and South Asia	Vikram Chandra	Love and Longing in Bombay	India	Faber and Faber
1998	**South East Asia and South Pacific**	**Peter Carey**	**Jack Maggs**	**Australia**	**University of Queensland Press**
1997	Africa	Yvonne Vera	Under the Tongue	Zimbabwe	Baobab Books
1997	**Canada and the Caribbean**	**Earl Lovelace**	**Salt**	**Trinidad**	**Faber and Faber**
1997	Europe and South Asia	Beryl Bainbridge	Every Man for Himself	UK	Duckworth
1997	South East Asia and South Pacific	Sue Woolfe	Leaning Towards Infinity	Australia	Random House
1996	Africa	No selection made			
1996	**Canada and the Caribbean**	**Rohinton Mistry**	**A Fine Balance**	**Canada**	**McClelland & Stewart**
1996	Europe and South Asia	David Lodge	Therapy	UK	Secker & Warburg
1996	South East Asia and South Pacific	Gillian Mears	The Grass Sister	Australia	Random House
1995	Africa	J. M. Coetzee	The Master of Petersburg	South Africa	Secker & Warburg
1995	Canada and the Caribbean	V. S. Naipaul	A Way in the World	Trinidad	Heinemann
1995	**Europe and South Asia**	**Louis de Bernières**	**Captain Corelli's Mandolin**	**UK**	**Secker & Warburg**
1995	South East Asia and South Pacific	Tim Winton	The Riders	Australia	Pan Macmillan
1994	Africa	Lindsey Collen	The Rape of Sita	Mauritius	Ledikasyon pu Travayer
1994	Canada and the Caribbean	Margaret Atwood	The Robber Bride	Canada	McClelland & Stewart
1994	**Europe and South Asia**	**Vikram Seth**	**A Suitable Boy**	**India**	**Penguin Books**
1994	South East Asia and South Pacific	David Malouf	Remembering Babylon	Australia	Random House
1993	Africa	Isidore Okpewho	Tides	Nigeria	Longman
1993	Canada and the Caribbean	Michael Ondaatje	The English Patient	Canada	McClelland & Stewart
1993	Europe and South Asia	Lee Langley	Persistent Rumours	UK	William Heinemann
1993	**South East Asia and South Pacific**	**Alex Miller**	**The Ancestor Game**	**Australia**	**Penguin Books**
1992	Africa	Ama Ata Aidoo	Changes	Ghana	The Women's Press
1992	**Canada and the Caribbean**	**Rohinton Mistry**	**Such a Long Journey**	**Canada**	**McClelland & Stewart**
1992	Europe and South Asia	Louis de Bernières	Señor Vivo & the Coca Lord	UK	Secker & Warburg
1992	South East Asia and South Pacific	Albert Wendt	Ola	Samoa/New Zealand	Penguin Books
1991	Africa	Syl Cheney-Coker	The Last Harmattan of Alusine Dunbar	Sierra Leone	Heinemann
1991	Canada and the Caribbean	Alice Munro	Friend of My Youth	Canada	McClelland & Stewart
1991	Europe and South Asia	A. S. Byatt	Possession: A Romance	UK	Chatto & Windus
1991	**South East Asia and South Pacific**	**David Malouf**	**The Great World**	**Australia**	**Chatto & Windus**
1990	Africa	Shimmer Chinodya	Harvest of Thorns	Zimbabwe	Baobab Books
1990	**Canada and the Caribbean**	**Mordecai Richler**	**Solomon Gursky Was Here**	**Canada**	**Viking Books**
1990	Europe and South Asia	Shashi Tharoor	The Great Indian Novel	India	Penguin Books
1990	South East Asia and South Pacific	Robert Drewe	The Bay of Contented Men	Australia	Picador
1989	Africa	Tsitsi Dangarembga	Nervous Conditions	Zimbabwe	The Women's Press
1989	Canada and the Caribbean	Erna Brodber	Myal	Jamaica	New Beacon Books
1989	Europe and South Asia	Marina Warner	The Lost Father	UK	Chatto & Windus
1989	**South East Asia and South Pacific**	**Janet Frame**	**The Carpathians**	**New Zealand**	**Century Hutchinson**
1988	**Africa**	**Festus Iyayi**	**Heroes**	**Nigeria**	**Longman**
1988	Canada and the Caribbean	Jack Hodgins	The Honorary Patron	Canada	McClelland & Stewart
1988	Europe and South Asia	Bruce Chatwin	The Songlines	UK	Jonathan Cape
1988	South East Asia and South Pacific	George Turner	The Sea and Summer	Australia	Faber and Faber
1987	Africa	Ben Okri	Incidents at the Shrine	Nigeria	William Heinemann
1987	Africa	Ken Saro-Wiwa	A Forest of Flowers	Nigeria	Saros International
1987	Canada and the Caribbean	Margaret Atwood	The Handmaid's Tale	Canada	Jonathan Cape
1987	**Canada and the Caribbean**	**Olive Senior**	**Summer Lightning**	**Canada**	**Longman**
1987	Europe and South Asia	Nayantara Sahgal	Plans for Departure	India	William Heinemann
1987	South East Asia and South Pacific	Blanche d'Alpuget	Winter in Jerusalem	Australia	Heinemann
1987	South East Asia and South Pacific	Witi Ihimaera	The Matriarch	New Zealand	Heinemann

=== Commonwealth Writers' Prize: Best First Book (1989–2011) ===
Year	Region	Author	Title	Country	Publisher
2011	Africa	Cynthia Jele	Happiness Is a Four-letter Word	South Africa	
2011	Canada and the Caribbean	Katrina Best	Bird Eat Bird	Canada	
2011	Europe and South Asia	Mischa Hiller	Sabra Zoo	UK	
2011	**South East Asia and South Pacific**	**Craig Cliff**	**A Man Melting**	**New Zealand**	
2010	Africa	Adaobi Tricia Nwaubani	I Do Not Come to You By Chance	Nigeria	
2010	Canada and the Caribbean	Shandi Mitchell	Under This Unbroken Sky	Canada	
2010	Europe and South Asia	Daniyal Mueenuddin	In Other Rooms, Other Wonders	Pakistan	
2010	**South East Asia and South Pacific**	**Glenda Guest**	**Siddon Rock**	**Australia**	
2009	Africa	Uwem Akpan	Say You‘re One of Them	Nigeria	Abacus
2009	Canada and the Caribbean	Joan Thomas	Reading by Lightning	Canada	Goose Lane Editions
2009	**Europe and South Asia**	**Mohammed Hanif**	**A Case of Exploding Mangoes**	**Pakistan**	**Jonathan Cape**
2009	South East Asia and South Pacific	Mo Zhi Hong	The Year of the Shanghai Shark	New Zealand	Penguin Books New Zealand
2008	Africa	Sade Adeniran	Imagine This	Nigeria	SW Books
2008	Canada and the Caribbean	C. S. Richardson	The End of the Alphabet	Canada	Doubleday
2008	**Europe and South Asia**	**Tahmima Anam**	**A Golden Age**	**Bangladesh**	**John Murray**
2008	South East Asia and South Pacific	Karen Foxlee	The Anatomy of Wings	Australia	University of Queensland Press
2007	Africa	Maxine Case	All We Have Left Unsaid	South Africa	Kwela Books
2007	**Canada and the Caribbean**	**D. Y. Béchard**	**Vandal Love**	**Canada**	**Doubleday**
2007	Europe and South Asia	Hisham Matar	In the Country of Men	UK	Viking Books
2007	South East Asia and South Pacific	Andrew O'Connor	Tuvalu	Australia	Allen & Unwin
2006	Africa	Doreen Baingana	Tropical Fish: Stories Out of Entebbe	Uganda	University of Massachusetts Press
2006	**Canada and the Caribbean**	**Mark McWatt**	**Suspended Sentences: Fictions of Atonement**	**Guyana**	**Peepal Tree Press**
2006	Europe and South Asia	Donna Daley-Clarke	Lazy Eye	UK	Scribner
2006	South East Asia and South Pacific	Tash Aw	The Harmony Silk Factory	Malaysia	Harper Perennial
2005	**Africa**	**Chimamanda Ngozi Adichie**	**Purple Hibiscus**	**Nigeria**	**Fourth Estate**
2005	Canada and the Caribbean	David Bezmozgis	Natasha and Other Stories	Canada	Flamingo
2005	Europe and South Asia	Rupa Bajwa	The Sari Shop	India	Viking Books
2005	South East Asia and South Pacific	Larissa Behrendt	Home	Australia	University of Queensland Press
2004	Africa	Diane Awerbuck	Gardening at Night	South Africa	Secker & Warburg
2004	Canada and the Caribbean	Kate Taylor	Madame Proust and the Kosher Kitchen	Canada	Doubleday
2004	**Europe and South Asia**	**Mark Haddon**	**The Curious Incident of the Dog in the Night-Time**	**UK**	**Jonathan Cape**
2004	South East Asia and South Pacific	Nada Awar Jarrar	Somewhere, Home	Australia	William Heinemann
2003	Africa	Helon Habila	Waiting for an Angel	Nigeria	Hamish Hamilton
2003	Canada and the Caribbean	Paulo da Costa	The Scent of a Lie	Canada	Ekstatis Editions
2003	**Europe and South Asia**	**Sarah Hall**	**Haweswater**	**UK**	**Faber and Faber**
2003	South East Asia and South Pacific	Rani Manicka	The Rice Mother	Malaysia	Sceptre
2002	**Africa**	**Manu Herbstein**	**Ama**	**South Africa**	**e-reads**
2002	Canada and the Caribbean	Michael Redhill	Martin Sloane	Canada	Anchor Books
2002	Europe and South Asia	William Muir	The 18th Pale Descendant	UK	Quartet
2002	South East Asia and South Pacific	Meaghan Delahunt	In the Blue House	Australia	Bloomsbury
2001	Africa	K. Sello Duiker	Thirteen Cents	South Africa	David Philip Publishing
2001	Canada and the Caribbean	Pearl Luke	Burning Ground	Canada	Flamingo
2001	**Europe and South Asia**	**Zadie Smith**	**White Teeth**	**UK**	**Hamish Hamilton**
2001	South East Asia and South Pacific	Arabella Edge	The Company: The Story of a Murderer	Australia	Picador
2000	Africa	Funso Aiyejina	The Legend of the Rockhills and Other Stories	Nigeria	TSAR Publications
2000	**Canada and the Caribbean**	**Jeffrey Moore**	**Prisoner in a Red-Rose Chain**	**Canada**	**Thistledown Press**
2000	Europe and South Asia	Raj Kamal Jha	The Blue Bedspread	India	Picador
2000	South East Asia and South Pacific	Kapka Kassabova	Reconnaissance	New Zealand	Penguin Books
1999	Africa	Benjamin Kwakye	The Clothes of Nakedness	Ghana	Heinemann
1999	**Canada and the Caribbean**	**Kerri Sakamoto**	**The Electrical Field**	**Canada**	**Knopf**
1999	Europe and South Asia	Manju Kapur	Difficult Daughters	India	Penguin Books
1999	South East Asia and South Pacific	Catherine Chidgey	In a Fishbone Church	New Zealand	Victoria University Press
1998	Africa	Pamela Jooste	Dance with a Poor Man's Daughter	South Africa	Doubleday
1998	**Canada and the Caribbean**	**Tim Wynveen**	**Angel Falls**	**Canada**	**Key Porter Books**
1998	Europe and South Asia	A. Sivanandan	When Memory Dies	UK	Arcadia Books
1998	South East Asia and South Pacific	Emma Tom	Deadset	Australia	Random House
1997	Africa	Ronnie Govender	At the Edge and other Cato Manor Stories	South Africa	Hibbard Publishers
1997	**Canada and the Caribbean**	**Ann-Marie MacDonald**	**Fall on Your Knees**	**Canada**	**Knopf**
1997	Europe and South Asia	Jeremy Poolman	Interesting Facts about the State of Arizona	UK	Faber and Faber
1997	South East Asia and South Pacific	Sia Figiel	Where We Once Belonged	Samoa	Pasifika Press
1996	Africa	Dene Coetzee	Winds of Change	South Africa	Hodder and Stoughton
1996	Canada and the Caribbean	Thomas Wharton	Icefields	Canada	NeWest Publishers
1996	**Europe and South Asia**	**Vikram Chandra**	**Red Earth and Pouring Rain**	**India**	**Penguin Books**
1996	South East Asia and South Pacific	Charlotte Randall	Dead Sea Fruit	New Zealand	Reed Publishing
1995	Africa	Margaret A. Ogola	The River and the Source	Kenya	Focus Books
1995	Canada and the Caribbean	Hiromi Goto	Chorus of Mushrooms	Canada	Newest Publishing
1995	Europe and South Asia	Derek Beaven	Newton's Niece	UK	Faber & Faber
1995	**South East Asia and South Pacific**	**Adib Khan**	**Seasonal Adjustments**	**Australia**	**Allen and Unwin**
1994	Africa	Lucy Safo	Cry a Whisper	Ghana	Bogle-L'Ouverture
1994	Canada and the Caribbean	Vanessa Spence	The Roads are Down	Jamaica	Heinemann
1994	**Europe and South Asia**	**Keith Oatley**	**The Case of Emily V**	**UK**	**Secker & Warburg**
1994	South East Asia and South Pacific	Fotini Epanomitis	The Mule's Foal	Australia	Allen & Unwin
1993	Africa	Paul Conton	The Price of Liberty	Sierra Leone	Macmillan
1993	Canada and the Caribbean	Alecia McKenzie	Satellite City	Jamaica	Longman
1993	**Europe and South Asia**	**Githa Hariharan**	**The Thousand Faces of Night**	**India**	**Penguin Books**
1993	South East Asia and South Pacific	Andrew McGahan	Praise	Australia	Allen & Unwin
1992	Africa	Lawrence Darmani	Grief Child	Ghana	Lion Publishing
1992	**Canada and the Caribbean**	**Robert Antoni**	**Divina Trace**	**Bahamas**	**Quartet**
1992	Europe and South Asia	Amit Chaudhuri	A Strange and Sublime Address	India	Heinemann
1992	South East Asia and South Pacific	Beryl Fletcher	The Word Burners	New Zealand	Daphne Brasell
1991	Africa	Karen King-Aribisala	Our Wife and Other Stories	Nigeria	Malthouse Press
1991	**Canada and the Caribbean**	**Pauline Melville**	**Shape Shifter**	**Guyana**	**The Women's Press**
1991	Europe and South Asia	Louis de Bernières	The War of Don Emmanuel's Nether Parts	UK	Secker & Warburg
1991	South East Asia and South Pacific	Thea Welsh	The Story of the Year of 1912 in the Village of Elza Darzins	Australia	Simon & Schuster
1990	Africa	M.G. Vassanji	The Gunny Sack	Kenya	Heinemann
1990	Canada and the Caribbean	Darlene Barry Quaife	Bone Bird	Canada	Turnstone Press
1990	Europe and South Asia	Paul Griffiths	Myself and Marco Polo	UK	Chatto & Windus
1990	**South East Asia and South Pacific**	**John Cranna**	**Visitors**	**New Zealand**	**Heinemann**
1989	Africa	No selection made			
1989	**Canada and the Caribbean**	**Bonnie Burnard**	**Women of Influence**	**Canada**	**Coteau Books**
1989	Europe and South Asia	Allan Sealy	The Trotter-Nama	India	Viking Books
1989	South East Asia and South Pacific	Gillian Mears	Ride a Cock Horse	Australia	Pascoe Publishing
