= Paulo Costa (disambiguation) =

Paulo Costa (born 1991) is a Brazilian mixed martial artist.

Paulo Costa or Paulo da Costa may also refer to:

- Paulinho da Costa (born 1948), Brazilian percussionist
- Paulo Costa Lima (born 1954), Brazilian composer
- Paulo da Costa (writer) (born 1965), Angolan-born Canadian-Portuguese writer
- Paulo Costa (footballer) (born 1979), Portuguese footballer
- Tinga (footballer, born 1981) (Paulo Edson Nascimento Costa), Brazilian footballer

== See also ==
- Paolo Costa (disambiguation)
