= Poolman =

Poolman is a surname.

== Notable people with the surname ==
- Danie Poolman (born 1989), South African rugby union player
- Jeremy Poolman, British author
- Jim Poolman (born 1970), American banker and politician
- Samantha Poolman (born 1991), Australian netball player
- Tucker Poolman (born 1993), American professional ice hockey defenseman

== See also ==
- Poolman (film), a film directed, produced, co-written by and starring Chris Pine
