= Robert Antoni (disambiguation) =

Robert Antoni may refer to:

- Robert Antoni (born 1958), West Indian writer
- Robert "Stewkey" Antoni (1947–2023), American musician

== See also ==
- Robert Anthony (born 1982), wrestler
