= List of dental colleges in India =

This is a list of dental colleges in India.

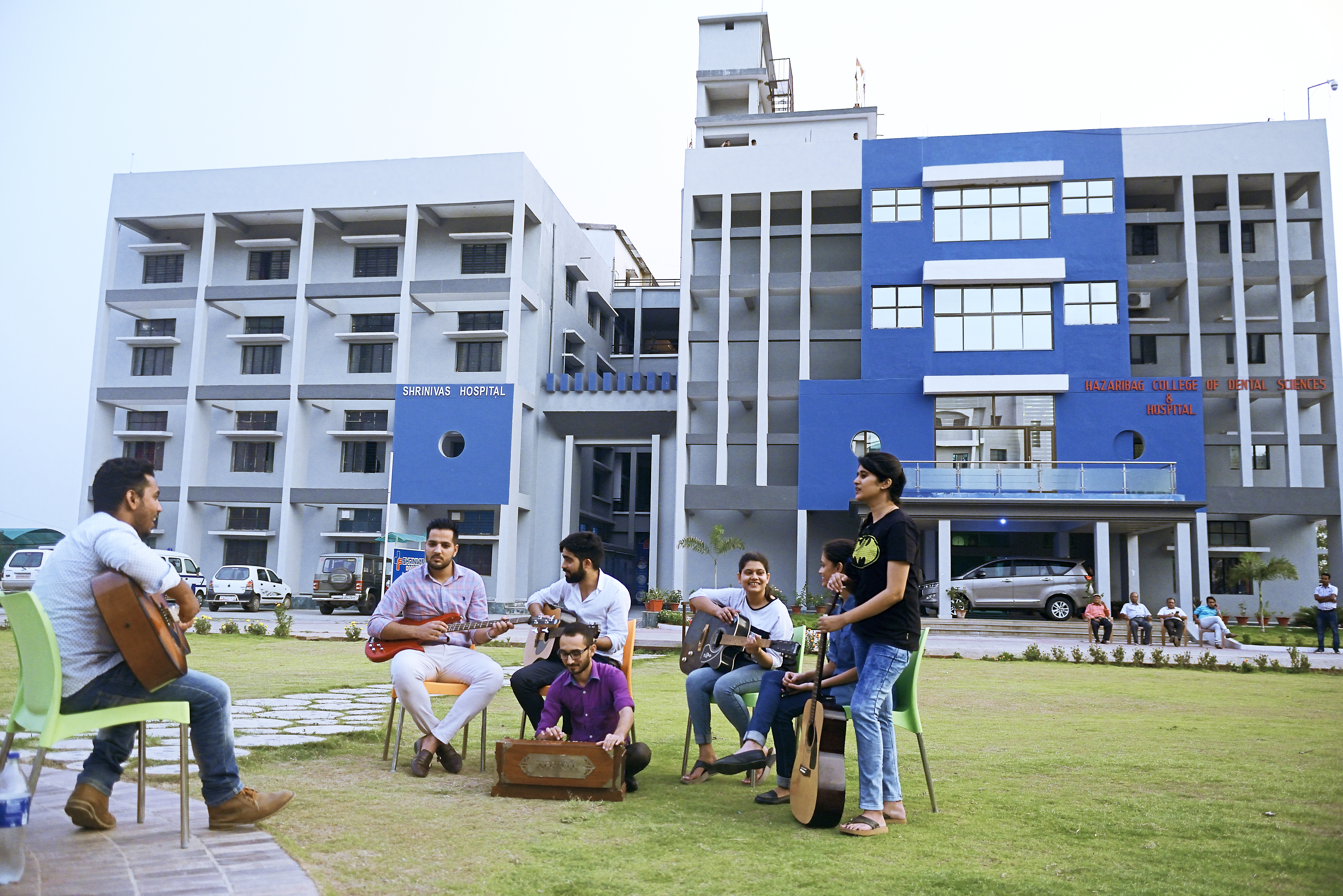
Awadh Dental College And Hospital Jamshedpur, Jharkhand

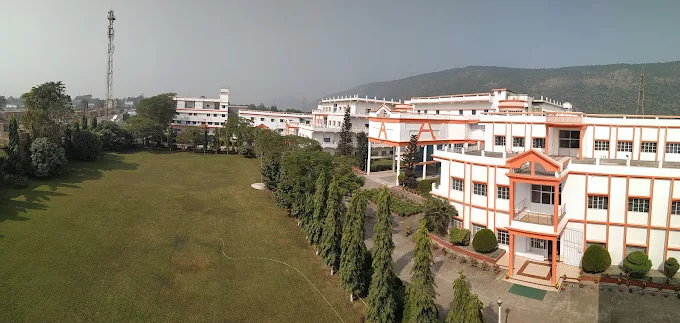
Awadh Dental College And Hospital Jamshedpur, Jharkhand

== Assam ==
1. Dibrugarh Dental College
2. Regional Dental College, Guwahati

== Jharkhand ==
1. Dental Institute, Rajendra Institute of Medical Sciences, Ranchi
2. Hazaribag College of Dental Sciences and Hospital, Hazaribagh

== Karanataka ==
1. Coorg Institute of Dental Sciences
2. Government Dental College, Bangalore
3. Manipal College of Dental Sciences, Manipal
4. Manipal College of Dental Sciences, Mangalore
5. Rajarajeswari Dental College and Hospital, Bengaluru

== Manipur ==
1. RIMS Dental college, Imphal
2. Jawaharlal Nehru Institute of Medical Sciences Dental College, Imphal

== Uttar Pradesh ==
1. Purvanchal Institute of Dental Sciences, GIDA, Gorakhpur

== West Bengal ==
1. Dr. R. Ahmed Dental College and Hospital, Kolkata
2. Burdwan Dental College and Hospital
3. North Bengal Dental College and Hospital, Siliguri
4. Guru Nanak Institute of Dental Sciences and Research, Panihati
5. Kusum Devi Sunderlal Dugar Jain Dental College and Hospital, Kolkata

== Other states or union territories ==
1. Baba Jaswant Singh Dental College, Hospital & Research Institute Ludhiana, Punjab
