= The Last Harmattan of Alusine Dunbar =

Novel by Syl Cheney-Coker

- Author: Syl Cheney-Coker
- Genre: Literary fiction, Magical realism
- Publisher: Heinemann International Incorporated
- Publication date: 1991
- Publication place: Sierra Leone
- Media type: Print (hardcover)
- Award: Commonwealth Writers' Prize (1991)
- ISBN: 978-0-435-90572-9

The Last Harmattan of Alusine Dunbar is a novel by Syl Cheney-Coker. It won the Africa region of the 1991 Commonwealth Writers' Prize. The novel uses magical realism to comment on events by a prophet in the after-life.

== Analysis ==
According to Publishers Weekly, The Last Harmattan of Alusine Dunbar is "full of such unusual occurrences, but in the tradition of magical realism, a sense of history and psychological drama make the story believable. The riveting skeleton of the narrative is often slowed, however, by fatty adjectives and verbiage, and tired metaphors (such as "the floodgates of her desires'') sometimes mar the otherwise titillating love scenes".

== Bibliography ==
- Cheney-Coker, Syl (1990). The Last Harmattan of Alusine Dunbar. Oxford: Heinemann International Incorporated. ISBN 978-0-435-90572-9.
