= Blessed Is the Fruit =

1997 novel by Robert Antoni

- First US edition
- Author: Robert Antoni
- Publisher: Henry Holt
- Publication date: 1997
- Publication place: Trinidad and Tobago
- Pages: 399
- ISBN: 0-8050-4925-8
- OCLC: 44820758

Blessed Is the Fruit is a novel by Robert Antoni. Published in 1997 by Henry Holt, it explores the fluid boundaries of race in the Caribbean.

== Reception ==
Betsy Willeford, writing in The Miami Herald, found that while the books was "both earthy and litary", the "use of symbol and portent blocks out the rader's view" of the characters. James Polk, of The Philadelphia Inquirer, on the other hand, found that "[f]or all its difficulty, for all its surface impenetrability" the book told "a simple story, and told "it very well indeed".
