= Mo Zhi Hong =

Writer

Mo Zhi Hong (born 1973 Singapore) is a New Zealand novelist. His parents were the people of Chinese Singaporean descent. His book, The Year of the Shanghai Shark, won the 2009 Commonwealth Writers' Prize, best first book, South East Asia and South Pacific.

== Works ==
- The Year of the Shanghai Shark, Penguin, 2008, ISBN 978-0-14-300893-4
