= Prisoner in a Red-Rose Chain =

1999 novel by Jeffrey Moore

- First edition
- Author: Jeffrey Moore
- Language: English
- Publisher: Thistledown Press
- Publication date: 29 Nov 1999
- Publication place: Canada
- Media type: Print
- Pages: 345
- Awards: Commonwealth Writers' Prize for Best First Book (2000)
- ISBN: 1-895449-92-8

Prisoner in a Red-Rose Chain (also published as Red-Rose Chain) is the first novel by Canadian author Jeffrey Moore it won the Commonwealth Writers' Prize for Best First Book in 2000, and has been translated into a dozen different languages.

== Plot Introduction ==
The novel chronicles the peregrinations of its love-obsessed picaresque hero, Jeremy Davenant, as he moves from York to Toronto to Montreal’s “Plateau district” and then back to York in pursuit of a destiny, that he believes is determined by a page ripped from an encyclopedia, which includes a university career based on a bogus PhD with a plagiarized thesis on the apocryphal Shakespeare play, A Yorkshire Tragedy, and the intermittently requited love of his “dark lady,” a Roma named Milena.

== Reception ==
- Frank Moher in the National Post, described Moore as “a new, sophisticated comic author who combines John Irving’s inventive virtuosity with Tom Green’s contempt for everything stuffy and comfy.”
- In his review for The Globe and Mail, Jim Bartley praised the novel's “keen characterizations,” as well as its “hugely engaging set pieces and a plot that traces a gratifying arc.”
- Max Davidson in The Telegraph describes it as "a sparkling first novel by a young writer of whom more will surely be heard. It is a clever book, dense with literary allusions, but also a heart-warming one, with a thoroughly likeable hero, as romantic as he is accident-prone." and concludes "a very attractive package indeed: literate, literary fiction, but without a hint of academic mustiness."
- Kirkus Reviews is more circumspect however: "Moore is best at detailing his hero’s haphazard woo-ing and generally sad-sack life. But whenever the story leaves the well-trodden streets of Montreal—described by Moore with an easy familiarity—or academe, it finds itself on less solid ground. Jeremy’s relationship with Gerard, especially everything regarding The Page, takes up far too much of the book’s already somewhat-too-many four hundred pages. Still, in certain of its ways, a charming tale about a loser in love."
