= Jeffrey Moore =

Canadian writer, translator and educator

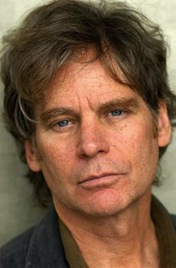
- Moore at International Festival of Authors
- Born: Montreal
- Education: • University of Toronto • University of Ottawa
- Occupations: Novelist, translator
- Writing career
- Language: English and French
- Notable awards: Commonwealth Writers Prize and The Canadian Authors Association Award.
- Website: www.jeffreymoore.org

Jeffrey Moore is a Canadian writer, translator and educator currently living in Val-Morin in the Quebec Laurentians. Moore was born in Montreal, and educated at the University of Toronto, BA, the Sorbonne and the University of Ottawa, MA.

== Career ==
Moore's first novel, Prisoner in a Red-Rose Chain won the Commonwealth Writers' Prize for Best First Book in 2000.

Moore's second novel, The Memory Artists, (published 2004 by Viking, 19 translations) won the Canadian Authors Association Prize for fiction in 2005. It follows Noel Burun, a psychology graduate student with synaesthesia and hypermnesia, as he sets out with three equally eccentric friends to find a wonder-drug cure for his mother's early-onset Alzheimer's. "Moore explores every facet of memory," according to Joanne Wilkinson in Booklist, "as both a burden and a blessing--in this delightful and inspired story." In the New York Times Book Review, Michael J. Agovino described The Memory Artists as "a rich novel, erudite and funny, as much about brain chemistry, the wellness industry and poetry as it is about memory." Agovino concludes that "The Memory Artists is a pleasure to read; it's strangely uplifting to spend time with these flawed but humane characters."

In Moore's third novel, The Extinction Club, (published 2010 by Penguin, 12 translations), Nile Nightingale is on the lam from false charges of child abduction pressed against him by his ex-girlfriend in New Jersey. When he attempts to hole up in an abandoned church in the Laurentians, he encounters the beaten and bloodied Céleste, a fourteen-year-old, animal-rights activist who has been squatting there. Recently orphaned of her last living relative, her grandmother, Céleste turns to Nile for her survival and to continue her battle against poachers ready to hunt the rare North American cougar to extinction. "At its best, The Extinction Club is gripping and incisive," according to the Globe and Mail review by Darryl Whetter, who also credits the novel with integrating "philosophical inquiries into violence and predation with an undeniably dynamic plot."

=== Academic reception ===
Academic treatment of Moore's work, thus far, has focussed on its relation to Quebec literature and, more specifically, to Anglo-Quebec literature. For example, in his essay "Is There an Anglo-Québécois Literature?" Gregory J. Reid notes that "Moore's Prisoner in a Red-Rose Chain includes French-speaking characters and, therefore, code shifting" and that the novel problematizes "the minority status of English in Quebec [. . .] through exaggeration and comic irony rather than earnest denial." In "A Context for Conversation? Reading Jeffrey Moore's The Memory Artists as Anglo-Quebec Literature," Patrick Coleman compares the novel to Robert Majzels' Hellman's Scrapbook and Jacques Godbout's Les Têtes à Papineau and concludes that "Further comparative studies along these lines, in which a particular work is confronted with others from both different languages and literary traditions, would sharpen our understanding of the problematic relationship between theme, style and location in Anglo-Quebec literature." In "Jeffrey Moore's The Memory Artists: Synaesthesia, Science and the Art of Memory," Marc André Fortin analyzes the novel in terms of the interplay between science and literature.

== University teaching ==
Moore has lectured on translation, literature and creative writing at Concordia University, the Université de Montréal, UQÀM, McGill University, Bishop's University, and led workshops for the Quebec Writers' Federation.

== Selected translations of French works ==
- International Festival of Films on Art catalogues 1988—present (Montreal: FIFA)
- Isabelle Van Grimde, The Body in Question(s) (Edmonton:University of Alberta, 2014). Original title Le Corps en question(s).
- Mario Brodeur (ed.), Notre-Dame Basilica of Montreal (Montreal: Éditions de la Fabrique de la paroisse NDM, 2010). Original title Basilique Notre-Dame de Montréal.
- Didier Ottinger, Magritte (Montreal: Montreal Museum of Fine Arts, 1996). Original title Magritte.
- Pierre Vallières, The Impossible Quebec: Illusions of Sovereignty Association (Montreal: Black Rose Books, 1996). Original title Un Québec impossible.
- Jean Clair, Lost Paradise: Symbolist Europe (Toronto: McClelland & Stewart, 1995). Original title Paradis perdu: L'Europe symboliste.
- Serge Tisseron, Stephen Schofield (Lethbridge: Southern Alberta Art Gallery, 1994). Original title Stephen Schofield.
- Michael Snow, ed. 1948–1993: Music/Sound, The Michael Snow Project (Toronto: Art Gallery of Ontario, The Power Plant, Alfred A. Knopf Canada, 1993).
- Lars Nittve, Passagearbeten (Malmo, Sweden: Rooseum, 1993). Original title Passagearbeten.
- Michiko Yajima, Elementa Naturae (Montreal: Musée d'art contemporain de Montréal, 1987). Original title Elementa Naturae.
