= Charlotte Randall =

New Zealand novelist

Charlotte Randall (born Dunedin) is a New Zealand novelist. Her first novel, Dead Sea Fruit won the Reed Fiction Award, and the 1996 Commonwealth Writers' Prize, Best First Book, South East Asia / Pacific.

She studied psychology at the University of Canterbury. She was the 2000 Victoria University Writers' Fellow, and was the 2005 Ursula Bethell Creative Writing Resident, at Canterbury University. She teaches at New Zealand's Writers College. She is married with two children.

== Works ==
- Dead Sea Fruit Secker & Warburg, 1995, ISBN 978-0-7900-0395-5
- The Curative, Penguin Books, 2000, ISBN 978-0-14-029753-9
- Within the Kiss, Penguin, 2002, ISBN 978-0-14-100638-3
- What Happen Then, Mr Bones?, Penguin Books, 2004, ISBN 978-0-14-301917-6
- The Crocus Hour, Penguin Books, 2008, ISBN 978-0-14-300892-7
- Hokitika Town, Penguin Group New Zealand, Limited, 2011, ISBN 978-0-14-356539-0
- The Bright Side of My Condition, Penguin New Zealand, 2013, ISBN 978-0-14-357066-0
