= Mischa Hiller =

British novelist

Mischa Hiller (born 1962) is a British novelist. His novel Sabra Zoo won the Commonwealth Writers' Prize, best first book prize, presented in Sydney, Australia in May 2011.

== Personal life ==
He grew up in the United Kingdom and Dar es Salaam, Tanzania. He lives in Cambridge, England. Hiller suffers from Myalgic Encephalomyelitis, diagnosed in 2006 after ten years of illness.

== Works ==
- Sabra Zoo, Telegram Books, 2010, ISBN 978-1-84659-077-1
  - Fuga dall'inferno. Una storia palestinese, Translator S. Montis, Newton Compton, 2010, ISBN 978-88-541-2134-8
- Shake Off, Telegram Books, 13 September 2011, ISBN 978-1-84659-088-7
- Disengaged, Canongate Books,ISBN 978-1-84751-557-5

== Reviews ==
- Maya Jaggi (19 February 2011). "Shake Off by Mischa Hiller – review". The Guardian.
- Lucy Popesc (23 February 2011). "Shake Off, By Mischa Hiller". The Independent.
- Ina Friedman (3 April 2011). "Suspense / Knowing the enemy". Haaretz. Archived from the original on 8 April 2011.
