= Carnival (Antoni novel) =

2005 novel by Robert Antoni

- First edition cover
- Author: Robert Antoni
- Language: English
- Publisher: Grove Press
- Publication date: January 26, 2005
- Publication place: United States
- Media type: Print (Paperback); E-book
- Pages: 304
- ISBN: 978-0802170057

Carnival by Robert Antoni is a 2005 reworking of Ernest Hemingway's novel The Sun Also Rises.

Though Antoni does draw heavily from the activities of the characters from The Sun Also Rises, Carnival describes the sense of displacement and illusion experienced by the characters who have exiled themselves from their island in the West Indies. The main character, William Fletcher, has a similar wound to Jake Barnes from The Sun Also Rises, but William's wound is a self-imposed one. Though they both cannot use their penises, Jake still has the intense passion to be with women but is unable because of wound he received from World War I. On the other hand, William still has his penis but he becomes fearful whenever he gets involved intimately with women to the point where intimacy and sex become self-described hell. His one and only true love is the vivacious Rachel, who, like Brett Ashley, is the sexual focus of all the men in the novel.

According to Publishers Weekly, the novel falters: "For all the debauchery that is Carnival (think Scotch, marijuana, fireworks, jouvert bands), this section of the novel feels curiously bloodless, perhaps because Antoni's style tends toward short fragments ("He sat up, arms folded over chest. Breathing quickly. His chest rising, falling. Staring down at the ground") and weak transitions ("Before I had a chance to think about it..."; "Before I knew it..."; etc.) The final act of the novel shifts to a remote, mountainous region where William and friends intend to sober up from the merrymaking, but instead find themselves involved in a violent incident involving the Earth People (an isolated settlement of rastas) and a racist police force. Antoni's major themes—race (William is white, Laurence black, Rachel French-Creole) and sexuality—are good ones, but they're not sufficiently developed, and the plot feels somewhat manufactured".
