= Raja Rajeswari Setha Raman =

Malaysian poet and translator (born 1961)

Dr. Raja Rajeswari Seetha Raman
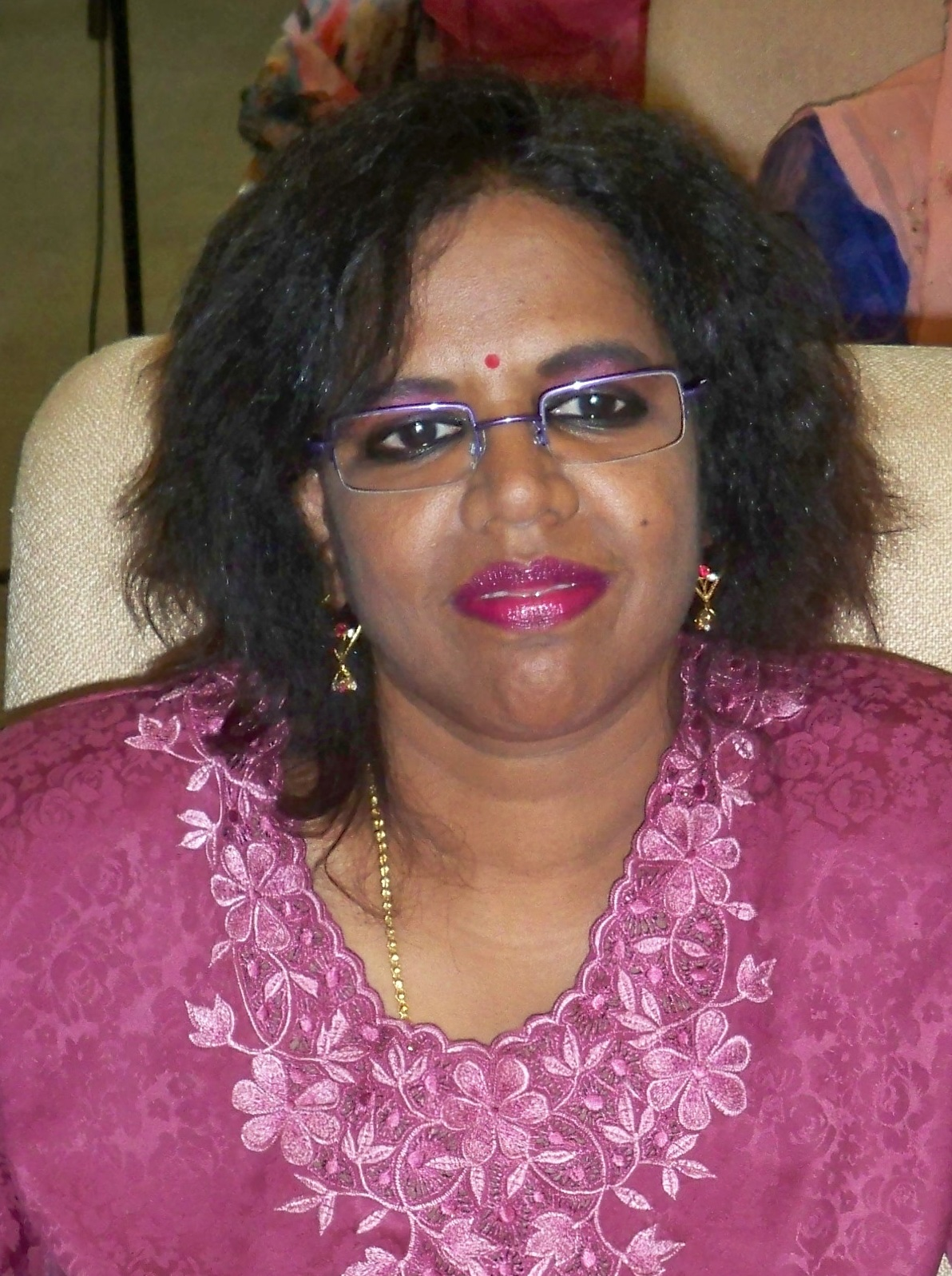
- Raja Rajeswari Setha Raman, Kuala Lumpur, January 8, 2008
- Born: August 19, 1961 (age 65); Kuala Kurau, Perak, Malaysia
- Education: PhD
- Alma mater: Universiti Putra Malaysia
- Occupations: poet, translator, teacher
- Writing career
- Language: Malay
- Notable work: Mekar Bunga
- Notable awards: The main literary award of Malaysia (2006/2007)

Raja Rajeswari Setha Raman (born August 19, 1961, in Kuala Kurau, Perak) is a Malaysian poet and translator. She is an Indian of Tamil descent and is also a lecturer of the Teacher Education Institute, Malay Language Campus.

== Biography ==
She was born in a teacher's family. After graduating from an English-medium high school in Bagan Serai, she then enrolled in the Pedagogical College of Sultan Abdul Halim (Sungai Petani, Kedah) in 1984 and graduated two years later 1986. In 1986-1988, she studied at the Faculty of Modern Languages and Communication of Universiti Putra Malaysia (Serdang). In 2005, she got there also master's degree on a thesis about stories by Uthaya Sankar SB and in 2015 completed her doctorate at the Academy of Malay Studies, University of Malaya. In 2015, she received a diploma of professional translator from the Union of Translators of Malaysia.

In 1995-2007, she worked as a teacher of Malay and English in a number of schools in Kuala Lumpur, in 2008-2016, she was a lecturer of Malay at the Pedagogical Institute of Malaysia (Kuala Lumpur). She made presentations at seminars and conferences in Malaysia and abroad. She is a member of the Commission of the Ministry of Education for writing programmes for literature for secondary schools.

== Creativity ==
She is the only non-Malay who writes poetry in Malay. Her poems are published in leading newspapers and magazines, including the authoritative literary magazine "Dewan Sastera" published by the Institute of Language and Literature as well as in numerous collective collections of poetry. She published two author's collections "When the Flower Blooms" (2006) and "In the same language" (together with Ghazali Dean Ihsan and Chai Lun Guan, 2017).

In the center of attention of the poet is not only the beauty of her native country, but also social problems (in particular, the status of the national language, the fight against corruption), patriotism, ecology, the struggle of oppressed peoples for their independence (Afghanistan, Palestine). Her poetry was translated into English, Bengali, Spanish, German, Portuguese, Thai and Tamil. Several poems became texts for some popular songs: "The Art of Embroidery" (composer Sani Sudin), "Beloved" and "Fate of a Woman" (composer Yusailan Yunus).

He regularly recites her poems on monthly poetry readings of the National Union of Writers of Malaysia, took part in international poetry festivals in Bangladesh, Singapore, Indonesia, Nicaragua.

As a literary critic she publishes articles with analysis of the works of Malaysian writers and poets in newspapers and magazines in Malaysia. In her opinion, K. S. Maniam has migrated to the United States, and Rani Manicka to the United Kingdom, purely for the purpose of being accepted and recognised at the international level.

She is the Honorary Secretary of the "Great Malay Nusantara" (Numera), a member of the Executive Committee of the National Union of Writers of Malaysia and the Union of Writers of Selangor, a member of the Union of Translators of Malaysia, the Union of Cultural Activists of Perak, the World Congress of Poets.

== Awards ==
- Award of the Literary Virtual Community of Malaysia (2003, 2004).
- The main literary award of Malaysia (2006/2007).
- State Literary Prize Perak (2016), (2018).
- Prize of the Institute of Language and Literature for contribution to the development of Malay literature (2016).
- Prize of the Mayor of Rivas (Nicaragua) for the best poem about the protection of ecology (2018).
- Mewadev Laurel Award 2018 from Contemplary Literary Society of Amlov, Banda. U.P, India.
- Represented Malaysia at ASEAN Poem Declaration at the Dewan Bahasa dan Pustaka Auditorium (DBP), on 5 September 2015

== Authors' collections ==
- Raja Rajeswari Seetha Raman. Mekar Bunga. Selangor: Penerbitan Pustaka Nusa Sdn Bhd, 2006.
- Ghazali Din Ihsan Noorzali, Raja Rajeswari Seetha Raman, Chai Loon Guan. Bahasa Yang Sama. Tanjung Malim: UPSI, 2017.

== Poems in collections ==
- Antologi Antiperang. Lakaran dan Puisi. Ed. Raja Ahmad Aminullah. Yayasan Kesenian Perak 2003.
- Prahara di Padang Karbala: kumpulan puisi keamanan dan kemanusiaan Malaysia. Ed. Arbak Othman. Serdang: Universiti Putra Malaysia dan Pustaka Nusa, 2003.
- APAS. Antologi Puisi Pilihan Komuniti Penyair. Kuala Lumpur: Esastera, 2003.
- Peterana Kasih. Pekan: Lembaga Muzium Negeri Pahang (2004).
- Gema Membelah Gema 14: antologi puisi Hari Puisi Nasional Keempat Belas. Ed. Amiruddin Ali dan Hamzah Hamdani. Kuala Lumpur, 2004.
- Ratib 1000 syair: sebuah antologi puisi. [Kuala Lumpur]: Gapena, 2005.
- Manuskrip Luka Bangsa. Ed. Rahimidin Zahari. [Kuala Lumpur]: Persatuan Penulis Nasional Malaysia, 2006.
- Antologi Puisi Agenda Melayu. [Kuala Lumpur]: Yayasan Kepemimpinan dan Strategi Malaysia, 2009
- Antologi Sajak Prihatin Palestin. Genting Gaza, Gentingnya Genting. Ed. Shamsudin Othman, S.M. Zakir: [Kuala Lumpur]: Persatuan Penulis Nasional Malaysia, 2009.
- Antologi Puisi Mengabdi Melestari (PNB 30 tahun). [Kuala Lumpur], 2009.
- Musibah Gempa Padang. Editor Dato 'Dr. Ahmad Khamal Abdullah [Kemala]. Kuala Lumpur: eSastera / Marba, 2009.
- Antologi puisi hari pejuang bahasa: sumpah 152. Ed. S. M. Zakir, Mattaib Nordin, Jaafar Haji Hamdan, Muhammad Ikhram Fadhly Hussin. [Kuala Lumpur]: Gabungan Persatuan Penulis Nasional Malaysia, 2010
- Dari Jendela Zaman Ini. Antologi Puisi Malaysia dan Singapura (From the Window of This Epoch: An Anthology of Malaysian and Singaporean Poems). Compiled by Shamsudin Othman, Gwee Li Sui, Mohamed Pitchay Gani bin Mohamed Abdul Aziz, Tan Chee Lay, and Seetha Lakshmi. Kuala Lumpur: ITBM (2010).
- Syair Persahabatan Dua Negara. 100 Penyair Indonesia-Malaysia. Banjar Baru: Pustaka Senja, 2015.

== Translations into Malay ==
- Aminur Rahman. Perpetual Diary (Diari Abadi). Translated by Raja Rajeswari Seetha Raman. Kuala Lumpur: Numera, 2016
- Puisi 6 Penyair Bangladesh untuk Baca Puisi Dunia Numera (Poems by 6 Bangladesh Poets). Translated by Raja Rajeswari Seetha Raman. Kuala Lumpur: Numera, 2016
- Tawarikh ibu
