= Donna Daley-Clarke =

British novelist

Donna Daley-Clarke (born London) is a British novelist. Her book Lazy Eye won the 2006 Commonwealth Writers' Prize, Best First Book, Europe and South Asia.

She is a graduate of the University of East Anglia.

== Awards ==
- 2000 Arts and Humanities Board Award
- 2001 Jerwood Young Writer's apprenticeship award
- 2004 Arts Council Award
- 2005 Hawthornden Castle fellowship

== Works ==
- A lazy eye, W.F. Howes, 2006, ISBN 978-1-84505-849-4; MacAdam/Cage, 23 March 2007, ISBN 978-1-59692-208-2
