= Divina Trace =

1991 novel by Robert Antoni

- First edition
- Author: Robert Antoni
- Language: English
- Publisher: Robin Clark
- Publication date: 1991
- Publication place: United Kingdom
- Media type: Print (Hardback)
- Pages: 426 pp (hardback edition)
- ISBN: 0-86072-136-1 (hardback edition)
- OCLC: 28112058

Divina Trace (1991) is an experimental novel by Robert Antoni. It won the 1992 Commonwealth Writers Prize for best first novel. It also won a National Endowment for the Arts Grant.

The novel tells the story of the fictional island-nation of Corpus Christi coming into its own identity. The central narrator, Johnny Domingo, relays the story of the mysterious Magdalena and her frog child, as he hears it from seven different narrators, each speaking his own distinctly Caribbean dialect. It utilizes drawings, pictures, and even a mirror.
