= Paolo Costa =

Paolo Costa may refer to:

- Paolo Costa (poet)
- Paolo Costa (politician)

== See also ==
- Paulo Costa (disambiguation)
