= John Cranna =

New Zealand novelist

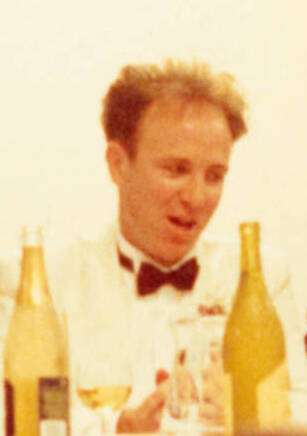
Cranna at the Celebrity Debate at Takapuna Library in 1993

John Cranna (born in Te Aroha) is a New Zealand novelist, who won the Commonwealth Writers' Prize, Best First Book, and the New Zealand Book Award for Fiction for Visitors.

== Life ==
Cranna grew up in the Waikato, New Zealand. He received a BA Honours in Politics and Sociology from Victoria University of Wellington, then moved to the United Kingdom where he lived in Kings Cross, London during the 1980s. Kings Cross was a red light and crime district at the time, and he worked in urban development and renewal for nine years in this impoverished inner city area while completing his first book of short stories. He returned to New Zealand in 1987.

His works of fiction are published in Australia by Heinemann Reed, in the UK by Minerva Books, and in France by Éditions Phébus.

Cranna was editor of AA Directions, from 2000 to 2005, which at the time, was New Zealand's largest circulation magazine. He was also chair of the Auckland Society of Authors for four years. He established and taught at the Auckland University of Technology, Centre for Modern Writing, where he set up the Masters of Creative Writing degree.

He is now director of The Creative Hub, a creative writing centre in the Auckland Central Business District, which he set up in 2010.

He was screenwriter for the short Accidents (2000), directed by Paul Swadel, which was shown at the 56th Venice International Film Festival.

== Works ==
- Visitors, Heinemann Reed, 1989, ISBN 978-0-7900-0050-3
- Arena, Minerva, 1992, ISBN 978-0-7900-0237-8
