= Lucy Safo =

Ghanaian writer

Lucy Safo is a Ghanaian writer best known for her historical novel Cry a Whisper, published in 1993. Lucy Safo's first novel, Cry a Whisper, won the Commonwealth Writers' Prize 'Best First Book' for the Africa region in 1994. Cry a Whisper (1993) was a historical novel set around the triangular slave trade between Liverpool, West Africa and the Caribbean.

The novel is available for purchase on platforms like Amazon and ThriftBooks.

== Works ==
- Cry a Whisper. London: Bogle-L'Ouverture Press, 1993. ISBN 9780904521962
