= Mahamaya Temple, Raipur =

Hindu temple in Chhattisgarh, India

Shree Rajrajeshwari Maa Mahamaya Devi Mandir Raipur
- Mahamaya Mandir
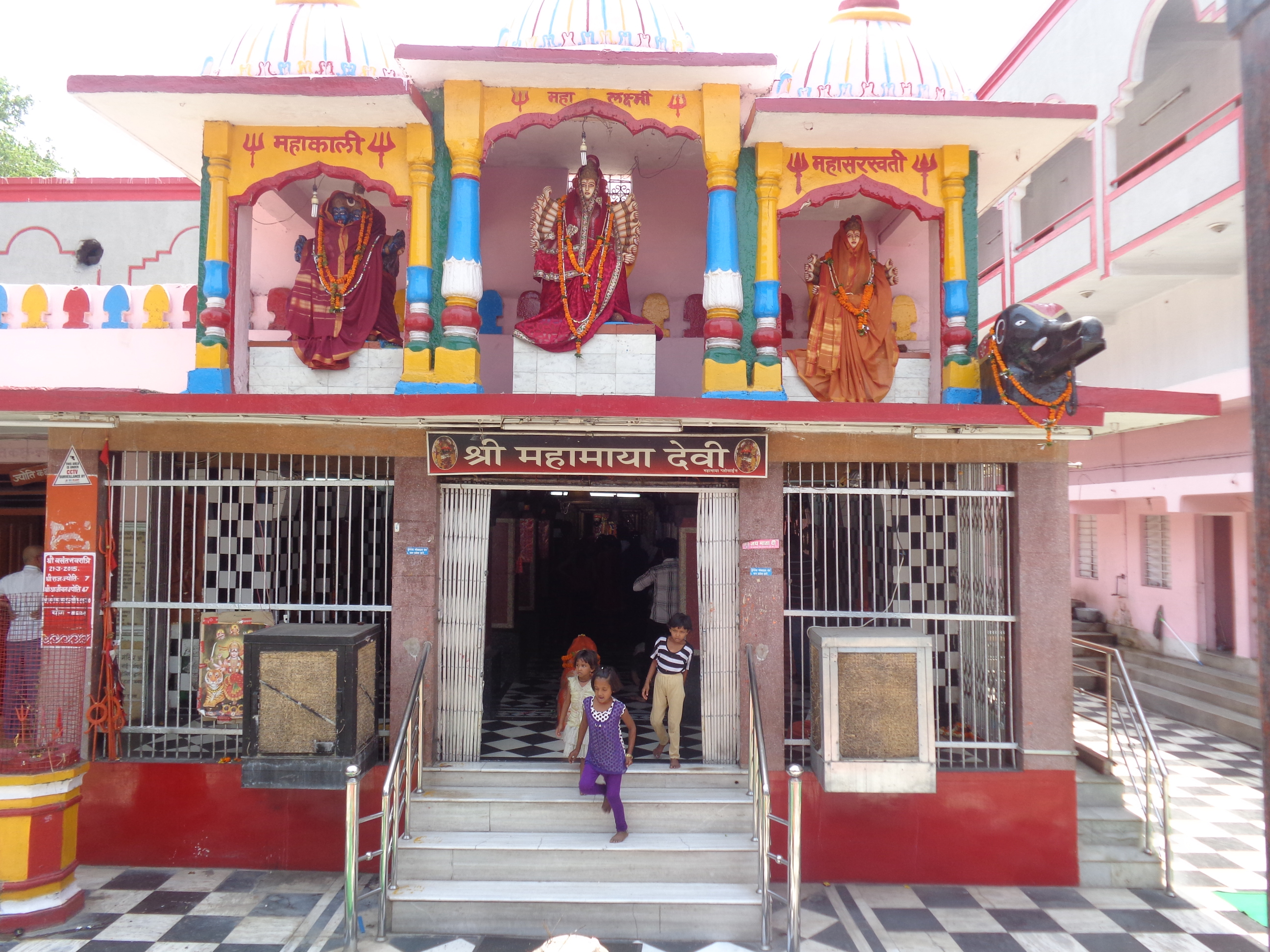
- Temple Entrance

- Location of Mahamaya Mandir Mahamaya Temple, Raipur (India)

Religion
- Affiliation: Hinduism
- District: Raipur
- Deity: Mahamaya; Samaleswari
- Festivals: Navaratri; Durga Ashtami; Vijayadashami
- Governing body: Shree Rajrajeshwari Maa Mahamaya Devi Mandir Raipur Trust

Location
- State: Chhattisgarh
- Country: India
- Interactive map of Shree Rajrajeshwari Maa Mahamaya Devi Mandir Raipur
- Coordinates: 21°13′54″N 81°37′43″E

Architecture
- Type: Nagara Style
- Creator: Raja Mordhwaj
- Established: 17th-18th Century

Shree Rajrajeshwari Maa Mahamaya Devi Mandir Raipur or popularly Mahamaya Temple is a Hindu temple dedicated to Devi Mahamaya, located at Purani Basti, Raipur, Chhattisgarh. The temple is one of the 36 Shaktipeeths or 36 forts of Chhattisgarh. It was renovated between 17th-18th Century by Maratha confederacy rulers.

== Legend ==
Once King Mordhwaj went on a tour of his kingdom with his queen Kumuddhati Devi. When they were returning, it was early morning. King Mordhwaj was on the other side of the river Karun, while crossing the river a thought came to mind that after retiring from the morning routine, travel ahead. Thinking of this, they put their halts on the river bank which is now present Mahadevghat. The maidservants started taking the queen towards the river to take a bath by wearing a cloth veil. As soon as the river reached near, the queen and her maids saw that a huge rock was lying in the water and three giant snakes were sitting with their hoods spread from three sides. Seeing this scene they all got scared and screamed and returned to the halt. All the news was sent to the king. As soon as the news was received, the king immediately came to that place. When he also saw this scene, he was surprised. Immediately called his Raj Jyotishi and Rajpurohit. He also saw and meditated and told the king that Rajan, this is not a stone but an idol of the goddess and is lying upside down. On the advice given by him, King Mordhwaj worshiped methodically after bathing and slowly started moving towards the rock. Three giant snakes started sliding from there one by one. After they left, the king touched that rock and bowed down and got it straightened. Everyone was astonished to see that she stood not on a rock but on a lion and that Mahishasuramardini is an idol of the octagonal goddess Bhagwati. Seeing this, everyone bowed with folded hands. At that time a voice came out of the idol, "O Rajan! I am your Kuldevi. You worship me and honor me, I myself Mahamaya." The king consulted his pandits, acharyas and astrologers and took advice. Everyone advised that the life of Bhagwati Maa Mahamaya should be consecrated, only then it was learned that a new temple has been constructed in the present old township area for some other deity. After completing the construction work in the same temple according to the order of the goddess, the life of Adishakti Maa Mahamaya was consecrated by bringing it from Kharun river completely by Vedic and Tantric method. Let us tell you that the idol of the Goddess installed in the temple is visible from outside. But as soon as one enters the temple, the idol starts looking straight.

== Gallery ==
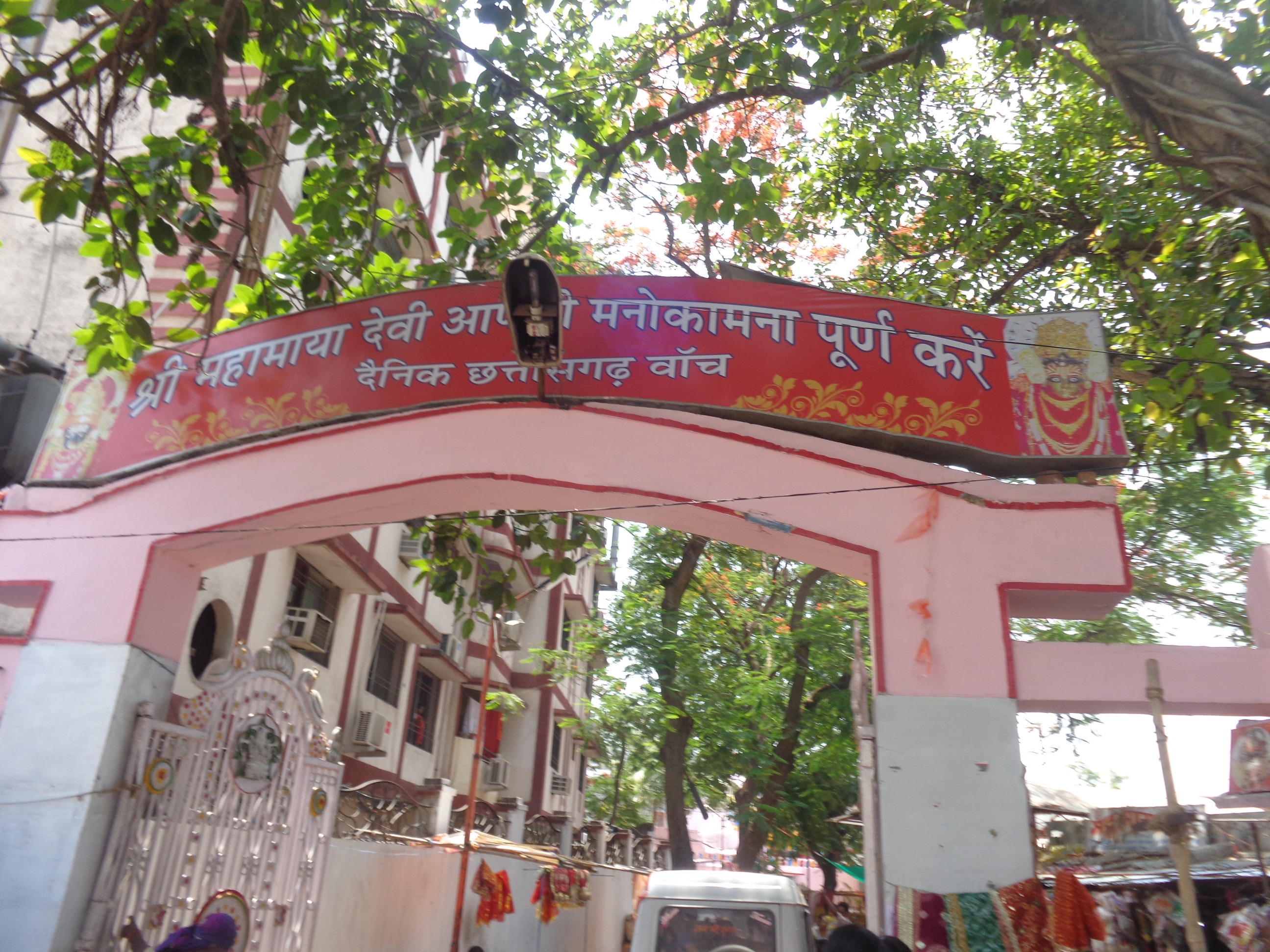
Gate of Mahamaya Mandir

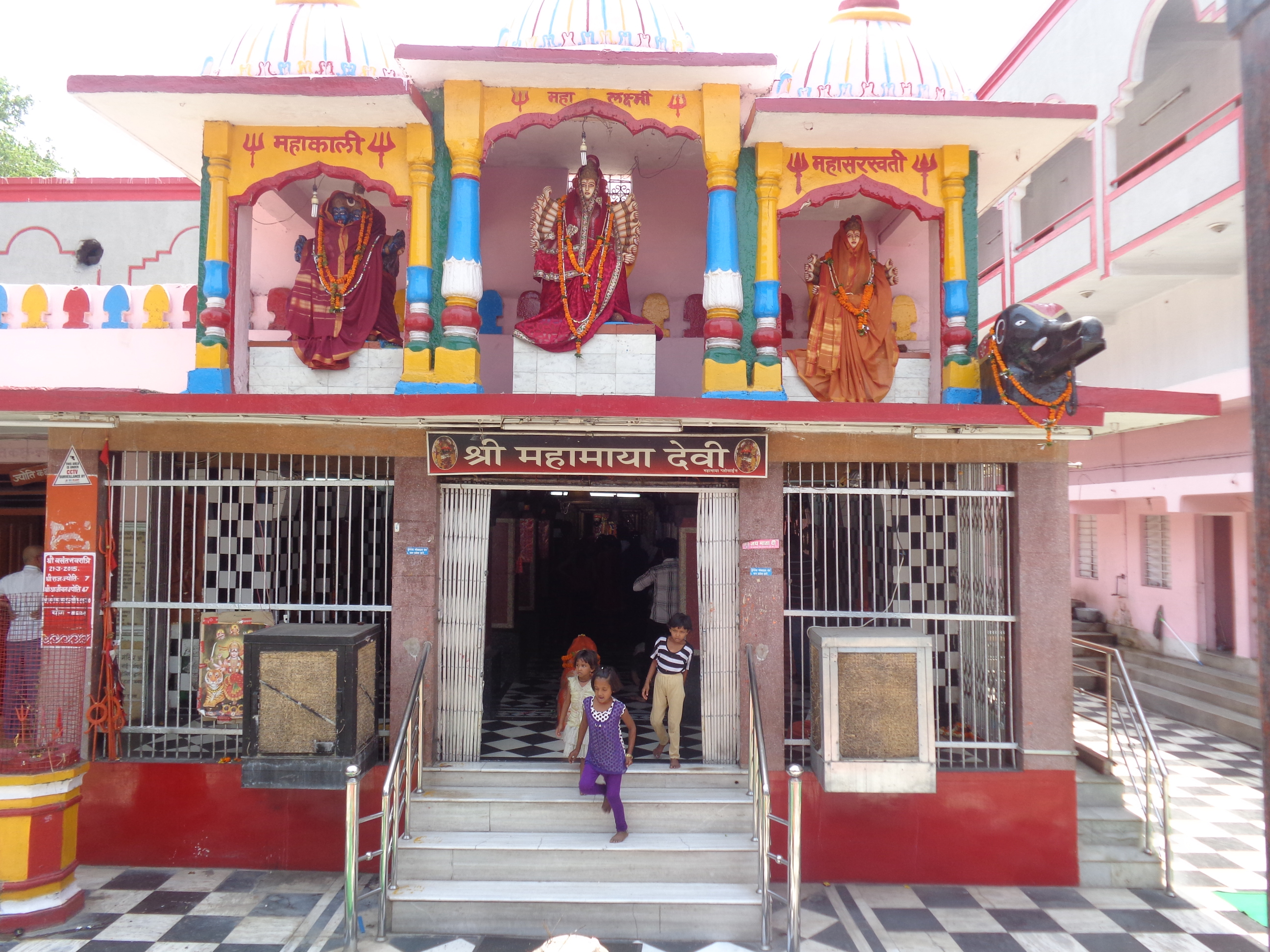
Mahamaya Temple Entrance

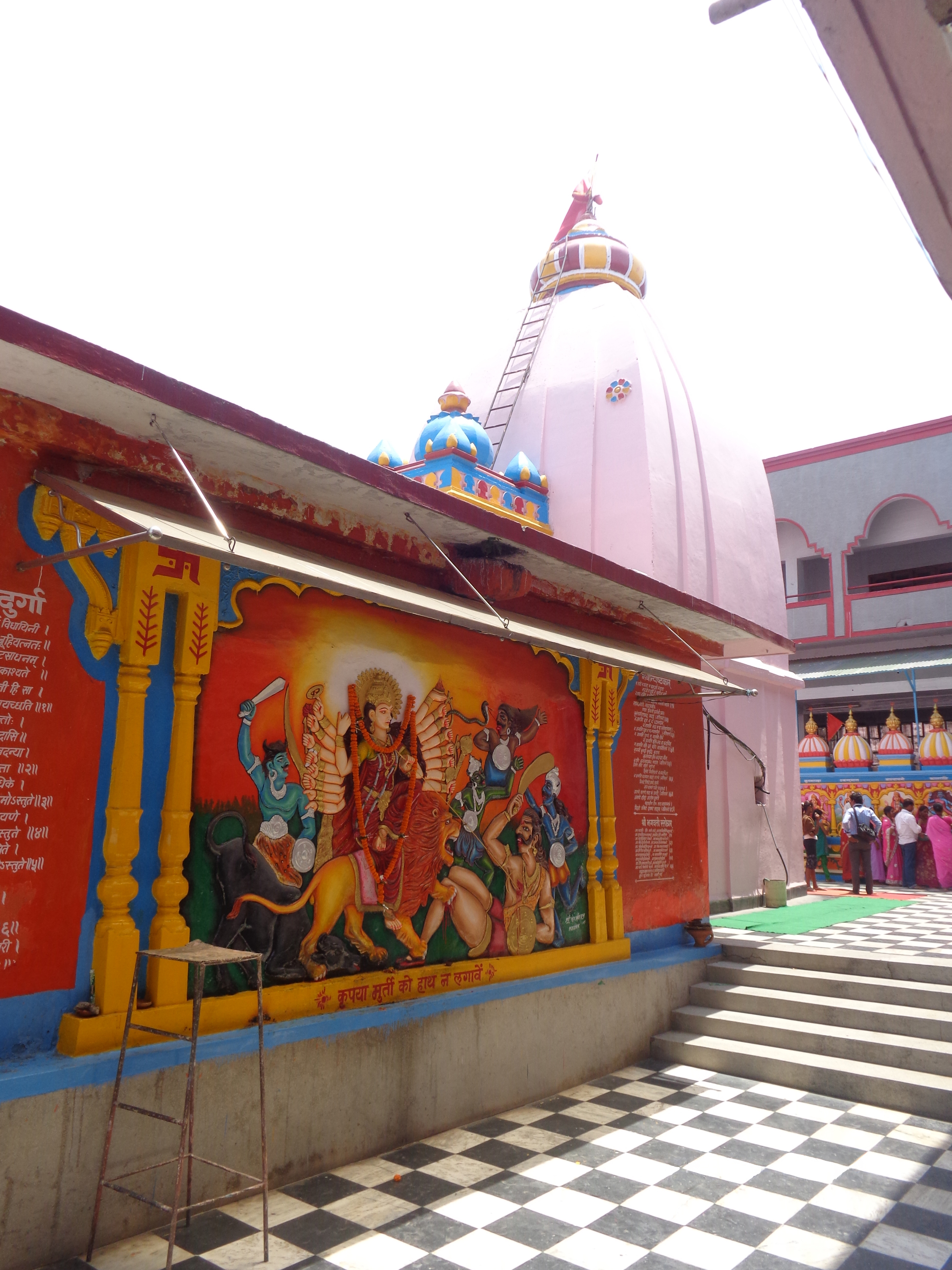
Mahamaya Temple

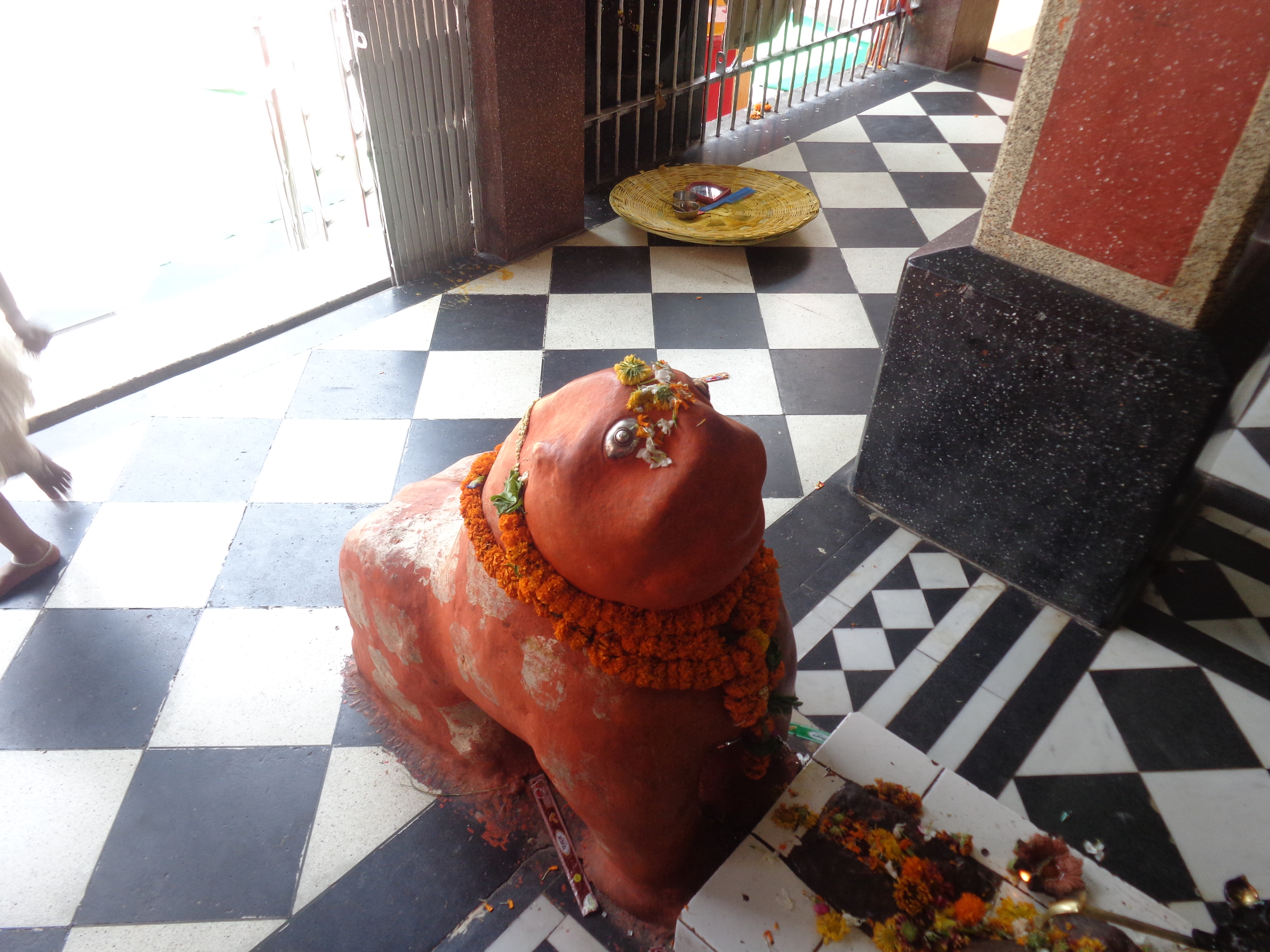
Lion in front of Maa Mahamaya

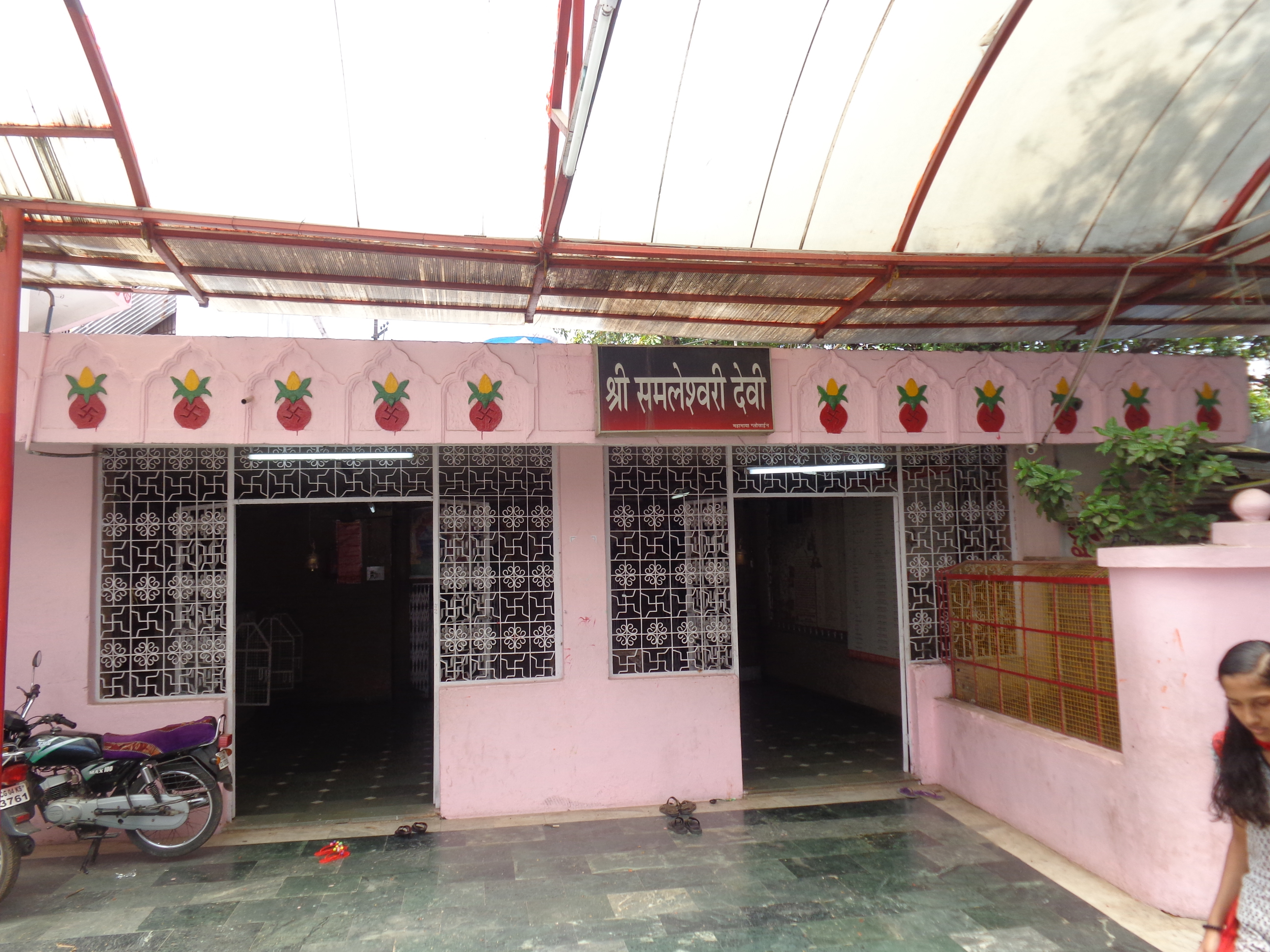
Samleshwari Temple Entrance

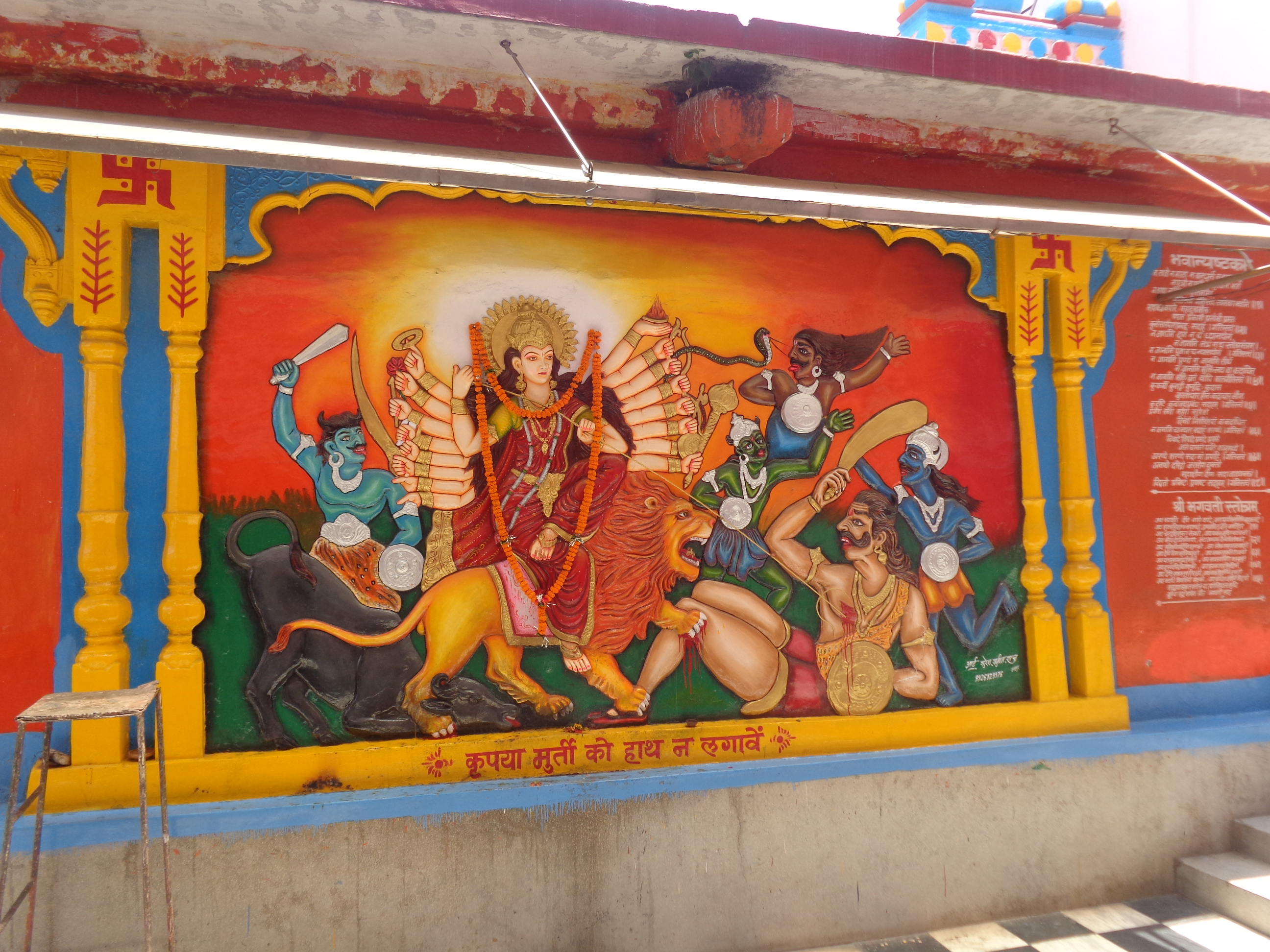
Sculpture of Mahisasurmardini

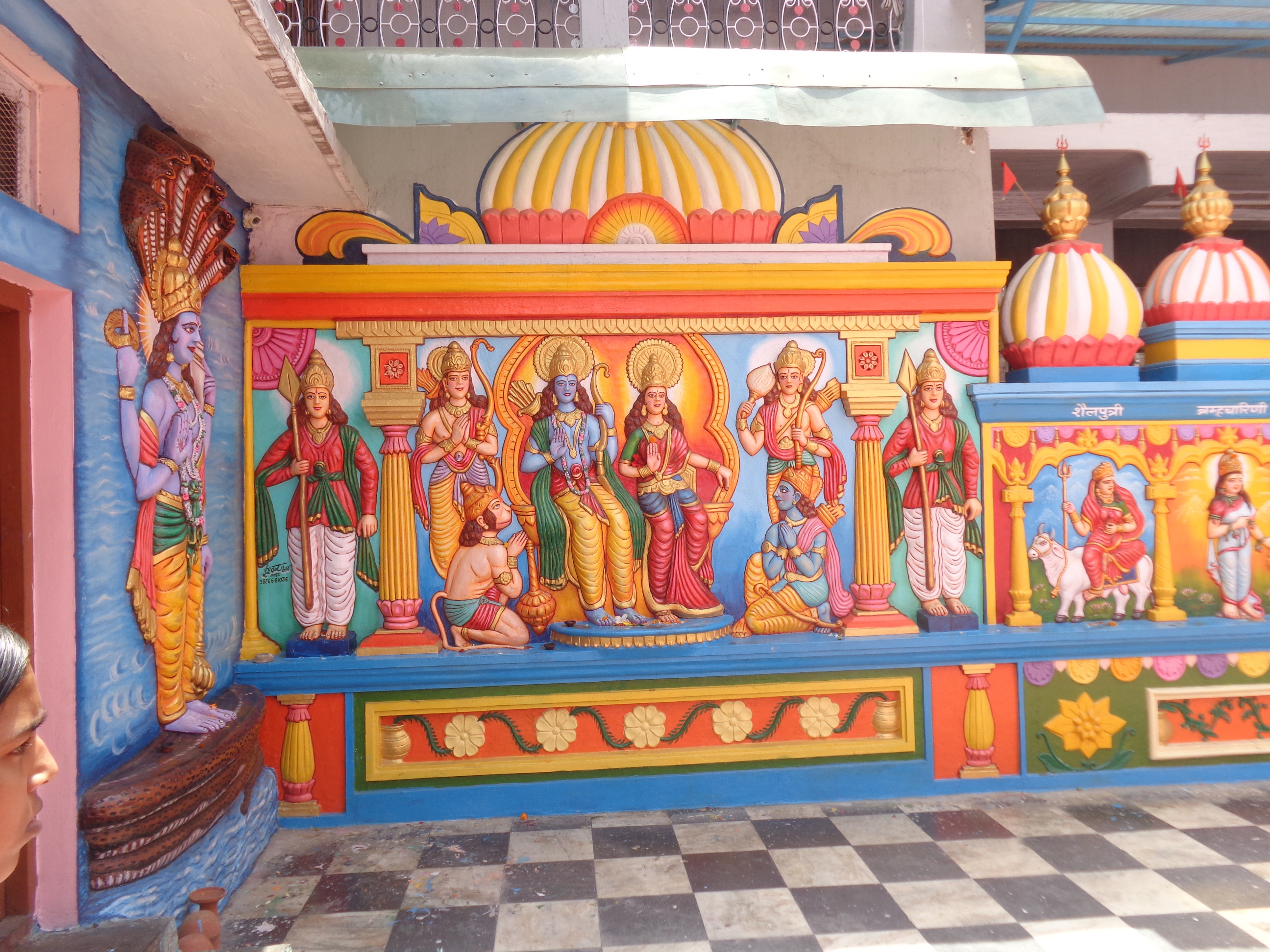
Sculpture of Ram Darbar

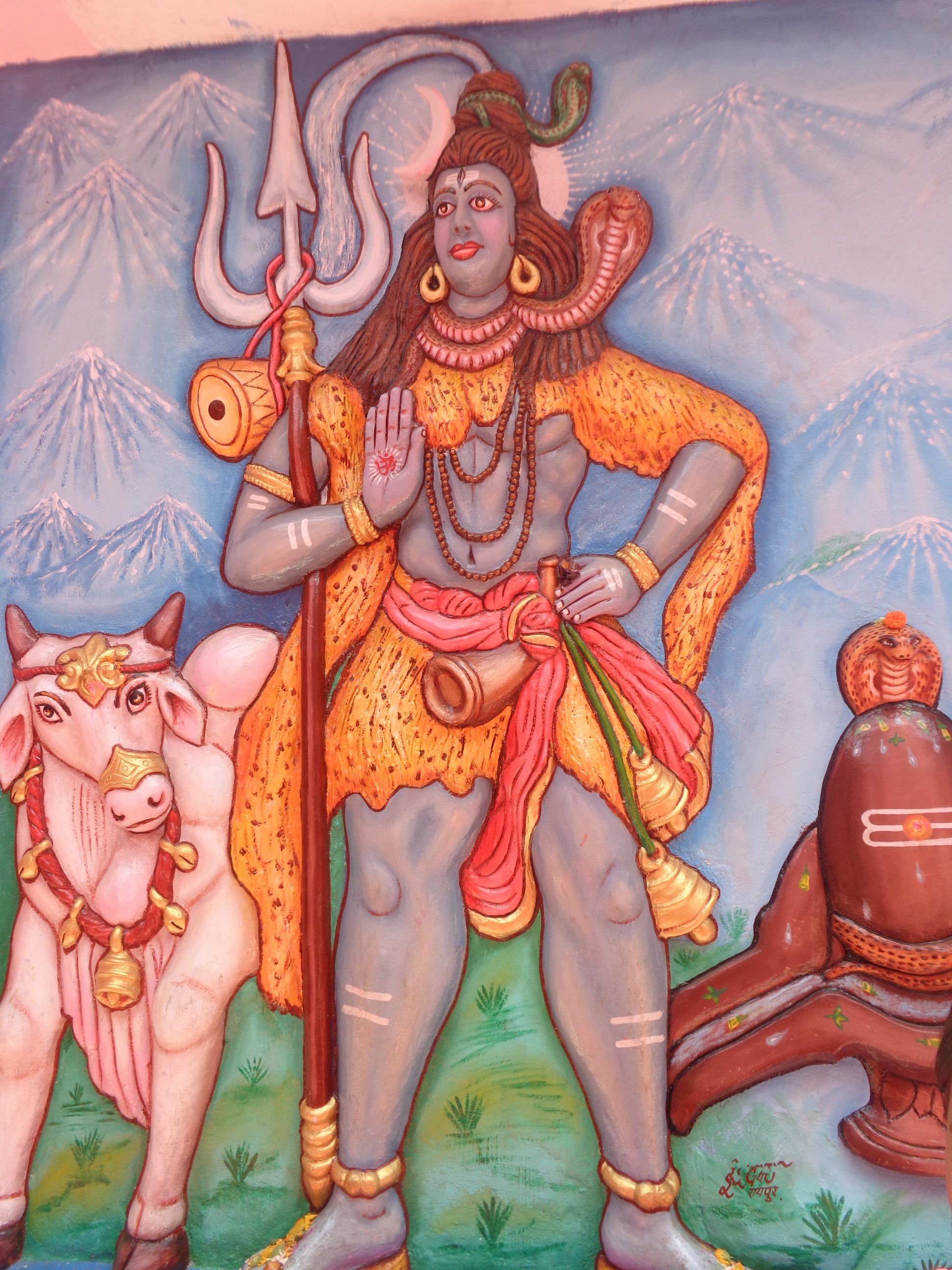
Sculpture of Shiv
