= Purani Basti, Raipur =

Purani Basti in Raipur, Chhattisgarh is one of the oldest known continuously inhabited areas of modern central India. Purani basti in Hindi means "old colony".

"Turi hatri" is an old commercial fruit/vegetable market known as the parent of barter system of exchange.
