= Rani Manicka =

Rani Manicka is a Malaysian-born novelist, who divides her time between Malaysia and the United Kingdom.

== Background, education ==
Manicka grew up in Terengganu and attended the University of Malaysia, where she received a business degree.

== The Rice Mother, first novel ==
Infused with her own Sri Lankan Tamil family history, The Rice Mother is her first novel, and it won the Commonwealth Writers' Prize in 2003 for South East Asia and South Pacific region.

The Rice Mother is a "multi-generational story" and focuses on a Sri Lankan family living in Malaysia. Lakshimi is born in Ceylon, and 14 years old, is married to Ayah, a supposedly rich 37-year-old widower in Malaysia. On arrival in Malaysia, she finds that Ayah is not rich, and she has to struggle to care for the family, including six children. Lakshimi survives the horrors of World War II and the Japanese occupation of Malaya. Rani Manicka's work looks at the family members’ deep scars, including those which afflict the young generations.

== Touching Earth, second novel ==
Her second novel, Touching Earth, was published in 2005, followed by "The Japanese Lover", released in 2009.

The Publishers Weekly says of this work, in a review:

Bestseller Manicka (The Rice Mother) spins an epic tale of love, loss, and cosmic destiny in her gripping and eloquent third novel, set against the lush backdrop of Malaya throughout the political and cultural turmoil of the 20th century. Prophesied at birth to have a wealthy but disastrous marriage, Parvathi, a poor Ceylonese girl, is married to a powerful man who despises her; she survives life in his house by devoting herself to her children, to a kindly servant, and to Maya, a powerful healer. When Japanese soldiers invade during WWII, she experiences love and passion for the first time in the arms of a commanding officer named Hattori.

== The Japanese Lover, third novel ==
Her latest work titled "Black Jack" was published in 2013.
