= Jeremy Poolman =

British novelist, biographer and artist

Jeremy Poolman is a British novelist, biographer and artist. His first novel, Interesting Facts about the State of Arizona, won the 1997 Commonwealth Writers' Prize, best first book, UK.

He studied at University College School, and Oxford Brookes University. His work has appeared in The Guardian. He lives in Cornwall.

== Works ==
- Interesting Facts about the State of Arizona, Faber and Faber, 1996, ISBN 978-0-571-17614-4
- Audacity's Song, Faber and Faber, 1998, ISBN 978-0-571-19200-7
- My Kind of America, Bloomsbury, 2000, ISBN 978-0-7475-4767-9
- Skin, Bloomsbury, 2001, ISBN 978-0-7475-5344-1

Non-Fiction

- A Wounded Thing Must Hide: In Search of Libbie Custer, Bloomsbury, 2002, ISBN 978-1-58234-121-7
- Gypsy Jem Mace: Being One Man's Search for His Forgotten Famous Ancestor Andre Deutsch, 2008, ISBN 978-0-233-00225-5
- The Road of Bones: A Journey to the Dark Heart of Russia, Simon & Schuster, Limited, 2011, ISBN 978-1-84737-647-3
