= Paulo da Costa (writer) =

- Born: April 1965 (age 61); Luanda, Angola
- Occupation: Author
- Writing career
- Language: English and Portuguese
- Period: 1999 – present
- Genres: fiction, non-fiction, poetry
- Notable works: The Scent of a Lie, Beyond Bullfights and Ice Hockey, Trust the Bluer Skies : Meditations on Fatherhood
- Notable awards: Commonwealth Writers Prize – Caribbean & Canada Region First Book, James H. Gray Award for Short Nonfiction, W.O. Mitchell City of Calgary Book Prize, Canongate Short-Fiction Prize
- Website: www.paulodacosta.ca

Paulo da Costa, born in Angola and raised in Portugal, is a bilingual Canadian-Portuguese author, editor and translator living in Canada.

== Works ==
=== Fiction ===
- Scent of a Lie - 2002 - Caribbean & Canada Commonwealth Writers Prize Best First Book 2003, 2002 W.O. Mitchell City of Calgary Book Prize, 2001 Cannongate Prize - Scotland.
- O Perfume da Mentira - Livros Pé d'Orelha, 2012
- The Green and Purple Skin of The World - Freehand Books, 2013
- The Midwife of Torment & Other Stories, 55 sudden fictions – Guernica Editions, 2017

=== Non-Fiction ===
- Beyond Bullfights and Ice Hockey, Essays on Identity, Language and Writing Culture, Boavista Press, Paperback : 97809960511322015, 208 pages, April 2015
- Trust the Bluer Skies : Meditations on Fatherhood, University of Regina Press, Paperback : 9780889779921, 256 pages, March 2024

=== Poetry ===
- Notas-de-rodapé - Portuguese poems – Livros Pé d'Orelha, 2005

=== Literary translation ===
- The Cartography of Being – Translated poems of Nuno Júdice 1970-2005 LPO 2012

=== Audio chapbooks ===
- Notas-de-rodapé - Portuguese poems – Livros Pé d'Orelha 2005
- Midwife of Torment & Other Stories - Livros Pé d'Orelha 2005
- Twenty Poems – English Poems - Livros Pé d'Orelha – 2006
- XX poemas - Portuguese poems - Livros Pé d'Orelha - 2006
- The Book of Catalogues – Livros Pé d'Orelha - 2010

== Awards ==
- 2024 Outstanding Calgary Artist Award
- 2024 James H. Gray Award for Short Nonfiction
- 2023 James H. Gray Award for Short Nonfiction
- 2020 James H. Gray Award for Short Nonfiction
- 2003 Caribbean & Canada Region Commonwealth Writers Prize – First Book
- 2002 W.O. Mitchell City of Calgary Book Prize
- 2001 Canongate Short-Fiction Prize (Scotland)
- 1999 CBC Alberta Anthology – Short Story

Portuguese

- 2023 Prémio Alberto Bastos – Poesia (Poetry Prize – Portuguese)
- 2003 ProVerbo . Prémio – Poesia (Poetry Prize – Portuguese)
- 2003 ProVerbo . Prémio – Conto (Short-Story Prize – Portuguese)
