= Robert Antoni =

West Indian writer (born 1958)

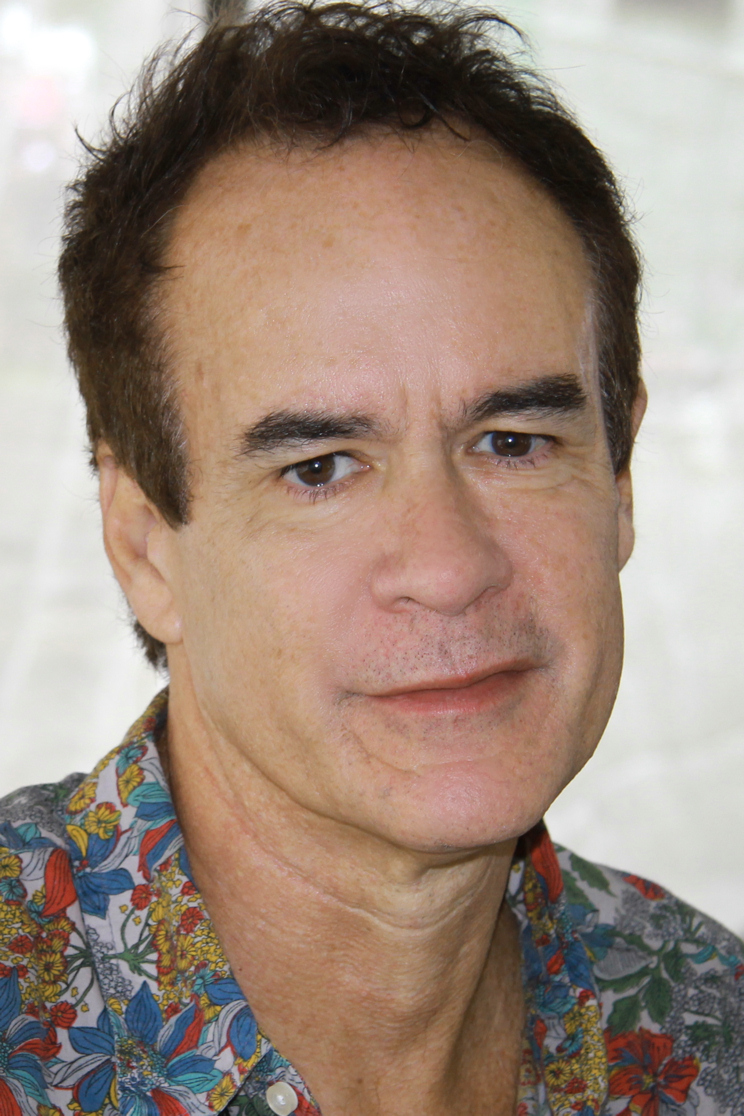
- Antoni at the 2013 Texas Book Festival
- Born: 1958 (age 67–68); Detroit, Michigan, .United States
- Education: Duke University; Johns Hopkins University; Iowa Writers' Workshop
- Occupation: Professor
- Writing career
- Genre: novel
- Notable works: Divina Trace (1991); As Flies to Whatless Boys (2013)
- Notable awards: Commonwealth Writers' Prize; OCM Bocas Prize for Caribbean Literature
- Website: robertantoni.com

Robert Antoni (born 1958) is a West Indian writer who was awarded the 1999 Aga Khan Prize for Fiction by The Paris Review for My Grandmother's Tale of How Crab-o Lost His Head. He was a Guggenheim Fellow for 2010 for his work on the historical novel As Flies to Whatless Boys, which went on to win the 2014 OCM Bocas Prize for Caribbean Literature.

== Early life ==
Robert Antoni was born in 1958, in Detroit, Michigan, in the United States ("by mistake"), to Trinidadian parents and grew up largely in the Bahamas, where his father practised medicine. He says his "fictional world" is "Corpus Christi", the invented island (based on Trinidad) that he introduced in his first novel, Divina Trace (1991).

Antoni studied at Duke University and in the creative writing programme at Johns Hopkins University, before joining the Iowa Writers' Workshop at the University of Iowa, where he began working on Divina Trace. He has said that he spent a total of ten years completing the novel, which won the Commonwealth Writers' Prize for best first novel in 1992.

== Career ==
Antoni lived for a time in Barcelona, Spain, and taught at the University of Miami from 1992 to 2001. In 2004, he began teaching at Barnard College, Columbia University and The New School. In 2010, he was a Guggenheim Fellow.

His novel As Flies to Whatless Boys was the overall winner of the 2014 OCM Bocas Prize for Caribbean Literature. At the award ceremony on 26 April, Antoni pledged to share the US$10,000 prize money with the other finalists, Lorna Goodison (winner of the poetry category for Oracabessa) and Kei Miller (winner of the literary non-fiction category for Writing Down the Vision: Essays and Prophecies). Kei Miller and Antoni were both featured presenters at the 2018 Key West Literary Seminar: Writers of the Caribbean.

Antoni resides in New York City, where he teaches literature at The New School for Public Engagement.

== Awards and honours ==
- 1992: Commonwealth Writers' Prize: Best First Book, Divina Trace
- 1999: Aga Khan Prize for Fiction from the Paris Review, for My Grandmother's Tale of How Crab-o Lost His Head
- 2010: Guggenheim Fellow for his work on the historical novel As Flies to Whatless Boys
- 2014: OCM Bocas Prize for Caribbean Literature (Fiction and overall winner), As Flies to Whatless Boys

== Bibliography ==
=== Novels ===
- Divina Trace, Robin Clark, 1991, ISBN 978-0-86072-136-9
- Blessed Is the Fruit, Henry Holt and Co., 1997, ISBN 978-0-8050-4925-1
- My Grandmother's Erotic Folktales, 2000; Grove Press, 2002, ISBN 978-0-8021-3900-9
- Carnival, Black Cat, 2005, ISBN 978-0-8021-7005-7
- As Flies to Whatless Boys. Akashic Books. 2013. pp. 154–. ISBN 978-1-61775-156-1.

=== Nonfiction ===
- 1998: "Another Day Under the Black Volcano" in Outside Magazine
- 1999: "Blackbeard Doesn't Come Here Anymore" in Outside Magazine
- 2001: "Party in the Islands" in Ocean Drive Magazine

=== Anthologies ===
- Robert Antoni, Bradford Morrow (eds), The Archipelago: New writing from and about the Caribbean, Bard College, 1996, ISBN 978-0-941964-43-2
- Co-editor with Earl Lovelace, Trinidad Noir: The Classics, Akashic Books, 2017, ISBN 978-1-61775-435-7.

== See also ==
- Caribbean literature
- Caribbean poetry
- Postcolonial literature
