= Marion Molteno =

South African writer

Marion Molteno (born 1944 in Bloemfontein) is a prize-winning novelist and writer, whose fiction draws inspiration from the cross-cultural range of her life experience. She left South Africa after being involved in student protests against the apartheid regime, lived in Zambia for eight years, and since 1977 has lived in London, where she worked with minority communities and asylum seekers. She was a policy adviser in Save the Children, supporting work with vulnerable children across the world. She edits the work of the Urdu scholar Ralph Russell.

== Novels ==
Uncertain Light (2015) was shortlisted for the International Indie Book Awards, 2016, and the International Rubery Book Awards 2017. Set partly in Central Asia in the aftermath of a civil war, it reflects the lives of people who work in international development and humanitarian crises. Alastair Niven, judge of the Man Booker Prize for 2014, described it as "a moving and necessary novel", and The Bookseller called it "a terrifically absorbing, topical and quietly affecting novel of interlocking worlds and relationships".

If You Can Walk, You Can Dance (1999) won the Commonwealth Writers Prize for the best book in the Africa region. In 2017 it was re-issued by Niyogi Books in India, where it was long-listed for the Atta Galatta Bangalore Literary Festival Prize. It follows a young woman fleeing from the threat of prison in South Africa, across countries and cultures, to find a new meaning for her life through music. The composer Diana Burrell called it "an exhilarating book that celebrates the power of music as universal language, healer, political tool - the thread that links humankind across cultures and continents". Boyd Tonkin, reviewer for The Independent, described it as "ambitious and gripping … an eloquent exploration of what music can mean in a life … handled with a zest that outshines most of this year's cacophony of musically-themed fictions."

Somewhere More Simple (2007) is set in the small-scale world of the Isles of Scilly, off the coast of Cornwall. It’s a story of newcomers to the islands, drawn to what seems a simpler life in a place blessed by nature and apparently cut off from mainland pressures; but their own complexities follow them. The New Zealand Sunday Herald called it ‘an intense, deeply personal novel … a muted, reflective meditation on the need for resolution.’ Radio Scilly’s reviewer said it was "a beautifully written and perceptive book about the complexities of love and life in an island setting … A story of love, desire, loss and forgiveness that I found very thought provoking and moving."

A Shield of Coolest Air (1992) won the David St John Thomas prize for fiction. It revolves around a friendship between two young mothers, one of whom is a Somali who has had to flee from a civil war but been unable to get all her children out with her. The Egyptian writer Nawal el Saadawi said it was "a beautiful piece of fiction, uncovering hidden realities." The Independent on Sunday reviewer said: "So successfully has Molteno breathed life into her characters that we get a real sense of their vulnerability, their fury, their sadness and their astonishing resilience."

== Stories ==
A Language in Common (1987) is a collection of short stories featuring South Asian women in the UK, first-generation immigrants who meet in English classes. The Pakistani writer Ahmed Rashid called it "The most extraordinary book of short stories – one of the first attempts to straddle in fiction the social divide between white Britons and Asians." It was reissued in 2000 by Addenda, New Zealand, where the New Zealand Herald described Molteno as "a lucid, unpretentious writer whose compassion and honesty shine through."

Two of her short stories have won prizes:

- "What was once a city", about working for Save the Children in war-torn Mogadishu, was awarded 1st prize in the Yeovil Literature Prize, 2017.
- "The Bracelets" (1995), about two mother-daughter relationships across cultures, won a London Short Story competition, and was included in “Well Sorted: The London Short Story Collection”.

"Tales I Tell My Grandchildren", a conversation with young children about contemporary refugee issues, was published in Knock Twice: 25 Modern Tales for Troubling Times (2017)

== Literary events ==
She is an experienced public speaker and has spoken about her writing to audiences across the UK, New Zealand, India and Pakistan.

== Urdu literature ==
She learnt Urdu from the Urdu scholar and translator, Ralph Russell, and worked with him for 26 years until his death in 2008. She is now his literary executor, brings out new editions of his work, and uses his translations to introduce Urdu literature to a wider audience, including at the Poetry Translation Centre and the Royal Asiatic Society in London.

New editions of Ralph Russell’s literary work, edited by her and with her introductions, are:

- A Thousand Yearnings: A Book of Urdu Poetry & Prose (2017)
- The Famous Ghalib: The Sound of My Moving Pen (2015)

She has published articles about his work in The Annual of Urdu Studies and elsewhere and edited his autobiography:

- Findings, Keepings, Part I (2001)
- Losses Gains, Part II (2010)

== Work in education ==
She has a degree in history from the University of Cape Town, a post-graduate qualification in teaching English from the University of Manchester, an MA in Modern Language Teaching from the Institute of Education, University of London, and studied Urdu at the School of Oriental and African Studies.

Over a long career in education she has taught from pre-school to adult education, trained teachers of history and languages, written books for teachers, developed new syllabuses in response to changes in society, organised English classes for adults new to Britain, and campaigned for the languages of the larger minority groups to be taught in UK schools. In response to an increase in the number of asylum seekers in Britain in the early 1990s she founded the South London Refugee Project.

She set up and continues to co-manage Our Lives Press, which publishes short autobiographies of people who have come to the UK as adults.

== Work in international development ==
She held senior policy posts in Save the Children, and travelled to over 30 countries to work with programme staff. As the organisation's first head-office based Education Advisor, she brought together the experience of education programmes across the world, to produce a series of books which were translated into a number of languages and widely used by practitioners.

Publications on education & international development include:

- Starting Young: Principles & Practice in Early Childhood Development (1996: Save the Children, ISBN 1899120300)
- A Chance in Life: Principles & Practice in Basic Primary Education for Children (1998: Save the Children, ISBN 1899120696)
- Working for Change in Education: A Handbook for Planning Advocacy, with Bill Bell, Vanessa Herringshaw, David Norman, Patrick Proctor (2000: Save the Children, ISBN 184187034X)
- Towards Responsive Schools: Supporting better schooling for disadvantaged children, with Kimberly Ogadhoh, Emma Cain, Bridget Crumpton (2000: Department for International Development, Education research papers, No.38). The Policy and Learning team that she headed was responsible for ensuring that the impact of the organisation's work was regularly evaluated, and was guided by its principles of child rights and inclusion.

== Personal ==
Her husband was Robert Molteno, former editor and director of Zed Books. They have two daughters, and she is an active grandmother.
