= Rajarajeswari Dental College and Hospital =

Dental college in Bangalore, India

- Other name: RRDCH
- Type: Private
- Established: 1992
- Chairman: A C Shanmugam
- Dean: Edwin Devdos
- Academic staff: 100+
- Undergraduates: 500+
- Postgraduates: 50+
- Location: Bangalore, Karnataka, 560060, India
- Campus: Urban
- Language: English
- Website: www.rrdch.org

Rajarajeswari Dental College and Hospital or RRDCH as commonly known, is a dental college in India. Affiliated to Rajiv Gandhi University of Health Sciences, Bangalore; this institution has various accreditations including that of HLAT International, International Accreditation Organization, National Assessment and Accreditation Council and is also awarded ISO 9001:2008 by BSICS and is recognised by Dental Council of India.

== History ==
In 2014, the Royal College of Physicians and Surgeons of Glasgow, selected RRDCH as the centre in India for part 1 and part 2 of MFDS. In 2015, RRDCH installed its own CBCT imaging unit.

== Academics ==
=== Academic programmes ===
==== Undergraduate courses ====
- BDS

==== Post graduate courses ====
- MDS

- Oral Medicine and Radiology
- Pediatric and Preventive Dentistry
- Oral and Maxillofacial Surgery
- Periodontology
- Orthodontics and Dentofacial Orthopaedics
- Conservative Dentistry and Endodontics
- Prosthodontics and Crown & Bridge
- Oral and Maxillofacial Pathology
- Public Health Dentistry

==== Phd ====
- Prosthetics and Crown and Bridge
- Periodontology
- Orthodontics and Orthodental Orthopedics

==== Certificate courses ====
- Implantology

=== Rankings ===
In 2014, the newspaper The Pioneer ranked the institution as one of the top private dental colleges in India.
