= Syl Cheney-Coker =

Sierra Leonean writer and journalist

Syl Cheney-Coker (born 28 June 1945) is a poet, novelist, and journalist from Freetown, Sierra Leone. Educated in the United States, he has a global sense of literary history, and has introduced styles and techniques from French and Latin American literatures to Sierra Leone. He has spent much of his life in exile from his native country, and has written extensively (in poetry, fiction, and non-fiction) about the condition of exile and the view of Africa from an African abroad.

== Early life and education ==
Cheney-Coker was born a Creole in Freetown, Sierra Leone, with the name Syl Cheney Coker, and changed his name to its current spelling in 1970. He went to the United States in 1966, where he attended the University of California, Los Angeles, the University of Oregon, and the University of Wisconsin–Madison. After his schooling he returned briefly to Sierra Leone, but accepted a position at the University of the Philippines in 1975; he later married a Filipino woman. He moved to Nigeria in 1977 to teach at the University of Maiduguri, and returned to the United States in 1988 to be Writer-in-Residence at the University of Iowa.

== Poetry ==
Cheney-Coker's poetry is tinged with the anxiety of his perennially uncertain status, dealing both with exile (he has spent the majority of his adult life outside of his country) and with the precariousness of living as an intellectual in Sierra Leone. At the same time, he is concerned always with how he will be read; his poems are radical and ardent, but also erudite and allusive, which can distract a reader from Cheney-Coker's ideological project. He has been called one of the more western-influenced African poets. In his "On Being a Poet in Sierra Leone" (from his The Graveyard Also Has Teeth, 1980) he writes:

at the university the professors talk about the poetry
of Syl Cheney-Coker condemning students
to read me in the English honours class
my country I do not want that!
do not want to be cloistered in books alone

== The Last Harmattan of Alusine Dunbar ==
After three collections of poetry, all well received in the west, Cheney-Coker wrote a novel, The Last Harmattan of Alusine Dunbar, which was published in 1990. The novel, extremely ambitious in scale and scope, describes the entire history of a fictional country, Malagueta, with roots in the Atlantic slave trade (similar to Sierra Leone or Liberia, both populated partly by former slaves). The novel is intended as a break with the tradition of the African novel and its dominant writers, Ngũgĩ wa Thiong'o and Chinua Achebe. To achieve this independence, it draws both on the peculiar histories of the post-slavery nations of northwest Africa and on literatures from outside of the continent. Cheney-Coker's interest in Gabriel García Márquez, in particular, has led some critics to consider the novel to belong to the genre of magical realism—the title character demonstrates mysterious powers similar to those of some of García Márquez's characters—though others have questioned that assumption. The Last Harmattan of Alusine Dunbar won the Commonwealth Writers' Prize (Africa Region) in 1991.

== Journalism and exile ==
In the early 1990s, Cheney-Coker returned to Freetown to become editor of a progressive newspaper, the Vanguard. After the military coup of 1997, Cheney-Coker was targeted as a dissident, and barely escaped with his life. In part through the efforts of Wole Soyinka, an exiled Nigerian poet teaching at the University of Nevada, Las Vegas, Cheney-Coker was invited to be the first writer in the City of Asylum program in Las Vegas, Nevada. He decided to return to a somewhat more stable Sierra Leone in 2003, saying, "After a while, exile is neither justifiable nor tolerable."

== Documentary ==
In 2016, Cheney-Coker, along with his lifelong friend, the Nigerian poet Niyi Osundare, was the subject of a documentary called The Poets, by director Chivas DeVinck. The film follows Cheney-Coker and Osundare on a road-trip through Sierra Leone and Nigeria as they discuss their friendship and how their life experiences have shaped their art.

== Books ==
- The Road to Jamaica. 1969.
- Concerto for an Exile: Poems. London: Heinemann, 1973.
- The Graveyard Also Has Teeth. London: Heinemann, 1980.
- The Blood in the Desert's Eyes: Poems. London: Heinemann, 1990.
- The Last Harmattan of Alusine Dunbar. London: Heinemann, 1990. ISBN 0-435-90572-4
- Jollof Boy: The Early Years. Freetown: Sierra Leonean Writers Series, 2025.
