= List of taluks of Karnataka =

terdal

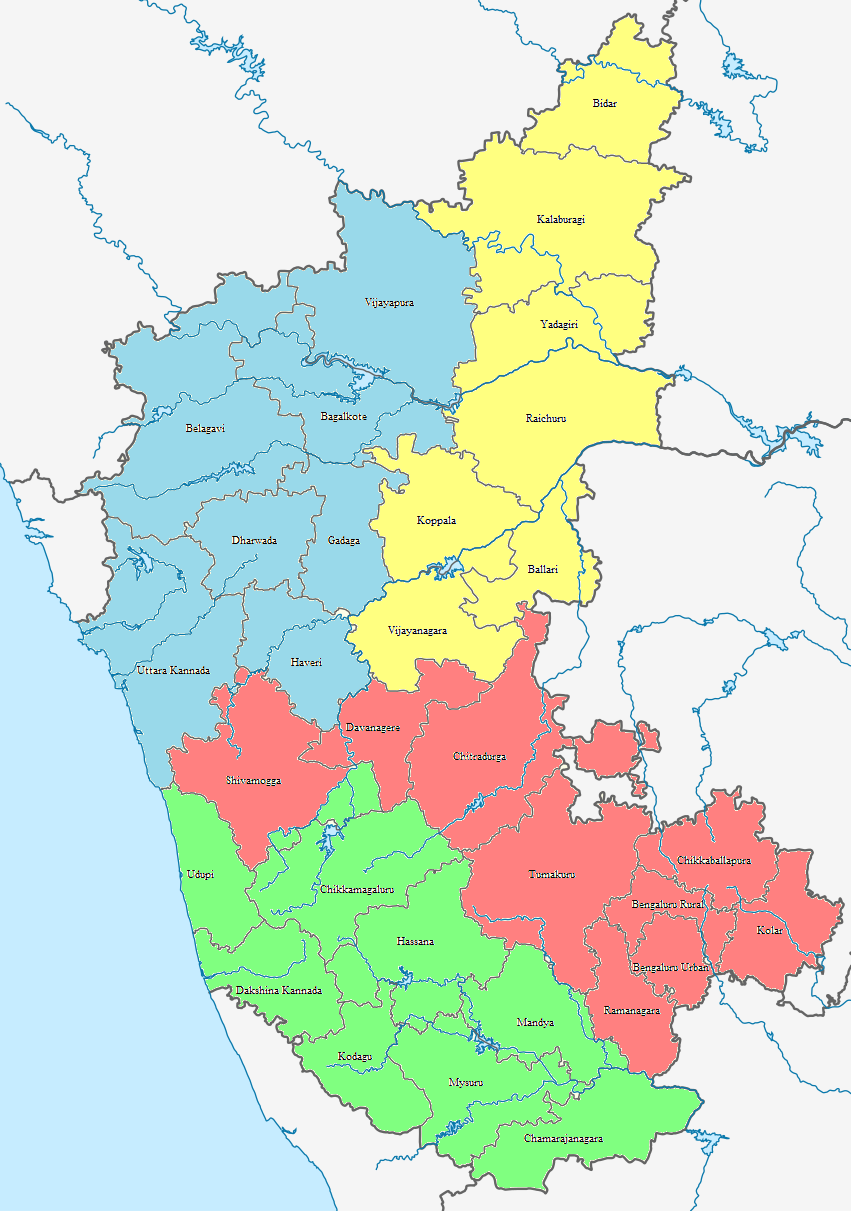
4 Divisions and 31 Districts of Karnataka

Karnataka has about 239 Talukas. The table below lists all the talukas in the state of Karnataka, India, by district. Each taluka is headed by a Tehsildar and comprises several hoblis, which are groups of villages. These talukas are constituted for land revenue and land administration purposes.

The urban status is listed for the headquarters town of the taluka, rural talukas are much larger. Urban status follows the census standard.

Level of each administration.

- City Corporation (Mahanagara Palike)
- City Municipal Council (Nagarasabe)
- Town Municipal Council (Purasabe)
- Town Panchayat (Pura Panchayiti)
- Village Panchayat (Grama Panchayiti)

== List of districts with corresponding talukas ==
District	Taluka	Urban status of taluka headquarters
1. Bagalkote	1. Bagalkote	City Municipal Council
1. Bagalkote	2. Terdal	City Municipal Council
1. Bagalkote	3. Mudhola	City Municipal Council
1. Bagalkote	4. Badami	Town Panchayat
1. Bagalkote	5. Bilagi	Town Panchayat
1. Bagalkote	6. Hunagunda	Town Panchayat
1. Bagalkote	7. Ilkal	City Municipal Council
1. Bagalkote	8. Rabkavi Banhatti	City Municipal Council
1. Bagalkote	9. Guledgudda	Town Municipal Council
1. Bagalkote	10. Jamkhangi	Town Municipal Council
2. Ballari	1. Ballari	City Corporation
2. Ballari	2. Kurugodu	Town Municipal Council
2. Ballari	3. Kampli	Town Municipal Council
2. Ballari	4. Sanduru	Town Municipal Council
2. Ballari	5. Siraguppa	City Municipal Council
3. Belagavi	1. Belagavi	City Corporation
3. Belagavi	2. Athani	Town Municipal Council
3. Belagavi	3. Bailhongal	Town Municipal Council
3. Belagavi	4. Chikkodi	Town Municipal Council
3. Belagavi	5. Gokak	City Municipal Council
3. Belagavi	6. Khanapura	Town Panchayat
3. Belagavi	7. Mudalgi	Town Municipal Council
3. Belagavi	8. Nippani	City Municipal Council
3. Belagavi	9. Rayabaga	Town Panchayat
3. Belagavi	10. Savadatti	Town Municipal Council
3. Belagavi	11. Ramadurga	Town Municipal Council
3. Belagavi	12. Kagawada	Town Panchayat
3. Belagavi	13. Hukkeri	Town Municipal Council
3. Belagavi	14. Kitturu	Town Panchayat
3. Belagavi	15. Yargatti	Town Panchayat
4. Bengaluru Urban	1. Bengaluru	City Corporation (Part of Bruhat Bengaluru Mahanagara Palike)
4. Bengaluru Urban	2. Kengeri	City Corporation (Part of Bruhat Bengaluru Mahanagara Palike)
4. Bengaluru Urban	3. Krishnarajapura	City Corporation (Part of Bruhat Bengaluru Mahanagara Palike)
4. Bengaluru Urban	4. Anekal	Town Municipal Council
4. Bengaluru Urban	5. Yelahanka	City Corporation (Part of Bruhat Bengaluru Mahanagara Palike)
5. Bengaluru Rural	1. Nelamangala	Town Municipal Council
5. Bengaluru Rural	2. Doddaballapura	City Municipal Council
5. Bengaluru Rural	3. Devanahalli	Town Municipal Council
5. Bengaluru Rural	4. Hosakote	City Municipal Council
6. Bidar	1. Aurad	City Municipal Council
6. Bidar	2. Basavakalyana	City Municipal Council
6. Bidar	3. Bhalki	City Municipal Council
6. Bidar	4. Bidar	City Municipal Council
6. Bidar	5. Chitgoppa	Town Municipal Council
6. Bidar	6. Hulsuru	Town Municipal Council
6. Bidar	7. Humnabad	City Municipal Council
6. Bidar	8. Kamalanagara	Town Municipal Council
7. Chamarajanagara	1. Chamarajanagara	City Municipal Council
7. Chamarajanagara	2. Gundlupete	Town Municipal Council
7. Chamarajanagara	3. Kollegala	City Municipal Council
7. Chamarajanagara	4. Yelanduru	Town Panchayat
7. Chamarajanagara	5. Hanuru	Town Panchayat
8. Chikkaballapura	1. Chikkaballapura	City Municipal Council
8. Chikkaballapura	2. Bagepalli	Town Municipal Council
8. Chikkaballapura	3. Chintamani	City Municipal Council
8. Chikkaballapura	4. Gauribidanuru	City Municipal Council
8. Chikkaballapura	5. Gudibanda	Town Municipal Council
8. Chikkaballapura	6. Sidlaghatta	Town Municipal Council
8. Chikkaballapura	7. Cheluru	Village Panchayat
8. Chikkaballapura	8. Manchenahalli	Village Panchayat
9. Chikkmagaluru	1. Chikkamagaluru	City Municipal Council
9. Chikkmagaluru	2. Kaduru	Town Municipal Council
9. Chikkmagaluru	3. Koppa	Town Panchayat
9. Chikkmagaluru	4. Mudigere	Town Panchayat
9. Chikkmagaluru	5. Narasimharajapura	Town Panchayat
9. Chikkmagaluru	6. Sringeri	Town Panchayat
9. Chikkmagaluru	7. Tarikere	Town Municipal Council
9. Chikkmagaluru	8. Ajjampura	Town Panchayat
9. Chikkmagaluru	9. Kalasa	Village Panchayat
10. Chitradurga	1. Chitradurga	City Municipal Council
10. Chitradurga	2. Challakere	City Municipal Council
10. Chitradurga	3. Hiriyur	City Municipal Council
10. Chitradurga	4. Holalkere	Town Panchayat
10. Chitradurga	5. Hosadurga	Town Municipal Council
10. Chitradurga	6. Molakalmuru	Town Panchayat
11. Dakshina Kannada	1. Mangaluru	City Corporation
11. Dakshina Kannada	2. Ullal	City Municipal Council
11. Dakshina Kannada	3. Mulki	Town Panchayat
11. Dakshina Kannada	4. Moodbidri	Town Municipal Council
11. Dakshina Kannada	5. Bantwala	Town Municipal Council
11. Dakshina Kannada	6. Belathangadi	Town Panchayat
11. Dakshina Kannada	7. Putturu	City Municipal Council
11. Dakshina Kannada	8. Sulya	Town Panchayat
11. Dakshina Kannada	9. Kadaba	Town Panchayat
12. Davanagere	1. Davanagere	City Corporation
12. Davanagere	2. Harihara	City Municipal Council
12. Davanagere	3. Channagiri	Town Municipal Council
12. Davanagere	4. Honnali	Town Municipal Council
12. Davanagere	5. Nyamathi	Town Panchayat
12. Davanagere	6. Jagaluru	Town Panchayat
13. Dharwad	1. Kalghatgi	Town Panchayat
13. Dharwad	2. Dharwad	City Corporation (Part of Hubballi-Dharwad Mahanagara Palike)
13. Dharwad	3. Hubballi (Rural)	City Corporation (Part of Hubballi-Dharwad Mahanagara Palike)
13. Dharwad	4. Hubballi (Urban)	City Corporation (Part of Hubballi-Dharwad Mahanagara Palike)
13. Dharwad	5. Kundagolu	Town Municipal Council
13. Dharwad	6. Navalgunda	Town Municipal Council
13. Dharwad	7. Alnavara	Town Panchayat
13. Dharwad	8. Annigeri	Town Panchayat
14. Gadag	1. Gadag	City Municipal Council
14. Gadag	2. Naragunda	Town Municipal Council
14. Gadag	3. Mundaragi	Town Panchayat
14. Gadag	4. Rona	Town Panchayat
14. Gadag	5. Gajendragada	Town Municipal Council
14. Gadag	6. Lakshmeshwara	Town Municipal Council
14. Gadag	7. Shirahatti	Town Panchayat
15. Hassan	1. Hassan	City Municipal Council
15. Hassan	2. Arasikere	City Municipal Council
15. Hassan	3. Channarayapattana	Town Municipal Council
15. Hassan	4. Holenarsipura	Town Municipal Council
15. Hassan	5. Sakleshpura	Town Municipal Council
15. Hassan	6. Aluru	Town Panchayat
15. Hassan	7. Arakalagudu	Town Panchayat
15. Hassan	8. Beluru	Town Municipal Council
16. Haveri	1. Ranibennur	City Municipal Council
16. Haveri	2. Byadgi	Town Municipal Council
16. Haveri	3. Hangala	Town Municipal Council
16. Haveri	4. Haveri	City Municipal Council
16. Haveri	5. Savanuru	Town Municipal Council
16. Haveri	6. Hirekeruru	Town Panchayat
16. Haveri	7. Shiggavi	Town Municipal Council
16. Haveri	8. Rattihalli	Town Municipal Council
17. Kalaburagi	1. Kalaburagi	City Corporation
17. Kalaburagi	2. Afzalpura	Town Panchayat
17. Kalaburagi	3. Alanda	Town Municipal Council
17. Kalaburagi	4. Chincholi	Town Panchayat
17. Kalaburagi	5. Chitapura	Town Municipal Council
17. Kalaburagi	6. Jevargi	Town Panchayat
17. Kalaburagi	7. Sedam	Town Municipal Council
17. Kalaburagi	8. Kamalapura	Town Panchayat
17. Kalaburagi	9. Shahabad	City Municipal Council
17. Kalaburagi	10. Kalgi	Town Panchayat
17. Kalaburagi	11. Yedrami	Town Panchayat
18. Kodagu	1. Madikeri	City Municipal Council
18. Kodagu	2. Somawarapete	Town Panchayat
18. Kodagu	3. Virajapete	Town Municipal Council
18. Kodagu	4. Ponnammapete	Village Panchayat
18. Kodagu	5. Kushalnagara	Town Panchayat
19. Kolar	1. Kolar	City Municipal Council
19. Kolar	2. Bangarapete	Town Municipal Council
19. Kolar	3. Maluru	Town Municipal Council
19. Kolar	4. Mulabagilu	Town Municipal Council
19. Kolar	5. Srinivasapura	Town Municipal council
19. Kolar	6. Kolar Gold Fields (Robertsonpete)	Town Municipal Council
20. Koppala	1. Koppala	City Municipal Council
20. Koppala	2. Gangavathi	City Municipal Council
20. Koppala	3. Kushtagi	Town Municipal Council
20. Koppala	4. Yelaburga	Town Panchayat
20. Koppala	5. Kanakagiri	Town Panchayat
20. Koppala	6. Karatagi	Town Municipal Council
20. Koppala	7. Kukanuru	Town Panchayat
21. Mandya	1. Mandya	City Municipal Council
21. Mandya	2. Madduru	Town Municipal Council
21. Mandya	3. Malavalli	Town Municipal Council
21. Mandya	4. Srirangapattana	Town Municipal Council
21. Mandya	5. Krishnarajapete	Town Panchayat
21. Mandya	6. Nagamangala	Town Panchayat
21. Mandya	7. Pandavapura	Town Panchayat
22. Mysuru	1. Mysuru	City Corporation
22. Mysuru	2. Hunasuru	City Municipal Council
22. Mysuru	3. Krishnarajanagara	Town Municipal Council
22. Mysuru	4. Nanjanagodu	City Municipal Council
22. Mysuru	5. Heggadadevanakote	Town Municipal Council
22. Mysuru	6. Piriyapattana	Town Municipal Council
22. Mysuru	7. Tirumakudalu Narasipura	Town Municipal Council
22. Mysuru	8. Saraguru	Town Panchayat
22. Mysuru	9. Saligrama	Village Panchayat
23. Raichuru	1. Raichuru	City Municipal Council
23. Raichuru	2. Sindhanuru	City Municipal Council
23. Raichuru	3. Manvi	Town Municipal Council
23. Raichuru	4. Devadurga	Town Municipal Council
23. Raichuru	5. Lingasaguru	Town Municipal Council
23. Raichuru	6. Mudgal	Town Municipal Council
23. Raichuru	7. Maski	Town Municipal Council
23. Raichuru	8. Sirawara	Town Panchayat
24. Ramanagara	1. Ramanagara	City Municipal Council
24. Ramanagara	2. Magadi	Town Municipal Council
24. Ramanagara	3. Kanakapura	City Municipal Council
24. Ramanagara	4. Channapattana	City Municipal Council
24. Ramanagara	5. Harohalli	Town Municipal Council
25. Shivamogga	1. Shivamogga	City Corporation
25. Shivamogga	2. Sagara	City Municipal Council
25. Shivamogga	3. Bhadravathi	City Municipal Council
25. Shivamogga	4. Hosanagara	Town Panchayat
25. Shivamogga	5. Shikaripura	Town Municipal Council
25. Shivamogga	6. Soraba	Town Municipal Council
25. Shivamogga	7. Tirthahalli	Town Panchayat
26. Tumakuru	1. Tumakuru	City Corporation
26. Tumakuru	2. Chikkanayakanahalli	Town Municipal Council
26. Tumakuru	3. Kunigal	Town Municipal Council
26. Tumakuru	4. Madhugiri	Town Municipal Council
26. Tumakuru	5. Sira	City Municipal Council
26. Tumakuru	6. Tipturu	City Municipal Council
26. Tumakuru	7. Gubbi	Town Panchayat
26. Tumakuru	8. Koratagere	Town Panchayat
26. Tumakuru	9. Pavagada	Town Panchayat
26. Tumakuru	10. Turuvekere	Town Panchayat
27. Udupi	1. Udupi	City Municipal Council
27. Udupi	2. Kapu	Town Municipal Council
27. Udupi	3. Bynduru	Town Panchayat
27. Udupi	4. Karkala	Town Municipal Council
27. Udupi	5. Kundapura	Town Municipal Council
27. Udupi	6. Hebri	Village Panchayat
27. Udupi	7. Brahmavara	Village Panchayat
28. Uttara Kannada	1.Karwara	City Municipal Council
28. Uttara Kannada	2. Sirsi	City Municipal Council
28. Uttara Kannada	3. Joida	Town Panchayat
28. Uttara Kannada	4. Dandeli	City Municipal Council
28. Uttara Kannada	5. Bhatkal	Town Municipal Council
28. Uttara Kannada	6. Kumta	Town Municipal Council
28. Uttara Kannada	7. Ankola	Town Panchayat
28. Uttara Kannada	8. Haliyal	Town Panchayat
28. Uttara Kannada	9. Honnavara	Town Panchayat
28. Uttara Kannada	10. Mundagodu	Town Panchayat
28. Uttara Kannada	11. Siddapura	Town Panchayat
28. Uttara Kannada	12. Yellapura	Town Panchayat
29.Vijayapura	1.Vijayapura	City Corporation
29.Vijayapura	2. Indi	City Municipal Council
29.Vijayapura	3. Basavana Bagewadi	Town Municipal Council
29.Vijayapura	4. Sindgi	Town Municipal Council
29.Vijayapura	5. Muddebihala	Town Municipal Council
29.Vijayapura	6. Talikote	Town Municipal Council
29.Vijayapura	7. Devara Hipparagi	Town Panchayat
29.Vijayapura	8. Chadchana	Town Panchayat
29.Vijayapura	9. Tikote	Village Panchayat
29.Vijayapura	10. Babaleshwara	Town Panchayat
29.Vijayapura	11. Kolhara	Town Panchayat
29.Vijayapura	12. Nidagundi	Town Panchayat
29.Vijayapura	13. Alamela	Town Panchayat
30. Yadagiri	1. Yadagiri	City Municipal Council
30. Yadagiri	2. Shahapura	City Municipal Council
30. Yadagiri	3. Surapura	Town Municipal Council
30. Yadagiri	4. Gurmitkala	Town Panchayat
30. Yadagiri	5. Vadagera	Town Panchayat
30. Yadagiri	6. Hunsagi	Town Panchayat
31. Vijayanagara	1. Hosapete	City Municipal Council
31. Vijayanagara	2. Hagaribommanahalli	Town Municipal Council
31. Vijayanagara	3. Harapanahalli	Town Municipal Council
31. Vijayanagara	4. Hoovina Hadagali	Town Municipal Council
31. Vijayanagara	5. Kudligi	Town Municipal Council
31. Vijayanagara	6. Kotturu	Town Panchayat
