= Advi Hulagabal =

- village
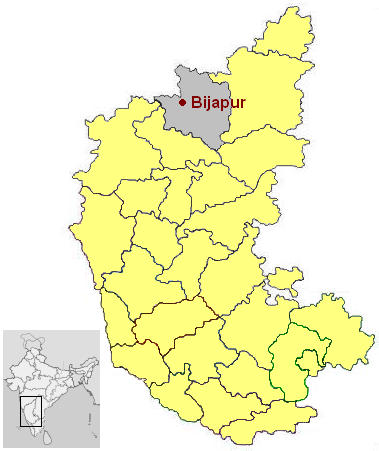
- Advi Hulagabal is in Bijapur district
- Interactive map of Advi Hulagabal
- Coordinates: 16.3367°N 76.2648°E
- Country: India
- State: Karnataka
- District: Bijapur
- Talukas: Muddebihal

Government
  - Body: Village Panchayat

Languages
  - Official: Kannada
- Time zone: UTC+5:30 (IST)
- Vehicle registration: KA
- Nearest city: Bijapur
- Civic agency: Village Panchayat
- Website: karnataka.gov.in

Advi Hulagabal is a village in the southern state of Karnataka, India. It is located in the Muddebihal taluk of Bijapur district in Karnataka.

== See also ==
- Bijapur district
- Districts of Karnataka
