= Nalatawad =

- village
- Location in Karnataka, India Nalatawad (India)
- Coordinates: 16.34°N 76.14°E
- Country: India
- State: Karnataka
- District: Vijayapura
- Talukas: Muddebihal

Population (2001)
  - Total: 13,558

Languages
  - Official: Kannada
- Time zone: UTC+5:30 (IST)

Nalatawad is a village in the northern state of Karnataka, India. It is located in the Muddebihal taluk of Bijapur district in Karnataka.

== Demographics ==
As of the 2001 Indian census, Nalatawad had a population of 13558 with 6918 males and 6640 females.

== See also ==
- Muddebihal
- Districts of Karnataka
