= Chandkavathe =

- village
- Location in Karnataka, India Chandkavathe (India)
- Coordinates: 16.92°N 76.24°E
- Country: India
- State: Karnataka
- District: Bijapur
- Talukas: Sindgi

Population (2001)
  - Total: 5,434

Languages
  - Official: Kannada
- Time zone: UTC+5:30 (IST)

Chandkavathe is a village in the Northern part of Karnataka, India. It is located in the Sindgi taluk of Bijapur district in Karnataka.

== Demographics ==
As of 2001 India census, Chandkavathe had a population of 5434 with 2820 males and 2614 females. Population has increased over the years along with total village area. Many new houses have come up in the area which is informally called as "Hosa ooru".

== About the Village ==
It is one of the bigger villages in Sindagi taluk. It has educational facility beyond 10th standard. There are many temples. many festivals are celebrated throughout the year, major ones being, Basavanna jaatre for nine days, Paramananda jaatre, choddamma jaatre, Many people attend the Ganesha festival of revanasiddha temple

Paramananda temple is around 2.5 km outside of village. Newly built entrance was opened in Apr 2013.

== See also ==
- Bijapur
- Districts of Karnataka
