= Advi Somnal =

- village
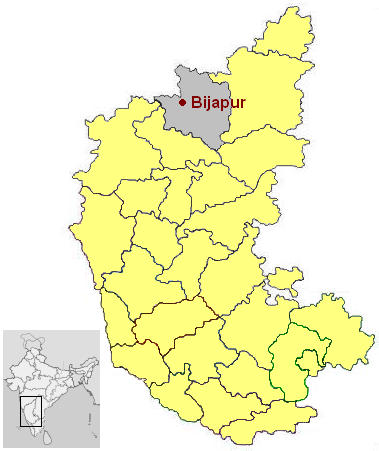
- Advi Somnal is in Bijapur district
- Interactive map of Advi Somnal
- Coordinates: 16.344°N 76.2847°E
- Country: India
- State: Karnataka
- District: Bijapur
- Talukas: Muddebihal

Government
  - Body: Village Panchayat

Languages
  - Official: Kannada
- Time zone: UTC+5:30 (IST)
- Vehicle registration: KA
- Nearest city: Bijapur
- Civic agency: Village Panchayat
- Website: karnataka.gov.in

Advi Somnal is a village in the southern state of Karnataka, India. It is located in the Muddebihal taluk of Bijapur district in Karnataka.

== See also ==
- Bijapur district
- Districts of Karnataka
- Adavi somanal is called as Sharan Somanal this village is located near Huvin hipparagi, Because of Shree Sharan Basavalingappa sharan this village name is called as Sharan somanal and Shree Sharan Basavalingappa Temple is located at this village
