= Yarazari =

Coordinates: 16°19′N 76°04′E

Yarazari ಯಲ್ಲಾಲಿಂಗ ನಗರ ಯಾರಝರಿ
- village
- Location in Karnataka, India Yarazari (India)
- Country: India
- State: Karnataka
- District: Vijayapura
- Talukas: Muddebihal

Languages
  - Official: Kannada
- Time zone: UTC+5:30 (IST)

Yarazari is a village in Muddebihal taluk of Bijapur district in Karnataka state. It is 8 kilometres (5.0 mi) from Muddebihal and can be reached by state road transport buses and autorickshaw. The nearest towns are Muddebihal, Nidagundi, Basavana Bagewadi, Talikoti, Vijapur and Bagalkot. Almatti Railway station is 27 kilometres (17 mi) from Yarazari.

Yarazari has a mata called Yallalingeshwar Mata and Dhyamavva (Durga Devi) temple.

== Rahul Yarazari ==
Its mainly a flat land with black and red soil, most of the land is well irrigated because of Krishna river left branch water canal. farming is the main source of income. The main vegetation are jawar, sunflower, wheat, maze, ground nuts and many oil seeds.
