= Jalwad =

Jalawad
- village
- Location in Karnataka, India Jalawad (India)
- Coordinates: 16.92°N 76.24°E
- Country: India
- State: Karnataka
- District: Bijapur
- Named for: shivakumar
- Talukas: Sindgi

Government
  - Type: ma

Population (2011)
  - Total: 12,000

Languages
  - Official: Kannada
- Time zone: UTC+5:30 (IST)
- Postal code: 586120
- Vehicle registration: KA 28

Jalwad is a village in the southern state of Karnataka, India. It is located in the Sindgi taluk of Bijapur district in Karnataka.

== Demographics ==
As of 2001 India census, Jalwad had a population of 5224 with 2591 males and 2633 females.

== See also ==
- Districts of Karnataka
