= Devangaon =

- village
- Location in Karnataka, India Devangaon (India)
- Coordinates: 16.92°N 76.24°E
- Country: India
- State: Karnataka
- District: Bijapur
- Talukas: Sindgi

Population (2001)
  - Total: 5,380

Languages
  - Official: Kannada
- Time zone: UTC+5:30 (IST)

Devangaon is a village in the southern state of Karnataka, India. It is located in the Sindgi taluk of Bijapur district in Karnataka.

== Demographics ==
As of 2001 India census, Devangaon had a population of 5380 with 2704 males and 2676 females.

== See also ==
- Bijapur district
- Districts of Karnataka
