= Kannolli =

- village
- Location in Karnataka, India Kannolli (India)
- Coordinates: 16.92°N 76.24°E
- Country: India
- State: Karnataka
- District: Bijapur
- Talukas: Sindgi

Government
  - Type: Panchayat raj
  - Body: Gram panchayat

Population (2001)
  - Total: 5,357

Languages
  - Official: Kannada
- Time zone: UTC+5:30 (IST)
- ISO 3166 code: IN-KA
- Vehicle registration: KA
- Website: karnataka.gov.in

Kannolli is a village in the southern state of Karnataka, India. It is located in the Sindgi taluk of Bijapur district in Karnataka.

== Demographics ==
As of 2001 India census, Kannolli had a population of 5357 with 2757 males and 2600 females.

== See also ==
- Bijapur district
- Districts of Karnataka
