= Moratgi =

- village
- Location in Karnataka, India Moratgi (India)
- Coordinates: 16.92°N 76.24°E
- Country: India
- State: Karnataka
- District: Bijapur
- Talukas: Almel

Population (2001)
  - Total: 5,403

Languages
  - Official: Kannada
- Time zone: UTC+5:30 (IST)

Moratgi is a village in the southern state of Karnataka, India. It is located in the Sindgi taluk of Bijapur district in Karnataka.

== Demographics ==
As of 2001 India census, Moratgi had a population of 5403 with 2760 males and 2643 females.

== See also ==
- Bijapur district
- Districts of Karnataka
