= Balaganur =

- village
- Location in Karnataka, India Balaganur (India)
- Coordinates: 16.92°N 76.24°E
- Country: India
- State: Karnataka
- District: Bijapur
- Talukas: Sindgi

Government
  - Body: Gram panchayat

Population (2001)
  - Total: 5,780

Languages
  - Official: Kannada
- Time zone: UTC+5:30 (IST)

Balaganur is a village in the southern state of Karnataka, India. It is located in the Sindgi taluk of Bijapur district in Karnataka.

== Demographics ==
According to the 2001 India census, Balaganur had a population of 5780 with 2978 males and 2802 females.

== See also ==
- Bijapur
- Districts of Karnataka
