= Yankanchi =

- Village
- Location in Karnataka, India Yankanchi (India)
- Coordinates: 16.92°N 76.24°E
- Country: India
- State: Karnataka
- District: Bijapur
- Talukas: Sindgi

Government
  - Type: Panchayat raj
  - Body: Gram panchayat

Population (2001)
  - Total: 5,307

Languages
  - Official: Kannada
- Time zone: UTC+5:30 (IST)
- ISO 3166 code: IN-KA
- Vehicle registration: KA
- Website: karnataka.gov.in

Yankanchi is a village in the southern state of Karnataka, India. It is located in the Sindgi taluk of Bijapur district in Karnataka.

== Demographics ==
As of 2001 India census, Yankanchi had a population of 5307 with 2707 males and 2600 females. It has a historic Background yankanchi was ruled by the chalukys of kalyani.and it has the many temples like Ishwar temple, Dawalamalika temple, Basaveshwar temple, Maragamma Temple, Ishwar Temple is said to be built by the chalukys of Kalyani. Dawalamalika Temple attracts many devotee every year. Here is a School named Smt. Parvatamma Kerudi Kannada Medium Pvt. School with good campus and good environment which is working for the good education of this village children since 2000.

== See also ==
- Bijapur district
- Districts of Karnataka
