= Algur =

Coordinates: 16°42′N 76°22′E

- village
- Location in Karnataka, India Algur (Karnataka)
- Country: India
- State: Karnataka
- District: Bijapur

Population (2011)
  - Total: 4,110

Languages
  - Official: Kannada
- Time zone: UTC+5:30 (IST)

Algur is a village in the southern state of Karnataka, India. It is located in the Sindgi taluk of Bijapur district.

== Demography ==
In the 2011 census, Algur had 800 families with a population of 4,110, consisting of 2,069 males and 2,041 females. The population of children aged 0–6 was 638, making up 15.52% of the total population of the village. The average sex ratio was 986 out of 1000, which is higher than the state average of 973 out of 1000. The child sex ratio in the village was 973 out of 1000, which is higher than the average of 948 out of 1000 in the state of Karnataka.
