= Dhumakanal =

- village
- Location in Karnataka, India Dhumakanal (India)
- Coordinates: 17°12′38″N 75°44′16″E
- Country: India
- State: Karnataka
- District: Bijapur district, Karnataka
- Talukas: Indi, Karnataka

Population (2010)
  - Total: 1,500
  - Density: 200/km^{2} (520/sq mi)

Languages
  - Official: Kannada
- Time zone: UTC+5:30 (IST)
- Vehicle registration: KA-28
- Nearest city: Chadchan, Karnataka
- Sex ratio: 60:40 ♂/♀
- Literacy: 70%
- Lok Sabha constituency: Bijapur
- Vidhan Sabha constituency: Nagathan
- Climate: hot and cold (Köppen)
- Website: www.dhumakanal.com

Dhumakanal is a village in the southern state of Karnataka, India. It is located in Indi taluk of Bijapur district, Karnataka. It is nearly 50 km from district headquarters, Bijapur. Its one of the small villages near to Chadchan town; Dhumakanal lies 20 km by road south-east of Chadchan.

== Demographics ==
In the 2001 India census, Dhumakanal had a population of 866, with 459 males and 407 females.

In the 2011 census Dhumakanal reported a population of 1,212.

== Agriculture ==
Total land of village has more than 80% fertile and cropping area. The village mainly grows sugar cane, grape, maize, sorghum, pearl millet and small area of lemon, onion, turmeric etc. Irrigation is mainly based upon bore-wells and wells.

== Education ==
In village there is a Government Higher Primary School currently working with 1st to 8th standard having more than 150 students. The whole village have more than 70% of literacy.

== Trusts ==
In village there are some associations doing cultural, sports programmes and other activities.
