= Tajapur (H) =

- village
- Location in Karnataka, India Tajapur (H) (India)
- Coordinates: 16.83°N 75.73°E
- Country: India
- State: Karnataka
- District: Bijapur district
- Talukas: Bijapur

Population (2001)
  - Total: 5,907

Languages
  - Official: Kannada
- Time zone: UTC+5:30 (IST)

Tajapur (H) is a village in the southern state of Karnataka, India. It is located in the Bijapur taluk of Bijapur district in Karnataka.

== Demographics ==
As of 2001 India census, Tajapur (H) had a population of 5907 with 3064 males and 2843 females.

== See also ==
- Bijapur district, Karnataka
- Districts of Karnataka
