= Korwar, Devar Hippargi =

Korwar
- Village
- Location in Karnataka, India Korwar (India)
- Coordinates: 16.92°N 76.24°E
- Country: India
- State: Karnataka
- District: Bijapur
- Talukas: Sindagi

Government
  - Body: Gram panchayat

Population (2001)
  - Total: 7,154

Languages
  - Official: Kannada
- Time zone: UTC+5:30 (IST)
- ISO 3166 code: IN-KA
- Vehicle registration: KA
- Website: korwar.com

Korwar is a village in the southern state of Karnataka, India. Sri Ksethra Korwar was initially called Kokilapur. It is located in the Devar Hippargi taluk of Bijapurdistrict in Karnataka. It is famous for Lord Hanuman temple, called as Korawareshwara. It comes under Korwar Panchayath. It belongs to Belgaum Division. It is located 64 km towards East from District headquarters Bijapur and 541 km from state capital Bangalore. Korwar Pin code is 586120 and postal head office is Korwar. Kannada is the Local Language here.

== Demographics ==
As of 2001 India census, Korwar had a population of 7154 with 3651 males and 3504 females.

== Lord Korawaresha ==
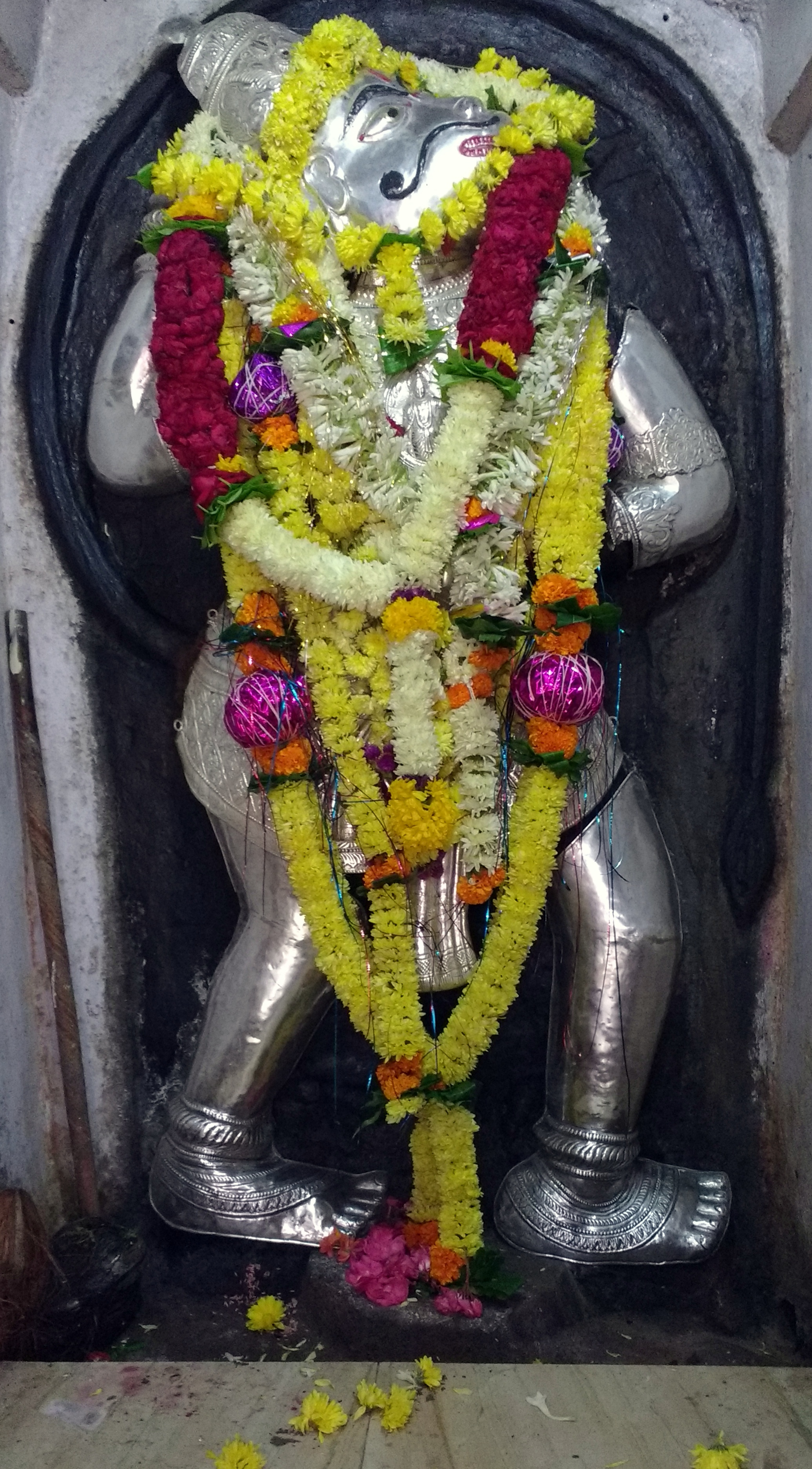
Lord Korawaresha

The Korwaresha Vigraha (statue) is consecrated by Sri Sri 1008 Sri Vadiraj Teerth from Sonde Math in the year 1535. It is said that Lord Korwaresha himself asked to establish the vigraha in this village. The vigraha is like shaligram and it is of 5 ft in height. The vigraha is having left hand above the waist and blessing the devotees with right hand. Eye, ear, shoulder, hand, the feet are clearly visible. Every year from Ugadi festival to Hanuma Jayantii special pooja programs will be celebrated in this temple. Every Saturday Pallakki Seva is done from palaki katti, Hanumad Vrata, Kartika Samaradhane, Madhvanavami and many more pooja will be celebrated by the devotees.

== See also ==
- Bijapur district
- Districts of Karnataka
