= Wandal, Sindagi =

Wandal
- village
- Location in Karnataka, India
- Coordinates: 16.745268399698148°N 76.35407455179194°E
- Country: India
- State: Karnataka
- District: Bijapur
- Taluks: Sindagi

Government
  - Body: Village Panchayat

Population (2011)
  - Total: 1,588

Languages
  - Official: Kannada
- Time zone: UTC+5:30 (IST)
- Nearest city: Bijapur
- Civic agency: Village Panchayat

Wandal is a village in the southern state of Karnataka, India. It is located in Sindagi Taluk of Bijapur.

== Demographics ==
=== 2011 ===
Total Number of HouseHold : 269
Population	Persons	Males	Females
Total	1,588	798	790
In the age group 0–6 years	195	109	86
Scheduled Castes (SC)	276	135	141
Scheduled Tribes (ST)	4	0	4
Literates	844	479	365
Illiterate	744	319	425
Total Worker	825	454	371
Main Worker	716	435	281
Main Worker - Cultivator	150	133	17
Main Worker - Agricultural Labourers	464	215	249
Main Worker - Household Industries	2	2	0
Main Worker - Other	100	85	15
Marginal Worker	109	19	90
Marginal Worker - Cultivator	3	0	3
Marginal Worker - Agriculture Labourers	102	18	84
Marginal Worker - Household Industries	2	0	2
Marginal Workers - Other	2	1	1
Marginal Worker (3-6 Months)	109	19	90
Marginal Worker - Cultivator (3-6 Months)	3	0	3
Marginal Worker - Agriculture Labourers (3-6 Months)	102	18	84
Marginal Worker - Household Industries (3-6 Months)	2	0	2
Marginal Worker - Other (3-6 Months)	2	1	1
Marginal Worker (0-3 Months)	0	0	0
Marginal Worker - Cultivator (0-3 Months)	0	0	0
Marginal Worker - Agriculture Labourers (0-3 Months)	0	0	0
Marginal Worker - Household Industries (0-3 Months)	0	0	0
Marginal Worker - Other Workers (0-3 Months)	0	0	0
Non Worker	763	344	419
