= Garasangi =

- village
- Location in Karnataka, India Garasangi (India)
- Coordinates: 16.488°N 75.694°E
- Country: India
- State: Karnataka
- District: Bijapur

Government
  - Type: Panchayat raj
  - Body: Gram panchayat

Languages
  - Official: Kannada
- Time zone: UTC+5:30 (IST)
- ISO 3166 code: IN-KA
- Vehicle registration: KA
- Website: karnataka.gov.in

Garasangi is a small hamlet in the district of Bijapur of Karnataka state of India. It is adivided by a small stream, so the two sides are called Hire (large/New) Garasangi and Chikk (small/Old) Garasangi.
