= Devara Hipparagi =

- Town
- Location in Karnataka, India
- Coordinates: 16.92°N 76.23°E
- Country: India
- State: Karnataka
- District: Bijapur
- Taluk: Devara Hipparagi
- Elevation: 500 m (1,600 ft)

Population (2011)
  - Total: 16,554

Languages
  - Official: Kannada
- Time zone: UTC+5:30 (IST)
- Postal code: 586 115
- Area code: +91-8488
- ISO 3166 code: IN-KA
- Vehicle registration: KA:28
- Nearest City: Sindagi
- Lok Sabha constituency: Bijapur
- Vidhan Sabha constituency: Devara Hipparagi

Devara Hipparagi is a New Taluk of Vijayapura district, Karnataka, India.

== Geography ==
Devara Hipparagi is located at 16.92°N 76.23°E, about 37 kilometres (23 mi) east of Bijapur and 23 kilometres (14 mi) from Sindagi. It has an average elevation of 500 metres (1640 feet). It is major market hub for near by villages. The location of Devara Hipparagi is accessible by road. It is a major junction to reach or divert the routes to Bijapur, Bagalkot, Chadchan, Indi, Gulbarga, Muddebihal, Talikot, Sindagi & Solapur.

== Famous Co operative Society ==
- Krupa multipurpose Co Operative society ltd Devar hipparagi

== Demographics ==
As of 2001 India census, Devar Hipparagi had a population of 16,554. Males constitute 51 percent of the population and females 49 percent. Devar Hipparagi has an average literacy rate of 56 percent, lower than the national average of 59.5 percent: male literacy is 63 percent, and female literacy is 49 percent. 16 percent of the population is under 6.

== Points of interest ==
There are nearly 40 temples in Devara Hipparagi, including Mallayya, Ravutaraya, Kalmeshwar, Madiwal machidev, Karidevru, and Baanati. The fourteenth-century monument Mahalagumb (Deepstumb) is on the ground of Mallayya temple.

== See also ==
- Bijapur
- Sindagi
- Chadchan
- Basavana Bagewadi
- Kalaburagi
- Muddebihal
- Bagalkot
