= M. M. Joshi =

M. M. Joshi may refer to:

- Murli Manohar Joshi (born 1934), Indian politician and physicist
- M. M. Joshi (ophthalmologist) (born 1935), Indian ophthalmologist
