= National Highway 50 (India) =

National highway in India

National Highway 50
- Map of National Highway 50 in red
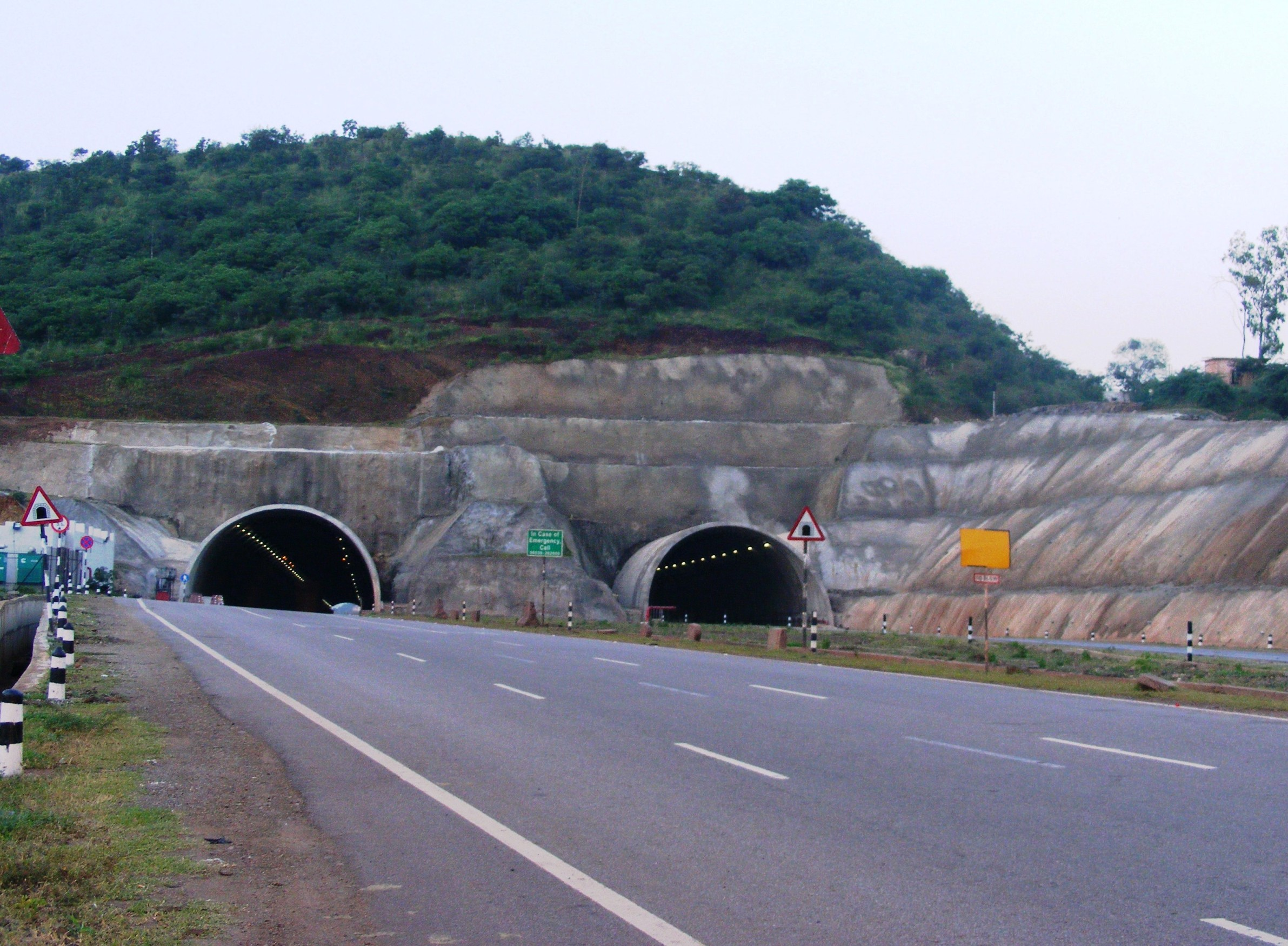
- Hospet Tunnel on NH 50

Route information
- Length: 751.4 km (466.9 mi)

Major junctions
- North end: Nanded
- South end: Chitradurga

Location
- Country: India
- States: Maharashtra:-110 km (68 mi); Karnataka:- 641.4 km (398.5 mi)
- Major cities: Nanded, Udgir, Bidar, Humnabad, Kalaburgi, Jevargi, Sindagi, Vijayapur, Hungund, Ilkal, Kushtagi, Hosapete, Kudligi, Chitradurga
- Primary destinations: Nanded, Udgir, Bidar, Humnabad, Kalaburgi, Jevargi, Sindagi, Vijayapur, Hungund, Ilkal, Kushtagi, Hosapete, Kudligi, Chitradurga.

Highway system
- Roads in India; Expressways; National; State; Asian
← NH 161	→ NH 48

National Highway 50 (NH 50) is a primary national highway in India. It traverses the states of Maharashtra and Karnataka. The total length of the highway is 751.4 km (466.9 mi).

== Route ==
NH 50

- Nanded
- Loha
- Kandhar
- Jalkot
- Udgir
- Bidar
- Humnabad
- Kalaburagi
- Jevargi
- Sindagi
- Devara Hipparagi
- Shivanagi
- Vijayapura
- Managuli
- Nidagundi
- Hunagunda
- Ilkal
- Kushtagi
- Hosapete
- Kudligi
- Jagalur
- Chitradurga

== Junctions ==
NH 161 Terminal near Nanded.
NH 361 near Loha.
NH 63 Terminal near Udgir.
NH 65 Terminal near Humnabad.
NH 150 Terminal near Kalaburgi.
NH 150A Terminal near Jevargi.
NH 52 Terminal near Vijayapura.
NH 67 Terminal near Hospet.
NH 48 Terminal near Chitradurga.

== See also ==
- List of national highways in India
- List of national highways in India by state
- List of state highways in Karnataka
