= Alkoppa =

- village
- Country: India
- State: Karnataka
- District: Bijapur

Population (2011)
  - Total: 2,200

Languages
  - Official: Kannada
- Time zone: UTC+5:30 (IST)

Alkoppa is a village in the southern state of Karnataka, India. It is located in the Muddebihal taluk of Bijapur district.

== Demography ==
In the 2011 census, Algur had 253 families with a population of 1,309, consisting of 665 males and 644 females. The population of children aged 0–6 was 215, making up 16.42% of the total population of the village. The average sex ratio was 968 out of 1000, which is lower than the state average of 973 out of 1000. The child sex ratio in the village was 1009 out of 1000, which is higher than the average of 948 out of 1000 in the state of Karnataka.
