= Kolhar (Old) =

- village
- Location in Karnataka, India Kolhar (Old) (India)
- Coordinates: 16.59°N 75.96°E
- Country: India
- State: Karnataka
- District: Bijapur
- Talukas: Kolhar

Population (2001)
  - Total: 11,935

Languages
  - Official: Kannada
- Time zone: UTC+5:30 (IST)

Kolhar (Old) is a village in the southern state of Karnataka, India. It is located at the bank of river Krishna in the Kolhar taluk of Bijapur district. As of 2001 India census, Kolhar (Old) had a population of 11,935 with 6074 men and 5861 women.

Characteristic dishes include solid curd and fish. Due to water supply linked to the Alimatti dam, New Kolhar was formed in North Karnataka. Since the shift, three educational institutions remain, including: Shree Sangameshwar P U College, Kolhar, Shree Sangameshwar D.ed. college, Kolhar.

NH-218 Hubballi-Kalburgi passes through; the nearest railway station is Telagi or Basavan Bagewadi Cross, 25 km away.

== See also ==
- Bijapur district
- Districts of Karnataka
