= Almel =

Almel Yelmeli
- Town
- Nickname: ಸಕ್ಕರೆ ಪಟ್ಟಣ
- Location in Karnataka, India Almel (India)
- Coordinates: 16.92°N 76.24°E
- Country: India
- State: Karnataka
- Region: Bayalu Seeme
- District: Bijapur
- Taluk: Almel
- Elevation: 516 m (1,693 ft)

Population (2011)
  - Total: 18,667

Languages
  - Official language: Kannada
- Time zone: UTC+5:30 (IST)
- PIN: 586202
- Telephone code: 08488
- Vehicle registration: KA:28
- Nearest City: 80 km Bijapur, 76 km Gulbarga, Solapur 92 km, Pune 344 km and hubballi 260 km
- Lok Sabha constituency: Bijapur
- Vidhan Sabha constituency: Sindagi

Almel is a New Taluk of Vijayapura District Karnataka, India. The Almel town has a branch of Karnataka Bank

== Geography ==
Almel is located at 16.92°N 76.24°E, about 80 kilometres (50 mi) east of Bijapur and 20 kilometres (12 mi) from Sindagi. It has an average elevation of 516 metres (1693 feet). It is major market hub for near by villages. The location of Almel is very strategic & accessible by road. It is major junction to reach or divert the routes to Bijapur, Indi, Gulbarga, Sindagi, Afzalpur, Bidar & Solapur.

== Demographics ==
As of 2001 India census, Almel had a population of 18,667 with 9,454 Males and 9,213 Females.

== See also ==
- Bijapur
- Districts of Karnataka
- Sindagi
- Muddebihal
- Bengaluru
