= Arekeri =

Coordinates: 12°53′N 75°47′E

Arakeri is a small village in Bijapur district, Karnataka, India. It is around 14 km from Bijapur city, located near to the Solapur, Mangalore highway.
