= Devara Hippargi =

- village
- Location in Karnataka, India Devara Hippargi (India)
- Coordinates: 16.92°N 76.24°E
- Country: India
- State: Karnataka
- District: Bijapur
- Talukas: Devara Hippargi

Population (2001)
  - Total: 11,513

Languages
  - Official: Kannada
- Time zone: UTC+5:30 (IST)
- Postal code: 586115

Devara Hippargi is a New Taluk in the Southern state of Karnataka, India. It is New taluk of Bijapur district in Karnataka.

== Demographics ==
As of 2001 India census, Devara Hippargi had a population of 11513 with 5905 males and 5608 females.

== See also ==
- Bijapur district
- Districts of Karnataka
