= Talikoti =

- City
- Location in Karnataka, India
- Coordinates: 16.48°N 76.32°E
- Country: India
- State: Karnataka
- District: Bijapur
- Taluk: Talikoti
- Elevation: 509 m (1,670 ft)

Population (2001)
  - Total: 26,217

Languages
  - Official: Kannada
- Time zone: UTC+5:30 (IST)
- Postal code: 586214
- Area code: +91-8356
- ISO 3166 code: IN-KA
- Vehicle registration: KA-28
- Website: talikotetown.mrc.gov.in

Talikoti, also called Talikot, Talikota, or Talikote, is a taluq in Vijaypur district in the northern part of the Indian state of Karnataka, about 85 kilometres to the southeast of Vijayapura city. It lies on the river called Doni. It is known for the Battle of Talikota in 1565.

== Geography ==
Talikoti is located at 16.48°N 76.32°E. It has an average elevation of 509 metres (1669 feet).

== Demographics ==
As of the 2011 India census, Talikota had a population of 68,217. Males constitute 56% of the population and females 44%. Talikoti has an average literacy rate of 72%, higher than the national average of 59.5%: male literacy is 81%, and female literacy is 62%. In Talikoti, 22% of the population is under 6 years of age.

== See also ==
- Bijapur
- Muddebihal
- Basavana Bagewadi
- Sindagi
- Bagalkot
- Karnataka
