= Yargatti =

- Town
- Location in Karnataka, India Yargatti (India)
- Coordinates: 15°58′N 75°01′E
- Country: India
- State: Karnataka
- District: Belgaum
- Talukas: Yargatti

Languages
  - Official: Kannada
- Time zone: UTC+5:30 (IST)

Yargatti is a village in Belgaum district in the southern state of Karnataka, India.
