= Nagathan =

- village
- Location in Karnataka, India Nagathan (India)
- Coordinates: 16.83°N 75.73°E
- Country: India
- State: Karnataka
- District: Bijapur
- Talukas: Bijapur

Population (2011)
  - Total: 7,255

Languages
  - Official: Kannada
- Time zone: UTC+5:30 (IST)

Nagathan is a village in the Bijapur taluk of Bijapur district in the southern state of Karnataka, India.

== Demographics ==
As of 2011 India census, Nagathan had a population of 7255 with 3703 males and 3552 females.
