= M. M. Joshi (ophthalmologist) =

Indian ophthalmologist

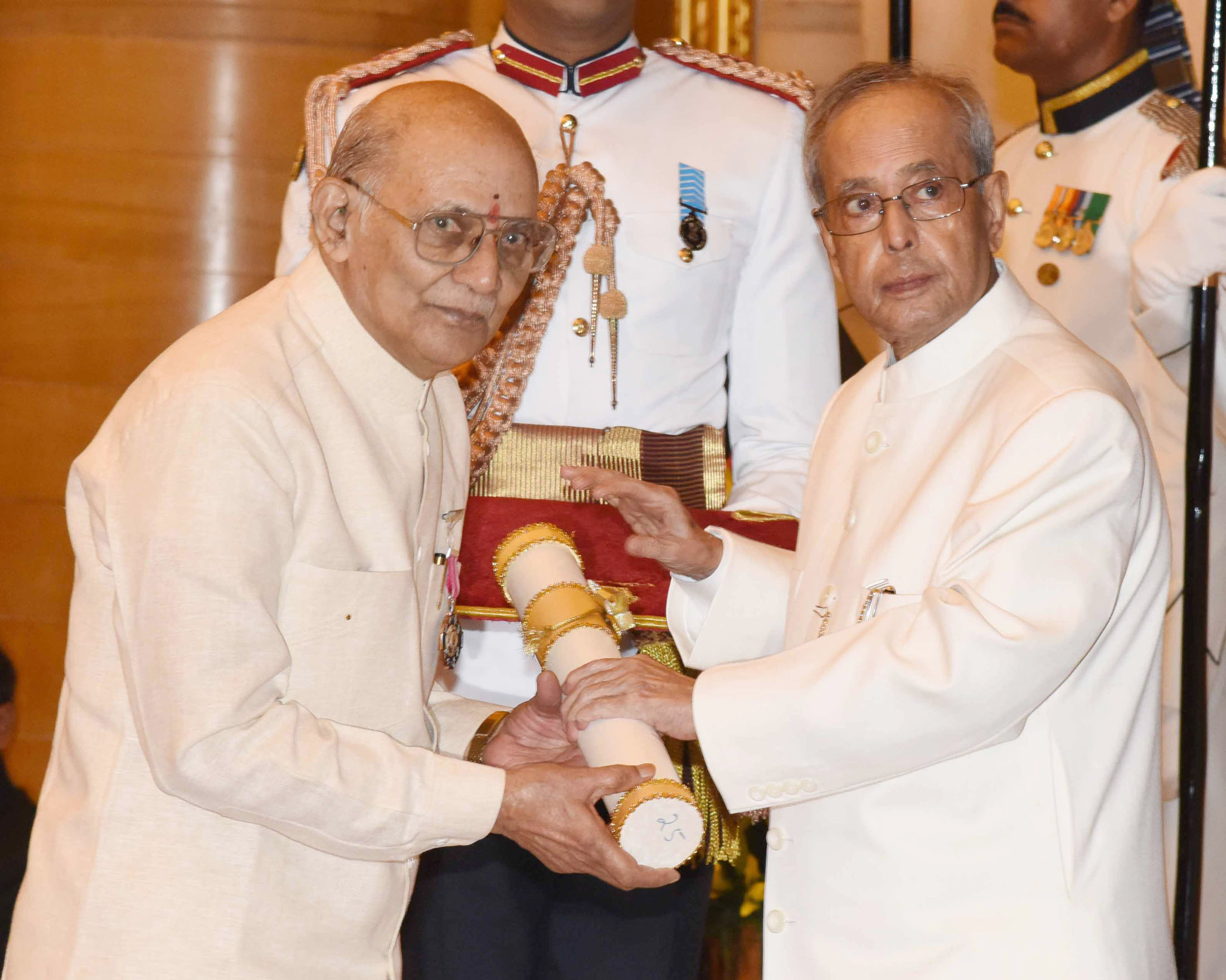
- Shri Pranab Mukherjee presenting the Padma Shri Award to Dr Mahipati M. Joshi, 2016
- Born: 10 May 1935 (age 91); Nimbal
- Occupation: Ophthalmologist
- Known for: M. M. Joshi Eye Institute
- Awards: Padma Shri; Rajyotsava Prashasti; AIOS Lifetime achievement Award; FIE Foundation National Award
- Website: https://www.mmjoshieyeinstitute.com

Mahipathi Madhwacharya Joshi (born 1935) is an Indian ophthalmologist and the founder of M. M. Joshi Eye Institute (Padma Nayanalaya), a 75-bedded super-specialty eye hospital, located in Hubli and Dharwad, and the largest in the region. The first post graduate private practitioner in the state of Karnataka, he is one of the founders of Karnataka Ophthalmic Society and a recipient of Rajyotsava Prashasti, the second highest civilian award of the Government of Karnataka. The Government of India awarded him the fourth highest civilian honour of the Padma Shri, in 2016, for his contributions to medicine.

== Biography ==
M. M. Joshi was born on 10 May 1935 in the village of Nimbal in Bijapur district of the south Indian state of Karnataka. After securing a post graduate degree (MS) in ophthalmology, he started his private practice in Hubli, the first post graduate ophthalmologist from Karnataka to enter private practice, and in 1967, founded M. M. Joshi Eye Institute. The institution has over the years grown to become a two-location (Hubli and Dharwad) super specialty hospital group and is a post graduate institute in ophthalmology. Under the egis of his institute, Joshi is involved in organizing free eye camps and Continuing medical education programs. he is reported to have established the first eye bank in the state of Karnataka and is known to have initiated the first eye donation program in the state. He is one of the founders of Karnataka Ophthalmic Society and it was the only professional body in ophthalmology in the state when it was established in 1980. The Government of Karnataka honored him with Rajyotsava Prashasti in 1989 and he received the national civilian honor of the Padma Shri in 2016. Joshi, a recipient of an honorary doctorate from Karnataka University, also received the National Award of FIE Foundation in 1997 and Lifetime Achievement Award of the All India Ophthalmic Society in 2015. The Karnataka Ophthalmic Society have instituted an annual award, Dr. M.M. Joshi Best Paper Award, in his honor for recognizing innovations in ophthalmology.

== See also ==
- Eye bank
