= Karnataka State Women's University =

State University in Karnataka

Coordinates: 16.8356°N 75.6426°E

Karnataka State Akkamahadevi Women University
- Type: Public
- Established: August 2003; 22 years ago
- Affiliations: UGC
- Chancellor: Governor of Karnataka
- Vice-Chancellor: Vijaya B. Korishetti
- Location: Bijapur, Karnataka, India
- Campus: Urban
- Website: www.ka.kswu.ac.in

Karnataka State Akkamahadevi Women University Vijayapura (KSAWU, Vijayapura) also known as Karnataka State Women's University was established in August 2003 and is the first university exclusively for women in the state of Karnataka. It is in the city of Vijayapur (formerly known as Bijapur). Prof. Vijaya B. Korishetti is Vice-Chancellor.

It is recognized under 2(f) and 12(B) of the UGC Act. Seventy women's colleges spread in twelve districts of north Karnataka are affiliated to this university.

It offers UG programmes leading to bachelor's degree in Arts, Business Administration, Computer Applications, Commerce, Education, Fashion Technology, Home Science, Physical Education, Science and Social Work. It also offers 20 PG courses, PG diploma and certificate courses in the Faculties of Arts, Commerce and Management, Social Sciences, Science and Technology and Education.

== Departments and Faculty ==
There are about 8 departments on the University campus in totality. Namely, Department of Humanities, Social Science, Science and Technology, Management Studies, Studies in Education and Research, Physical Education, Director of Sports and Centre for Yoga Studies.

=== Humanities Department ===
The humanities department is further divided into various subjects. There is a department of Kannada, department of English, department of Hindi, department of Urdu and a Centre for Performing Arts. Most of these sub-departments offer MA, MPhil and PhD. Some of them go even further than that to provide PG Diploma in the spectrum of subjects.

=== Social Sciences Department ===
The social sciences department offers courses in economics, history, journalism and mass communication, library and information science, social work, sociology, political science and a specific department altogether to undertake research endeavors. Most departments offer MA, MPhil, Phd and Diploma in the subjects while some also offer certificate courses.

=== Science and Technology Department ===
The department of Science and Technology offers study opportunities in bioinformatics, biotech, botany, chemistry, computer science, electronics, food processing and nutrition, pharmaceuticals chemistry, physics, zoology, nutrition, statistics and mathematics. Like the other departments, these courses are also offered at masters, MPhil, PhD and certificate level.

=== Department of Studies in Education and Research ===
This department has courses of B.Ed, M.Ed, MPhil and PhD. There are about 100 seats for the B.Ed and 40 seats for the M.Ed.

=== Department of Studies in Physical Education and Sports Sciences ===
This department has courses in B.P.Ed, M.P.Ed, MPhil, PhD and certificate course in Yoga studies.

== Facilities ==
A lot of facilities are offered on the campus. There is a library. There is a Syndicate Bank on the University campus, there is an on-call Hostel Ambulance, a Health centre and an ICT cell. The college also offers an on campus hostel facility. The University also offers a variety of scholarships for students coming from under privileged backgrounds.
