= Tikota =

- Taluka
- Location in Karnataka, India Tikota (India)
- Coordinates: 16.76°N 75.62°E
- Country: India
- State: Karnataka
- District: Vijayapur

Population (2001)
  - Total: 11,284

Languages
  - Official: Kannada
- Time zone: UTC+5:30 (IST)
- Vehicle registration: KA-28
- Nearest city: Vijayapur, Karnataka
- Sex ratio: 961
- Literacy: 70%
- Lok Sabha constituency: Vijayapur

Tikota is a taluka in the southern state of Karnataka, India. It is located in the Bijapur District.

== Demographics ==
As of 2001 India census, Tikota is a large village located in Bijapur Taluka of Bijapur district, Karnataka with total 2,235 families residing. The Tikota village has a population of 11,984 of which 6,111 are males while 5,873 are females as per the 2011 Census.

In Tikota village the population of children with age 0-6 is 1,596, which makes up 13.32 % of the total population. The average sex ratio of Tikota village is 961:1,000, which is lower than the Karnataka state average of 973:1000. The child sex ratio for the Tikota as per the census is 968:1,000, higher than the Karnataka average of 948:1,000.

As per the constitution of India and the Panchyati Raaj Act, Tikota village is administrated by a Sarpanch who is elected representative of village.

== Geography ==
The village is situated geographically at 16°50'28.2"N north latitude and 75°31'13.1"E east longitude.

== Agriculture ==
The village mainly grows sugarcane, exporting grapes, pomegranate, maize, and sorghum (jawar), as well as small portions of lemon, onion and turmeric etc. Irrigation takes place via canals, bore-wells and wells.

== Festivals ==
Every year people are celebrating Basava Jayanti Sankranti, Ugadi, Kara Hunnume, Nagara Panchami, Deepavli, Dassara and moharam many more.

== Language ==
The main languages in Tikota are Kannada (the most prevalent), as well as Hindi and Marathi as well.

== Politics ==
The village comes under Babaleshwar Assembly Constituency and the Bijapur Lok Sabha constituency for state and national elections, respectively.

== Literacy Rate ==
Tikota village has lower literacy rate compared to Karnataka overall. In 2011, literacy rate of Tikota village was 70.02 % compared to 75.36 % in Karnataka as a whole. In Tikota, male literacy stands at 78.08 % while the female literacy rate was 61.64 %.

== Telephone exchange center ==
- Telephone Exchange Center, Tikota
- STC Code - 08352

== Post office ==
- Post Office, Tikota
- PINCode-586130 (Head Post Office at Tikota)

== Highways ==
- National Highway - 12 => Vijayapur - Tikota - Athani
- State Highway - 43 => Tikota - Kanamadi - Jath

== Climate and temperature ==
Climate data for Tikota
Month	Jan	Feb	Mar	Apr	May	Jun	Jul	Aug	Sep	Oct	Nov	Dec	Year
Mean daily maximum °C (°F)	29.2 (84.6)	32.8 (91.0)	35.9 (96.6)	37.9 (100.2)	37.5 (99.5)	34.0 (93.2)	31.1 (88.0)	31.0 (87.8)	31.1 (88.0)	31.0 (87.8)	29.5 (85.1)	29.0 (84.2)	32.5 (90.5)
Mean daily minimum °C (°F)	15.5 (59.9)	17.6 (63.7)	22.6 (72.7)	24.0 (75.2)	25.0 (77.0)	23.0 (73.4)	22.2 (72.0)	22.0 (71.6)	22.7 (72.9)	20.2 (68.4)	16.7 (62.1)	13.0 (55.4)	20.4 (68.7)
Average rainfall mm (inches)	8.6 (0.34)	3.1 (0.12)	6.0 (0.24)	10.0 (0.39)	16.2 (0.64)	61.1 (2.41)	77.1 (3.04)	74.5 (2.93)	62.0 (2.44)	51.6 (2.03)	27.2 (1.07)	3.5 (0.14)	400.9 (15.79)

The village has a semi-arid climate. It has an average elevation of 606 metres (1988 ft) above sea level.
