= Kolhar, Bijapur =

Kolhar
- village
- Interactive map of Kolhar
- Location in Karnataka, India Kolhar (India)
- Coordinates: 16.59°N 75.96°E
- Country: India
- State: Karnataka
- District: Bijapur

Population (2001)
  - Total: 11,935

Languages
  - Official: Kannada
- Time zone: UTC+5:30 (IST)

Kolar or Kolhar is a panchayat village in the southern state of Karnataka, India. It is located near Basavana Bagewadi, Bijapur district in Karnataka.

== Demographics ==
As of 2001 India census, Kolhar had a population of 11,935 with 6,074 males and 5,861 females.

== See also ==
- Bijapur district
