= Chadchan =

- Town
- Location in Karnataka, India Chadchan (India)
- Coordinates: 17°18′37.917″N 75°40′12.237″E
- Country: India
- State: Karnataka
- District: Bijapur
- Talukas: Chadchan

Government
  - Type: Town Panchayat
- Elevation: 463 m (1,519 ft)

Population (2011)
  - Total: 15,542

Languages
  - Official: Kannada
- Time zone: UTC+5:30 (IST)
- Postal code: 586205
- Area code: +91-8422
- ISO 3166 code: IN-KA
- Vehicle registration: KA-28
- Nearest city: Indi
- Literacy: 66.94%

Chadchan is a taluq in the southern state of Karnataka, India. It is located in Bijapur district in northern part of Karnataka.

Chadchan is a medium-sized town, mostly popular in northern Karnataka and southern Maharashtra for its wholesale clothing market. This town lies very close (just 15 km (9.3 mi) from the border) to the Karnataka – Maharashtra border and hence is easily accessible to people from both the states.

From the connectivity point of view, this place lies at Bijapur–Pandharpur route exactly at the center of both places, i.e., 65 km (40 mi) from Bijapur and 65 km (40 mi) from Pandharpur. Also, its neighbouring village Zalaki possess good connectivity to both Solapur and Bijapur because of the national highway.

== Demographics ==
According to 2011 India census, Chadchan had a population of 15,542, with 7923 males and 7619 females. The total number of children in the age group 0-6 is 2179. The literacy rate for the town is 66.94%. In Chadchan male literacy stands at 73.79% while female literacy was 59.82%

=== Languages ===
Kannada is the official and most widely spoken language in the town.

=== Religion ===
Hinduism is the most popular and the majority religion followed in the town. As in rest of the Bijapur District, Lingayatism is widely practiced and Lingayats form the biggest community within Hindus. The village deity is Sri Sangameshwara and every year festival is celebrated to honor village deity. Islam is second most professed faith in the town.

== Economy ==
Chadchan is a commercial center for nearby villages. Economy of the town is mostly service and agriculture based. Chadchan has been a major trading center for most of the villagers around the town. A large number of people work in unorganized sector as daily wage earners.

== Transport ==
=== Road ===
The town is located 65 km (40 mi) from district headquarters Bijapur and 35 km (22 mi) from Indi. Solapur, another major city in neighboring Maharashtra, is also located 65 km (40 mi) away from the town. The mode of transport is state-run buses running between cities. Chadchan has a bus station connecting it to major cities in North Karnataka and Maharashtra. Solapur is a major city that has connectivity to most cities in India.

=== Rail ===
The nearest railway station is Indi road railway station about 6 km (3.7 mi) from Indi and 30 km (19 mi) from Chadchan. It connects to both Solapur railway station in Solapur and Bijapur_railway_station in Bijapur. Regular trains are available from Solapur and Bijapur to other parts of the country.

== See also ==
- Districts of Karnataka
