= List of districts of Karnataka =

Districts of Karnataka
- Districts of Karnataka
- Category: Districts
- Location: Karnataka
- Number: 31 districts
- Populations: Kodagu – 554,519 (lowest); Bengaluru Urban – 9,621,551 (highest)
- Areas: Bengaluru Urban – 2,190 km^{2} (850 sq mi) (smallest); Belagavi – 13,415 km^{2} (5,180 sq mi) (largest)
- Government: Government of Karnataka
- Subdivisions: List of taluks of Karnataka

The southern Indian state of Karnataka consists of 31 districts grouped into 4 administrative divisions, viz., Belagavi, Bengaluru , Gulbarga, and Mysore. Geographically, the state has three principal variants: the western coastal stretch, the hilly belt comprising the Western Ghats, and the plains, comprising the plains of the Deccan Plateau.

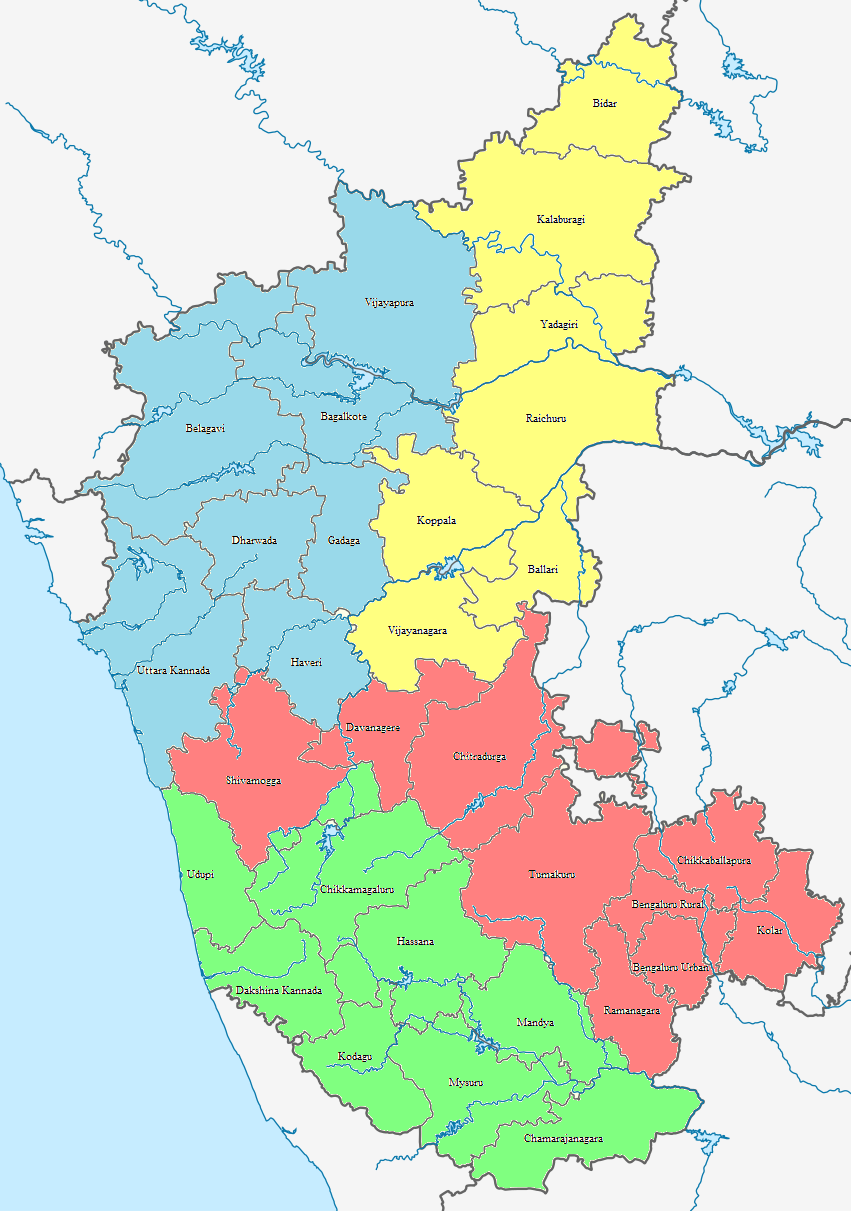
4 Divisions and 31 Districts of Indian state of Karnataka.

== History ==
Mysore State that was created during States Reorganisation of 1956.

Karnataka took its present shape in 1956, when the former states of Mysore and Coorg were unified into a linguistically homogenous Kannada-speaking state along with agglomeration of districts of the former states of Bombay, Hyderabad, and Madras as part of the States Reorganisation Act of 1956. The unified Mysore State was made up of ten districts, viz., Bangalore, Kolar, Tumkur, Mandya, Mysore, Hassan, Chikkamagalur, Shimoga, Chitradurga, and Ballari which had been transferred from Madras Presidency to Mysore State earlier in 1953, when the new state of Andhra Pradesh was created out of Madras' northern districts. Coorg State became Kodagu district, South Canara was transferred from Madras State, North Canara, Dharwad, Belgaum, and Bijapur from Bombay State. Bidar, Gulbarga, and Raichur from Hyderabad State. The state received its new name of Karnataka in the year 1973.

=== Formations of districts ===
Chronology of formation of new districts
Date	New district	Formerly part of	Administration
15 August 1986	Bengaluru Urban	Bengaluru	Ramakrishna Hegde's ministry
15 August 1986	Bengaluru Rural	Bengaluru	Ramakrishna Hegde's ministry
25 August 1997	Chamarajanagara	Mysuru	J. H. Patel's ministry
25 August 1997	Davanagere	Chitradurga, Ballari and Shivamogga	J. H. Patel's ministry
25 August 1997	Bagalakote	Vijayapura	J. H. Patel's ministry
25 August 1997	Gadaga Haveri	Dharwad	J. H. Patel's ministry
25 August 1997	Udupi	Dakshina Kannada	J. H. Patel's ministry
25 August 1997	Koppala	Raichur	J. H. Patel's ministry
21 June 2007	Ramanagara	Bengaluru Rural	H.D. Kumaraswamy's ministry
21 June 2007	Chikkaballapura	Kolar	H.D. Kumaraswamy's ministry
30 December 2009	Yadagiri	Kalaburagi	B.S. Yediyurappa's second ministry
18 November 2020	Vijayanagara	Ballari	B.S. Yediyurappa's fourth ministry

== Administrative structure ==
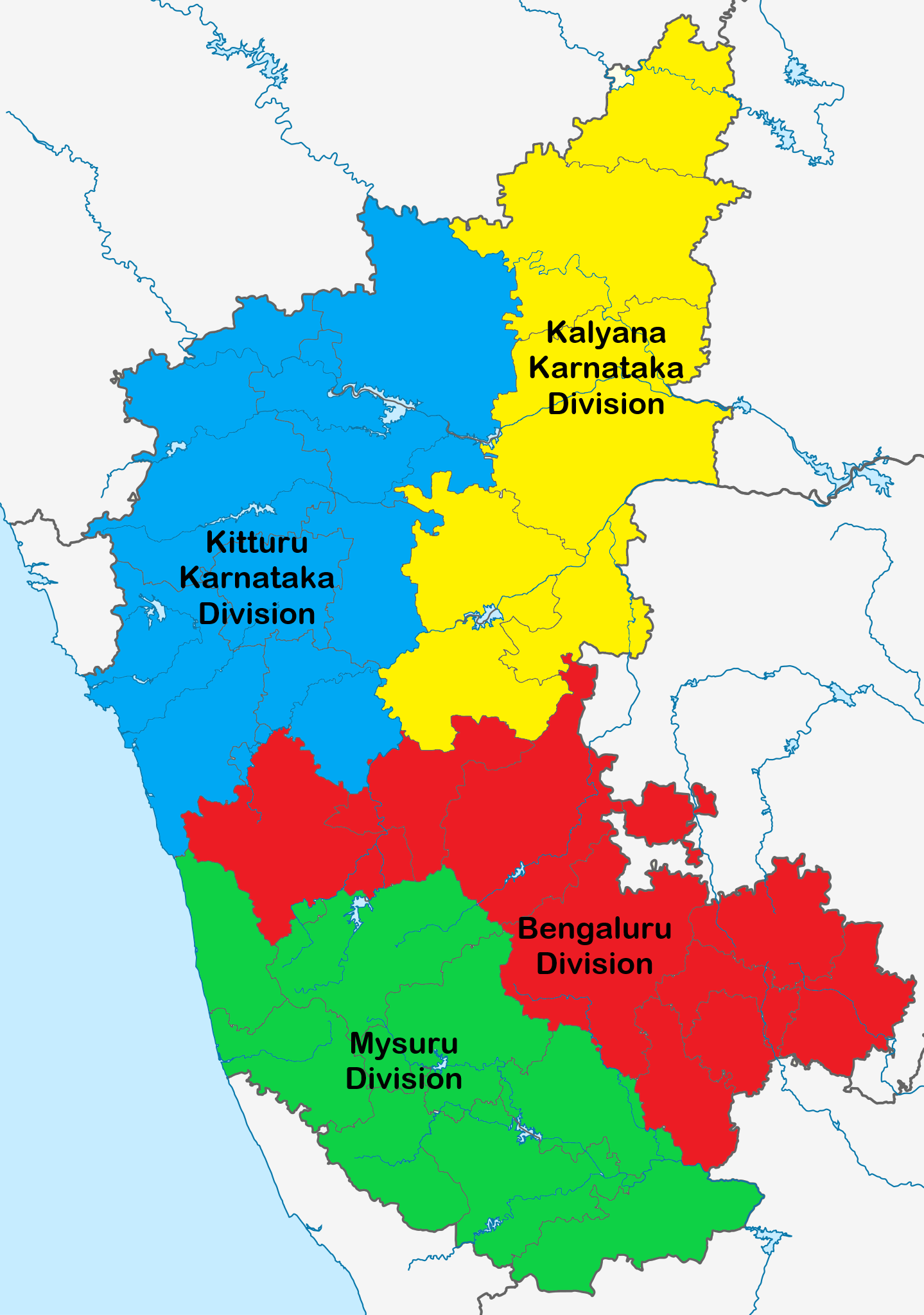
4 Divisions of Indian State of Karnataka.

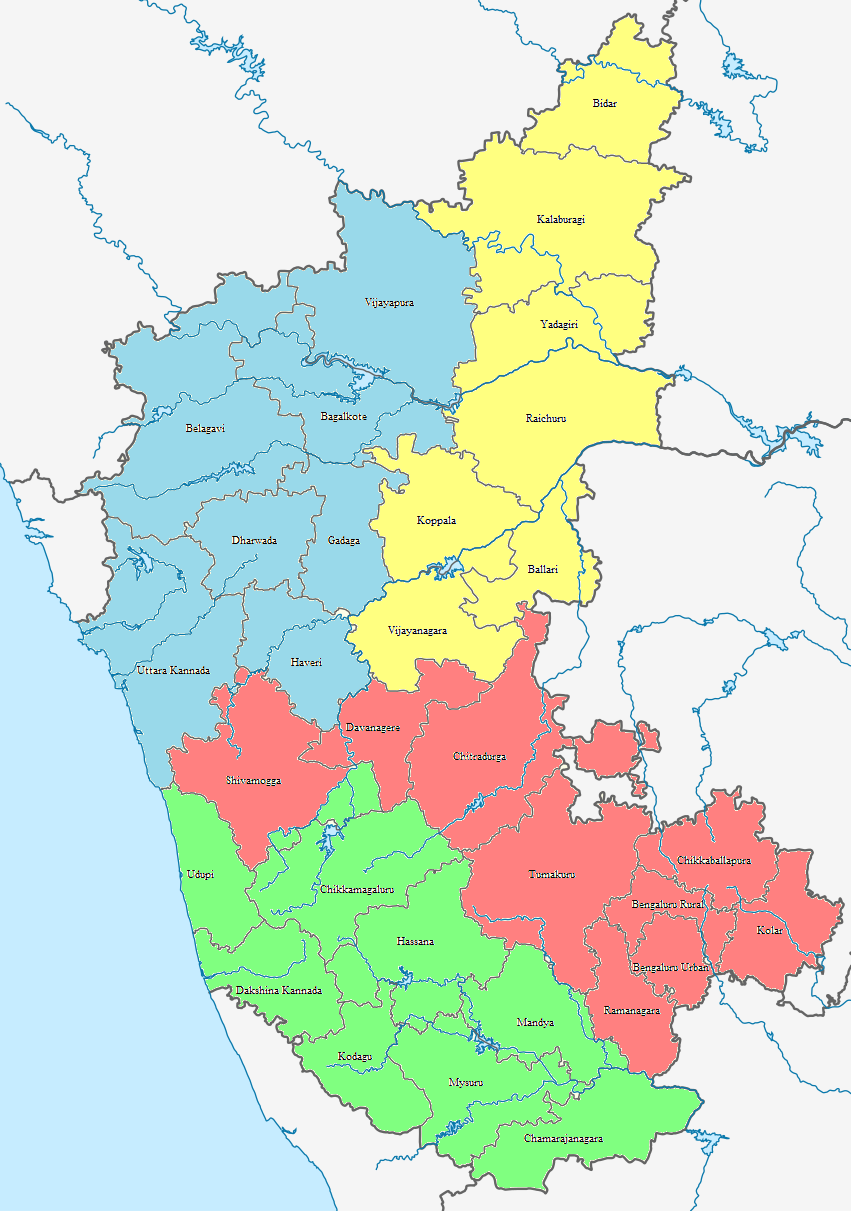
31 Districts of Indian state of Karnataka.

=== District administration ===
A district of an Indian state is an administrative geographical unit, headed by a Deputy Commissioner (DC), an officer belonging to the Indian Administrative Service (IAS). The Deputy Commissioner reports to the Regional Commissioner. The Deputy Commissioner is also the Collector and District Magistrate of the district. The Deputy Commissioner is assisted by an Additional Deputy Commissioner at the district headquarters. The deputy commissioner is assisted by a number of officers belonging to the Karnataka Administrative Service. The deputy commissioner/collector is assisted by assistant commissioners and tahsildars, who are incharge of subdivisions and taluks respectively. The district (revenue district) is divided into subdivisions. Each subdivision consists of several talukas under its administrative purview. Each subdivision is headed by a Sub-Divisional Officer (SDO), who holds the designation of Assistant Commissioner and Sub-Divisional Magistrate. Each taluka is headed by a Tahsildar. These subdivisions and talukas are established for land revenue and land administration purposes. Each taluk contains hobli and villages, headed by Revenue Inspectors and Village Accountants respectively.

=== Police administration ===
A Superintendent of Police (SP), usually an officer belonging to the Indian Police Service (IPS), is entrusted with the responsibility of maintaining law and order and related issues of the district. He is assisted by the officers of the Karnataka Police Service and other Karnataka Police officials. Big cities like Bengaluru, Belagavi, Hubballi-Dharwad, Kalaburagi, Mangaluru and Mysuru are headed by a Commissioner of Police holding the rank of Additional Director General of Police(ADGP) for Bengaluru, Inspector General of Police (IGP) for Mysuru and Deputy Inspector General of Police (DIG) for Belagavi, Hubballi-Dharwad, Kalaburagi and Mangaluru. They are assisted by officers belonging to the Karnataka Police Service (KSPS).

=== Forest ===
A Deputy Conservator of Forests, an officer belonging to the Indian Forest Service selected through the UPSC examination is responsible for managing the forests, the environment and wildlife of the district. He is assisted by the officers of the Karnataka Forest Service selected through the KPSC examination.

=== Other department ===
Sectoral development is looked after by the district head of each development department such as Public Works, Health, Education, Agriculture, Animal husbandry, etc. These officers belong to the various state services.

=== Administrative divisions ===
Belagavi Division	Bengaluru Division	Kalaburagi Division	Mysuru Division
Belagavi (Headquarters); Bagalkote; Dharwada; Gadaga; Haveri; Uttara Kannada (Karavara); Vijayapura	Bengaluru Urban (Headquarters); Bengaluru North (Doddaballapura); Bengaluru South (Ramanagara); Chikkaballapura; Chitradurga; Davanagere; Kolar; Shivamogga; Tumakuru	Kalaburagi (Headquarters); Ballari; Bidar; Koppala; Raichuru; Vijayanagara (Hospete); Yadagiri	Mysuru (Headquarters); Chamarajanagara; Chikkamagaluru; Dakshina Kannada (Mangaluru); Hassan; Kodagu (Madikeri); Mandya; Udupi

== Alphabetical listing of districts ==
Code	District	Headquarters	Established	Subdivisions (Taluka)	Population(As of 2011)	Area	Population density(As of 2011)	Map
BAG	Bagalkote	Bagalkote	15 August 1997	Badami; Bagalkote; Bilagi; Ilkal; Hunagunda; Rabkavi Banhatti; Guledgudda; Jamkhandi; Mudhol	1,889,752	6,575 km^{2} (2,539 sq mi)	288/km^{2} (750/sq mi)	
BEU	Bengaluru Urban	Bengaluru	1 November 1956	Bengaluru; Anekal; Yelahanka; Kengeri; Krishnaraja Pura; Sarjapura	9,621,551	2,190 km^{2} (850 sq mi)	4,393/km^{2} (11,380/sq mi)	
BEN	Bengaluru North	Doddaballapura	15 August 1986	Doddaballapura; Devanahalli; Hosakote; Nelamangala; Dabaspete; Dodda Belavangala	990,923	2,259 km^{2} (872 sq mi)	431/km^{2} (1,120/sq mi)	
BES	Bengaluru South	Ramanagara	10 September 2007	Ramanagara; Bidadi; Channapatna; Kanakapura; Harohalli; Kodihalli; Magadi; Kuduru; Huliyurdurga; Kunigal	1,082,636	3,556 km^{2} (1,373 sq mi)	308/km^{2} (800/sq mi)	
BEL	Belagavi	Belgaum	1 November 1956	Athni; Bailhongal; Belgaum; Chikodi; Gokak; Hukkeri; Khanapur; Kagawad; Mudalagi; Nippani; Kittur; Raybag; Ramdurg; Saundatti; Yaragatti	4,779,661	13,415 km^{2} (5,180 sq mi)	356/km^{2} (920/sq mi)	
BAL	Ballari	Ballari	1 November 1956	Bellari; Kampli; Kurugodu; Sanduru; Siruguppa	1,400,970	4,252 km^{2} (1,642 sq mi)	330/km^{2} (850/sq mi)	
BID	Bidar	Bidar	1 November 1956	Bidar; Basavakalyan; Kamalnagar; Hulasuru; Chitgoppa; Bhalki; Homnabad; Aurad	1,703,300	5,448 km^{2} (2,103 sq mi)	313/km^{2} (810/sq mi)	
VIJ	Bijapur	Bijapur	1 November 1956	Vijayapura; Indi; Muddebihal; Babaleshwar; Nidagundi; Tikota; Devara Hippargi; Talikote; Chadchan; Kolhar; Sindgi; Basavana Bagevadi; Almel	2,177,331	10,498 km^{2} (4,053 sq mi)	210/km^{2} (540/sq mi)	
CHA	Chamarajanagara	Chamarajanagara	15 August 1997	Chamarajanagar; Gundlupet; Kollegal; Hanur; Yelandur	1,020,791	5,101 km^{2} (1,970 sq mi)	181/km^{2} (470/sq mi)	
CHI	Chikkaballapura	Chikkaballapur	10 September 2007	Bagepalli; Chikballapur; Chintamani; Gauribidanur; Gudibanda; Sidlaghatta; Manchenahalli	1,255,104	4,524 km^{2} (1,747 sq mi)	296/km^{2} (770/sq mi)	
CHK	Chikmagalur	Chikmagalur	1 November 1956	Chikmagalur; Kadur; Koppa; Mudigere; Kalasa; Narasimharajapura; Sringeri; Ajjampura; Tarikere	1,137,961	7,201 km^{2} (2,780 sq mi)	158/km^{2} (410/sq mi)	
CHT	Chitradurga	Chitradurga	1 November 1956	Challakere; Chitradurga; Hiriyur; Holalkere; Hosadurga; Molakalmuru	1,659,456	8,440 km^{2} (3,260 sq mi)	197/km^{2} (510/sq mi)	
DAK	Dakshina Kannada	Mangaluru	1 November 1956	Bantwal; Beltangadi; Mangaluru; Moodabidri; Kadaba; Puttur; Sulya	2,089,649	4,560 km^{2} (1,760 sq mi)	430/km^{2} (1,100/sq mi)	
DAV	Davanagere	Davanagere	15 August 1997	Channagiri; Davanagere; Harihar; Honnali; Jagalur; Nyamati	1,643,494	4,460 km^{2} (1,720 sq mi)	370/km^{2} (960/sq mi)	
DHA	Dhārawaḍa	Dhārawaḍa	1 November 1956	Annigeri; Alnavara; Dharwad; Hubli; Hubli City; Kalghatgi; Kundgol; Navalgund	1,847,023	4,260 km^{2} (1,640 sq mi)	434/km^{2} (1,120/sq mi)	
GAD	Gadag	Gadag	24 August 1997	Gadag-Betigeri; Mundargi; Nargund; Gajendragad; Lakshmeshwar; Ron; Shirhatti	1,064,570	4,656 km^{2} (1,798 sq mi)	229/km^{2} (590/sq mi)	
KAL	Kalaburagi	Kalaburagi	1 November 1956	Afzalpur; Aland; Chincholi; Chitapur; Kalaburagi; Kamalapura; Kalagi; Jevargi; Sedam; Shahbad; Yedrami	2,566,326	10,951 km^{2} (4,228 sq mi)	234/km^{2} (610/sq mi)	
HAS	Hassan	Hassan	1 November 1956	Alur; Arkalgud; Arsikere; Belur; Channarayapattana; Hassan; Holenarsipur; Sakleshpur	1,776,421	6,814 km^{2} (2,631 sq mi)	261/km^{2} (680/sq mi)	
HAV	Haveri	Haveri	24 August 1997	Byadgi; Hangal; Haveri; Hirekerur; Ranibennur; Rattihalli; Savanur; Shiggaon	1,597,668	4,823 km^{2} (1,862 sq mi)	331/km^{2} (860/sq mi)	
KOD	Kodagu	Madikeri	1 November 1956	Madikeri; Kushalanagar; Virajpet; Somvarpet; Ponnampet	554,519	4,102 km^{2} (1,584 sq mi)	135/km^{2} (350/sq mi)	
KL	Kolāra	Kolāra	1 November 1956	Bangarapet; Kolar; Kolar Gold Fields; Malur; Mulbagal; Srinivaspur	1,536,401	3,969 km^{2} (1,532 sq mi)	386/km^{2} (1,000/sq mi)	
KOP	Koppal	Koppal	24 August 1997	Gangawati; Kanakagiri; Kuknur; Karatagi; Koppal; Kushtagi; Yelbarga	1,389,920	7,189 km^{2} (2,776 sq mi)	250/km^{2} (650/sq mi)	
MAN	Mandya	Mandya	1 November 1956	Krishnarajpet; Maddur; Malavalli; Mandya; Nagamangala; Pandavapura; Shrirangapattana	1,805,769	4,961 km^{2} (1,915 sq mi)	364/km^{2} (940/sq mi)	
MYS	Mysuru	Mysuru	1 November 1956	Heggadadevana kote; Hunsur; Krishnarajanagara; Mysore; Nanjangud; Piriyapatna; Saragur; T.Narsipur	3,001,127	6,854 km^{2} (2,646 sq mi)	476/km^{2} (1,230/sq mi)	
RAI	Raichur	Raichur	1 November 1956	Devadurga; Lingsugur; Manvi; Maski; Raichur; Sindhnur; Sirwar	1,928,812	8,440 km^{2} (3,260 sq mi)	228/km^{2} (590/sq mi)	
SHI	Shivamogga	Shivamogga	1 November 1956	Bhadravati; Hosanagara; Sagar; Shikaripura; Shimoga; Sorab; Thirthahalli	1,752,753	8,477 km^{2} (3,273 sq mi)	207/km^{2} (540/sq mi)	
TUM	Tumakuru	Tumakuru	1 November 1956	Chiknayakanhalli; Gubbi; Koratagere; Kunigal; Madhugiri; Pavagada; Sira; Tiptur; Tumkur; Turuvekere	2,678,980	10,597 km^{2} (4,092 sq mi)	253/km^{2} (660/sq mi)	
UDU	Udupi	Udupi	25 August 1997	Udupi; Brahmavara; Karkal; Kapu; Kundapura; Hebri; Byndoor	1,177,361	3,880 km^{2} (1,500 sq mi)	329/km^{2} (850/sq mi)	
UTK	Uttara Kannada	Karwar	1 November 1956	Ankola; Bhatkal; Dandeli; Haliyal; Honnavar; Joida; Karwar; Kumta; Mundgod; Siddapur; Sirsi; Yellapur	1,437,169	10,291 km^{2} (3,973 sq mi)	140/km^{2} (360/sq mi)	
VIJ	Vijayanagara	Hosapete	18 November 2020	Harapanahalli; Hagaribommanahalli; Hoovina Hadagali; Hospete; Kottur; Kudligi	1,353,628	5,644 km^{2} (2,179 sq mi)	240/km^{2} (620/sq mi)	
YAD	Yadgiri	Yadgiri	30 December 2009	Gurumitkal; Hunasagi; Shahpur; Shorapur; Vadagera; Yadgir	1,174,271	5,234 km^{2} (2,021 sq mi)	224/km^{2} (580/sq mi)	

== Proposals for new districts ==
In Karnataka, demands for the administrative bifurcation of large or highly populated districts have been raised by various local committees and political representatives. As of early 2026, the state government has been evaluating proposals to divide several existing districts to reduce travel distances to administrative headquarters and streamline the delivery of public services.

List of Proposed Districts in Karnataka Grouped by Current District
Administrative Division	Current District	District	Headquarter	Expected Area of Jurisdiction
Belagavi	Bagalkote	Jamkhandi district	Jamkhandi	Northwastern tracts of Bagalkote district
Belagavi	Belagavi	Chikkodi district	Chikkodi	Northern tracts of Belagavi district
Belagavi	Belagavi	Gokak district	Gokak	Eastern tracts of Belagavi district
Belagavi	Uttara Kannada	Kumta district	Kumta	Southeasstern coastal taluks of Uttara Kannada district
Belagavi	Uttara Kannada	Karwar district	Karwar	Northern taluks of Uttara Kannada district
Belagavi	Uttara Kannada	Sirsi district	Sirsi	Malenadu (hill) region and eastern interior talukas of Uttara Kannada district
Belagavi	Vijayapura	Indi district	Indi	Northeastern tracts of Vijayapura district
Belagavi	Vijayapura	Muddebihal district	Muddebihal	Southern blocks of Vijayapur district
Bengaluru	Chikkaballapura and Kolar	Chintamani district	Chintamani	Eastern blocks of Chikkaballapura district and northeastern blocks of Kolar district
Bengaluru	Shivamogga	Sagara district	Sagara	Northeastern tracts of Shivamogga district
Bengaluru	Shivamogga	Shikaripura district	Shikaripura	Northern tracts of Shivamogga district
Bengaluru	Tumakuru	Madhugiri division	Madhugiri	Northern blocks of Tumakuru district
Bengaluru	Tumakuru	Pavagada district	Pavagada	Pavagada taluk of Tumakuru district.
Bengaluru	Tumakuru	Tiptur district	Tiptur	Western blocks of Tumakuru district
Kalaburagi	Bidar	Basavakalyana district	Basavakalyana	Southwastern tracts of Bidar district
Kalaburagi	Kalaburagi	Sedam district	Sedam	Eastern tracts of Kalaburagi district
Kalaburagi	Koppal and Raichur	Sindhanur district	Sindhanur	Wastern taluks of Raichuru district and an eastern taluk of Koppala district
Kalaburagi	Yadagiri	Shahapura district	Shahapur	Western taluks of Yadagiri district.
Mysuru	Dakshina Kannada	Mangaluru district	Mangaluru	Western tracts of Dakshina Kannada district
Mysuru	Dakshina Kannada	Puttur district	Puttur	Eastern tracts of Dakshina Kannada district
Mysuru	Mysuru	Hunsur district	Hunsur	Western inland talukas of Mysuru district
Mysuru	Udupi	Kundapura district	Kundapura	Northern tracts of Udupi district

== See also ==
- List of taluks of Karnataka
