= Muddebihal =

Muddebihala
- City
- Location in Karnataka, India Muddebihala (India)
- Coordinates: 16.33°N 76.13°E
- Country: India
- State: Karnataka
- Region: Bayalu Seeme
- District: Bijapur
- Elevation: 563 m (1,847 ft)

Population (2021)
  - Total: 45,000

Languages
  - Official language: Kannada
- Time zone: UTC+5:30 (IST)
- PIN: 586212
- Area code: +91-8356
- ISO 3166 code: IN-KA
- Vehicle registration: KA:28
- Website: muddebihaltown.mrc.gov.in

Muddebihala is both a City and a Taluk in the Vijayapura district in the Indian state of Karnataka.

== Geography ==
Muddebihal is located at 16° 20' 14" N and 76° 07' 55" E (16°20′14″N 76°07′55″E), with an average elevation of 563 meters (1847 feet) above sea level. Muddebihal is 80 km/49.7 miles away from the main district city of Bijapur, and 500 km/310.68 miles from the state capital, Bangalore. The nearest major railway station to Muddebihal is at Almatti (23 km), and the nearest airport is at Kalaburagi (184 km), Hyderabad 350 km

== Demographics ==
As of the 2001 Indian census, Muddebihal had a population of 28,219, which categorizes it as a Class III town. It has a total area of 8.25 km^{2}. The population is evenly split, with males constituting 51% of the population, and females 49%, while 14% of the population is under 6 years of age. The average literacy rate of Muddebihal is 67%, which is higher than the national average of 59.5%: male literacy is 75%, and female literacy is 58%. The economy is dependent on agriculture, with the main crops consisting of Ground nuts, Sunflowers, Bajra, and wheat. The average summer temperature is 42 °C, while the average winter temperature is 28 °C.

=== Muddebihal Religion Data 2011 ===
Population, 34,217

Hindu, 62.70%

Muslim, 34.21%

www.census2011.co.in

== Muddebihal Town Municipal Council ==
Muddebihal Municipality was first established in 1973. It includes 23 wards, 23 elected members and five nominated members.

== Education ==
=== Primary schools ===
There are both government-run and private schools in Muddebihal, and the private schools may be partly aided by the government. Prior to 1985 there were only a few schools in the town: M. G.M.K English Medium Primary School, Sarkari Kannada Boys Primary School, Sarkari URDU Boys Primary School, Sarkari Kannada Girls Primary School, Sarkari URDU Girls Primary School, and Jnana Bharati Vidya Mandir. After 1990 many new Kannada and English primary schools were established. For example, Jnana Bharati Vidya Mandir, and Pinjara School were started in 2004 respectively.

=== High schools ===
M.G.M.K English Medium Highschool, V. B. C. High School, the premier high school, was founded by Gangamma Chiniwar. It was the only high school until Mutayna High School was established in 1986. Jnana Bharati Vidya Mandir another high school, teaches the Hindu culture and Sanskrit. Other schools in the area include Anjuma High School, was founded by Anjuman-e-Islam Committee in 1962. The alumni of V. B. C. High School hold very high positions in both the Government and private sectors.

=== Colleges ===
The establishment of the M.G.V.C. College in 1969, through the "Shrimati Gangamma Veerappa Chiniwar Vidya Prasarak Trust" fulfilled the need in Muddebihal and the surrounding rural area for an institute of higher learning. The Trust was formed when Matoshri Gangamma Veerappa Chiniwar donated her property to a trust for the betterment of education. M.G.V.C. College is affiliated with Rani Channamma University, Belgaum and awards the following bachelor's degrees:

- B.A. in History, Economics, Political Science
- B.A. in History, Economics, Sociology
- B.Sc. in Chemistry, Botany, Zoology
- B.Sc. in Physics, Chemistry, Mathematics
- B.Com. (Regular)

The trust has also established the following institutions in Muddebihal, which are instrumental in imparting high quality education and training to thousands of children from impoverished families:

- M.G.V.C. Arts, Commerce & Science College
- M.G.V.C. Arts, Commerce & Science P U College
- M.G.V.C. JOC Courses in Library Science, Sericulture and NTC
- Gangamata Balamandir
- Gangamata I.T.I
- M.G.V.C.T.T.I (D.Ed.) College
- Teacher Education Institute awarding D.Ed degrees - from 2004-05.

== Villages ==
Villages in Muddebihal Taluk

- Abbihal
- Advi Hulagabal
- Advi Somnal
- Agasabal
- Alkoppa
- Alur
- Amaragol
- Arasanal
- Areshankar
- Aremural
- Bailkur
- Balabatti
- Baladinni
- Balaganur
- Balawat
- Bangaragund
- Banoshi
- Basarkod
- Bavoor
- Belur

- Bhantnur
- Bidarkundi
- Bijjur
- Bilebhavi
- Bolawad
- Bommanahalli
- Budihal P.N
- Chalami
- Chavanbhavi
- Chirchankal
- Chokavi
- Chondi
- Devarhulagabal
- Devoor
- Dhavalagi
- Donkamadu
- Fatepur P.T
- GadiSomanal
- Gangur
- Garasangi

- Geddalamari
- Ghalapuji
- Gonal P.N.
- Gonal S.H
- Gotakhindaki
- Gudadinni
- Gudihal
- Gudnal
- Gundakanal
- Gundakarjagi
- Guttihal
- Hadagali
- Hadaginal
- Hadalageri
- Hagaragund
- Hallur
- Handargall
- Handral
- Harindral
- Harnal

- Hiremural
- Hirur
- Hokrani
- Hosahalli
- Hullur
- Hunakunti
- Huvinahalli
- Inchagal
- Ingalagi
- Ingalgeri
- Jainapur
- Jakkeral
- Jalapur
- Jammaladinni
- Jangamural
- Jettagi
- Kaladevanahalli
- Kalagi
- Kamaldinni
- Kandaganur

- Karaganur
- Kashinakunti
- Kavadimatti
- Kesapur
- Khanapur
- Khanikeri
- Khilarahatti
- Kodaganur
- Kolur
- Konnur
- Koppa
- Kuchabal
- Kunchaganur
- Kuntoji
- Kyatanadoni
- Kyatanal
- Lakkundi
- Lingadalli
- Lotageri
- Madari

- Madikeshirur
- Madinal
- Maileshwar
- Malagaladinni
- Maskanal
- Masuti
- Matakal D
- Mavinbhavi
- Minajagi
- Mudnal
- Mudur
- Mukihal
- Nadahalli
- Nagabenal
- Nagarabetta
- Nagaral
- Nagur
- Nalatawad
- Navadagi
- Nebageri

- Nerabenchi
- Padekanur
- Peerapur
- Rakkasagi
- Rudagi
- Salawadagi
- Sarur
- Shellagi
- Shirol
- Shivapur
- Shidalabhavi
- Siddapur P.N
- Siddapur P.T
- Sultanpur
- Takkalaki
- Tamadaddi
- Tangadagi
- Tapalkatti
- Taranal
- Tumbagi

- Vanahalli
- Wadawadagi
- Wanakihal
- Yalagur
- Yaragalla
- Yarazeri
- Kapanur
- Karkur

== See also ==
- Bijapur
- Sindagi
- Basavana Bagewadi
- Kudalasangama
- Bagalkot
- Karnataka
