= Sindagi =

- Town
- Location in Karnataka, India Sindagi (India)
- Coordinates: 16.92°N 76.234°E
- Country: India
- State: Karnataka
- Region: Bayalu Seeme
- District: Bijapur District
- Elevation: 500 m (1,600 ft)

Population (2011)
  - Total: 40,000

Languages
  - Official language: Kannada
- Time zone: UTC+5:30 (IST)
- PIN: 586128
- Area code: +91-8488
- ISO 3166 code: IN-KA
- Vehicle registration: KA:28
- Website: karnataka.gov.in www.sindagitown.mrc.gov.in

Sindagi or Sindhagi is a city and taluk in Bijapur district in the Indian state of Karnataka, about 60 km to the east of Bijapur.

== Geography ==
Sindagi is located at 16.92°N 76.23°E. It has an average elevation of 500 metres (1640 feet). Sindagi is 60 km/37.28 miles away from the main district city of Bijapur, and 545 km/338.95 miles from the state capital, Bangalore. The nearest major railway station to Sindagi is at Indi (50 km), and the nearest airport is at Kalaburagi (96 km). National Highway 50.runs rgeough the town.

== Demographics ==
As of 2011 India census, Sindagi had a population of 53,213. Males constitute 51% of the population and females 49%. Sindagi has a middle range literacy rate of 61%. Male literacy is 69%, and female literacy is 55%. 16% of the population is under 6 years.

=== Sindagi Religion Data 2011 ===
The population of Sindagi town was 37,226, as per the 2011 census by government of India. Hindus constitute 69.26% of the population, while Muslims closely follow with 30.12%.

Religion in Sindagi (2011)
| Religion |
| Hinduism | 69.26% |
| Islam | 30.12% |

== See also ==
- Bijapur
- Muddebihal
- Basavana Bagewadi
- Kalaburagi
- Indi
- Bagalkot
