= Bijapur district, Karnataka =

Bijapur district
- District of Karnataka
- Vijayapura district
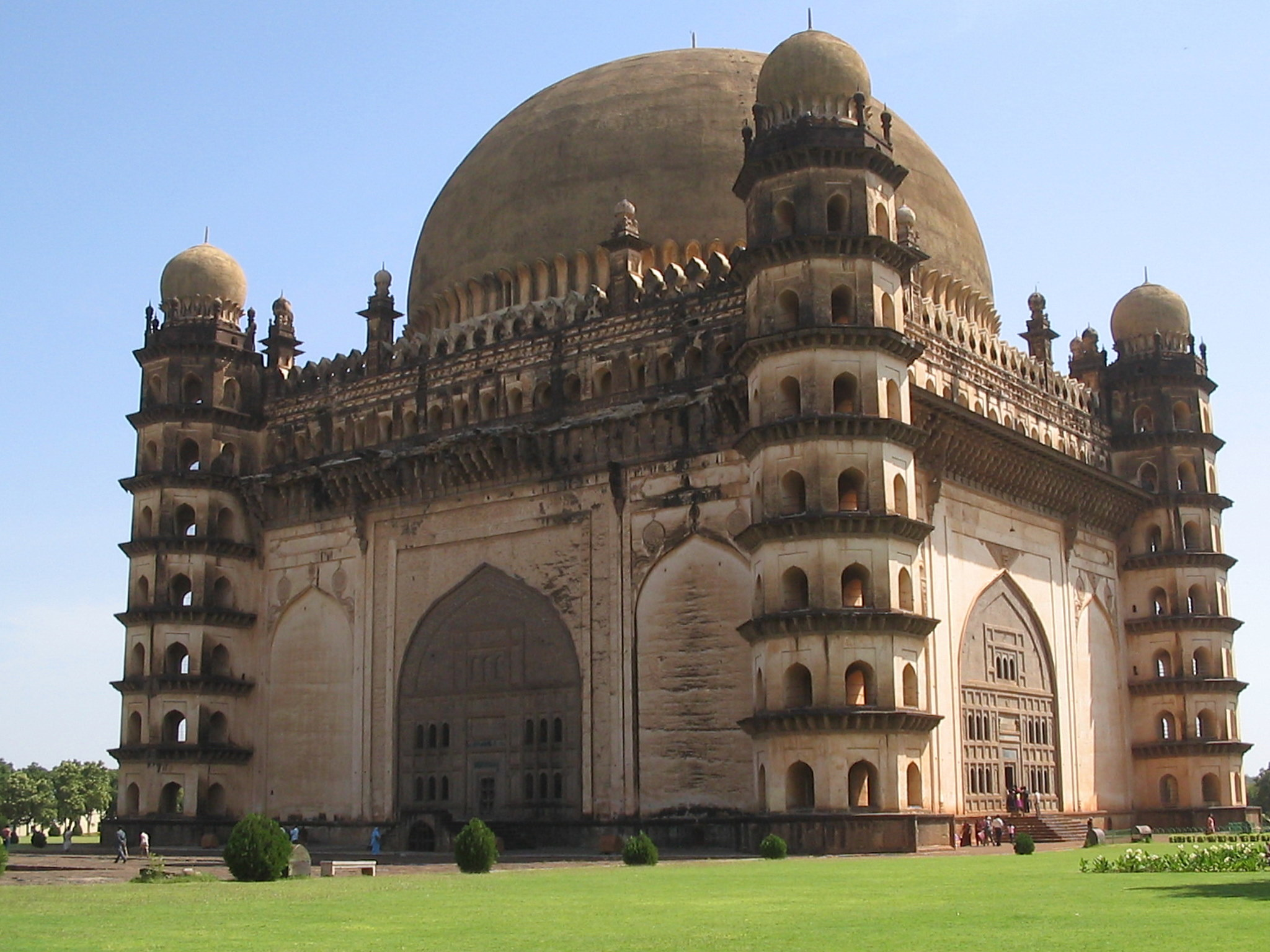
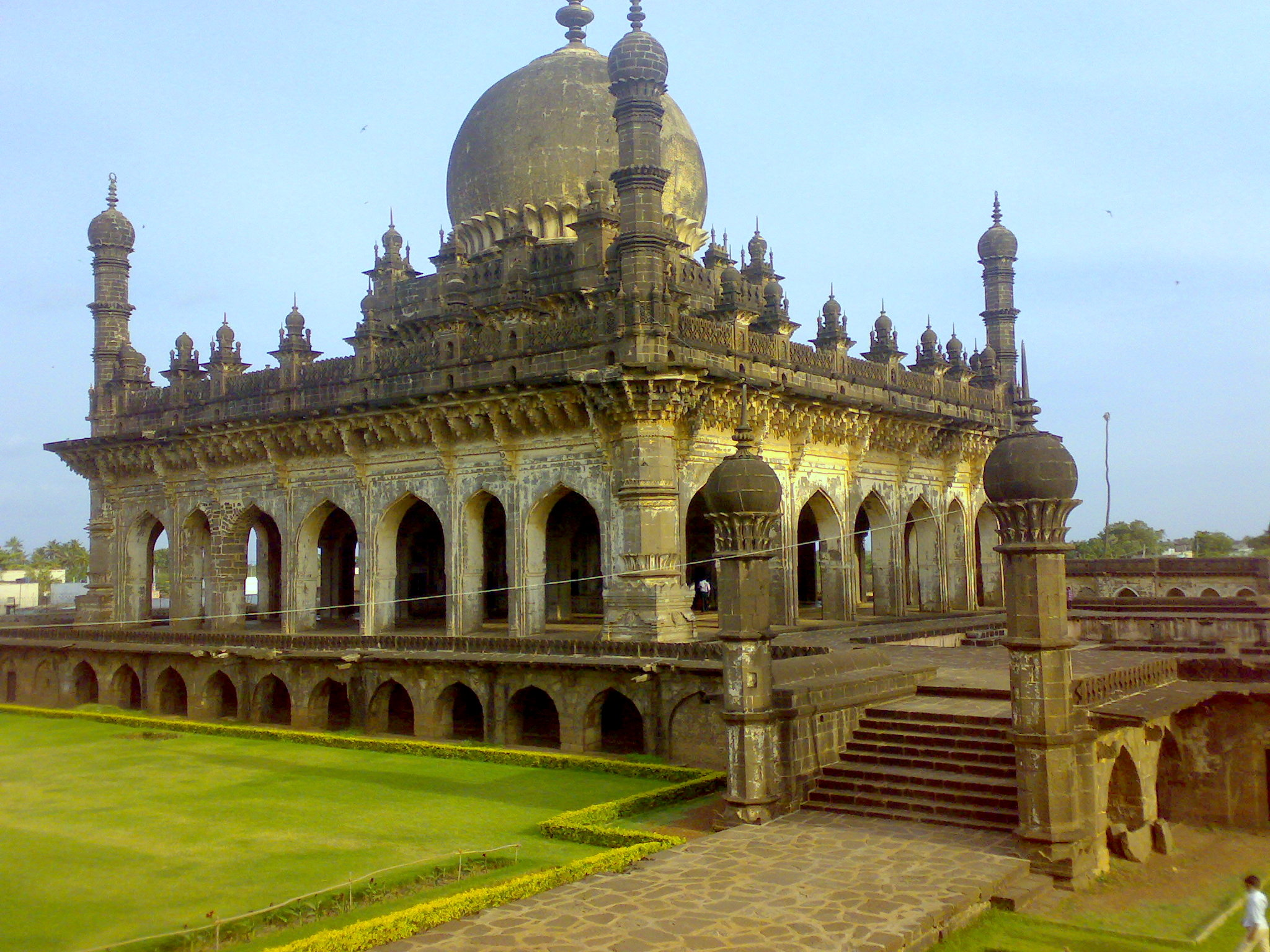
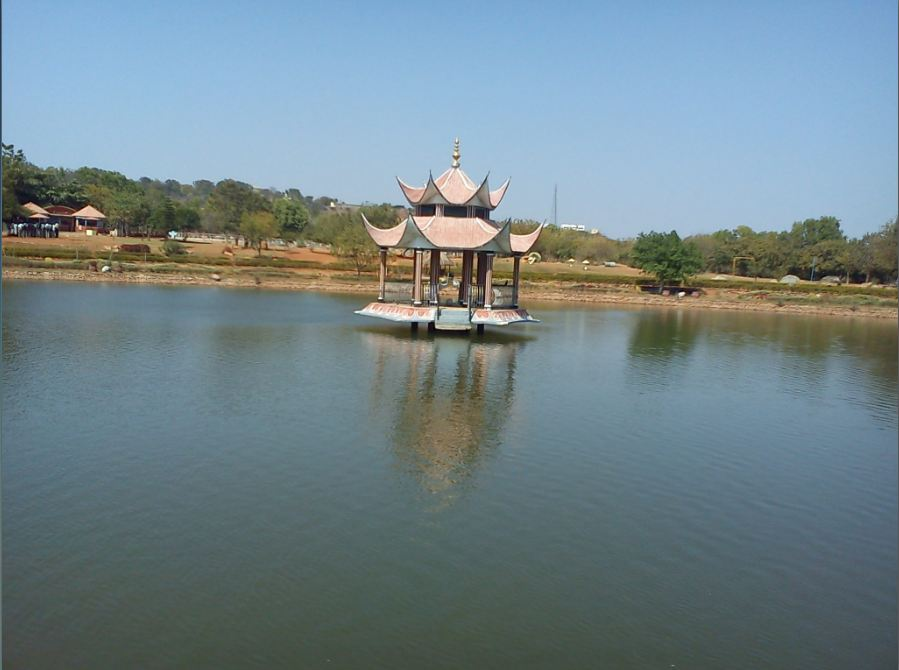
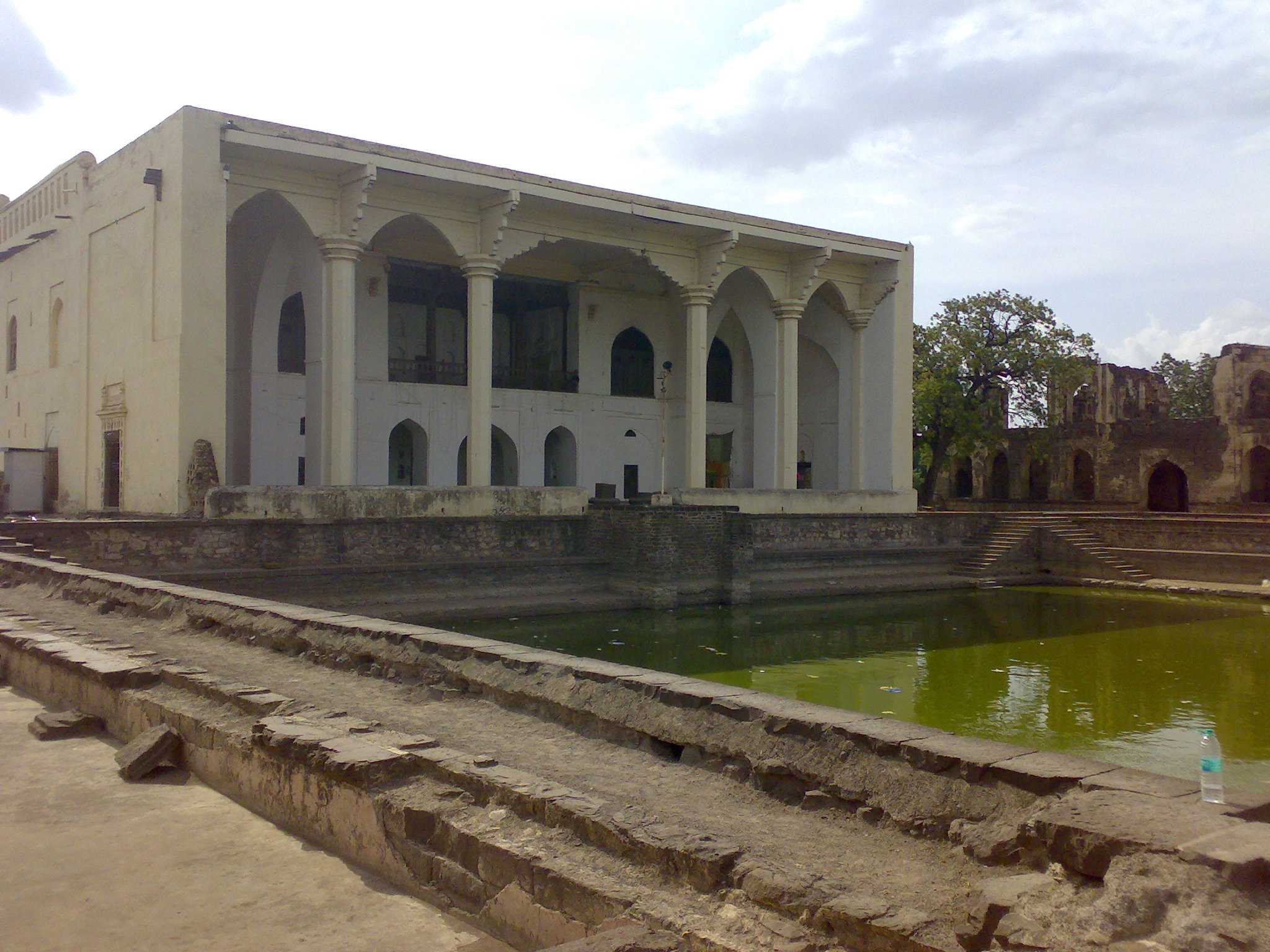
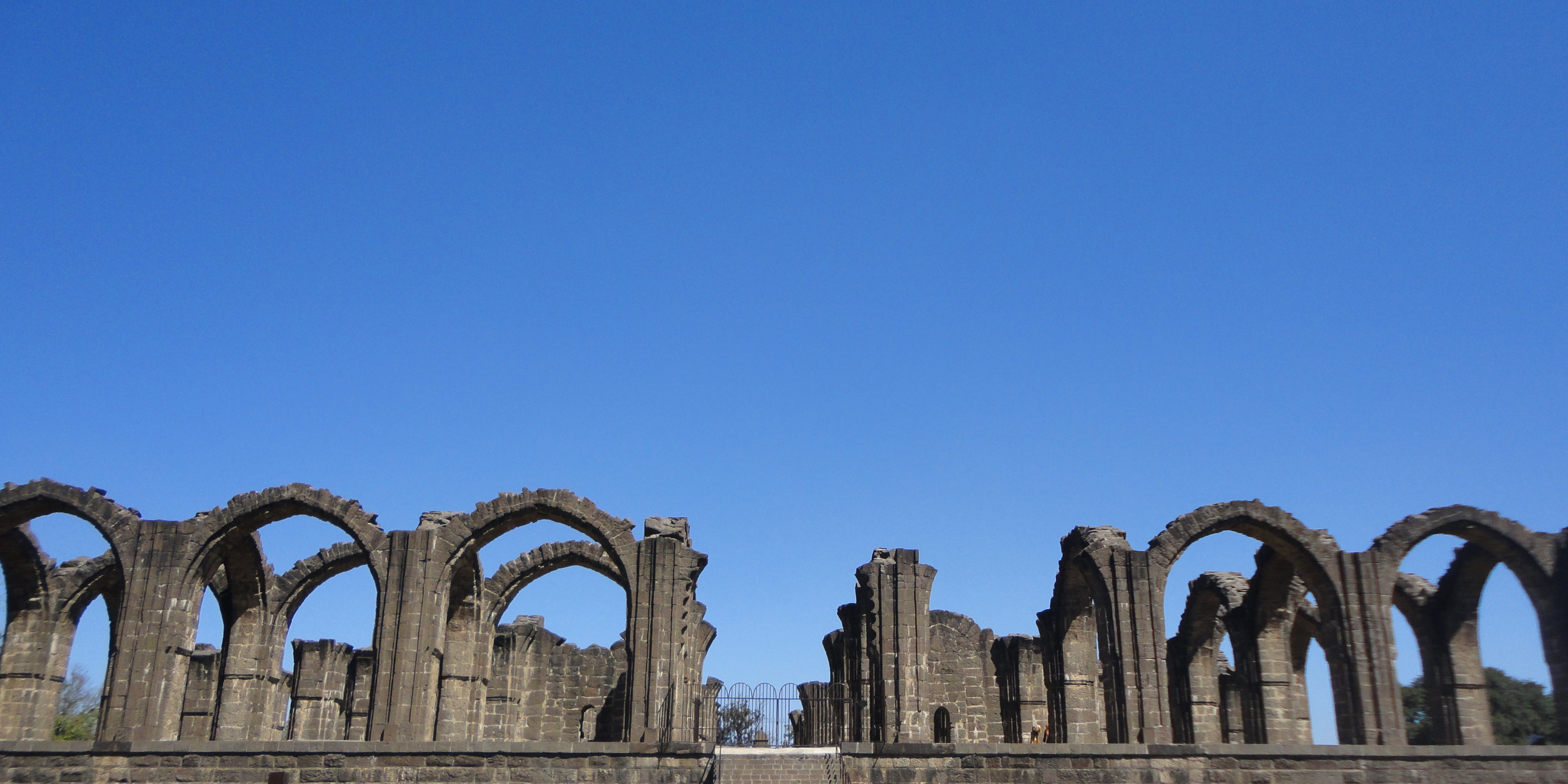
- Clockwise from top-left: Gol Gumbaz, Ibrahim Rauza, Asar Mahal, Bara Kaman, Almatti Dam
- Interactive map of Bijapur district
- Coordinates: 16.82°N 75.72°E
- Country: India
- State: Karnataka
- Established: 1 November 1956
- Headquarters: Bijapur
- Talukas: Bijapur, Basavana Bagewadi, Sindagi, Indi, Muddebihal, Nidagundi, Talikote, Babaleshwar, Tikota, Chadchan, Devara Hipparagi, Kolhar, Almel

Government
  - Deputy Commissioner: T Bhoobalan (IAS)
  - CEO: Rishi Anand, (IAS)
  - District in-charge minister: M. B. Patil

Area
  - Total: 10,498 km^{2} (4,053 sq mi)

Population (2011)
  - Total: 2,177,331
  - Density: 207.40/km^{2} (537.17/sq mi)

Languages
  - Official: Kannada
- Time zone: UTC+5:30 (IST)
- Telephone code: + 91 (0) 8352
- ISO 3166 code: IN-KA
- Vehicle registration: Bijapur KA- 28
- Website: vijayapura.nic.in/en/

Bijapur district, officially known as Vijayapura district, is a district in the state of Karnataka in India. The city of Bijapur is the headquarters of the district, and is located 530 km northwest of Bengaluru. Bijapur is well known for the great monuments of historical importance built during the Adil Shahi dynasty.

== History ==
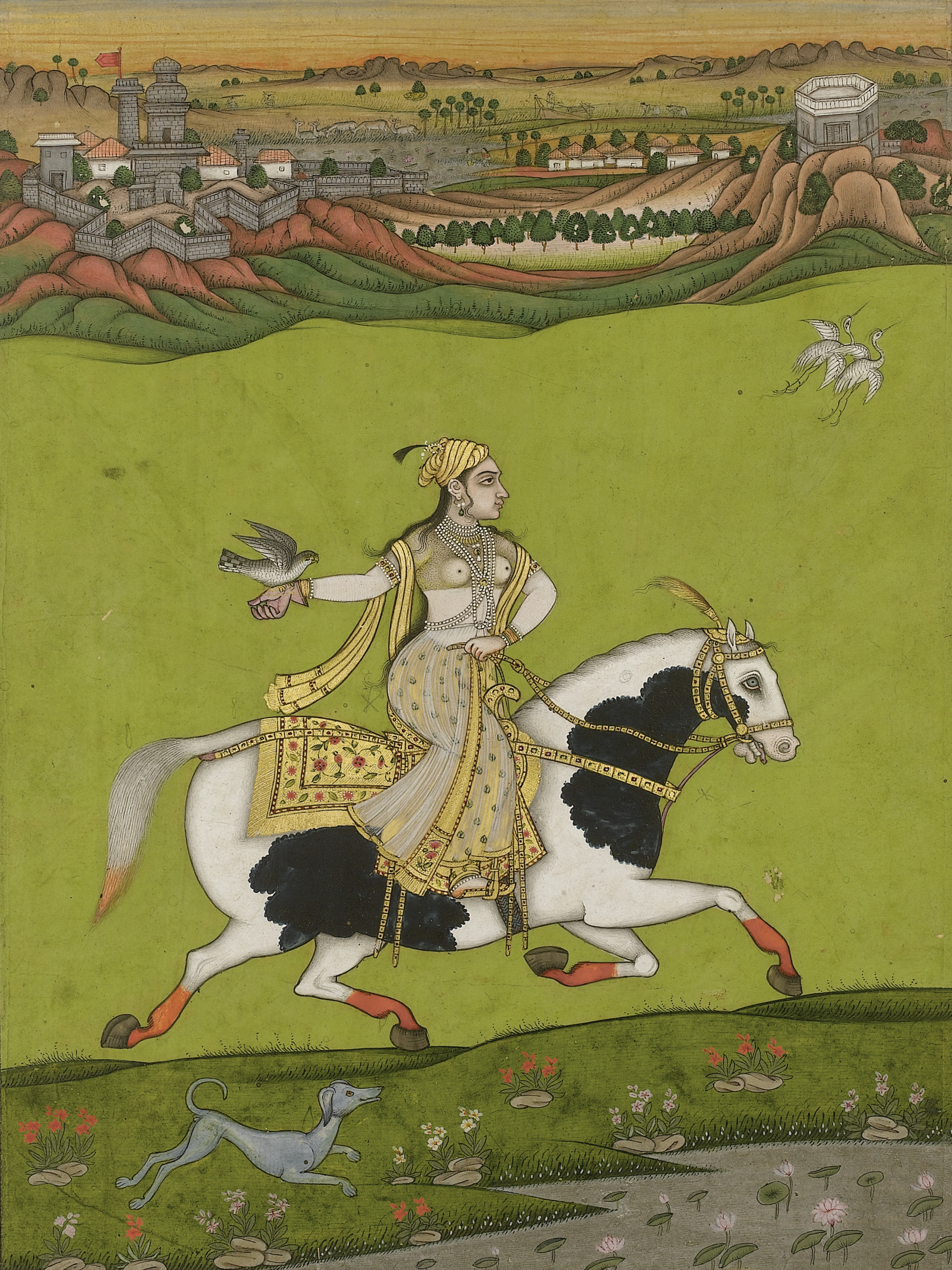
Chand Bibi, the regent of Bijapur (1580-90)

While archaeological evidence indicates that the area was settled by the late Paleolithic, the legendary founding of the city of Bijapur was in the late 900s under Tailapa II, who had been the Rashtrakuta governor of Tardavadi, and after the destruction to the empire caused by the invasion of the Paramara of Malwa, declared his independence and went on to found the empire of the Chalukyas of Kalyani, where the city was referred as Vijayapura ("City of Victory"). By the late 13th century, the area had come under the influence of the Khalji Sultanate. In 1347, the area was conquered by the Bahmani Sultanate of Gulbarga. By this time the city was being referred as Vijapur or Bijapur.

In 1518, the Bahmani Sultanate split into five splinter states known as the Deccan sultanates, one of which was Bijapur, ruled by the kings of the Adil Shahi dynasty (1490–1686). The city of Bijapur owes much of its greatness to Yusuf Adil Shah, the founder of the independent Bijapur Sultanate. The rule of this dynasty ended in 1686, when Bijapur was conquered by the Mughal emperor Aurangzeb. In 1724 the Nizam of Hyderabad established his independence in the Deccan, and included Bijapur within his dominions. In 1760, the Nizam suffered a defeat by the Marathas, and ceded the region of Bijapur to the Maratha Peshwa. After the 1818 defeat of the Peshwa by the British in the Third Anglo-Maratha War, Bijapur passed into the hands of the British East India Company, and was assigned to the princely state of Satara.

In 1848 the territory of Satara, along with Bijapur, was annexed to Britain's Bombay Presidency when the last ruler died without a male heir. The British carved a new district by the name Kaladagi. The district included present-day Bijapur and Bagalkot districts. Bijapur was made the administrative headquarters of the district in 1885, when the headquarters were moved from Bagalkot. After India's Independence in 1947, the district became part of Bombay state and was reassigned to Mysore state, later Karnataka, in 1956. The former southern taluks of the district were separated in 1997 to form Bagalkot District.

The citadel, built by Yusuf Adil Shah, a mile (2 km) in circuit, is of great strength, well built of the most massive materials, and encompassed by a ditch 100 yards wide, formerly supplied with water, but now nearly filled up with rubbish, so that its original depth cannot be discovered. Within the citadel are the remains of both Hindu temples and old mosques, which prove that Bijapur was an important town. The fort, which was completed by Au Adil Shah in 1566, is surrounded by a wall 6 m. in circumference. This wall is from 30 to 50 ft (10 to 15 m) high, and is strengthened with 96 massive bastions of various designs. In addition there are ten others at the various gateways. The width is about 25 ft (8 m); from bastion to bastion runs a battlemented curtained wall about 10 ft (3 m) high. The whole is surrounded by a deep moat 30 to 40 ft (10 to 12 m) broad. Inside these walls the Bijapur kings bade deference to all comers. Outside the walls are the remains of a vast city, now for the most part in ruins, but the innumerable tombs, mosques, caravanserais and other edifices, which have resisted the havoc of time, afford abundant evidence of the ancient splendour of the place.

Badami, Aihole, and Pattadakal, near Bijapur, are noted for their historical temples in the Chalukya architectural style.

== Geography ==
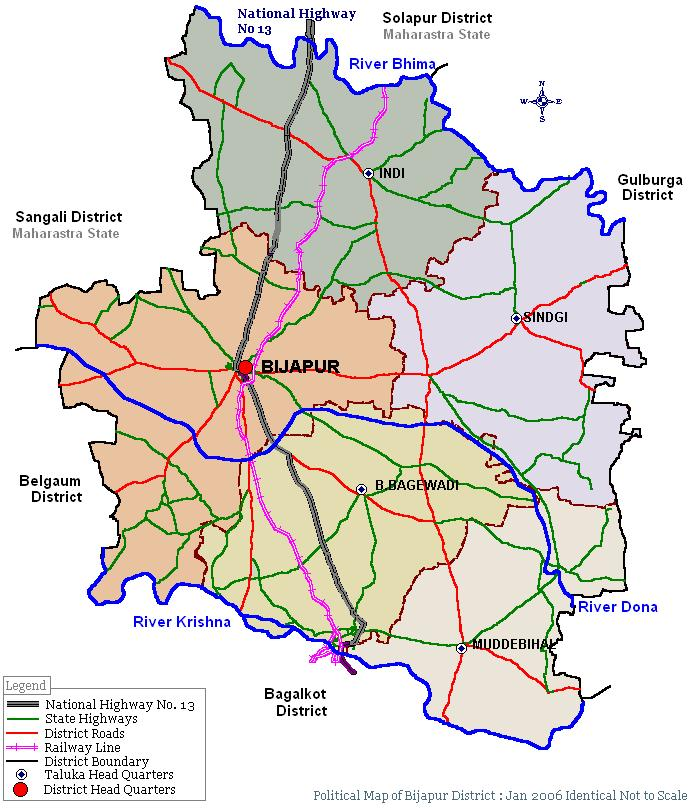
Political map of the Bijapur district

Bijapur District has an area of 10541 square kilometres. It is bounded on the east by Gulbarga and Yadgir districts, on the southeast by Raichur district, on the south and southwest by Bagalkot District, on the west by Belgaum district, and on the northwest and north by Sangli and Solapur districts of Maharahstra.

It comprises 5.49% of Karnataka state area. It lies between 15 x 50 and 17 x 28 North Latitude and 74 x 54 and 76 x 28 East Longitude. The administrative headquarters and chief town is Bijapur.

Geographically, the district lies in the tract of the Deccan Plateaus. The lands of the district can be broadly divided into three zones: the northern belt consisting of the northern parts of Bijapur Taluks of Indi and Sindagi; the central belt consisting of Bijapur city; the southern belt consisting of the rich alluvial plains of the Krishna Rivers parted from the central belt by a stretch of barren Trap. The northern belt is a succession of low rolling uplands without much vegetation, gently rounded and falling into intermediate narrow valleys. The upland soil being shallow, the villages are generally confined to the banks of the streams and are far away from one another. The Don River Valley has plains and consists of rich tracks of deep black soils stretching from west to east in the central part of the district. Across the Krishna River is a rich plain crossed from west to east by two lines of sandstone hills. Further south towards Badami and southwest to east by two lines of sandstone hills. Further south towards Badami and southwest of Hunagund, the hills increase the number and the black soil gives way to the red

There are 34 rain gauge stations in Bijapur District. The average annual rainfall for the district is 553 mm with 37.2 rainy days. The monsoon generally breaks in the district during June and lasts till October. The highest mean monthly rainfall is 149 mm in the month of September and lowest is 3 mm in February. The annual rainfall variation in the district is marginal from place to place.

The soils of Bijapur District can be categorised as a low to moderately yielding area (1000 to 8000 L/h) 72.2% of district falling in this category. From considerable part of the district (9%) poor yielding (less than 1000 L/h sources) or non–feasible areas have been reported. The talukas having largest poor yielding area, are Muddebihal (19%) followed by Indi (15%), Bijapur and sindagi (13% each), Basavan Bagewadi (4%). Low yielding areas (1000 to 4000 L/h source) in the district constitute about 40% of the district, with the largest being Basavan Bagewadi (54%) and smallest in Indi taluka Moderate yields (4000 to 8000 L/h source) are reported from 36% of the district, highest being in Bijapur with 70% of the area, and lowest being in Sindagi with 19% of the taluka. High yielding areas (more than 8000 L/h sources) over 15% of the district. The smallest area under this category are in Sindagi Taluka (2% each) and largest is in Muddebihal (29% each) where very lengthy contact zones occur between traps and other formations

On the basis of projections from this information, the main parameters affecting water quality in Bijapur can be expected to be brackishness (salinity) and hardness (PH). Salinity affects the district in high to low groundwater problem areas and occurs in areas all along the major and minor river courses and stream courses.

=== Trees ===
Bijapur district is known for its tree cover. It contains some of the oldest trees in Karntaka . It also has attracted international attention for its successful campaign to reforest the district, which enabled wildlife to recover and groundwater to recharge as well.

- Adansonia digitata-Malvaceae in Bijapur taluk, which is 600 years old;
- Adansonia digitata-Malvaceae in Bijapur taluk, 359 years old;
- Tamarindus indica (tamarind) in Devarahipparagi village of Bijapur – 883 years old;
- Azadirachta indica (Bevu) – at T Venkatapura in Chikkaballapur district 200 years old;
- Ficus benghalensis (Alada mara) in Chickkahalli in Mysore taluk – 260 years old;
- Ficus religiosa (peepal) in Manasagangothri of Mysore – 160 years old;
- 'Kempu boorga mara' in Palace Gate of Mysore – 130 years old;
- Ficus benghalensis (Doddalada mara) – Kethohalli in Bengaluru, 400 years old;
- Araucaria cookie – Lalbagh, 140 years old;
- Pilali (Ficus Micro Corpus) – in Banavasi of Shimoga district – 400 years old.

How the Adansonia digitata tree came to Bijapur

Two of these trees, commonly known as the baobab trees, have been listed and identified in Bijapur. One is near the Ibrahim Roza monument in Bijapur with a girth of 10.84 m and height of 5 m and another at Yogapur Dargah, near Bijapur, which is believed to be at least 359 years old with 9.2 m girth and seven m height. Both these trees were planted during the reign of Adil Shahis. Experts say that the kings of Adil Shahi dynasty were all fascinated by nature, and these particular saplings of the Adansonia digitata had been imported from Turkey to be planted in Bijapur. The kings were very particular about the nurturing of these plants and took care of their needs like their own children.

== Demographics ==
Historical population
Year	Pop.	±% p.a.
1901	436,892	—
1911	535,837	+2.06%
1921	491,201	−0.87%
1931	544,386	+1.03%
1941	605,235	+1.07%
1951	735,033	+1.96%
1961	888,576	+1.92%
1971	1,053,940	+1.72%
1981	1,250,777	+1.73%
1991	1,537,731	+2.09%
2001	1,806,918	+1.63%
2011	2,177,331	+1.88%

Religion in Bijapur district (2011)
Hinduism	82.07%
Islam	16.97%
Jainism	0.40%
Other or not stated	0.56%

According to the 2011 census Bijapur district, Karnataka has a population of 2,177,331, roughly equal to the nation of Latvia or the US state of New Mexico. This gives it a ranking of 210th in India (out of a total of 640). The district has a population density of 207 inhabitants per square kilometre (540/sq mi) . Its population growth rate over the decade 2001-2011 was 20.38%. Bijapur has a sex ratio of 954 females for every 1000 males, and a literacy rate of 67.2%. 23.05% of the population lives in urban areas. Scheduled Castes and Scheduled Tribes made up 20.34% and 1.81% of the population respectively.

Bijapur district has a population of 1,806,918 (2001 census), an increase of 17.63% since the 1991 census. The district is 21.92% urban.

Languages of Bijapur district (2011)
1. Kannada (75.0%)
2. Urdu (15.6%)
3. Lambadi (5.13%)
4. Marathi (2.47%)
5. Others (1.87%)

At the time of the 2011 census, 74.96% of the population spoke Kannada, 15.57% Urdu, 5.13% Lambadi and 2.47% Marathi as their first language.

== Government and politics ==
=== Political scenario ===
The Bijapur district is represented by eight members in the Karnataka Legislative Assembly (Lower House) and in the (Upper House) Karnataka Legislative Council five members. A single member represents the whole district in the lower house of Parliament Lok Sabha. The MP for Bijapur is Ramesh Jigajinagi of the Bharatiya Janata Party

The assembly constituencies under the Bijapur district are

- Muddebihal
- Devara Hippargi
- Bijapur (Bijapur Urban)
- Basavana Bagewadi
- Babaleshwar
- Indi
- Sindagi

=== Divisions ===
Talukas of Bijapur District

Bijapur District is divided into five talukas and 199 panchayat villages.

- Bijapur, with forty-six panchayat villages,
- Basavana Bagewadi, with thirty-eight panchayat villages,
- Sindagi, with forty panchayat villages,
- Indi, with forty-four panchayat villages, and,
- Muddebihal, with thirty-one panchayat villages.

=== Cities and towns in Bijapur District ===
- Basavana Bagevadi
- Bijapur
- Indi
- Muddebihal
- Sindagi
- Talikota
- Nagathan
- Chadchan
- Almel

=== Villages in Bijapur District ===
- Arekeri
- Kolhar (Old)
- Nagathan

== Economy ==
Farming and agriculture related business is the main occupation for many people in the district. Of the total geographical area of 10,530 square kilometres, 7,760 square kilometres is available for cultivation which is 74% of the total area, while areas under forest account for only 0.19% of the total area. Only 17.3% of the net cultivable area is irrigated and the balance 82.7% of the area has to depend on the monsoon.

The cropping pattern in the district reveals that food crops like jowar, maize, bajra and wheat among cereals, red gram, Bengal gram and green gram among pulses are major crops cultivated in the district. The major oilseed crops are sunflower, groundnut and safflower. Horticulture crops like grapes, pomegranate, ber, guave sapota, lime are also grown. A recent trend shows that there is a low shift towards fruit crops like Pomegranate and grapes of the total area of 8,610 square kilometres. Covered during 2002-03 cereals occupy about 55.2% by oilseeds 24.5% pulse 15.6% and other commercial crops like cotton and sugarcane about 4.8%. There is a slight shift towards commercial crops like cotton and sugarcane over last 2 years. The land holding pattern in the district indicates that small and marginal farmers account for 4% of total land holdings and 0.6% of the total land, semi-medium for 27.5% with 10.1% of total land while 68% of the holdings are above 20,000 m^{2}, accounting for 89.3% of land. Many small scale industries are working in the district however no large scale industry can be found in the district.

Classification of Labor Force	No. of Workers
Cultivators or Farmers	2,21,060
Agricultural Laborers (Non-Land Owners)	2,87,778
Artisans	17,776
Home based / Cottage Industries	18,232
Services and Other sector	1,95,573

== Culture, traditions and attractions ==
=== Hinduism ===
There are Smarthas and Vaishnavas as well as Veerashaivas among them. A few Hindu families in Bijapur district have modelled their religious life after the Lingayats. Among the Brahmins in Bijapur district, the Deshastha Brahmins are found in large numbers.

Jayatirtha (1345–1387), a prominent dvaita saint who is also known as the 'Teekacharya' lived in Mangalwedha propagated the Madhva philosophy in the region. He wrote commentaries on each of the work of Madhvacharya. The Madhwa pontiffs established their mutts in various places in North Karnataka region. Thus the territory of Bijapur, Belgaum, Dharwar, Raichur and the adjoining areas is a stronghold of the Uttaradi Matha and the Raghavendra Mutt.

=== Sufism ===
Bijapur has been well known as the Madinatul Auliya (Sufis) or the City of Sufi Saints. Various Auliya (Sufi Saints) have visited Bijapur and most of them made this city their resting place too. Auliya of almost all spiritual lineage like Qadriya, Sakafya, Ashraifya, Shuttariya, Nasqbhandiya, Chisitya are to be found in this city.

The following is a brief list of notable Sufis.

- Peer Mahabri Khandayat
- Hazrat Haji Rumi
- Shaikh Muntajeeb Qadri (alias maan Qadri)
- Qutubul Aktab Sayedina Hashimpeer Dastageer
- Syed Shah Mohammad Hussaini Qaudri Tazeemtark
- Khwaja Ameenuddin Chisty

=== Attractions and tourism ===
Bijapur is rich in historical attractions. For the many attractions in Bijapur city, including Gol Gumbaz, the Jumma Masjid mosque, the Uppali Buruj tower and the tomb of Ibrahim Adil Shah II (Ibrahim Rauza), see Attractions of Bijapur city.

- Shiva Statue: The 85-foot tall statue is three kilometres on Ukkali Road from the city of Bijapur. A round temple is built underneath the huge idol weighing 1,500 tonnes.it is the Third tallest Shiva idol next only to the one at Murdeshwar in Uttara Kannada district.
- Parshwanath Basadi: About three kilometres from the city near the dargah is a basadi of Parshwanath. The black stone idol is about one meter high and of beautiful workmanship. A serpent with 1,008 small hoods spread over the deity as umbrella is delicately carved. Some years back while digging a mound, the figure is stated to have been unearthed.
- Golageri - 78 km from the city, contains the Gollaleshwar Dev temple.
- Toravi - In the western direction of the district town of Bijapur at about 8 km one can locate Toravi Village in which historical Laxmi-Narasimha Cave Temple, Village Goddess Mahalaxmi Temple and Navarasapura Sangeet Mahal which are important tourist destinations that attracts the tourists.
- Basavana Bagewadi – 43 km from the city, is the birthplace of Basava, a point of pilgrimage for people of the Lingayat faith. Their Sri Sangameshwar Temple is nearby in Bagalkot District.
- Almatti Dam – 56 km, from the city.
- Korwar -60 km from Vijapur, Shri Korwareshwar Temple at Korwar, Sindagi taluk. This temple is established by Shakaracharya.

Yankanchi : this village is located around 75 km from Vijayapur Contains Shree DawalMalika Temple.

=== Art and culture ===
Navaraspur was the auditorium of the Adil Shahs, it is about 10 km outside the city limits. The ruins of the site are still visible. Every year the local administration organises the Navaraspur Festival to attract tourists. Great personalities like Bhimsen Joshi, Ustad Alla Rakha, Zakir Hussain, Mallikarjun Mansur, Gangubai Hangal and many more have performed in this festival.

- Shri Shiddeshwar Temple situated at the heart of the city is a holy place for Hindus which is also a very beautiful tourist place to visit. During Makar Sankranti an annual fare is organised by Shri Siddheshwar Temple. This fair is well known for the cattle market which is organised outside the city limits. Farmers from neighbouring villages and even some parts of Maharashtra come to trade in cattle. During this period fireworks display will be held.
- The Kittur Rani Chenamma Theatre still stages dramas by professionals. However, due to the decrease in the patronage the drama companies are closing down. Ninasam, (Shri Nilakanteshwara Nataka Sangha), an experimental theatre troupe started by K. V. Subbanna, visited Bijapur and showcased their art during the Ninasam "Tirugata" (meaning: Wandering in Kannada). Kandgal Hanumantharayara Ranga Mandira, on the station road, serves as the centre of art of culture. During summer many workshops on theatre are held at this auditorium under the sponsorship of the local administration.

== Transport ==
Bijapur is connected by rail and road. There is a non-commercial airport at Solapur (IATA: SSE), some 100 kilometres to the north. The nearest commercial airport, with flights by Indian Airways and Jet Airways, is at Belgaum (IATA: IXG), some 200 kilometres away. The helipad at the Sainik School is used only when government guests or public office bearers visit the district and is not open for general public.

Bijapur has a broad gauge station of South Western Railways about two kilometres from the city centre of Bijapur, with direct train connections to Bengaluru, Mumbai, Hyderabad, Hubli, Solapur and Shirdi.

The state owned North West Karnataka State Road Transport Corporation runs buses to all parts of the district. Local buses run within Bijapur city limits as well as villages within a 15 km radius. The frequency of these buses are higher in comparison to those buses which ply on longer routes. Private tour operators also run luxury bus services from the Bijapur city to Bengaluru, Hubli, Dharwad and Belgaum. Within the city Tata Sumo, Tata Indica and Tempo Trax are used as taxis by local operators. Autos and Tongas are still popular mode of local transport in the city. Cycle Rickshaws are used only to transport materials and people hardly ever travel by them.

== Education ==
Of late Bijapur is emerging as a hub for professional education. Previously (i.e. before the 1980s) there were very few professional educational institutions. Along with the professional colleges there are many colleges which provide under-graduate and post-graduate degrees in the faculty of arts, science and social-sciences. Many of these colleges except professional are affiliated to Rani Chennamma University Belagavi viz, B.L.D.E.A'S A.S.PATIL COLLEGE OF COMMERCE(Autonomous)MBA Programme, Bijapur. Rani Chennamma University has a Post-Graduation Centre at Bijapur also. Engineering colleges are affiliated to Visvesvaraya Technological University viz, B.L.D.E.A's V.P. Dr. P.G. Halakatti College of Engineering and Technology and SECAB College of Engineering and Technology and Medical colleges are affiliated to Rajiv Gandhi University of Health Sciences. viz, BLDE (Deemed to be University), B.M.Patil Medical College, Hospital and Research Centre and Al-Ameel Medical College, Hospital and Research Centre, Sainik School, Bijapur and Karnataka State Women's University. Various post-graduate courses like MBA, MCA are conducted here. Additionally Bijapur boasts of the only Sainik school in the whole state. This is a residential school preparing cadets for the Defence forces.

The Bijapur district is known for its temples, structural monuments, art and architectural heritages, archaeological sites and cave temples. With the objective to spread education in this area, Karnataka University opened its Post-Graduate Centre in 1993.

Karnataka State Women's University, established in 2003 in the city of Bijapur is the only Women's University in Karnataka dedicated exclusively for women's education. It is recognised under 2(f) and 12(B) of the UGC Act. Seventy women's colleges spread in twelve districts of North-Karnataka are affiliated to this University. The University offers various UG programmes leading to bachelor's degree in Arts, Business Administration, Computer Applications, Commerce, Education, Fashion Technology, Home Science, Physical Education, Science and Social College of agriculture (estd. 1990) under University of Agricultural Sciences, Dharwad is located 6 km away from city bus stand is one of the few institutes made for research on dry land agriculture.

== Sports ==
Off late Bijapur district has produced some of the best known Road Cyclists in the national circuit. Premalata Sureban was part of the Indian contingent at the Perlis Open '99 in Malaysia.

Dr. B.R.Ambedkar Sports complex serves as the main centre for all activities related to sports. Facilities are available in the single sports complex for track and field events, volleyball, basketball, cricket and a velodrome for cycling. Apart from the government-managed infrastructure the private trust run BLDEA's Medical and Engineering college campus has also access to the facilities for fitness and sports. It can be noted that the popular games in the rural areas are Kabaddi and Kho Kho apart from Cricket. Cricket is still popular among local youth however having a winning team of volleyball and football is a matter of prestige for all the schools and colleges.

Every year the district administration organises the Dasara Sports Meet during the Dasara festival to identify and nurture the talent of the future.

== Notable people ==
- Bhāskara II
- Basava – philosopher and a social reformer (born in Basavana Bagewadi)
- Ranna – ರನ್ನ – one of the earliest poets of Kannada language
- Raghuvarya Tirtha – 16th century Hindu philosopher and saint; 13th peetadhipathi of Uttaradi Math of Dvaita order of Vedanta
- Raghuttama Tirtha – 16th century Hindu philosopher and saint; 14th peetadhipathi of Uttaradi Math of Dvaita order of Vedanta
- B. D. Jatti
- S. R. Kanthi
- Amirbai Karnataki
- Aluru Venkata Rao
- M. M. Kalburgi
- Sunil Kumar Desai – filmmaker of Kannada film industry
- M. M. Joshi - ophthalmologist and Padma Shri recipient

== See also ==
- Sultanate of Bijapur
- Bijapur Fort

== Bibliography ==
- Eaton, Richard Maxwell (2015). The Sufis of Bijapur, 1300-1700: Social Roles of Sufis in Medieval India. Princeton University Press. ISBN 9781400868155.
