= Ramnagar =

Ramnagar may refer to the following places:

== Bangladesh ==
- Ramnagar, Bangladesh, a village in Chittagong Division
- Ramnagar Union, Jessore Sadar

== India ==
=== Jammu and Kashmir ===
- Ramnagar, Udhampur, a town in Jammu and Kashmir
  - Ramnagar Fort Udhampur
  - Ramnagar (Jammu and Kashmir Assembly constituency)
  - Ram Nagar railway station

=== Karnataka ===
- Ramanagara, a town in Karnataka
  - Ramanagara district
  - Ramanagara Assembly constituency
- Ramnagar, Basavana Bagevadi, a village in Basavana Bagevadi Taluk, Bijapur district
- Ramanagar, Belgaum District, a village in Saundatti Taluk, Belgaum district
- Ramnagar, Bijapur, a village in Bijapur Taluk, Bijapur district
- Ramnagar, Gulbarga, a village in Afzalpur Taluk, Gulbarga district
- Ramanagar, Indi, a village in Indi Taluk, Bijapur district
- Ramnagar, Uttara Kannada, a village in Supa (Joida) Taluk, Uttara Kannada district
- Ramnagar, Yadgir, a village in Shorapur Taluk, Yadgir district

=== Uttar Pradesh ===
- Ramnagar, Akhand Nagar, a village in Sultanpur district
- Ramnagar, Alapur, a town in Ambedkar Nagar district
- Ramnagar, Barabanki, a town in Barabanki district
  - Ram Nagar, Uttar Pradesh Assembly constituency
- Ramnagar, Bareilly, a village in Bareilly district
- Ramnagar, Tiloi, a village Tiloi Taluk, in Rae Bareli district
- Ramnagar, Varanasi, a city in Varanasi district
  - Ramnagar Fort

=== Uttarakhand ===
- Ramnagar, Nainital, a town in Uttarakhand
  - Ramnagar, Uttarakhand Assembly constituency
- Ramnagar Range, Nainital, a village in Bajpur tehsil, Udham Singh Nagar district
- Ramnagar, Bajpur, a village in Bajpur tehsil, Udham Singh Nagar district
- Ramnagar Range, Udham Singh Nagar, a village in Bajpur tehsil, Udham Singh Nagar district
- Ramnagar, Jaspur, a village in Jaspur tehsil, Udham Singh Nagar district
- Ramnagar, Kashipur, a village in Kashipur tehsil, Udham Singh Nagar district
- Ramnagar Danda, a village in Rishikesh tehsil, Dehradun district
- Ramnagar, Haridwar, a village in Roorkee tehsil, Haridwar district

=== West Bengal ===
- Ramnagar, Diamond Harbour, a village in South 24 Parganas district
- Ramnagar, Kulti, a town in Paschim Bardhaman district, West Bengal
- Ramnagar, Pandaveswar, a town in Paschim Bardhaman district, West Bengal
- Ramnagar, Purba Medinipur, a village in Purba Medinipur district, West Bengal, India
  - Ramnagar I, a community development block
  - Ramnagar II, a community development block
  - Ramnagar, Purba Medinipur (Vidhan Sabha constituency), in Purba Medinipur district, West Bengal
- Ramnagar, Murshidabad, a census town

=== Elsewhere in India ===
- Ramnagar, Diglipur, a village in the Andaman Islands
- Ramnagar, Visakhapatnam, in Andhra Pradesh, a neighbourhood
- Ramnagar, West Champaran, Bihar
  - Ramnagar, Paschim Champaran (Vidhan Sabha constituency), in West Champaran district
- Ramnagar, Madhya Pradesh, a former town
- Ramnagar (Pune) metro station
- Ramnagar, Hyderabad, Telangana, a suburb
- Ramnagar, Agartala, a locality in Tripura
  - Ramnagar (Tripura Vidhan Sabha constituency)
- Ramnagar, Danta Ramgarh, a village in Rajasthan
- Ram Nagar, Coimbatore, Tamil Nadu, India
- Ram Nagar metro station, Jaipur Metro
- Ram Nagar Palwal metro station, Delhi Metro

== Nepal ==
- Ramnagar, Kapilvastu
- Ramnagar, Mahottari
- Ramnagar, Nawalparasi
- Ramnagar, Saptari
- Ramnagar, Sarlahi
  - Ramnagar Rural Municipality
- Ramnagar, Parasi
- Ramnagar Bhutaha
- Ramnagar Mirchaiya

== Pakistan ==
- Rasool Nagar, formerly known as Ramnagar, a town in Punjab
  - Battle of Ramnagar

== See also ==
- Ramnagar Assembly constituency (disambiguation)
- Ramanagar (disambiguation)
- Rampur (disambiguation)
