= Ramanagar =

Ramanagar may refer to the following places in Karnataka:

- Ramanagara
  - Ramanagara district
  - Ramanagaram (Vidhana Sabha constituency)
- Ramanagar, Belgaum, a village in Saundatti Taluk, Belgaum district
- Ramanagar, Indi, a village in Indi Taluk, Bijapur district
- Ramnagar, Bijapur, a village in Bijapur Taluk, Bijapur district
- Ramnagar, Basavana Bagevadi, a village in Basavana Bagevadi Taluk, Bijapur district
- Ramnagar, Uttara Kannada, a village in Supa (Joida) Taluk, Uttara Kannada district
- Ramnagar, Gulbarga, a village in Afzalpur Taluk, Gulbarga district
- Ramnagar, Yadgir, a village in Shorapur Taluk, Yadgir district

== See also ==
- Ramnagar (disambiguation)
