= Halasangi =

- village
- Nicknames: Navilur, Karnatakada Poundichary
- Location in Karnataka, India Halasangi (India)
- Coordinates: 17.17°N 75.96°E
- Country: India
- State: Karnataka
- District: Bijapur
- Talukas: Chadachan

Population (2001)
  - Total: 5,211

Languages
  - Official: Kannada
- Time zone: UTC+5:30 (IST)

Halasangi is a village in the southern state of Karnataka, India. It is located in the Indi taluk of Bijapur district in Karnataka.

== Demographics ==
As of the 2001 India census, Halasangi has a population of 5211 with 2765 males and 2446 females.

Halsangi is well known in Kannada literary history as it was once the centre of literary activity and produced much famed poets in first half of 20th century, in name of "Halasangiya Geleyaru"(Group of Poets). This group included Madhura Chenna, Gurulinga Kapse, Dhoolasaheb, Simpi Linganna (Chadchan) and many more. It was a place of regular visit by Jnanapeetha Awardee, Varakavi Dattatreya Ramachandra Bendre and renowned Kannada poet Chenna Veera Kanavi.

This village also a place of "His Divine grace Sri Arabindo Ghosh Ashram" a freedom fighter turned Saint, whose remains brought from Pondicherry and worshipped here.

Bijapur Deccan's sultanate Adil Shahi built a tomb here which resembles Golgubaz, a master piece in Bijapur. It also has a historical fortress called 'Jakkavva fort' named after a dalit pregnant women named Jakkavva believed to be sacrificed alive to make this fort erect.

== See also ==
- Bijapur district
- Districts of Karnataka
