= Deshpande Tanda =

Deshpande Tanda is a locality on Sindagi Road in the town of Indi of the district of Vijayapura, Karnataka state, India. Deshpande Tanda is divided into two parts, Deshpande LT No. 1 and Deshpande LT No. 2, which are at a distance of 2 kilometers and 4 kilometers respectively from Indi town.

These tandas are home to the Goar Banjaras or Lambanis, which are a group of schedule castes. The people here are largely below the poverty line and relatively less literate.

These tandas belong to ward no. 21 in Indi taluk and are represented by a member of the municipal corporation of Indi, elected by the people. They are also headed traditionally by two men, called a Naik and a Karbhari.

Each tanda has a temple, consisting of Shree Sevaalaal Muhaaraaja and Shree Durgaa Devi. Every year, a big pooja is conducted in these temples, for two days, with old religious ceremonies, accompanied by cultural programs and lots of singing and dancing.
