= Anjutagi =

- village
- Location in Karnataka, India Anjutagi (India)
- Coordinates: 17.17°N 75.96°E
- Country: India
- State: Karnataka
- District: Bijapur
- Talukas: Indi

Population (2001)
  - Total: 6,659

Languages
  - Official: Kannada
- Time zone: UTC+5:30 (IST)
- ISO 3166 code: IN-KA
- Vehicle registration: KA
- Website: karnataka.gov.in

Anjutagi is a village in the southern state of Karnataka, India. It is located in the Indi taluk of Bijapur district in Karnataka.

== Demographics ==
As of 2001 India census, Anjutagi had a population of 6659 with 3481 males and 3178 females.

== See also ==
- Bijapur
- Districts of Karnataka
