= Naad =

Naad may refer to:

- Naad (film), 2024 Indian Marathi-language film romantic action film
- 3-fumarylpyruvate hydrolase, enzyme
- Naad (K.D.), village in southern state of Karnataka, India
