= Lachyan (disambiguation) =

Lachyan is a village in Karnataka State, India.

Lachyan may also refer to Lachin, a town in Azerbaijan.
