= Tadavalga =

- village
- Location in Karnataka, India Tadavalga (India)
- Coordinates: 17.17°N 75.96°E
- Country: India
- State: Karnataka
- District: Bijapur
- Talukas: Indi

Population (2001)
  - Total: 8,971

Languages
  - Official: Kannada
- Time zone: UTC+5:30 (IST)

Tadavalga is a village in the southern state of Karnataka, India. It is located in the Indi taluk of Bijapur district in Karnataka.

== Demographics ==
As of 2001 India census, Tadavalga had a population of 8971 with 4604 males and 4367 females.

== See also ==
- Bijapur district
- Districts of Karnataka
