= Baragudi =

Village in Karnataka, India

- Village
- Location in Karnataka, India Baragudi (India)
- Coordinates: 17°19′0″N 75°56′0″E
- Country: India
- State: Karnataka
- District: Bijapur
- Taluk: Indi

Government
  - Type: Gram panchayat
- Elevation: 426 m (1,398 ft)

Population (2011)
  - Total: 2,401

Languages
  - Official: Kannada
- Time zone: UTC+5:30 (IST)
- PIN: 586112
- STD code: 08359

Baragudi is a village located in Indi Taluk, Bijapur district, Karnataka State, India. This village is situated on the bank of the Bhima River. Nearby villages are Lachyan, Loni, Ahirasang and Padanur. In the year 2011, Baragudi had a population of 2,401.

== Geography ==
Baragudi is located on Karnataka's northern state boundary with Maharashtra, at an average elevation of 426 meters above the sea level. It covers an area of 1031.6 hectares.

== Demographics ==
As of 2011, Baragudi had a population of 2,401, residing in 391 households. The literacy rate was 48.23%, with 728 of the male residents and 430 of the female residents being literate.
