= Ballolli =

- village
- Location in Karnataka, India Ballolli (India)
- Coordinates: 17.23°N 75.79°E
- Country: India
- State: Karnataka
- District: Bijapur
- Talukas: Bijapur

Population (2001)
  - Total: 6,264

Languages
  - Official: Kannada
- Time zone: UTC+5:30 (IST)

Ballolli is a village in the southern state of Karnataka, India. It is located in the Indi taluk of Bijapur district in Karnataka.

== See also ==
- Bijapur district, Karnataka
- Districts of Karnataka
