= Salotgi =

- village
- Location in Karnataka, India Salotgi (India)
- Coordinates: 17°7′55.271″N 76°1′12.188″E
- Country: India
- State: Karnataka
- District: Bijapur
- Talukas: Indi

Population (2001)
  - Total: 10,664

Languages
  - Official: Kannada
- Time zone: UTC+5:30 (IST)

Salotgi is a village in the southern state of Karnataka, India. It is located in the Indi taluk of Bijapur district in Karnataka. It is about 7–8 km from Indi.

== Demographics ==
As of 2001 India census, Salotgi had a population of 10,664 with 5,481 males and 5,183 females.

== Salotgi as a centre of learning in the 11th century ==
According to A.S. Altekar in Education in Ancient India:

The village of Salotgi in Bijapur District of the Bombay Presidency was a famous centre, probably of Vedic learning, in the 10th and 11th centuries C.E. The Sanskrit college that flourished at this place must have existed for a long time, for it eventually transformed the original name of the place, Pavittage, into Salotgi, which is an abbreviated and Prakristised compound of Sala and Pavittage. The college was located in a spacious hall, attached to the temple of Tray-Purusha, which was built by Narayana, a minister of the Rashtrakuta emperor Krishna III. Owing to its far spread fame for efficiency, the college could attract students from different parts of the country. The strength of the college is not known, but it seems that 27 houses were necessary for lodging the students. An endowment of 12 Nivartanas(probably equal to 60 acres) of land was made for meeting the lighting charges of the boarding houses. The students were offered free boarding, an endowment of 500 Nivartanas having been received for that purpose. It would appear that at least 200 students were offered free boarding, lodging and education at this institution.

== Transportation ==
Salotgi can be reached by K.S.R.T.C buses from Indi which is 7–8 km away. the nearest railway station is Indi Road Railway which is connected to Solapur and Bijapur. Some private buses can be accessed to reach Salotgi. The nearest airport is Solapur. One can also reach Salotgi by hiring a tum tum(a slightly larger auto-rickshaw that can carry up to 10 people, locally known as "tum-tum" due to the engine sound heard from this vehicle) from Indi.

== Places of interest ==
- The temple of Shri Shivyogishwara, the gramadevata (village deity) of Salotagi
- The sacred place of Shri Shivayogishwara padagatti where it is believed that Shri Shivayogishwara once stood and observed Salotagi before entering it.
- 20 kilometers west of Salotagi is Mannur, where we have a Temple dedicated to Shri Gaddilingeshwara, a blessed disciple of Shri Shivayogishwara. This town also has a temple of Yallama devi.

== See also ==
- Bijapur district
- Districts of Karnataka
