= Ramlila =

Folk re-enactment of the life of Hindu deity Rama

Ramlila Ramleela
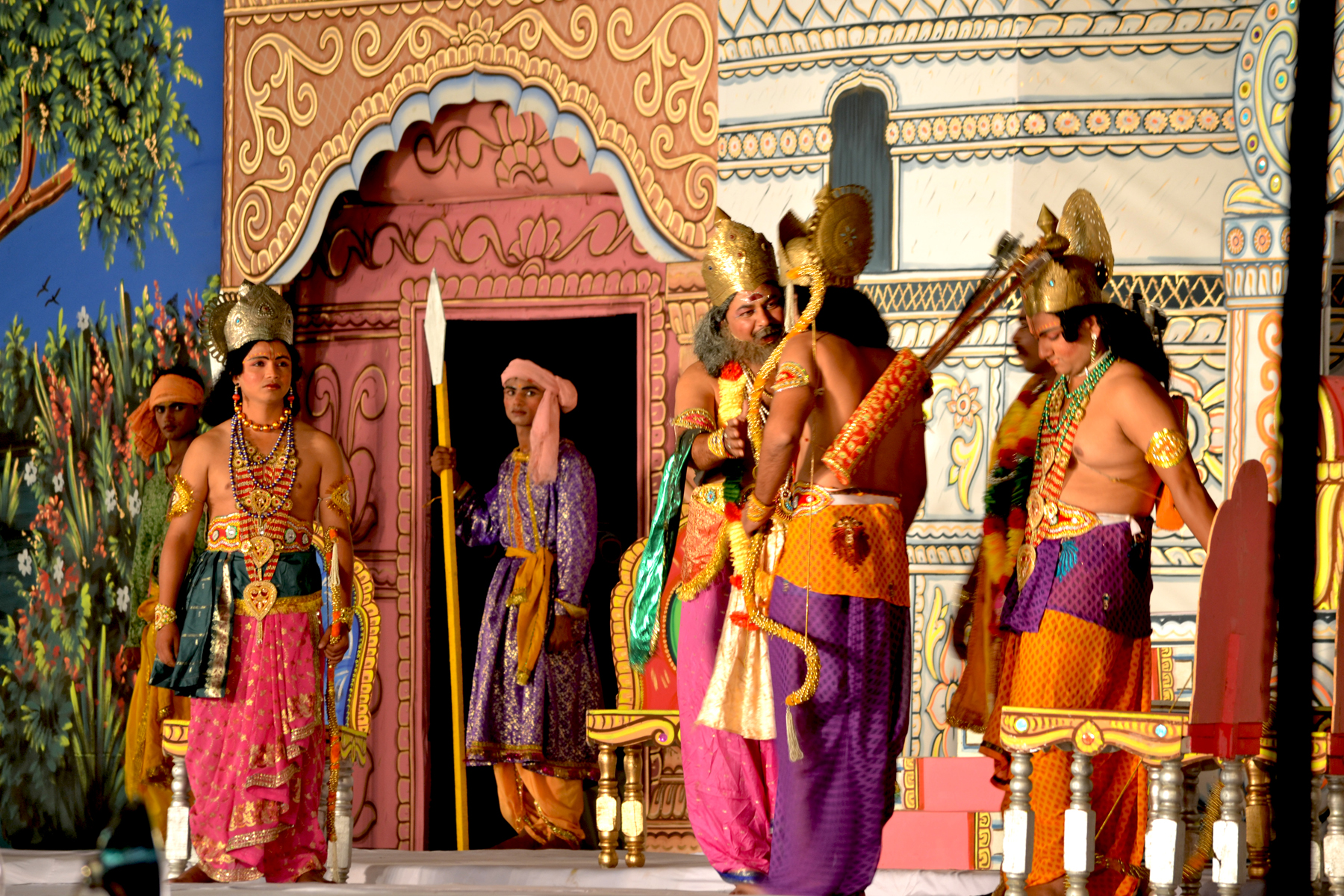
- A scene from annual Ramlila at Ramlila Maidan, New Delhi, India in 2012
- Status: active
- Genre: Religious
- Date: During the month of Ashvin
- Frequency: Annually
- Years active: 1625–present
- Inaugurated: 1625 (401 years ago)
- Founder: Tulsidas and Megha Bhagat

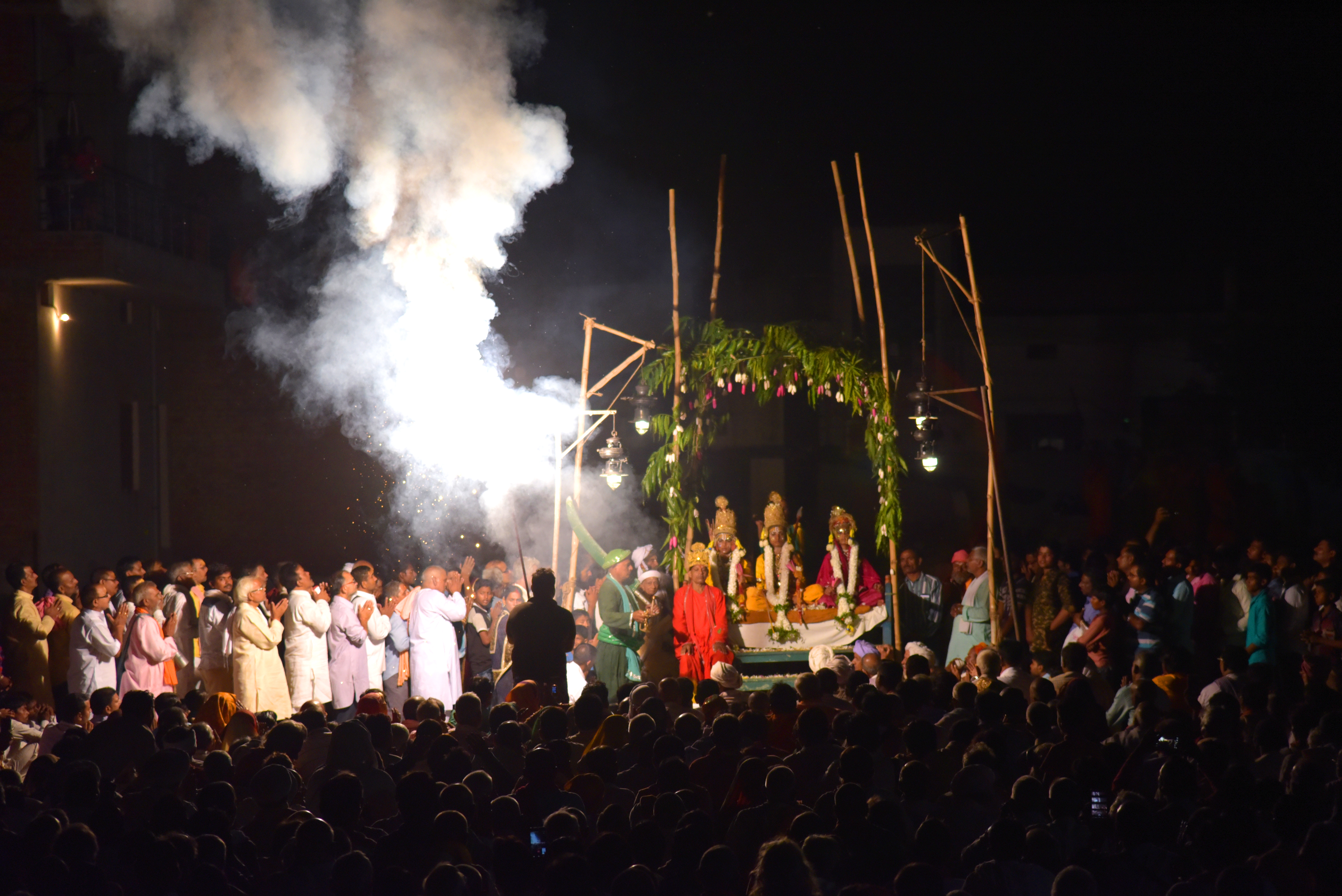
This image is taken during 2018 World Famous Ramnagar Ramlila

Ramlila or Ramleela (Sanskrit: रामलीला, romanized: Rāmalīlā; literally 'Rama's lila or play') is any dramatic folk re-enactment of the life of Rama according to the ancient Hindu epic Ramayana or secondary literature based on it such as the Ramcharitmanas. It particularly refers to the thousands of the Hindu god Rama-related dramatic plays and dance events, that are staged during the annual autumn festival of Navaratri in India. After the enactment of the legendary war between good and evil, the Ramlila celebrations climax in the Vijayadashami (Dussehra) night festivities where the giant grotesque effigies of evil such as of the rakshasa (demon) Ravana are burnt, typically with fireworks. Rama is the seventh avatar of the Hindu deity Vishnu and the central figure of the Ramayana, a Sanskrit epic that integrates performance arts with stories driven by ethical values. The epic text is dated to the 1st millennium BCE and Ramlila is an adaptation of those stories. Most Ramlilas in North India are based on the 16th-century secondary work on Ramayana, Ramcharitmanas a verse form composition in the Awadhi language of Uttar Pradesh by Tulsidas. These verses are used as dialogues in traditional adaptations. Open-air productions are staged by local Ramlila committees (Samitis), and funded entirely by the villagers or local neighbourhoods in urban areas. The core team of performance artists train for the dance-drama, but the actual performance attracts impromptu participants from the audience and villagers. This art form is a part of the Hindu culture, found for many gods and goddesses, but those of Rama, Durga (as Durga Puja) and Krishna (as Rasalila) are the most popular and annual events in the Indian subcontinent.

The Ramlila festivities were declared by UNESCO as one of the "Intangible Cultural Heritage of Humanity" in 2008. Ramlila is particularly notable in historically important Hindu cities of Ayodhya, Varanasi, Vrindavan, Almora, Una, Chamba, Solan, Satna and Madhubani – cities in Uttar Pradesh, Uttarakhand, Himachal Pradesh, Bihar and Madhya Pradesh. The epic and its dramatic play migrated into Southeast Asia in the 1st millennium CE, and Ramayana based Ramlila is a part of performance art culture of Indonesia particularly the Hindu society of Bali, Myanmar, Cambodia and Thailand. In the 19th and 20th centuries, with the movement of the Indian diaspora into European colonies as indentured laborers, the cultural celebration of Ramlila is now found in many parts of the world such as Fiji, Guyana, Mauritius, South Africa, Suriname, and Trinidad and Tobago. It is also found in the United States, Canada, the United Kingdom, the Netherlands, Australia, and New Zealand.

== Etymology and nomenclature ==
Ramlila is a compound Sanskrit words "Rama" (Vishnu's avatar) and "Lila" (play, game, sport). According to James Lochtefeld, the word connotes a "playful drama about Rama", where it is both entertainment and a "deeply serious religious act" that has spiritual significance to both the actors and the audience.

A literal translation of Ram Lila, states Norvin Hein, is "Rama's sport" where the term "sport" is best understood in a theological context. According to the Vaishnava thought, the Supreme Being (Vishnu) does not need to create the empirical world, he just descends as an avatar and manifests in the empirical world to "spontaneously, joyfully, disinterestedly play a part" or engage in "sports".

The teams or companies of actors that train together and perform Ramlila are called Mandalis.

== History ==
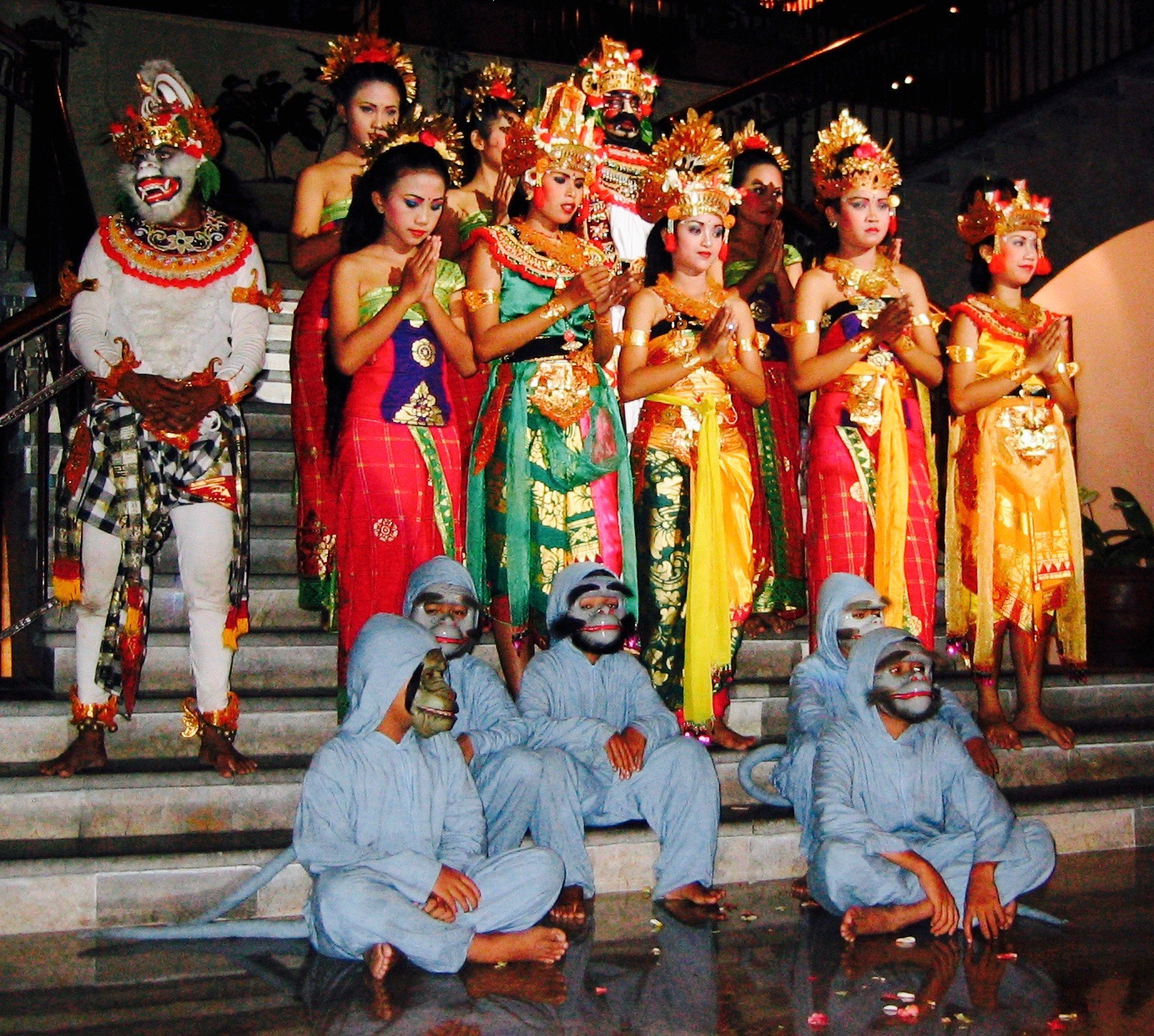
A Ramayana-based Ramlila dance troupe in Bali, Indonesia.

Performance arts are an ancient Indian tradition, with the Sanskrit Hindu text Natya Shastra explaining the importance of performing arts as follows:

Let Nātya (drama and dance) be the fifth vedic scripture.
Combined with an epic story,
tending to virtue, wealth, joy and spiritual freedom,
it must contain the significance of every scripture,
and forward every art.

— Nātyaśāstra 1.14–15

Ramlila is one of many performance arts-related festivities within Hinduism. Ramayana epic is dated to the 1st millennium BCE, and is one of the oldest Itihasa genres of Indian literature. It is unclear however as to when the first performances of Ramlila were held. The first enactment of Ramcharitmanas by 16th century Tulsidas is undocumented, but according to the tradition, his student Megha Bhagat started the Ramcharitmanas-based Ramlila in 1625. According to Norvin Hein, a professor of Divinity and of Religious Studies specialising in Indology, Ramlila was in vogue before 1625, at least in North India between 1200 and 1500 CE, but these were based on Valmiki's Ramayana. According to Richard Schechner, the contemporary Ramlila has deeper roots, as it incorporates both the teachings of ancient Sanskrit texts and modern theatre techniques.

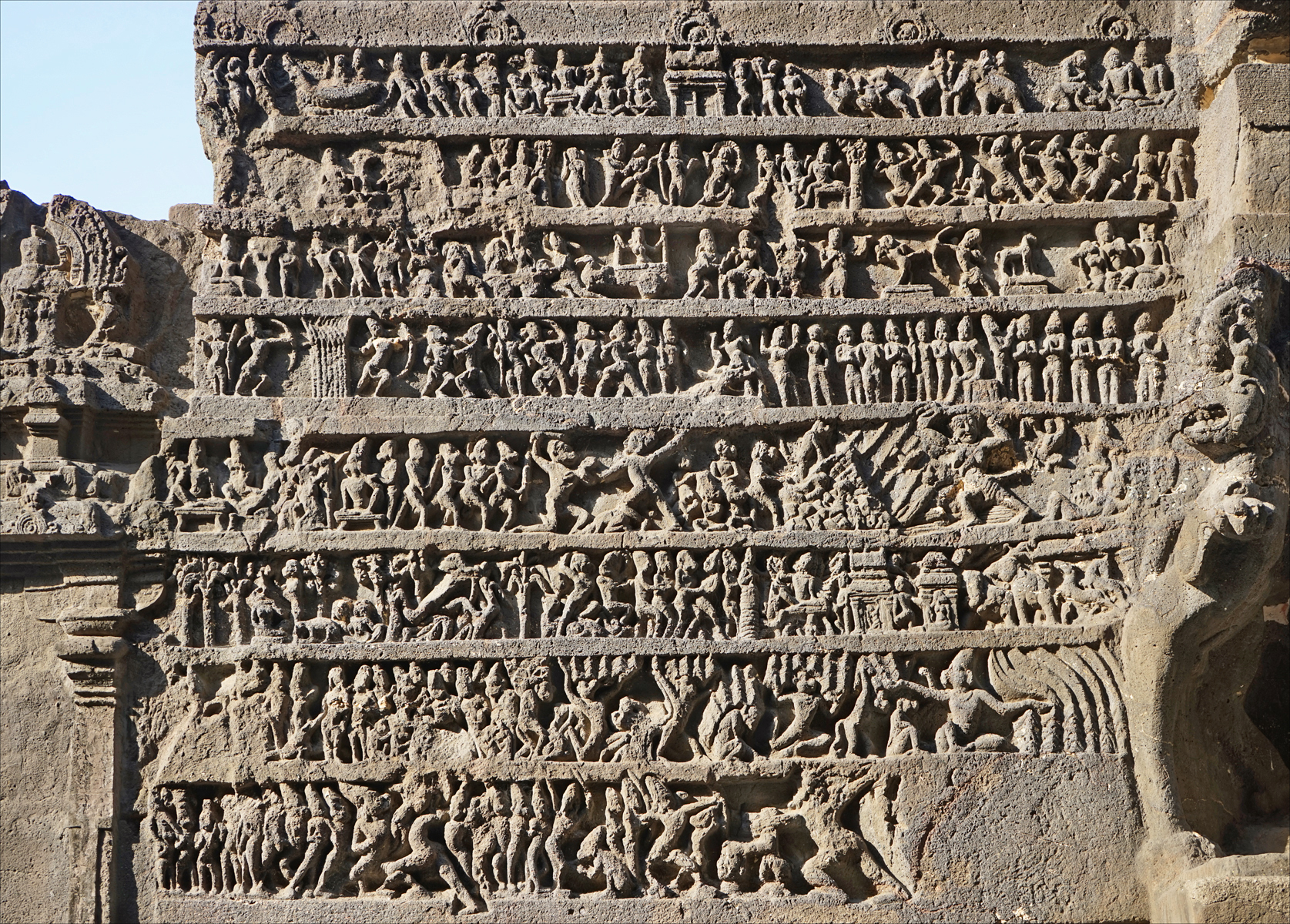
The Ramayana relief artwork in 8th century Cave 16 of Ellora suggests its importance to Indian society by then.

According to John Brockington, a professor of Sanskrit specialising in Indian epics, Ramlila is likely an ancient tradition of India because it is generally accepted by scholars that written manuscripts emerged later in Indian religions, and ancient texts were largely a product of oral tradition. Thus, not only Ramalila, but all ancient epics of India must very likely have been recited and transmitted by bards and students in Ramlila-like manner, verbally from one generation to another, and consistently preserved across a wide geographic region by rules of acting by many teams. Further, states Brockington, the Hindu epics are too vast, with the Ramayana containing 20,000 verses and the Mahabharata with 100,000 verses, to have been preserved over two thousand years without being written down and without reciting and acting out. It is therefore unlikely that the Ramlila tradition emerged only in the modern era.

Some colonial-era Indologists suggested, adds Brockington, that the Ramayana is a modern era text, but this hypothesis has since been abandoned because the existence of the Hindu Ramayana has been attested in Jainism literature, Ramayana reliefs in cave temples such as Ellora Caves, and southeast Asian temple carvings and culture by the 1st millennium CE.

According to Norvin Hein, the contemporary Ramlila started once the Manas text of Tulsidas had been composed in the 16th century. However, states Hein, a dance-drama form of Ramayana enactment flourished at least in the Mathura region much earlier, possibly around the early centuries of the common era by the Vaishnavism tradition of Hinduism. He traces the evidence for this in the Kathakali, Yaksagana, Kathak and other Indian classical dances which share segments, themes and styles with Ramlila.

James Prinsep wrote an eyewitness description of Varanasi Ramlila festivities in 1825, while H. Niehus wrote another from Ghazipur in 1905. Norvin Hein described the Ramlila of 1949 and 1950, a period of socio-political turmoil in India after the British India partition of the subcontinent into India and Pakistan. Hein reported his observations from Ramilila in Mathura.

== Description ==
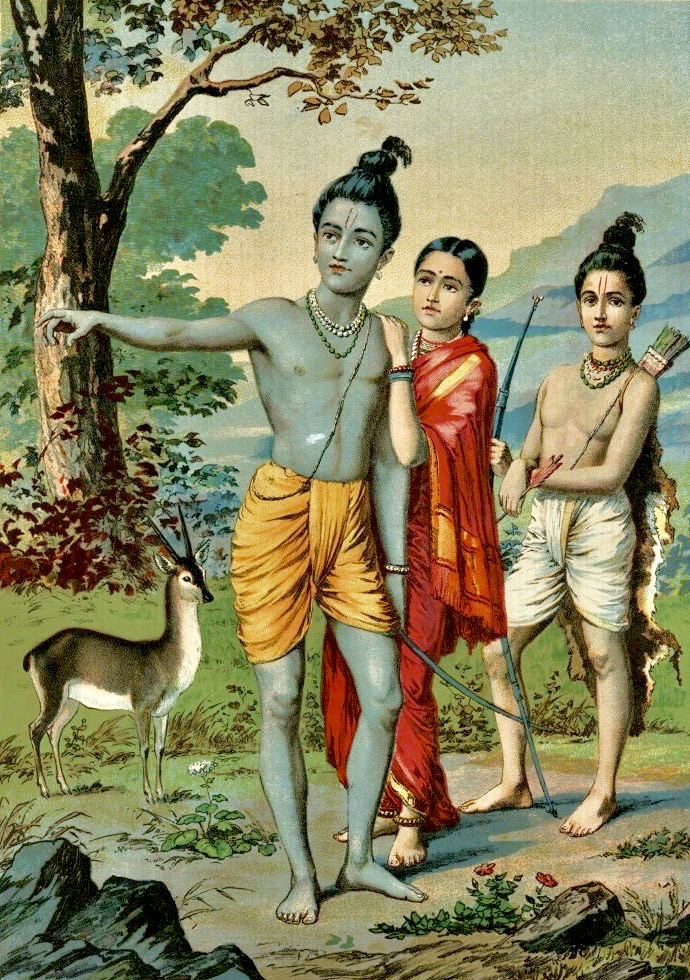
Ramlila revolves around the epic of Rama, depicted here with his wife Sita and brother Lakshmana.

The Ramlila is the story of the Hindu god Rama. The epic recites his childhood along with those of others who are major characters in it, such as Sita, Lakshmana, Ravana and others. It includes chapters on the marriage of Sita and Rama, the exile of Rama because Dharma requires him to give up his throne, Sita and Lakshmana joining him in the exile, their journeys through India and they meeting revered Rishis of Hinduism, the abduction of Sita by demon Ravana, the sorrow of Rama and Lakshmana, their hopelessness, how they creatively build an army from other living beings in the forest such as monkeys, their journey to Lanka to confront Ravana, the battle between the good and evil, the destruction of Ravana, the return of Rama to Ayodhya and as king, and the life thereafter.

Ramlila festivals play this story. It is organised in numerous villages, towns and neighbourhoods during the autumn Navaratri festival season which typically falls in September or October. The festival is both a religious and cultural event, bringing the population together, states UNESCO, "without distinction of caste, religion or age". The audience such as the villagers participate spontaneously, playing roles or helping out in setting and cleaning up the stage, making costumes, and upkeep of the Ramlila area.

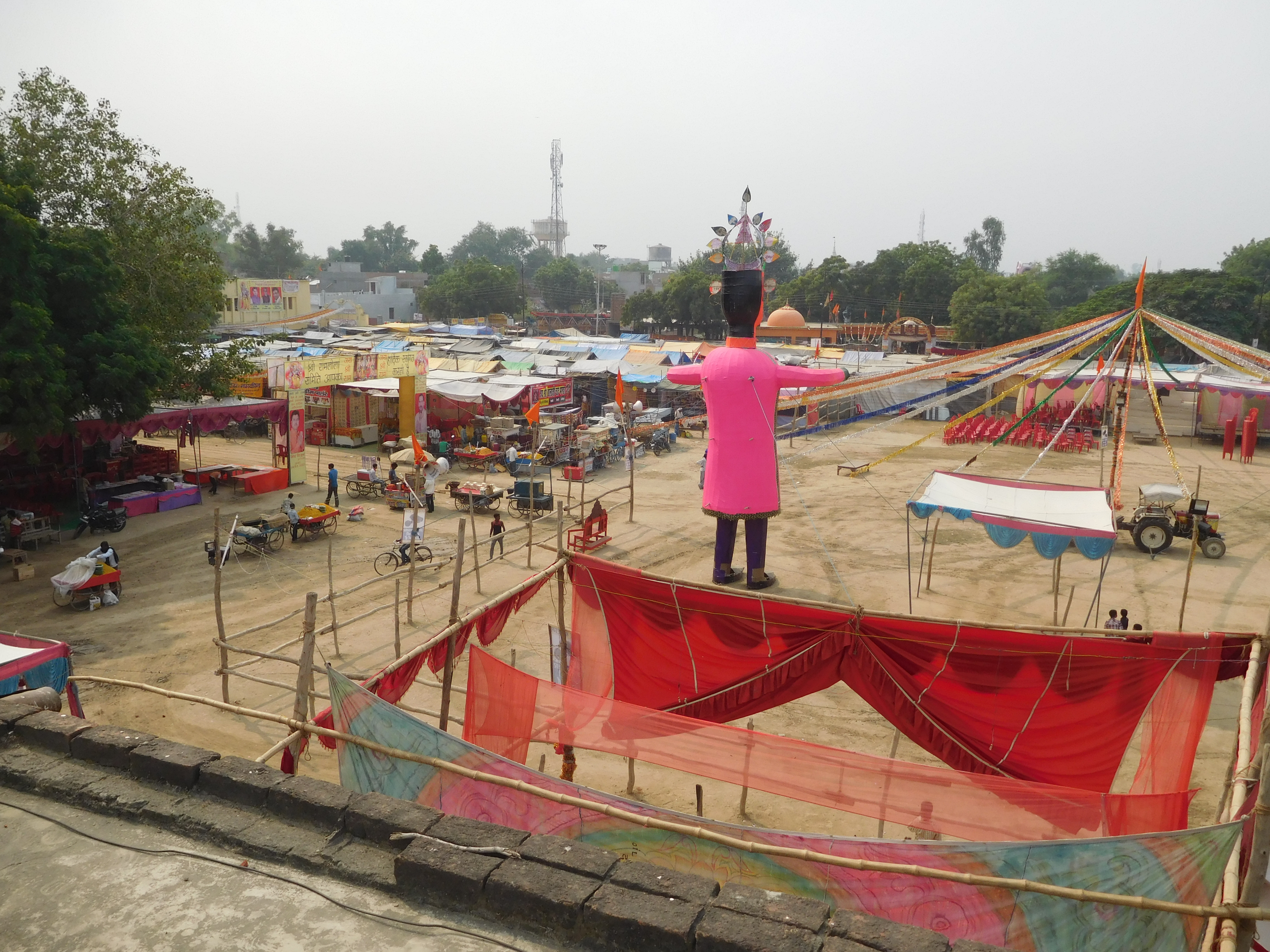
A rural Ramlila stage setup in progress in India. The large effigy is of Ravana who is destroyed at the end.

Traditionally organised in a makeshift open-air theatre at night, it is usually staged by amateur acting teams drawn from all segments of the society. Singers and musicians, men and women, elderly and youth play different parts, sing the verses to music, recite dialogues. The recitations and the narrative of the play are usually based on Ramacharitamanas. The dialogue is improvised, and often responsive to audience reactions. Dhol drummers and other musicians participate. The atmosphere is usually festive and free, with the audience whistling and commenting as the story proceeds. The stage is surrounded by food stalls and larger productions have a fair nearby. Surrounding areas temporarily transform into bazaars to cater to the audience. A committee (samiti) heads the preparation. In many rural areas, traditional venues for Ramlila have developed over the centuries, and hundreds of people will often make the trip nightly to attend the play, by walking over miles like a religious pilgrimage in earlier times. Actors typically don't get paid, or get paid little for their efforts, but they are provided free food and accommodation by the villagers or committee. Performance costs are usually financed by fundraising in the community, often by self-organized Ramlila Committees. The early-twentieth-century poem Radheshyam Ramayan by Pandit Radheshym Kathavachak is commonly used in Ramlila theatre because of its commentary on the political climate at the time in addition to the use of simple language and symbolism. The dialogue within the poem suit the "themes and dramatic styling" of Ramlila's performance for both battle scenes and more "rousing" scenes.

A Ramlila is not a simple play acted out in a drama theatre, but it is structured to encourage and allow the audience to participate. In major productions, the audience walks with the actors from one site to another, they chant or co-recite passage, they immerse themselves as minor or significant characters in the play, while the major roles are played by a troupe of artists. The audience cheers when the good gets the upper hand, they are sorrowful when a wrong happens such as the kidnapping of Sita and her imprisonment against her will by demon Ravana. They participate in the burning of the effigies, and the community is welcome during the return of Rama back to Ayodhya. It is theologically an immersion experience.

== Regional variations ==
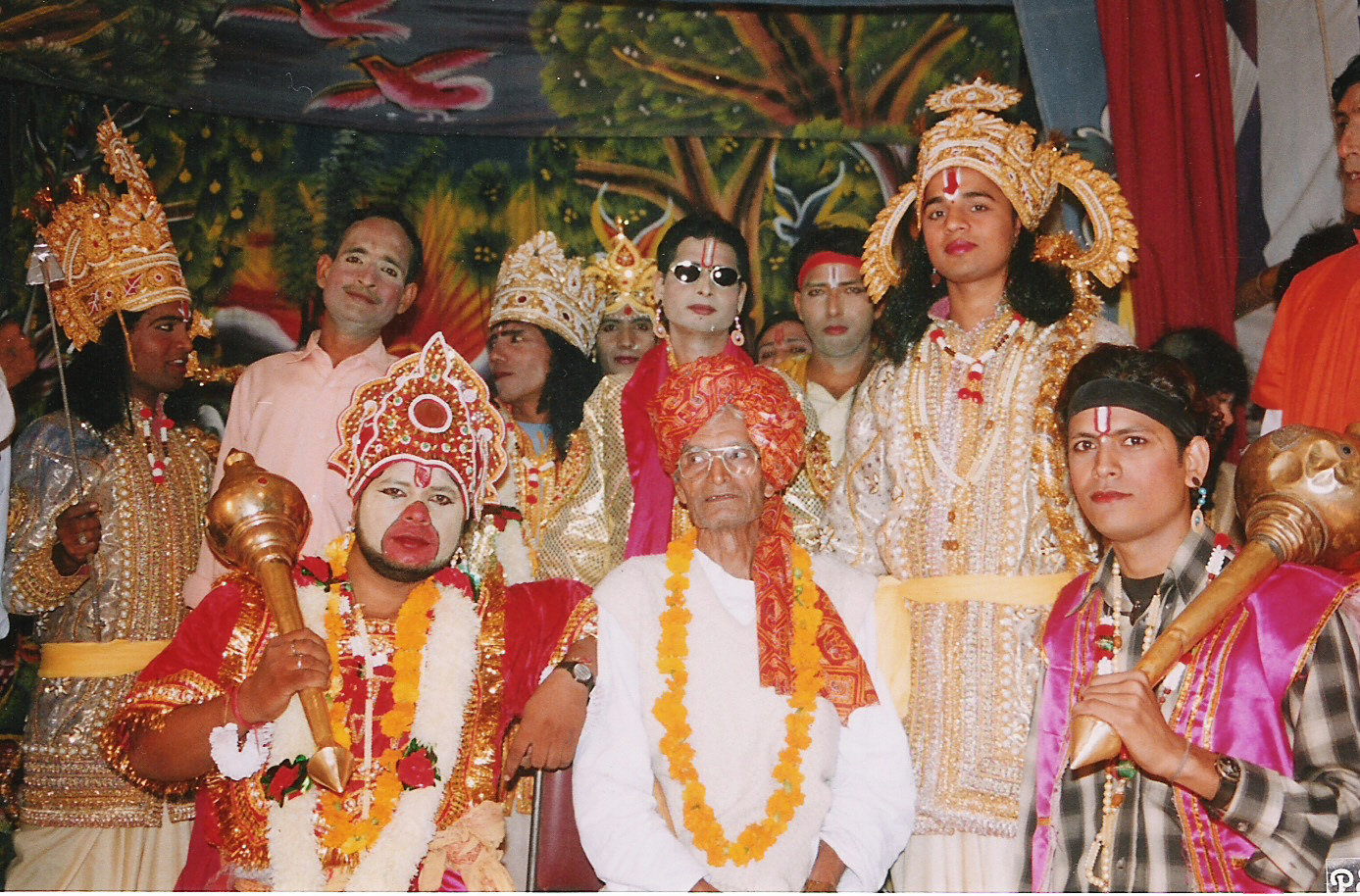
Lead performers of a Ramlila troupe mandali, with the director, called vyasa

Today, several regions have developed their distinctive form of Ramlila, Uttar Pradesh itself has numerous variants of presentation styles, most prominent among them is that of Ramnagar, Varanasi which is a 31-day event, while most Ramlila elsewhere are typically abridged 10-day events climaxing in Dussehra.

Other variants include the pantomime style is visible in jhankis or tableaux pageants, where colourful Jhankis and pageants depicting scenes from the life of Rama are taken out through the city. According to a 2008 UNESCO report, the most notable Ramlila traditions are those observed annually at Ayodhya, Ramnagar and Varanasi, Vrindavan, Almora, Satna and Madhubani.

Another variant is the operatic style incorporates elements of folk theatre elements generously, while the traditional style remains, where the couplets of Ramacharitmanas not only act as dialogues, but also as a chorus as well, and lastly, there is the Ramlila staged by professional troupes called "mandalis". Many urban Ramilias now have dialogues written in Khadi Boli or in local dialects, but the treatment remains melodramatic as always to achieve maximum impact amidst an audience that knows the story by heart, but watches the enactment nevertheless for religious fervour and also for its spectacle value, making Ramlila an important event in the religious as well as the social calendar of not only in small town and villages but also many big cities. Just other folk theatre form of India, like Jatra of Bengal, topic themes are often interwoven in the script to have relevance and sometimes humour is used to offer a critic or commentary over current happenings.

=== Ramlila at Ramnagar, Varanasi ===
The tradition of staging the Ramlila at Ramnagar, Varanasi, which lies across the Ganges river from the Hindu pilgrimage city of Varanasi, was started in c.1830 by Maharaja Udit Narayan Singh, Kashi Naresh with the help of Pandit Laxmi Narayan Pandey's family (present vyas ji of the Ramlila of Ramnagar). It rose in popularity during the reign of his successor Maharaj Ishwari Prasad Narayan Singh, and received continued patronage from the subsequent Maharajas of the Royal House of Benares to create a participatory environmental theatre (Site-specific theatre) on a grand scale, where attendance ranges from few thousands to 100,000 for others.

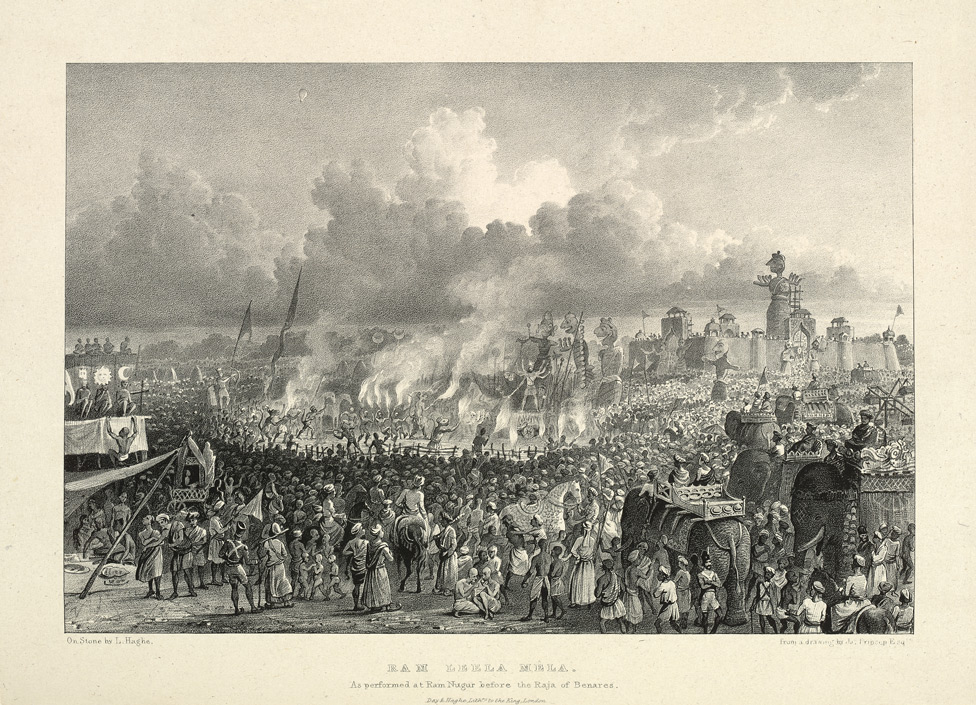
Ram Leela Mela, before the Raja of Benares, the culmination of Ramlila with burning of Ravana effigies, at Ramnagar Fort, 1834

According to Philip Lutgendorf, the older lila of Chota Mirzapur that the maharaja took over had lasted ten to twelve days, but under royal patronage it grew to fill an entire calendar month and was made a ritual recitation (pārāyaṇ) of the complete Ramcharitmanas, so that even the epic's long introduction and epilogue were recited, adding a further ten days to the performance. Tradition holds that Ishwari Prasad Narayan Singh later entrusted the poet Bharatendu Harishchandra with modernising the dialogues, recasting them from Bhojpuri into a modified Khari Boli, after which the Ramnagar production became fixed in its present form.

The Ramlila is a cycle of plays that recounts the epic story of Rama, as told in Ramcharitmanas, the version of the Ramayana penned by Tulsidas. The plays sponsored by the Maharaja, are performed in Ramnagar every evening for 31 days. The Ramnagar Ramlila is held over 31 days where the entire Ramacharitmanas is recited, instead of the usual 10 for abridged production. It is known for its lavish sets, dialogues and visual spectacle. In Ramnagar, a number of stages have been constructed by the town, each named after the major sites of events in the Ramayana epic. The permanent structures and several temporary structures serve as sets, to represent locations like Ashoka Vatika, Janakpuri, Panchavati, Lanka etc., during the performance. Hence the entire city turns into a giant open-air set, and the audience moves along with the performers with every episode, to the next locale. As the play progresses, the actors and audience move from one place to another, they join the chorus, giving the feeling that the audience is participating and is a part of the play.

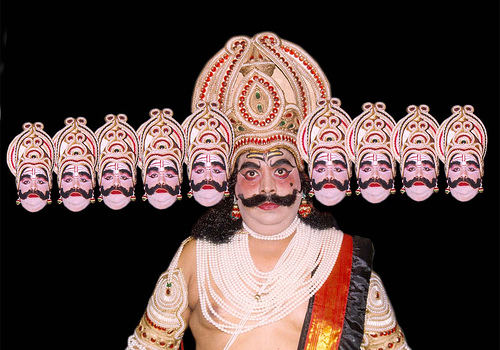
A Ramlila actor in the traditional attire of Ravana

Preparations begin, weeks before its commencement, even the audition process is traditionally attended to by the Maharaja, where Svarupas, literally divine embodiment, the various characters of the Ramayana, are chosen from amongst local actors. Important roles are often inherited by families, for example, the role of Ravana was held by the same family from 1835 to 1990, and roles of Hanuman, Jatayu, and Janaka are traditionally selected by Vyasa family. When the Dussehra festivities are inaugurated with a colourful pageant Kashi Naresh rides an elephant at the head of the procession. Then, resplendent in silk and brocade, he inaugurates the month-long folk theatre of Ramlila at Ramnagar. During the period, hundreds of sadhus called Ramayanis descend into the town to watch and recite the Ramcharitmanas text. Many an audience carry a copy of the Ramacharit Manas, simply called Manas, and follow stanza after stanza, after the characters deliver their dialogue. The legend and the festival is a part of their spiritual practice, they do not go to Ramlila, they immerse in it.

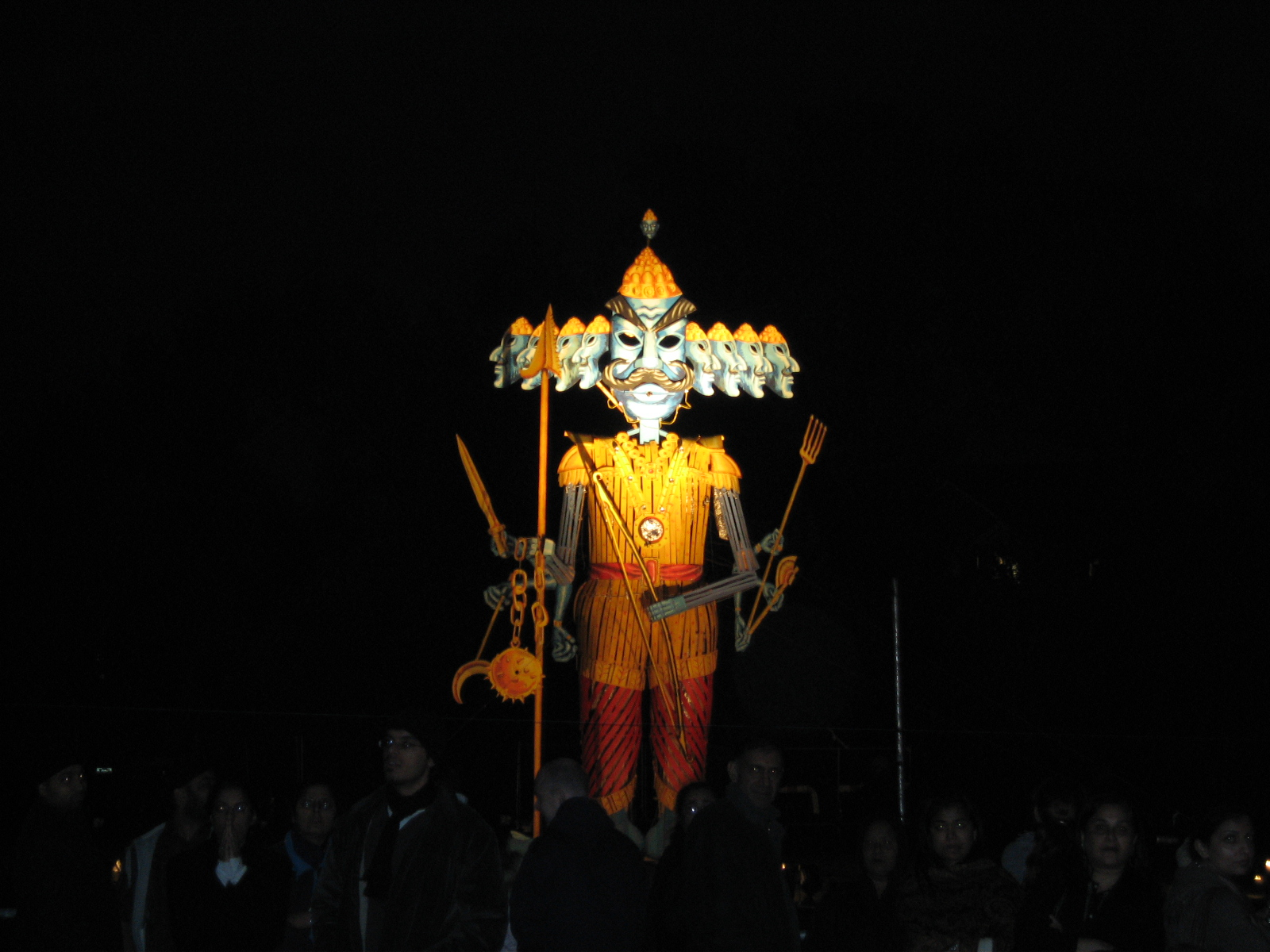
Ravana effigy during a Ramlila event.

During the performance, there is a double transformation of the space within the city, as it first transforms from a city to theatre and then to mythic geography, as the scale of the performance is gradually increased to mythic proportions, coming down only in the end, when Rama finally returns home, this is when the Raja himself becomes part of the theatre thereby incorporating local element into the story itself. In the end, as the swarups, actors depart, they take off their garlands and offer it to Royal family members and give darshan to the audience, after the performance one last time. At the end of each episode, lila, an aarti is performed, chants of 'Har Har Mahadev' or 'Bolo! Raja Ramchandra ki Jai!' resound in the air, as the audience join in. Thereafter, a jhanki, literally a peep or glimpse, tableaux of frozen iconic moments from the 'Manas', is presented, which not only distill and crystallise the message of the story for the audience but is also appreciated for its spectacular effect.

Though several local legends exist regarding the beginning of this Ramlila, including one of which suggests that it was first staged at a nearby village, Chota Mirzapur as the one at Varanasi was disrupted due to the floods in the Ganges, from where it evolved to the present Ramlila, which is by far the most traditional rendition of the Ramayana, and has been a subject of study by scholars from all over the world for many decades now.

On the last day, the festivities reach a crescendo as Rama vanquishes the demon king Ravana. Over a million pilgrims arrive annually for the vast processions and performances organised by Kashi Naresh.

==== Shri Sitaram Dharmmandal, Saraiharkhu Jaunpur ====
Saraiharkhu is a village situated in Jaunpur, Uttar Pradesh in India on the Jaunpur – Lucknow road, about 18 km (11 mi) from the city of Jaunpur. Ramleela here started in 1932 by the Shri Sitaram Dharm Mandal and from then its performed every year during Dussehra. It was started by Kayastha family members of the village as a fun activity and now has participants from various parts of the country and abroad.

Ramleela is enacted for five days and on the sixth day, a large fair is organised in the village. Every year not only members but also audiences with family come for six days, leaving their important work.

===== Ramlila at Harishtal, Nainital, Uttarakhand =====
Harishtal is a village located in the district of Nainital, Uttarakhand about 70 km from the city of Haldwani and 15 km from the famous Haidakhan Babaji temple. The village is known for its Holi and Ramlila celebration. Unlike the greater tradition of organizing Ramlila in the month of October-November, the Ramlila here is organised in the month of June as most of the people can only be available only during the summer vacations. Just like in other parts of Kumaon, the Ramlila here is also staged by local residents following 20 to 25 days of preparation.

The character of Ravan, in the Ramlila of Harishtal, Nainital District, is delivering his final act, before dying

== Geographic spread ==
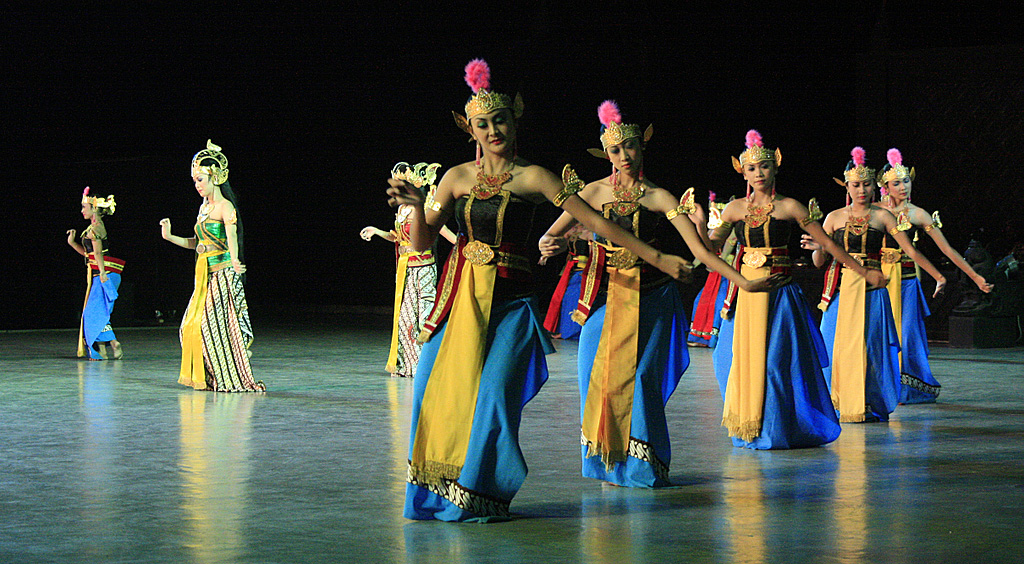
A modern Ramayana production.

Over the centuries, Ramlila has evolved into a highly venerated art form and has travelled to far corners of the globe, through Indian diaspora, not as acts of "cultural recovery", rather as fresh expressions of persistent faith. Today, Ramlila is staged in most countries with immigrant Hindu populations from the Indian subcontinent, including that from India, Nepal and Pakistan. Outside the Indian subcontinent, this includes Fiji, Mauritius, South Africa, Canada, Guyana, Suriname, Trinidad and Tobago, the Gulf countries, the United Kingdom, The Netherlands, the United States, Australia, and New Zealand. Some Asian cultures have similar drama traditions based on the Ramayana, for instance, the Phra Lak Phra Lam (Lak and Lam are the Laotian names for Lakshman and Ram, respectively) folkplay of Laos and northeastern Thailand.

The Rama story is also enacted in another popular art form as a nighttime fire shadow or day time puppet show. This is known as Tolapavakuthu in Kerala, Ravana chaya in Odisha, Nang sbek thom in Cambodia, Nang yai in Thailand and Wayang purwa in Indonesia.
