= Ramnagar Assembly constituency =

Ramnagar Assembly constituency may refer to these electoral constituencies in India:

- Ramnagar, Bihar Assembly constituency
- Ramnagar, Jammu and Kashmir Assembly constituency
- Ramanagara Assembly constituency, Karnataka
- Ramnagar, Tripura Assembly constituency
- Ram Nagar, Uttar Pradesh Assembly constituency
- Ramnagar, Uttarakhand Assembly constituency
- Ramnagar, West Bengal Assembly constituency

== See also ==
- Ramnagar (disambiguation)
