= Ramnagar Range, Udham Singh Nagar =

- village
- Location in Uttarakhand, India
- Coordinates: 29.23207174525486°N 79.2157189896957°E
- Country: India
- State: Uttarakhand
- District: Udham Singh Nagar district

Government
  - Body: None

Population
  - Total: 0

Languages
  - Official: Hindi
- Time zone: UTC+5:30 (IST)
- ISO 3166 code: IN-UK
- Vehicle registration: UK
- Website: uk.gov.in

Ramnagar Range, is an uninhabited census village in Bajpur, Udham Singh Nagar district in the state of Uttarakhand in India.

== Demographics ==
According to the 2011 Indian Census, the town has no people. The state of Uttarakhand has literacy rate of 87.6 percent which is higher than Nation's average of 74.04 percent.
