= Ramnagar, Jaspur =

- village
- Location in Uttarakhand, India
- Coordinates: 29.328271004551137°N 78.83563780880498°E
- Country: India
- State: Uttarakhand
- District: Udham Singh Nagar district

Government
  - Body: Grama Panchayat

Population
  - Total: 3,489

Languages
  - Official: Hindi
- Time zone: UTC+5:30 (IST)
- ISO 3166 code: IN-UK
- Vehicle registration: UK
- Website: uk.gov.in

Ramnagar Jaspur, is a village in Jaspur, Udham Singh Nagar district in the state of Uttarakhand in India.

== Demographics ==
According to the 2011 Indian Census, the town consists of 3,489 people. The state of Uttarakhand has literacy rate of 87.6 percent which is higher than Nation's average of 74.04 percent.

Total Number of Household : 662
Population	Persons	Males	Females
Total	3,489	1,793	1,696
In the age group 0–6 years	489	257	232
Scheduled Castes (SC)	1,338	693	645
Scheduled Tribes (ST)	0	0	0
Literates	2,101	1,238	863
Illiterate	1,388	555	833
Total Worker	982	905	77
Main Worker	931	887	44
Main Worker - Cultivator	415	408	7
Main Worker - Agricultural Labourers	327	311	16
Main Worker - Household Industries	8	7	1
Main Worker - Other	181	161	20
Marginal Worker	51	18	33
Marginal Worker - Cultivator	10	8	2
Marginal Worker - Agriculture Labourers	25	3	22
Marginal Worker - Household Industries	0	0	0
Marginal Workers - Other	16	7	9
Marginal Worker (3-6 Months)	36	8	28
Marginal Worker - Cultivator (3-6 Months)	6	4	2
Marginal Worker - Agriculture Labourers (3-6 Months)	21	2	19
Marginal Worker - Household Industries (3-6 Months)	0	0	0
Marginal Worker - Other (3-6 Months)	9	2	7
Marginal Worker (0-3 Months)	15	10	5
Marginal Worker - Cultivator (0-3 Months)	4	4	0
Marginal Worker - Agriculture Labourers (0-3 Months)	4	1	3
Marginal Worker - Household Industries (0-3 Months)	0	0	0
Marginal Worker - Other Workers (0-3 Months)	7	5	2
Non Worker	2,507	888	1,619
