= Ramnagar, Haridwar =

- village
- Location in Uttarakhand, India
- Coordinates: 29.87333947505301°N 77.87658562144594°E
- Country: India
- State: Uttarakhand
- District: Hardwar district

Government
  - Body: Grama Panchayat

Population
  - Total: 419

Languages
  - Official: Hindi
- Time zone: UTC+5:30 (IST)
- ISO 3166 code: IN-UK
- Vehicle registration: UK
- Website: uk.gov.in

Ramnagar, is a village in Roorkee, Hardwar district in the state of Uttarakhand in India.

== Demographics ==
According to the 2011 Indian Census, the town consists of 419 people. The state of Uttarakhand has literacy rate of 87.6 percent which is higher than Nation's average of 74.04 percent.

Total Number of Household : 58
Population	Persons	Males	Females
Total	419	217	202
In the age group 0–6 years	44	23	21
Scheduled Castes (SC)	0	0	0
Scheduled Tribes (ST)	0	0	0
Literates	326	180	146
Illiterate	93	37	56
Total Worker	104	103	1
Main Worker	82	81	1
Main Worker - Cultivator	56	56	0
Main Worker - Agricultural Labourers	1	1	0
Main Worker - Household Industries	5	5	0
Main Worker - Other	20	19	1
Marginal Worker	22	22	0
Marginal Worker - Cultivator	2	2	0
Marginal Worker - Agriculture Labourers	15	15	0
Marginal Worker - Household Industries	5	5	0
Marginal Workers - Other	0	0	0
Marginal Worker (3-6 Months)	21	21	0
Marginal Worker - Cultivator (3-6 Months)	1	1	0
Marginal Worker - Agriculture Labourers (3-6 Months)	15	15	0
Marginal Worker - Household Industries (3-6 Months)	5	5	0
Marginal Worker - Other (3-6 Months)	0	0	0
Marginal Worker (0-3 Months)	1	1	0
Marginal Worker - Cultivator (0-3 Months)	1	1	0
Marginal Worker - Agriculture Labourers (0-3 Months)	0	0	0
Marginal Worker - Household Industries (0-3 Months)	0	0	0
Marginal Worker - Other Workers (0-3 Months)	0	0	0
Non Worker	315	114	201
