= Ramnagar Fort =

Fortification near the Ganga River in Varanasi, India

- Part of Ramnagar, Varanasi
- Uttar Pradesh, India
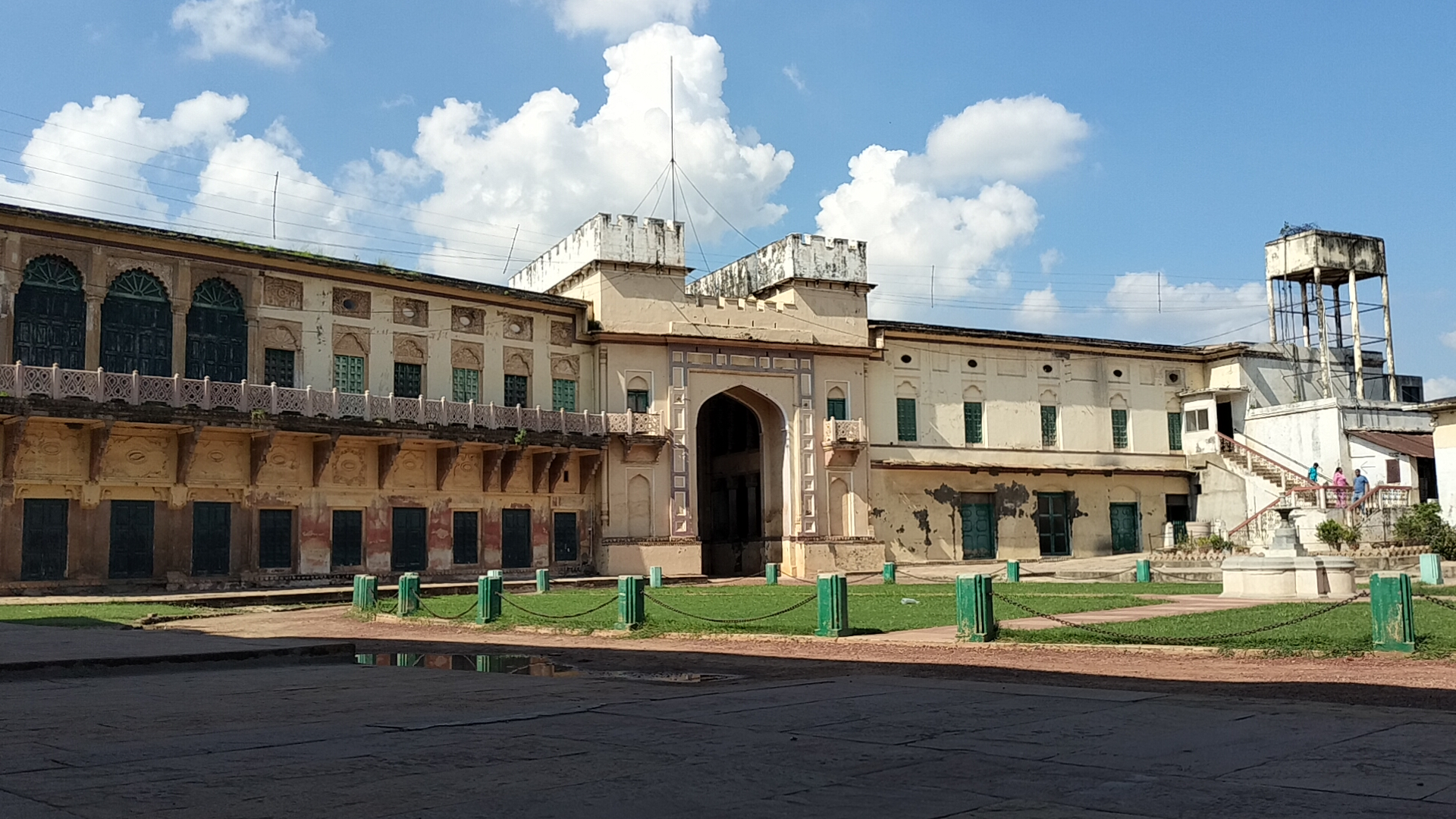
- Entrance of the Ramnagar Fort

Site information
- Type: Fort

Location
- Location within Uttar Pradesh
- Coordinates: 25.28°N 83.03°E

Site history
- Built: 1750
- Built by: Balwant Singh
- Materials: chunar sandstone

Garrison information
- Occupants: Anant Narayan Singh

The Ramnagar Fort is a fortification in Ramnagar, Varanasi, India. It is located near the Ganges on its eastern bank, opposite to the Tulsi Ghat. The sandstone structure was built in 1750 by the ruler of Banaras State Kashi Naresh Maharaja Balwant Singh. The construction work was commenced under supervision of Babu Azayab Singh, In-Laws of Kashi Naresh Maharaja Balwant Singh. Babu Azayab Singh was son of Babu Bariyar Singh, the zamindar of Pindara Banaras. The current king and the resident of the fort is Anant Narayan Singh, who is also known as the Maharaja of Benares even though this royal title has been abolished since 1971.

== Geography ==
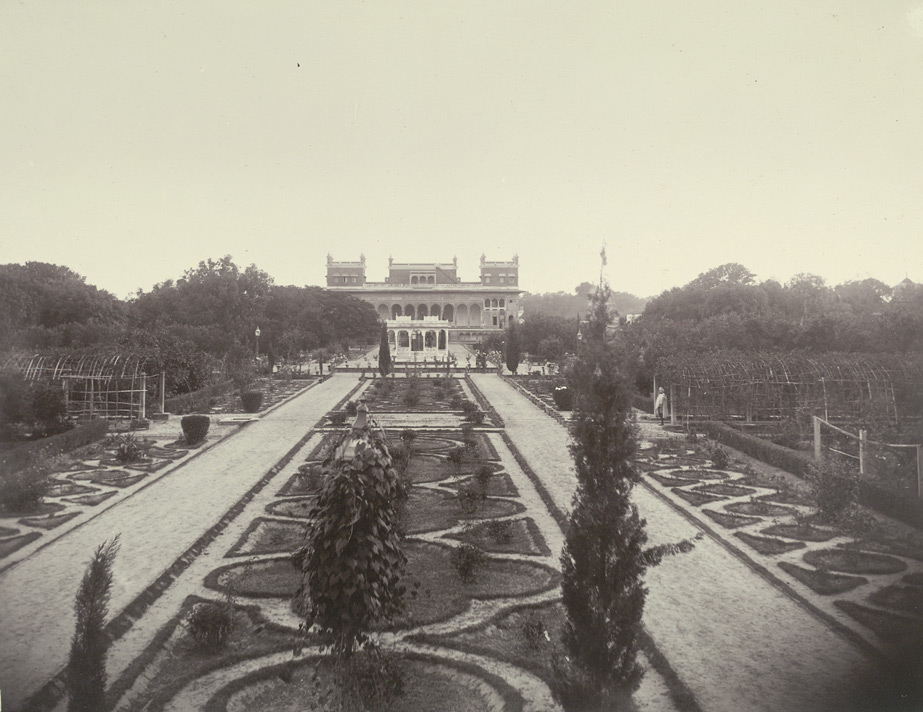
Rambagh Garden within the Ramnagar fort, 1905

The fort is at a scenic location on the eastern right bank of the Ganges River, opposite to the Varanasi Ghats. It is 14 kilometres (8.7 mi) from Varanasi and 2 kilometres (1.2 mi) from the Benares Hindu University by the newly built Ramnagar bridge. With the bridge built it hardly takes 10 minutes to reach the fort from BHU. Boat ride to the fort from Dashashwamedh Ghat in Varanasi takes about an hour. A painted state barge with a twin emblems in the form of horses could be seen moored to the landing stage. There is a well laid out garden within the fort which forms the approach to the palace.

== History ==
The Ramnagar Fort was built by Kashi Naresh Maharaja Balwant Singh in 1750. Inscriptions on the outer ramparts of the fort date it to the seventeenth century.

== Architecture ==
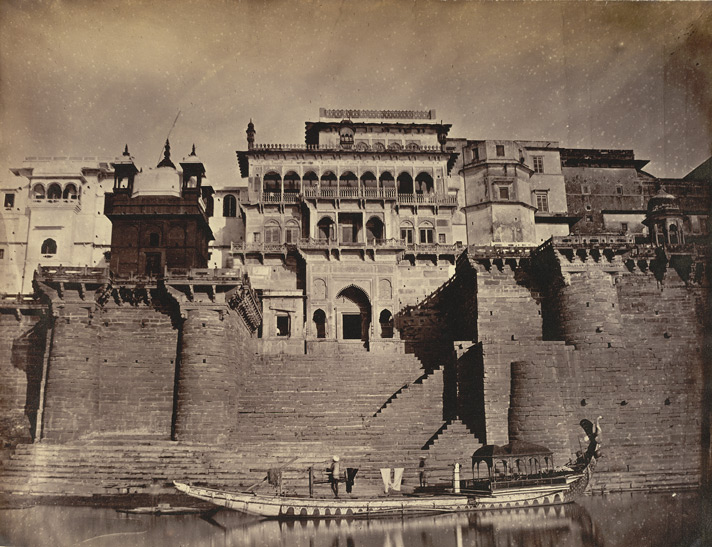
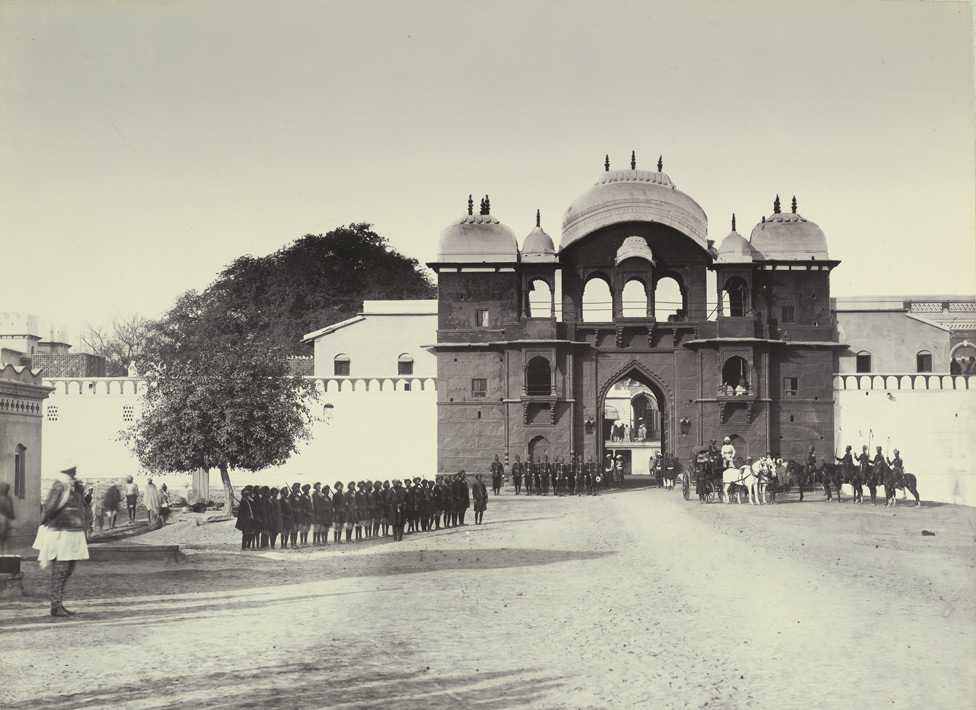
Left: The Maharaja's Fort, front view, 1869. Right: Entrance gate to the fort, 1905.

The building was constructed with creamy-coloured chunar sandstone. The fort houses the Veda Vyasa Temple, a museum, and the king's residential complex. There is also a Dakshin Mukhi temple of Hanuman, which faces towards south.

The fort has been built on high ground, which is above the flood level. The fort has many carved balconies, open courtyards and pavilions. Only a part of the structure is open for public viewing as the rest of it is the residence of Kashi Naresh and his family. The flag on the fort is raised when the Maharaja is in residence in his palace fort. Within the fort, the palace has two white towers, which are accessed by a flight of steps. At the end of the flight of steps, there is an archway and many courtyards that lead to the white tower. The private residence of the Maharaja is on one side of the tower while the Durbar Hall and reception rooms are on the other side. An inscription on the fort wall attests "Fortified House of the Rajah of Benares, with his state Boat".

== Museum ==
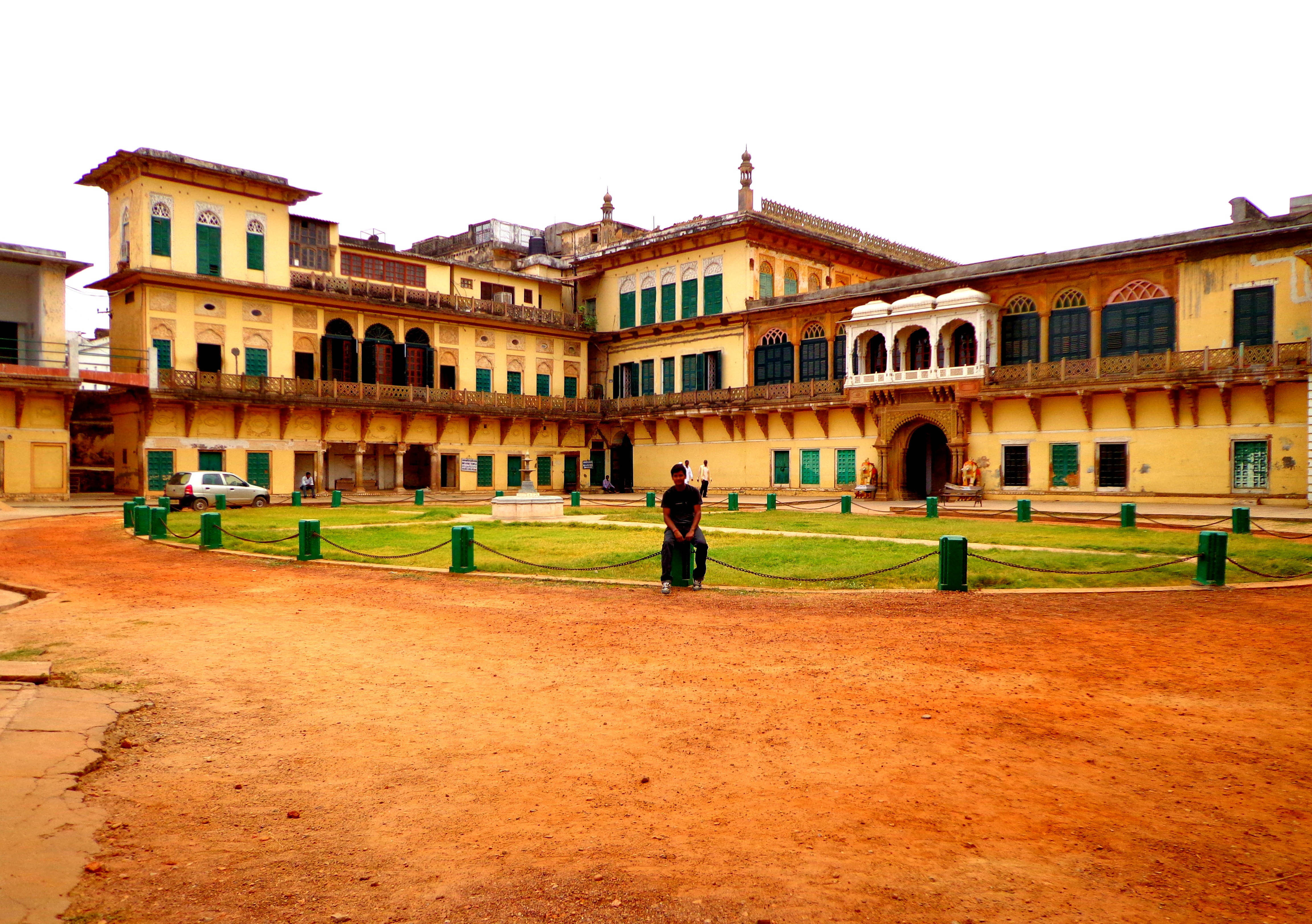
Ramnagar Fort

The museum is known as Saraswati Bhawan. The museum is in what used to be the Durbar Hall or the Public Audience Hall of the fort. It is well known for its unusual and rare collections of American vintage cars, bejeweled sedan chairs, ivory work, medieval costumes, gold and silver brocaded royal Palakis (Palanquins in the shape of a lotus flower). It has elephant saddles carved out of silver, jewellery, costumes made of kimkhwa silk (finest product of the weavers of Varanasi), an impressive armoury hall with swords, old guns from Africa, Burma and Japan. The old armoured matchlocks, ornate hookahs, daggers, portraits of Maharajas, black musical instruments which have turned white because of neglect of maintenance and there is a rare astronomical clock. This clock shows not only the time but also the year, month, week and day, and the astronomical details of the Sun, Moon and other planets. This clock was made in 1852 by the Astronomer at the Court of the Royal Palace of Varanasi. In addition, manuscripts, especially religious writings, are housed in the museum. Many books illustrated in the Mughal miniatures style are also part of the collections. There are five hundred and thirty-five illustrations expressing Islamic ethos, each having a decorative border with ornate floral designs or cartouches.

== Festivals ==
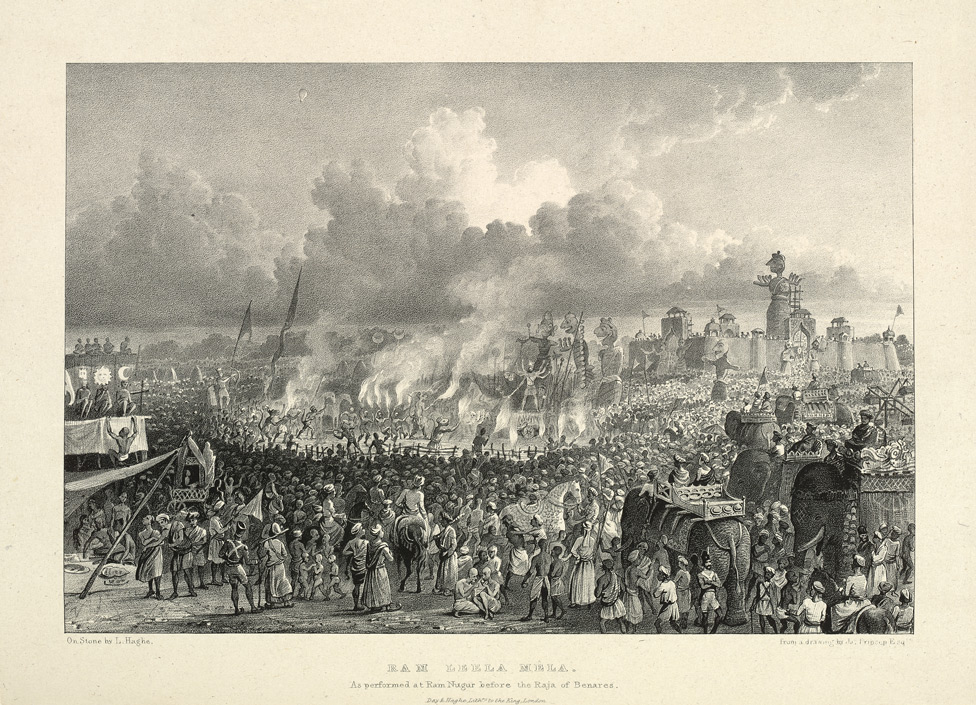
Ram Leela Mela. As Performed at Ram Nagar before the Raja of Benares, 1834

The fort palace appears very vibrant and colourful when beatified during the one-month-long Ram Lila festival where different episodes of Ramayana are enacted. On this occasion, a colourful pageant or procession of Ramayana epic is presented as part of the Dussehra celebrations that is held in October as per Gregorian Calendar, with the burning of the effigy of Ravana, the demon king, and his associates, which signifies victory of good over evil. The festival also includes a procession of various antique displays of Royal possessions. The Maharaja continues his family tradition of attending the annual month-long Ram Lila drama festival held in the streets behind the fort by riding on a decorated elephant at the head of the procession. In olden days, the drama was performed by the native regiments and the epic story of Ramayana scripture was read through the month-long festival. Other festivals held in the fort are in the month of Magh (January and February) in front of the Veda Vyasa temple where pilgrims visit Ramnagar. In the month of Phagun, (February and March) a festival called Raj Mangal is held in the fort with a procession of boats with people, dancing and singing; it starts from the Asi Ghat, goes along the river in front of the fort.

== In popular culture ==
Because of its scenic location on the banks of the Ganges, the fort and the palace are frequently used as an outdoor shooting location for films. The film titled Banaras is one of the popular movies shot here. It was the seventh pit stop of The Amazing Race 18.

== Gallery ==
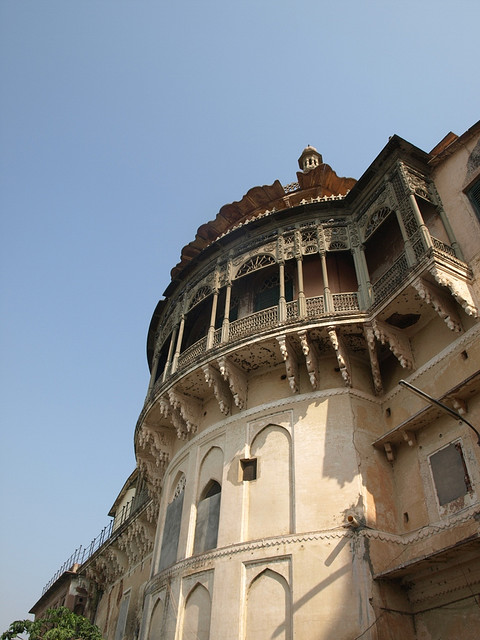
Balcony of the fort

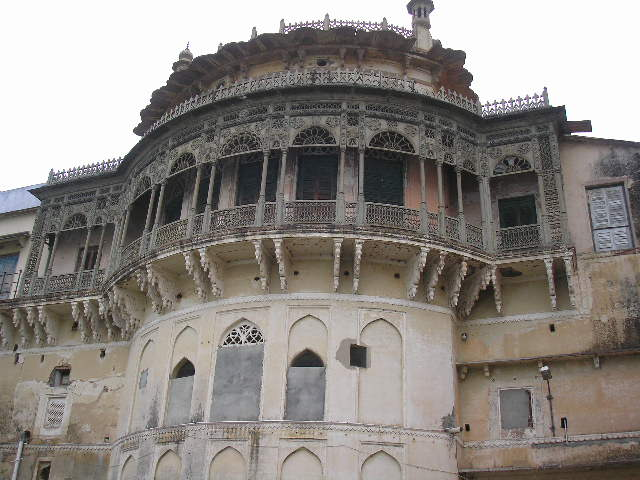
Balcony

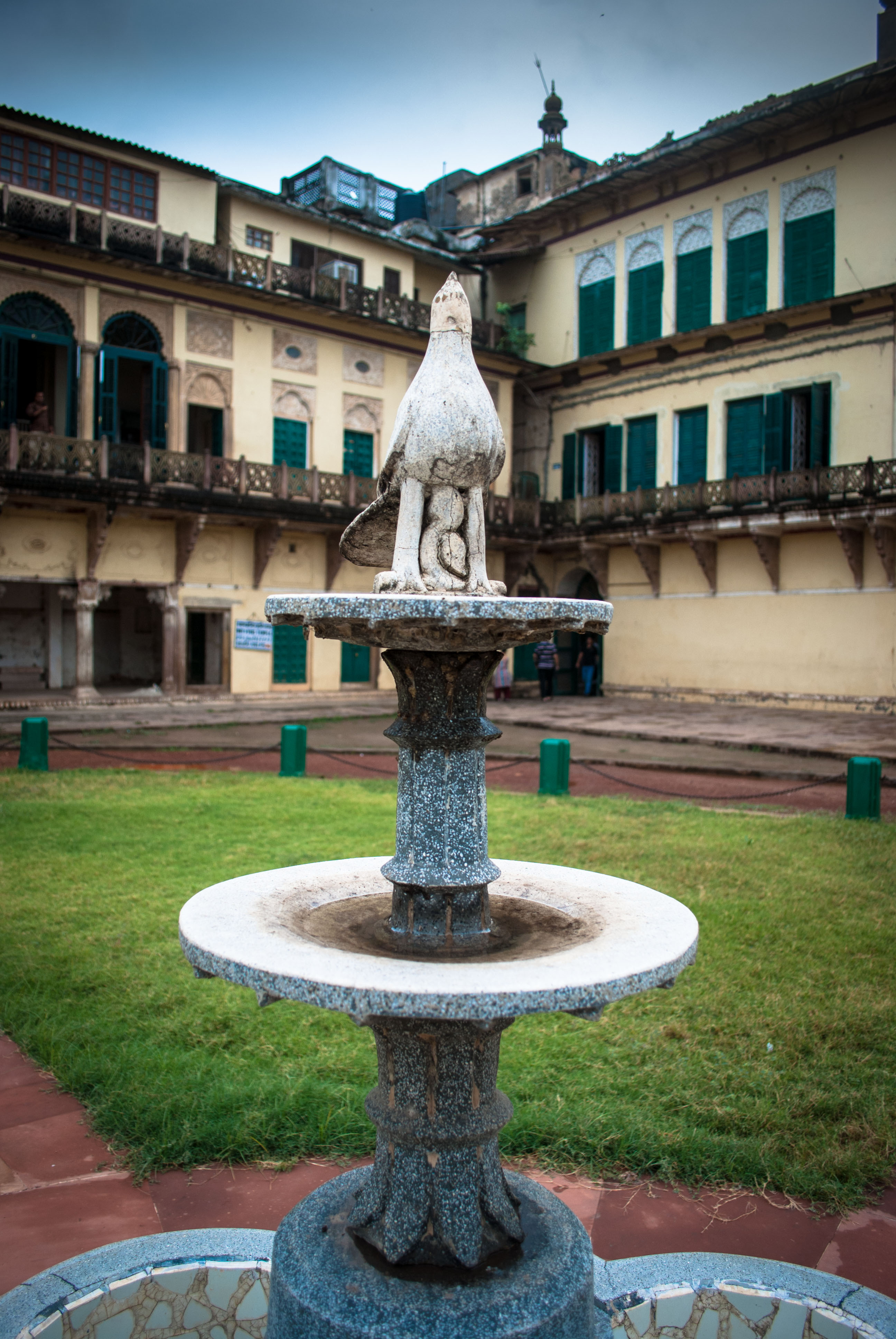
Fountain in the courtyard

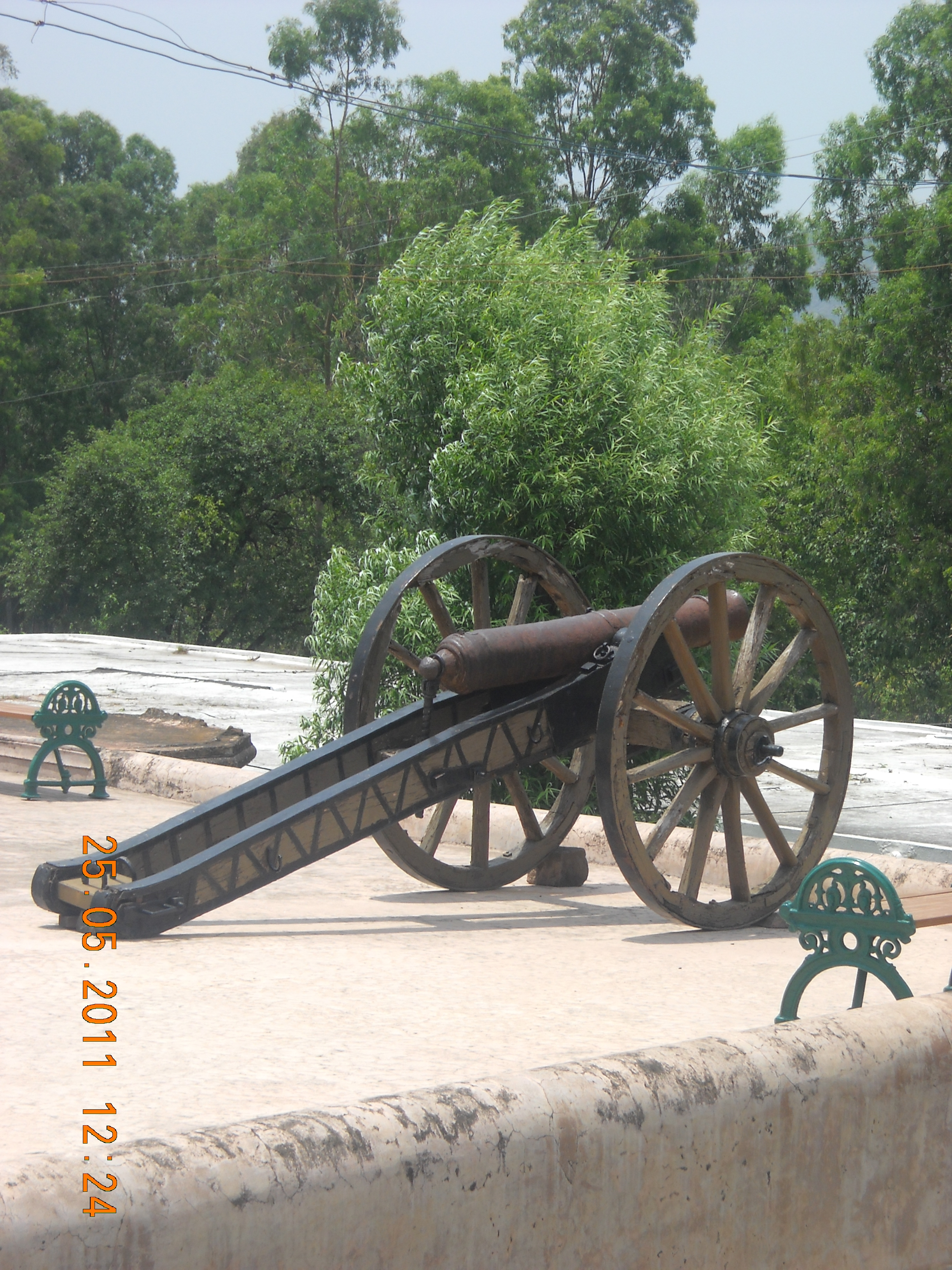
Cannon outside the fort

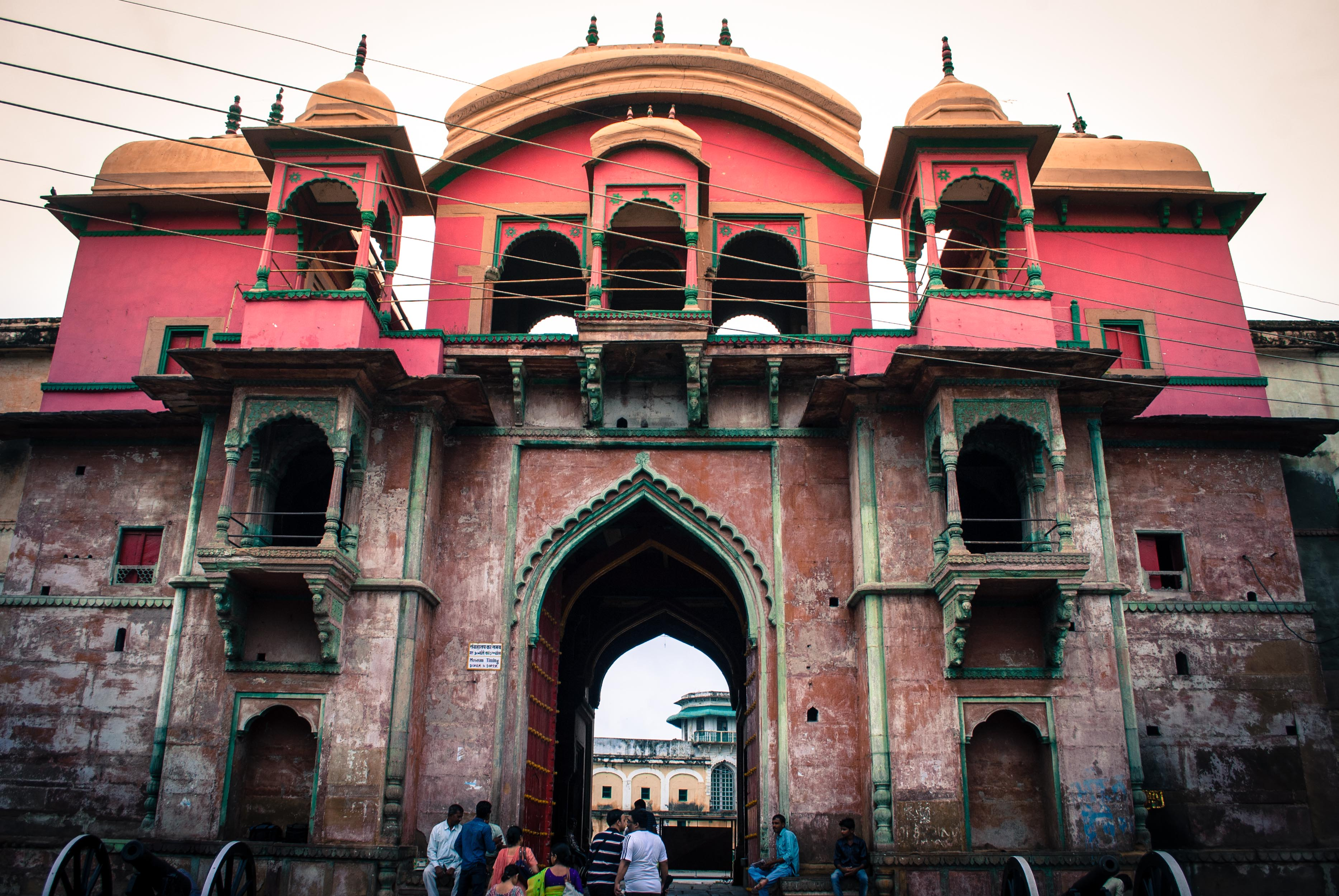
Main entrance

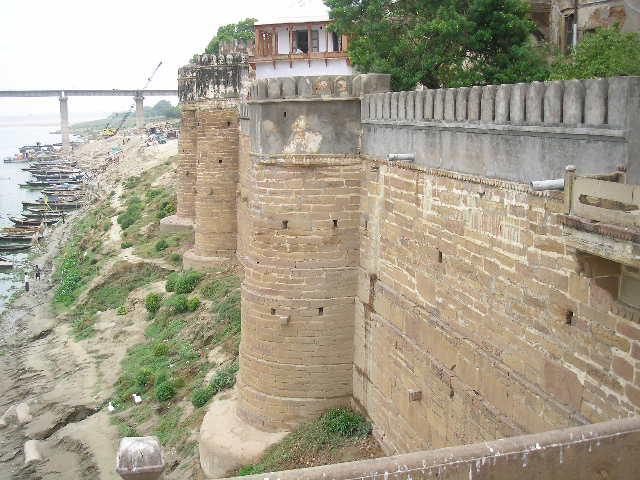
Outer wall

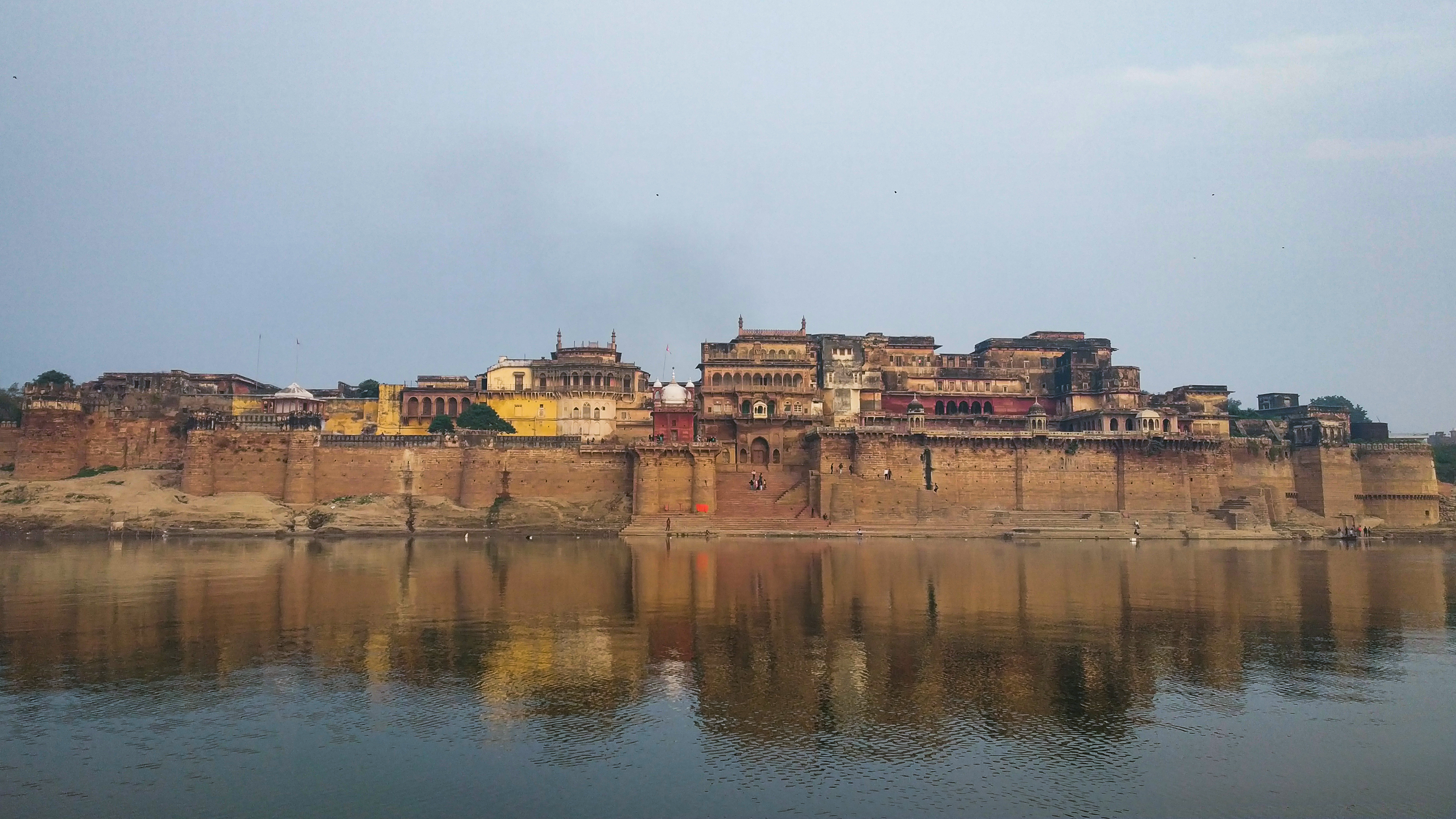
The fort across the Ganges River

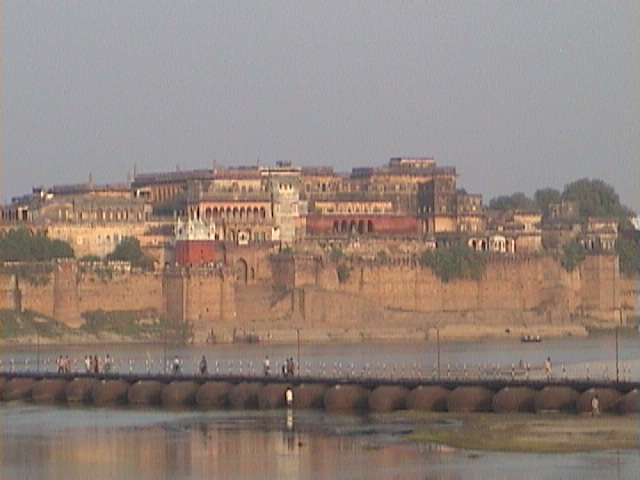
Ganges River

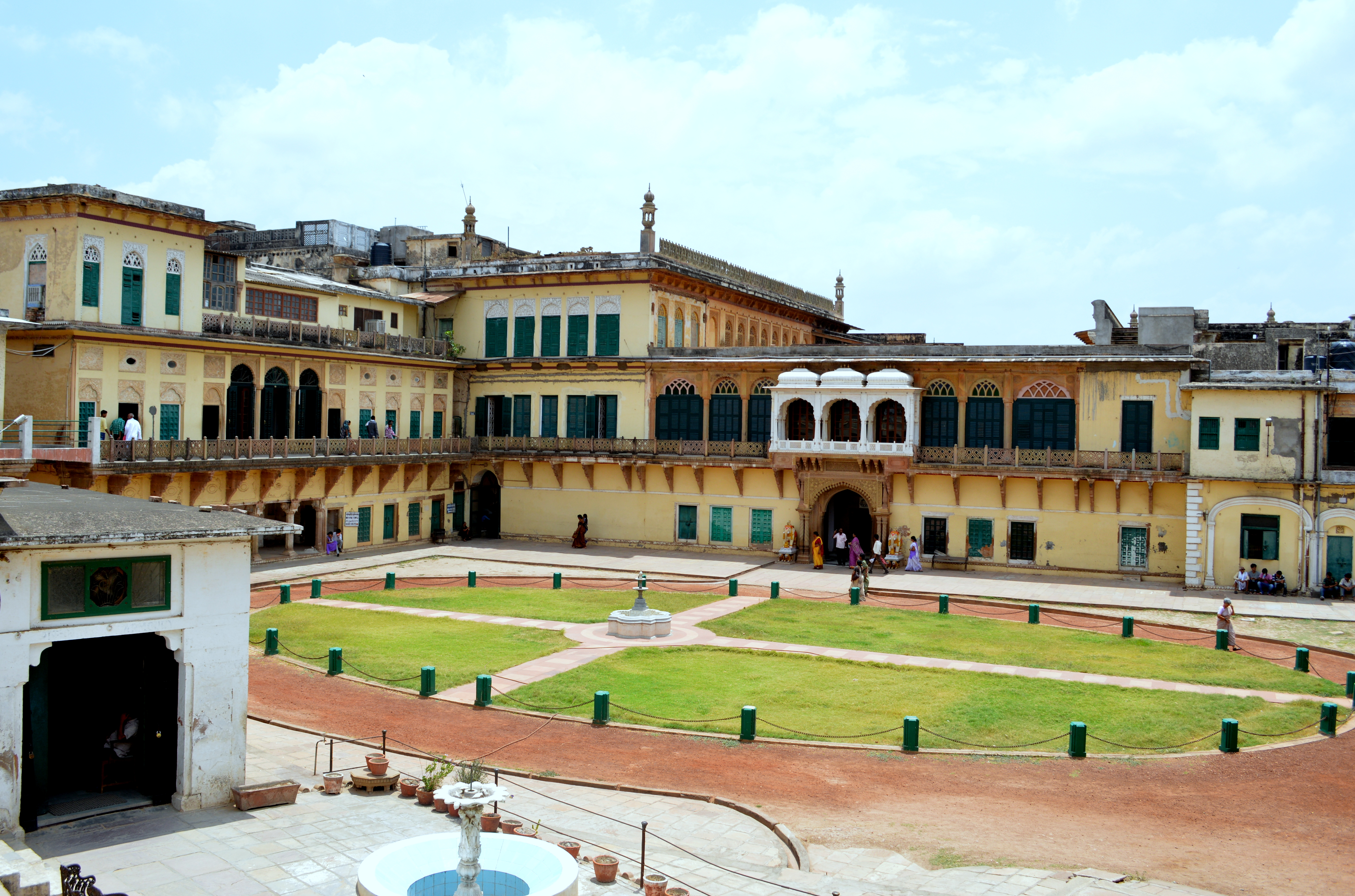
Inner Courtyard

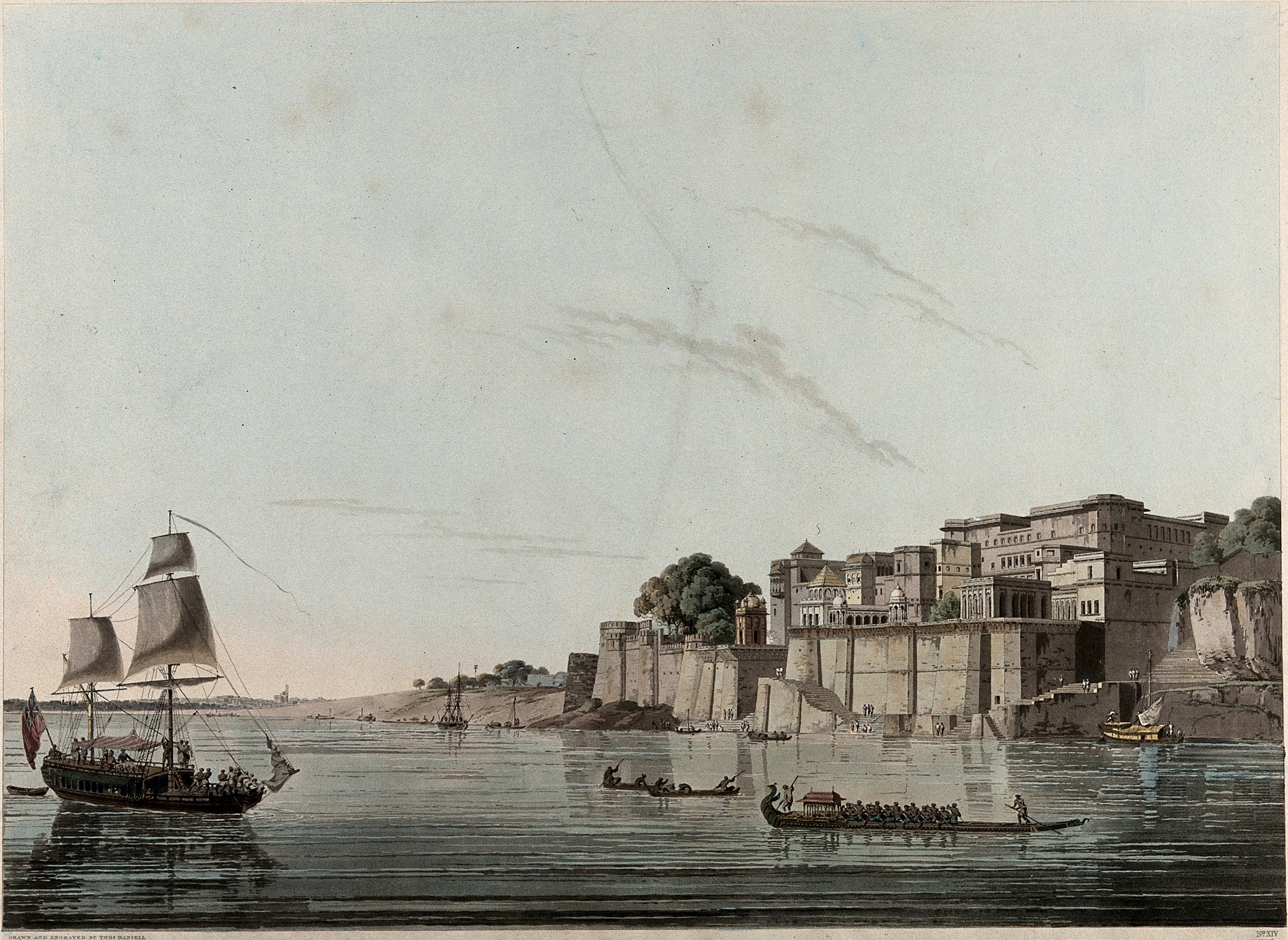
Painting of the fort c.1796

== See also ==
- List of forts in Uttar Pradesh
