= Ramanagar, Indi =

Ramanagar
- village
- Location in Karnataka, India
- Coordinates: 17.170993°N 76.021342°E
- Country: India
- State: Karnataka
- District: Bijapur
- Taluks: Indi

Government
  - Body: Village Panchayat

Area
  - Total: 8.42 km^{2} (3.25 sq mi)

Population (2011)
  - Total: 487
  - Density: 57.8/km^{2} (150/sq mi)

Languages
  - Official: Kannada
- Time zone: UTC+5:30 (IST)
- Nearest city: Bijapur
- Civic agency: Village Panchayat

Ramanagar is a village in the southern state of Karnataka, India. It is located in the outskirts of Indi situated in Indi Taluk of Bijapur.

== Demographics ==
=== 2011 ===
2011 Census data
Population	Persons	Males	Females
Total	487	262	225
In the age group 0–6 years	71	44	27
Scheduled Castes (SC)	475	256	219
Scheduled Tribes (ST)	0	0	0
Literates	199	133	66
Illiterate	288	129	159
Total Worker	298	154	144
Main Worker	242	124	118
Main Worker - Cultivator	172	88	84
Main Worker - Agricultural Labourers	2	1	1
Main Worker - Household Industries	15	6	9
Main Worker - Other	53	29	24
Marginal Worker	56	30	26
Marginal Worker - Cultivator	34	18	16
Marginal Worker - Agriculture Labourers	0	0	0
Marginal Worker - Household Industries	2	0	2
Marginal Workers - Other	20	12	8
Marginal Worker (3-6 Months)	55	30	25
Marginal Worker - Cultivator (3-6 Months)	34	18	16
Marginal Worker - Agriculture Labourers (3-6 Months)	0	0	0
Marginal Worker - Household Industries (3-6 Months)	1	0	1
Marginal Worker - Other (3-6 Months)	20	12	8
Marginal Worker (0-3 Months)	1	0	1
Marginal Worker - Cultivator (0-3 Months)	0	0	0
Marginal Worker - Agriculture Labourers (0-3 Months)	0	0	0
Marginal Worker - Household Industries (0-3 Months)	1	0	1
Marginal Worker - Other Workers (0-3 Months)	0	0	0
Non Worker	189	108	81
