= Ramnagar, Bajpur =

- village
- Location in Uttarakhand, India
- Coordinates: 29.0716°N 79.1498°E
- Country: India
- State: Uttarakhand
- District: Udham Singh Nagar district

Government
  - Body: Grama Panchayat

Population
  - Total: 2,179

Languages
  - Official: Hindi
- Time zone: UTC+5:30 (IST)
- ISO 3166 code: IN-UK
- Vehicle registration: UK
- Website: uk.gov.in

Ramnagar, is a village in Bajpur, Udham Singh Nagar district in the state of Uttarakhand in India.

== Demographics ==
According to the 2011 Indian Census, the town consists of 2,179 people. The state of Uttarakhand has literacy rate of 87.6 percent which is higher than Nation's average of 74.04 percent.

Total Number of Household : 371
Population	Persons	Males	Females
Total	2,179	1,114	1,065
In the age group 0–6 years	368	189	179
Scheduled Castes (SC)	20	13	7
Scheduled Tribes (ST)	0	0	0
Literates	1,164	680	484
Illiterate	1,015	434	581
Total Worker	656	552	104
Main Worker	562	514	48
Main Worker - Cultivator	155	150	5
Main Worker - Agricultural Labourers	291	258	33
Main Worker - Household Industries	11	11	0
Main Worker - Other	105	95	10
Marginal Worker	94	38	56
Marginal Worker - Cultivator	0	0	0
Marginal Worker - Agriculture Labourers	90	35	55
Marginal Worker - Household Industries	1	1	0
Marginal Workers - Other	3	2	1
Marginal Worker (3-6 Months)	24	17	7
Marginal Worker - Cultivator (3-6 Months)	0	0	0
Marginal Worker - Agriculture Labourers (3-6 Months)	21	14	7
Marginal Worker - Household Industries (3-6 Months)	1	1	0
Marginal Worker - Other (3-6 Months)	2	2	0
Marginal Worker (0-3 Months)	70	21	49
Marginal Worker - Cultivator (0-3 Months)	0	0	0
Marginal Worker - Agriculture Labourers (0-3 Months)	69	21	48
Marginal Worker - Household Industries (0-3 Months)	0	0	0
Marginal Worker - Other Workers (0-3 Months)	1	0	1
Non Worker	1,523	562	961
