= Ramnagar, Varanasi =

Ramnagar
- city
- Location in Uttar Pradesh, India Ramnagar (Uttar Pradesh)
- Coordinates: 25.28°N 83.03°E
- Country: India
- State: Uttar Pradesh
- District: Varanasi
- Elevation: 64 m (210 ft)

Population (2011)
  - Total: 49,132

Languages
  - Official: Hindi, English
- Time zone: UTC+5:30 (IST)
- PIN: 221008
- Telephone code: 0542
- Vehicle registration: UP-65
- Website: up.gov.in

Ramnagar is a town, just adjacent to Varanasi city and a municipal board in Varanasi district in the Indian state of Uttar Pradesh. Ramnagar has a fort known as Ramnagar Fort which is still the residence of King of Varanasi (Benares). He was known as Kashi Naresh meaning king of Kashi (Ancient name of Beneres) and is still regarded by old residents of the city of Varanasi. Ramnagar Fort and its museum are the repository of the history of the kings of Benares and since the 18th century has been the home of Kashi Naresh. Even today the Kashi Naresh is deeply revered by the people of Benares. He is the religious head and the people of Benares consider him the incarnation of Shiva. He is also the chief cultural patron and an essential part of all religious celebrations. Ramnagar is popular for Ramlila that is held annually under the aegis of King of Varanasi.

Recently Ramnagar has emerged as a favourite spot for shooting movies because of the scenic location of the Ramnagar Fort (residence of the King of Varanasi) near the Ganges. Chokher Bali, Raanjhanaa are one of the popular movies shot here. Amazon Prime web series Mirzapur and Anurag Kashyap Gangs of Wasseypur was also shot in Ramnagar. The town has many century-old houses and structures near the fort area.

== History ==
The Ramnagar Fort was built by Kashi Naresh Raja Balwant Singh with creamy chunar sandstone in the eighteenth century. It is a typically Mughal style of architecture with carved balconies, open courtyards, and picturesque pavilions.

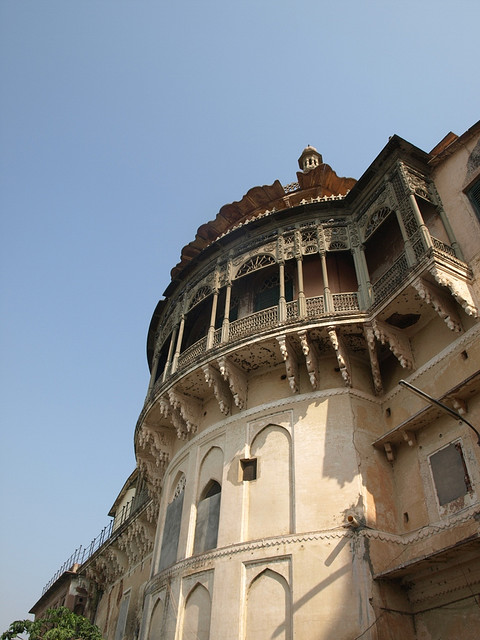
Ramnagar Fort near Varanasi

== Ramlila ==
Over a million pilgrims arrive annually for the vast processions and performances of Ramlila organized by Kashi Naresh. The Ramlila of Ramnagar basically operated by Maharaja of Banaras with the help of Pt. Laxmi Narayan Pandey and his cultural family every year. The show takes place once yearly. The venues are scattered across Ramnagar, Lanka, Janakpuri, PAC, Kodopur and several small areas.

== Geographical indication ==
Ramnagar Bhanta (Brinjal) was awarded the Geographical Indication (GI) status tag from the Geographical Indications Registry, under the Union Government of India, on 31 March 2023 and is valid until 3 November 2030.

Kashi Vishwanath Farmer Producer Company from Varanasi, proposed the GI registration of Ramnagar Bhanta (Brinjal). After filing the application in November 2020, the Brinjal was granted the GI tag in 2023 by the Geographical Indication Registry in Chennai, making the name "Ramnagar Bhanta (Brinjal)" exclusive to the Brinjal grown in the region. It thus became the first brinjal variety from Uttar Pradesh and the 45th type of goods from Uttar Pradesh to earn the GI tag.

The GI tag protects the brinjal from illegal selling and marketing, and gives it legal protection and a unique identity.

== Demographics ==
As of the 2011 Census of India, Ramnagar had a population of 49,132. Males constitute 53% of the population and females 47%. Ramnagar has an average literacy rate of 70%, lower than the national average of 74.4%: male literacy is 57%, and female literacy is 43%. In Ramnagar, 15% of the population is under 6 years of age.
