= Ramnagar Rural Municipality =

Ramnagar रामनगर
- Rural Municipality
- Location in Nepal
- Coordinates: 26.84°N 85.37°E
- Country: Nepal
- Development Region: Central
- Zone: Janakpur
- District: Sarlahi District
- Province: Madhesh pradesh
- Established: 2016 A.D. (2073 B.S.)

Area
  - Total: 26.44 km^{2} (10.21 sq mi)

Population (2011)
  - Total: 40,128
  - Density: 1,518/km^{2} (3,931/sq mi)
  - Religions: Hindu Muslim Christian

Languages
  - Local: Maithili, Tharu, Nepali
- Time zone: UTC+5:45 (NST)
- Postal Code: 45800
- Area code: 046
- Website: https://www.ramnagarmun.gov.np/

Ramnagar (Nepali: रामनगर) is a rural municipality in Sarlahi District, a part of Province No. 2 in Nepal. It was formed in 2016 occupying current 7 sections (wards) from previous 7 former VDCs. It occupies an area of 26.44 km^{2} with a total population of 40,128.
