= Ramnagar, Kashipur =

- village
- Location in Uttarakhand, India
- Coordinates: 29.217061996807434°N 79.0101549415064°E
- Country: India
- State: Uttarakhand
- District: Udham Singh Nagar district

Government
  - Body: Grama Panchayat

Population
  - Total: 836

Languages
  - Official: Hindi
- Time zone: UTC+5:30 (IST)
- ISO 3166 code: IN-UK
- Vehicle registration: UK
- Website: uk.gov.in

Ramnagar Kashipur, is a village in Kashipur, Udham Singh Nagar district in the state of Uttarakhand in India.

== Demographics ==
According to the 2011 Indian Census, the town consists of 836 people. The state of Uttarakhand has literacy rate of 87.6 percent which is higher than Nation's average of 74.04 percent.

Total Number of Household : 141
| Population | Persons | Males | Females |
|---|---|---|---|
| Total | 836 | 444 | 392 |
| In the age group 0–6 years | 109 | 60 | 49 |
| Scheduled Castes (SC) | 555 | 289 | 266 |
| Scheduled Tribes (ST) | 0 | 0 | 0 |
| Literates | 526 | 317 | 209 |
| Illiterate | 310 | 127 | 183 |
| Total Worker | 318 | 223 | 95 |
| Main Worker | 306 | 217 | 89 |
| Main Worker - Cultivator | 59 | 51 | 8 |
| Main Worker - Agricultural Labourers | 113 | 70 | 43 |
| Main Worker - Household Industries | 2 | 2 | 0 |
| Main Worker - Other | 132 | 94 | 38 |
| Marginal Worker | 12 | 6 | 6 |
| Marginal Worker - Cultivator | 1 | 0 | 1 |
| Marginal Worker - Agriculture Labourers | 3 | 0 | 3 |
| Marginal Worker - Household Industries | 0 | 0 | 0 |
| Marginal Workers - Other | 8 | 6 | 2 |
| Marginal Worker (3-6 Months) | 11 | 6 | 5 |
| Marginal Worker - Cultivator (3-6 Months) | 0 | 0 | 0 |
| Marginal Worker - Agriculture Labourers (3-6 Months) | 3 | 0 | 3 |
| Marginal Worker - Household Industries (3-6 Months) | 0 | 0 | 0 |
| Marginal Worker - Other (3-6 Months) | 8 | 6 | 2 |
| Marginal Worker (0-3 Months) | 1 | 0 | 1 |
| Marginal Worker - Cultivator (0-3 Months) | 1 | 0 | 1 |
| Marginal Worker - Agriculture Labourers (0-3 Months) | 0 | 0 | 0 |
| Marginal Worker - Household Industries (0-3 Months) | 0 | 0 | 0 |
| Marginal Worker - Other Workers (0-3 Months) | 0 | 0 | 0 |
| Non Worker | 518 | 221 | 297 |
