= Naad (K.D.) =

Village in Karnataka, India

Naad K.D. is a village in the southern state of Karnataka, India. It is located in the Indi taluk of Bijapur district in Karnataka. It is about 19 km from Indi.
