= Ramnagar, Diglipur =

Coordinates: 13.0820°N 93.0094°E

Ramnagar (or Ram Nagar) is a village in the southeastern part of North Andaman Island. It belongs to the Diglipur county, Andaman and Nicobar territory of India. It has a population of about 1400 people.

The village lies about 18 km south of Diglipur and 7.5 km south of Saddle Peak, the highest point of North Andaman. It is a major tourist destination in North Andaman, for being next to Taralait Bay and the Ram Nagar Beach, and the nearest village to Chalis Ek and Alfred caves.
