= Ramnagar Range, Nainital =

- village
- Location in Uttarakhand, India
- Coordinates: 29.284337326945764°N 79.09768551274428°E
- Country: India
- State: Uttarakhand
- District: Nainital district

Government
  - Body: Grama Panchayat

Population
  - Total: 2,103

Languages
  - Official: Hindi
- Time zone: UTC+5:30 (IST)
- ISO 3166 code: IN-UK
- Vehicle registration: UK
- Website: uk.gov.in

Ramnagar Range, is an inhabited forest and village in Ramnagar, Nainital district in the state of Uttarakhand in India.

== Demographics ==
According to the 2011 Indian Census, the town consists of 2,103 people. The state of Uttarakhand has literacy rate of 87.6 percent which is higher than Nation's average of 74.04 percent.

Total Number of Household : 414
Population	Persons	Males	Females
Total	2,103	1,088	1,015
In the age group 0–6 years	344	178	166
Scheduled Castes (SC)	538	281	257
Scheduled Tribes (ST)	0	0	0
Literates	1,102	658	444
Illiterate	1,001	430	571
Total Worker	855	569	286
Main Worker	431	260	171
Main Worker - Cultivator	141	72	69
Main Worker - Agricultural Labourers	55	36	19
Main Worker - Household Industries	100	54	46
Main Worker - Other	135	98	37
Marginal Worker	424	309	115
Marginal Worker - Cultivator	47	25	22
Marginal Worker - Agriculture Labourers	236	173	63
Marginal Worker - Household Industries	5	5	0
Marginal Workers - Other	136	106	30
Marginal Worker (3-6 Months)	280	192	88
Marginal Worker - Cultivator (3-6 Months)	44	22	22
Marginal Worker - Agriculture Labourers (3-6 Months)	141	96	45
Marginal Worker - Household Industries (3-6 Months)	4	4	0
Marginal Worker - Other (3-6 Months)	91	70	21
Marginal Worker (0-3 Months)	144	117	27
Marginal Worker - Cultivator (0-3 Months)	3	3	0
Marginal Worker - Agriculture Labourers (0-3 Months)	95	77	18
Marginal Worker - Household Industries (0-3 Months)	1	1	0
Marginal Worker - Other Workers (0-3 Months)	45	36	9
Non Worker	1,248	519	729
