= Ramnagar, Parasi =

Ramnagar सुनवल नगरपालीका
- Village development committee
- Location in Nepal
- Coordinates: 27.59°N 83.70°E
- Country: Nepal
- Zone: Lumbini Zone
- District: Nawalparasi District

Government
  - ward President: Yem lal pandey

Population (2001)
  - Total: 12,525
- Time zone: UTC+5:45 (Nepal Time)

Ramnagar is a village development committee in Nawalparasi District in the Lumbini Zone of southern Nepal. At the time of the 2001 Nepal census it had a population of 12,525 people living in 1,532 individual households.

To promote local culture, Ramnagar has one FM radio, Radio Daunne - 103.4 MHz, which is a community radio station.
