= Ramnagar, Basavana Bagevadi =

Ramnagar
- village
- Location in Karnataka, India
- Coordinates: 16.687911008939242°N 76.06164974796695°E
- Country: India
- State: Karnataka
- District: Bijapur
- Taluks: Basavana Bagevadi

Government
  - Body: Village Panchayat

Population (2011)
  - Total: 1,287

Languages
  - Official: Kannada
- Time zone: UTC+5:30 (IST)
- Nearest city: Bijapur
- Civic agency: Village Panchayat

Ramnagar is a village in the southern state of Karnataka, India. It is situated in Basavana Bagevadi Taluk of Bijapur.

== Demographics ==
=== 2011 ===
2011 Census data
Population	Persons	Males	Females
Total	1,287	681	606
In the age group 0–6 years	217	117	100
Scheduled Castes (SC)	1,279	676	603
Scheduled Tribes (ST)	0	0	0
Literates	553	388	165
Illiterate	734	293	441
Total Worker	510	331	179
Main Worker	420	254	166
Main Worker - Cultivator	62	58	4
Main Worker - Agricultural Labourers	240	112	128
Main Worker - Household Industries	2	1	1
Main Worker - Other	116	83	33
Marginal Worker	90	77	13
Marginal Worker - Cultivator	0	0	0
Marginal Worker - Agriculture Labourers	70	62	8
Marginal Worker - Household Industries	1	1	0
Marginal Workers - Other	19	14	5
Marginal Worker (3-6 Months)	89	77	12
Marginal Worker - Cultivator (3-6 Months)	0	0	0
Marginal Worker - Agriculture Labourers (3-6 Months)	70	62	8
Marginal Worker - Household Industries (3-6 Months)	1	1	0
Marginal Worker - Other (3-6 Months)	18	14	4
Marginal Worker (0-3 Months)	1	0	1
Marginal Worker - Cultivator (0-3 Months)	0	0	0
Marginal Worker - Agriculture Labourers (0-3 Months)	0	0	0
Marginal Worker - Household Industries (0-3 Months)	0	0	0
Marginal Worker - Other Workers (0-3 Months)	1	0	1
Non Worker	777	350	427
