= Ramnagar, Yadgir =

Ramnagar
- village
- Location in Karnataka, India
- Coordinates: 16.490929115001048°N 76.43939340246682°E
- Country: India
- State: Karnataka
- District: Yadgir
- Taluks: Shorapur

Government
  - Body: Village Panchayat

Population (2011)
  - Total: 2,124

Languages
  - Official: Kannada
- Time zone: UTC+5:30 (IST)
- Nearest city: Yadgir
- Civic agency: Village Panchayat

Ramnagar is a village in the southern state of Karnataka, India. It is situated in Shorapur Taluk of Yadgir.

== Demographics ==
=== 2011 ===
2011 Census data
Population	Persons	Males	Females
Total	2,124	1,074	1,050
In the age group 0–6 years	410	207	203
Scheduled Castes (SC)	1,864	939	925
Scheduled Tribes (ST)	76	40	36
Literates	826	559	267
Illiterate	1,298	515	783
Total Worker	764	496	268
Main Worker	232	147	85
Main Worker - Cultivator	100	79	21
Main Worker - Agricultural Labourers	119	60	59
Main Worker - Household Industries	1	1	0
Main Worker - Other	12	7	5
Marginal Worker	532	349	183
Marginal Worker - Cultivator	9	3	6
Marginal Worker - Agriculture Labourers	489	319	170
Marginal Worker - Household Industries	10	8	2
Marginal Workers - Other	24	19	5
Marginal Worker (3-6 Months)	509	338	171
Marginal Worker - Cultivator (3-6 Months)	9	3	6
Marginal Worker - Agriculture Labourers (3-6 Months)	467	309	158
Marginal Worker - Household Industries (3-6 Months)	9	7	2
Marginal Worker - Other (3-6 Months)	24	19	5
Marginal Worker (0-3 Months)	23	11	12
Marginal Worker - Cultivator (0-3 Months)	0	0	0
Marginal Worker - Agriculture Labourers (0-3 Months)	22	10	12
Marginal Worker - Household Industries (0-3 Months)	1	1	0
Marginal Worker - Other Workers (0-3 Months)	0	0	0
Non Worker	1,360	578	782
