= Ramanagar, Belagavi =

Ramanagar
- Village
- Location in Karnataka, India
- Coordinates: 15.77834952313342°N 75.15311839228221°E
- Country: India
- State: Karnataka
- District: Belgaum
- Taluks: Saundatti

Population (2011)
  - Total: 973

Languages
  - Official: Kannada
- Time zone: UTC+5:30 (IST)
- ISO 3166 code: IN-KA

Ramanagar is a village in Belgaum district of Karnataka, India.

== Demographics ==
=== 2011 ===
2011 Census data
Population	Persons	Males	Females
Total	973	471	502
In the age group 0–6 years	210	118	92
Scheduled Castes (SC)	954	461	493
Scheduled Tribes (ST)	0	0	0
Literates	530	285	245
Illiterate	443	186	257
Total Worker	443	226	217
Main Worker	441	225	216
Main Worker - Cultivator	76	62	14
Main Worker - Agricultural Labourers	344	148	196
Main Worker - Household Industries	2	2	0
Main Worker - Other	19	13	6
Marginal Worker	2	1	1
Marginal Worker - Cultivator	1	0	1
Marginal Worker - Agriculture Labourers	1	1	0
Marginal Worker - Household Industries	0	0	0
Marginal Workers - Other	0	0	0
Marginal Worker (3-6 Months)	2	1	1
Marginal Worker - Cultivator (3-6 Months)	1	0	1
Marginal Worker - Agriculture Labourers (3-6 Months)	1	1	0
Marginal Worker - Household Industries (3-6 Months)	0	0	0
Marginal Worker - Other (3-6 Months)	0	0	0
Marginal Worker (0-3 Months)	0	0	0
Marginal Worker - Cultivator (0-3 Months)	0	0	0
Marginal Worker - Agriculture Labourers (0-3 Months)	0	0	0
Marginal Worker - Household Industries (0-3 Months)	0	0	0
Marginal Worker - Other Workers (0-3 Months)	0	0	0
Non Worker	530	245	285
