= Ramnagar, Kalaburagi =

Ramnagar
- village
- Location in Karnataka, India
- Coordinates: 17.290818258296632°N 76.14485078250877°E
- Country: India
- State: Karnataka
- District: Kalaburagi
- Taluks: Afzalpur

Government
  - Body: Village Panchayat

Population (2011)
  - Total: 685

Languages
  - Official: Kannada
- Time zone: UTC+5:30 (IST)
- Nearest city: Kalaburagi
- Civic agency: Village Panchayat

Ramnagar is a village in the southern state of Karnataka, India. It is situated in Afzalpur Taluk of Kalaburagi.

== Demographics ==
=== 2011 ===
2011 Census data
Population	Persons	Males	Females
Total	685	359	326
In the age group 0–6 years	99	53	46
Scheduled Castes (SC)	0	0	0
Scheduled Tribes (ST)	7	4	3
Literates	328	195	133
Illiterate	357	164	193
Total Worker	234	171	63
Main Worker	145	133	12
Main Worker - Cultivator	53	51	2
Main Worker - Agricultural Labourers	64	59	5
Main Worker - Household Industries	1	1	0
Main Worker - Other	27	22	5
Marginal Worker	89	38	51
Marginal Worker - Cultivator	12	11	1
Marginal Worker - Agriculture Labourers	76	26	50
Marginal Worker - Household Industries	0	0	0
Marginal Workers - Other	1	1	0
Marginal Worker (3-6 Months)	84	35	49
Marginal Worker - Cultivator (3-6 Months)	10	9	1
Marginal Worker - Agriculture Labourers (3-6 Months)	73	25	48
Marginal Worker - Household Industries (3-6 Months)	0	0	0
Marginal Worker - Other (3-6 Months)	1	1	0
Marginal Worker (0-3 Months)	5	3	2
Marginal Worker - Cultivator (0-3 Months)	2	2	0
Marginal Worker - Agriculture Labourers (0-3 Months)	3	1	2
Marginal Worker - Household Industries (0-3 Months)	0	0	0
Marginal Worker - Other Workers (0-3 Months)	0	0	0
Non Worker	451	188	263
