= Ramnagar, Bijapur =

Ramnagar
- village
- Location in Karnataka, India
- Coordinates: 16.992288768305094°N 75.8324297598369°E
- Country: India
- State: Karnataka
- District: Bijapur
- Taluks: Bijapur

Government
  - Body: Village Panchayat

Population (2011)
  - Total: 2,043

Languages
  - Official: Kannada
- Time zone: UTC+5:30 (IST)
- Nearest city: Bijapur
- Civic agency: Village Panchayat

Ramnagar is a village in the southern state of Karnataka, India. It is situated in Bijapur Taluk of Bijapur.

== Demographics ==
=== 2011 ===
2011 Census data
| Population | Persons | Males | Females |
|---|---|---|---|
| Total | 2,043 | 1,096 | 947 |
| In the age group 0–6 years | 264 | 144 | 120 |
| Scheduled Castes (SC) | 2,008 | 1,079 | 929 |
| Scheduled Tribes (ST) | 0 | 0 | 0 |
| Literates | 1,284 | 864 | 420 |
| Illiterate | 759 | 232 | 527 |
| Total Worker | 646 | 444 | 202 |
| Main Worker | 627 | 429 | 198 |
| Main Worker - Cultivator | 103 | 99 | 4 |
| Main Worker - Agricultural Labourers | 352 | 173 | 179 |
| Main Worker - Household Industries | 9 | 9 | 0 |
| Main Worker - Other | 163 | 148 | 15 |
| Marginal Worker | 19 | 15 | 4 |
| Marginal Worker - Cultivator | 0 | 0 | 0 |
| Marginal Worker - Agriculture Labourers | 11 | 8 | 3 |
| Marginal Worker - Household Industries | 1 | 0 | 1 |
| Marginal Workers - Other | 7 | 7 | 0 |
| Marginal Worker (3-6 Months) | 16 | 12 | 4 |
| Marginal Worker - Cultivator (3-6 Months) | 0 | 0 | 0 |
| Marginal Worker - Agriculture Labourers (3-6 Months) | 9 | 6 | 3 |
| Marginal Worker - Household Industries (3-6 Months) | 1 | 0 | 1 |
| Marginal Worker - Other (3-6 Months) | 6 | 6 | 0 |
| Marginal Worker (0-3 Months) | 3 | 3 | 0 |
| Marginal Worker - Cultivator (0-3 Months) | 0 | 0 | 0 |
| Marginal Worker - Agriculture Labourers (0-3 Months) | 2 | 2 | 0 |
| Marginal Worker - Household Industries (0-3 Months) | 0 | 0 | 0 |
| Marginal Worker - Other Workers (0-3 Months) | 1 | 1 | 0 |
| Non Worker | 1,397 | 652 | 745 |
