= Lachyan, Karnataka =

Lachyan
- village
- Location in Karnataka, India Lachyan (India)
- Coordinates: 17°16′34.67″N 75°58′2.53″E
- Country: India
- State: Karnataka
- District: Bijapur

Languages
  - Official: Kannada
- Time zone: UTC+5:30 (IST)
- Postal code: 586211
- Vehicle registration: KA28

Lachyan is a village situated in the Indi Taluka of Bijapur district, Karnataka, India. As of the Population Census 2011, Lachyan is home to 4,586 people distributed across 865 families.

== Geography and Accessibility ==
Lachyan covers a vast area of 2,517 hectares, with the nearest town, Indi, located 12 kilometers away. The village is positioned 65 kilometers north of the Bijapur district headquarters and 596 kilometers from the state capital, Bangalore. The region is easily accessible, with a railway station available within the village and public and private bus services serving the locality.

== Temples and Landmarks ==
One of the notable landmarks in Bijapur District is the Shri Siddhaling Maharaj Math, a famous temple situated 65 kilometers north of the district headquarters and 13 kilometers from Indi. The temple is a spiritual center attracting devotees from various places.

Hindu temples are scattered around the village, with six temples located within a 1-kilometer radius of Shri Siddhaling Maharaj Math. As you expand the search radius to 5 and 10 kilometers, the number of Hindu temples increases to 16 and 32, respectively. Shri Lagamavva Devi is Goddess of Boundaries, even all people of Surrounding villages of Lachyan give visit to her temple.

== Demographics ==
The population of Lachyan comprises 2,401 males and 2,185 females, with a child population (age 0-6) of 578, constituting 12.60% of the total. The sex ratio in Lachyan is 910, slightly below the Karnataka state average of 973. The Child Sex Ratio is 993, surpassing the Karnataka average of 948.

In terms of literacy, Lachyan exhibits a rate of 69.31%, which is lower than the Karnataka state average of 75.36%. Male literacy stands at 79.35%, while female literacy is 58.14%.

== Governance and Economy ==
The village is administered by a Sarpanch, the elected head of the village, in accordance with the Panchayati Raj Act. As of 2019, Lachyan falls under the Indi assembly constituency and Vijayapura parliamentary constituency. Economic activities in the village engage 97.53% of the population in main work, with a focus on cultivation and agricultural labor.

The village has a significant Scheduled Caste (SC) population, constituting 27.45%, while Scheduled Tribe (ST) accounts for 1.70%. OBC, etc....

== Notable Personalities ==
Lachyan has been home to notable individuals, including Shashwad Babalgaon, known for his stunts in films such as "Sakra" (2023), "Expendables" (2023), and as a stunt coordinator in "Kung Fu Panda" (2024). Additionally, historical records mention Shri Ningondappa Babalagaon, who served as the Sarpanch, winning five consecutive terms in the 1900s or earlier.
