= Indi, Karnataka =

Indi
- City
- Location in Karnataka, India
- Coordinates: 17.168°N 75.967°E
- Country: India
- State: Karnataka
- District: Bijapur

Area
  - Total: 10.5 km^{2} (4.1 sq mi)
- Elevation: 464 m (1,522 ft)

Population (2001)
  - Total: 31,482
  - Density: 2,998.29/km^{2} (7,765.5/sq mi)

Languages
  - Official: Kannada
- Time zone: UTC+5:30 (IST)
- PIN: 586 209
- Telephone code: 08359
- ISO 3166 code: IN-KA
- Vehicle registration: KA-28
- Website: www.inditown.mrc.gov.in

Indi is a city in the state of Karnataka, India. It is the taluk headquarters of Indi Taluk, in the district of Vijayapura.

== Geography ==
Indi is located at 17.17°N 75.97°E. It has an average elevation of 465 meters (1525 feet). It is located at the border of Maharashtra, in the neighboring state of Karnataka. The soil at Indi is dry and agriculture is dependent on rainfall. But, with the construction of the Upper Krishna project, most of the agricultural land has been brought under irrigation. The Bhima flows through Indi Taluk, originating at the Bhimashankar Hills in Maharashtra.

== Demographics ==
As of 2001 India census, Indi had a population of 31,483. Males constituted 52% of the population and females 48%. Indi had an average literacy rate of 57%, lower than the national average of 59.5%. The male literacy rate was 65% and the female literacy rate was 48%. In Indi, 15% of the population was under 6 years of age. The most widely spoken language is Kannada.

In 2011, Indi had a population of 38,217.

=== Religion ===
In 2011, Indi's population was 71.99% Hindu and 25.72% Muslim.

== Places of interest ==
The Gramadevata (deity) of Indi is Shanteshwar. A Shanteshwar temple is located in the center of town with a Shiva linga. Pooja (worship) is done three times a day.

A big celebration is held every year and a special Akki Pooja is done. The linga is decorated with several kilograms of wet rice, the specialty being that not a single grain of rice falls down.

Indi also has an old Venkateshwar temple which has a beautiful deity. Shree Ambabhavani Temple is located near the Shanteshwar Temple.

20 kilometers from Indi is the village of Shirashyad, where Shree Murughendra Shivacharya Hiremath Samsthana, a famous saint, once lived. He performed many miracles and, to this day, has a following of thousands.

10 kilometers from Indi is the village of Lachyan, where Siddalinga Maharaja, a famous saint, once lived. He performed many miracles and, to this day, has a following of thousands.

3 kilometers from Indi is a place called Hireindi (Hire meaning elder). It is believed to be older than Indi. According to a legend, Hireindi was visited by the plague, so the new town of Indi was formed, to which all migrated. Hire-Indi has a very old Hanuman temple, alongside a huge farmland maintained by the agriculture department.

Indi also has the Husain Darga. It has graves of Islamic messengers. People of all religions come here for worship and to celebrate the Muharram festival; this is one of the biggest celebrations in Indi.

There is a village called Mannur 23 kilometers from Indi. Mannur has 3 famous temples:

- The Yellamma Devi Temple,
- The Padmavati Jain Mandir and
- The Channa Keshava temple.
- 10kms from Indi is the Hirerugi jatingeswahar Temple

Salotagi a village 8km west of Indi on State Highway 48 has ancient connection to the Rastrakuta dynasty. Many ancient articulates and scriptures were found here (presently placed in golgumbaz museum). A saint named Shivayogeshwara lived and preached here at the temple. It's a religious place and a grand fair is organized every year in the month of April and May.

== Connectivity with other towns ==
Many buses run from Vijayapura, the district headquarters, to Indi. Vijayapura is 60 kilometers from Indi. The other major town, Solapur, in the neighboring state of Maharashtra, is 70 kilometers from Indi. Indi has a railway station 6 kilometers away, that has the trains, Basava Express and Gol Gumbaz Express, connecting Indi to Bangalore. The Bijapur Fast Passenger connects it to Mumbai.

== See also ==
- Ramanagar
- Atharga
- Ballolli
- Chadchan
- Sindagi
- Lachyan
- Naad (K.D.)
- Salotgi
- Muddebihal
