= Araladinni =

- village
- Location in Karnataka, India Araladinni (India)
- Coordinates: 16.59°N 75.96°E
- Country: India
- State: Karnataka
- District: Bijapur
- Talukas: Basavana Bagevadi

Population (2001)
  - Total: 10,363

Languages
  - Official: Kannada
- Time zone: UTC+5:30 (IST)

Araladinni is a village in the southern state of Karnataka, India. It is located in the Basavana Bagevadi taluk of Bijapur district in Karnataka. It is 1 kilometer from Almatti Dam and 5 kilometer from Nidagundi. It has a good road and railway connectivity. National Highway 13 and Almatti Railway Station are less than 5 kilometers distance from Araladinni. Some of the famous places near by are Kudalasangama, Yalagur, Almatti Dam, Basavana Bagevadi.

== Demographics ==
As of 2001 India census, Araladinni had a population of 10363 with 5364 males and 4999 females.

== Geography ==
Araladinni lies in the southern part of Vijayapura District. Its on the bank of Krishna River and has one of the best fertile land. The land has black and red soil and most of the lands are well irrigated. Many of the farmers mainly grow sugar cane, maze, sunflower, wheat, jawar maze and many oil seeds.

== See also ==
- Bijapur
- Districts of Karnataka
- Almatti Dam
- Yalagur
