= Abbihal =

Abbihal may refer to several places in India:

- Abbihal, Belgaum, Karnataka
- Abbihal, Basavana Bagevadi, Bijapur District, Karnataka
- Abbihal, Muddebihal, Bijapur District, Karnataka
