= Agasabal =

Agasabal may refer to:

- Agasabal, Basavana Bagevadi
- Agasabal, Muddebihal
