= Akalwadi =

- village
- Akalwadi is in Bijapur district
- Country: India
- State: Karnataka
- District: Bijapur
- Talukas: Basavana Bagevadi

Government
  - Body: Village Panchayat

Population (2011)
  - Total: 475

Languages
  - Official: Kannada
- Time zone: UTC+5:30 (IST)
- Vehicle registration: KA
- Nearest city: Bijapur
- Civic agency: Village Panchayat
- Website: karnataka.gov.in

Akalwadi is a village in the southern state of Karnataka, India. It is located in the Basavana Bagevadi taluk of Bijapur district in Karnataka.

== See also ==
- Bijapur district
- Districts of Karnataka
