= Kudari Salawadgi =

- village
- Location in Karnataka, India Kudari Salawadgi (India)
- Coordinates: 16.59°N 75.96°E
- Country: India
- State: Karnataka
- District: Bijapur
- Talukas: Basavana Bagevadi

Population (2001)
  - Total: 7,064

Languages
  - Official: Kannada
- Time zone: UTC+5:30 (IST)

Kudari Salawadgi is a village in the southern state of Karnataka, India. It is located in the Basavana Bagevadi taluk of Bijapur district in Karnataka.

== Demographics ==
As of 2001 India census, Kudari Salawadgi had a population of 7064 with 3536 males and 3528 females.

== See also ==
- Bijapur district
- Districts of Karnataka
