= Ingaleshwara =

- village
- Location in Karnataka, India Ingaleshwara (India)
- Coordinates: 16.59°N 75.96°E
- Country: India
- State: Karnataka
- District: Bijapur
- Talukas: Basavana Bagevadi

Population (2001)
  - Total: 6,926

Languages
  - Official: Kannada
- Time zone: UTC+5:30 (IST)

Ingaleshwara is a village in the southern state of Karnataka, India. It is located in the Basavana Bagevadi taluk of Bijapur district in Karnataka. Ingaleshwar is the birthplace of Shri Basaveshwara (Basavanna), the 12th century Saint.

== Demographics ==
As of 2001 India census, Ingaleshwar had a population of 6926 with 3553 males and 3373 females.

== See also ==
- Bijapur district
- Districts of Karnataka
