= Yashwant Sardeshpande =

Indian filmmaker (1963–2025)

- Born: 13 June 1963; Ukkali, Karnataka, India
- Died: 29 September 2025 (aged 62); Bengaluru, Karnataka, India
- Occupations: Filmmaker, actor

Yashwant Sardeshpande (13 June 1963 – 29 September 2025) was an Indian filmmaker and actor in Kannada theatre, television and film. He died from a cardiac arrest in Bengaluru, Karnataka, on 29 September 2025, at the age of 62.

== Theatre ==
- All the Best
- Hingadre.Comedy (2007)

== Film ==
- Jootata (2005)
- Amrithadhare (2005)
- Rama Shama Bhama (2005)
- Dheemaku (2008)
- Gaana Bajaana (2011)
