= Mulawad =

Mulawad Mulawad
- village
- Location in Karnataka, India Mulawad (India)
- Coordinates: 16.59°N 75.96°E
- Country: India
- State: Karnataka
- District: Vijayapura district
- Talukas: Kolhar

Government
  - Member of the Legislative Assembly: Shivanand S Patil
  - Member of Parliament: Ramesh Jigajinagi

Population (2020)
  - Total: 14,000(Approx)

Languages
  - Official: Kannada
- Time zone: UTC+5:30 (IST)
- PIN: 586108
- Telephone code: 08426
- Vehicle registration: KA28
- Nearest city: Vijaypur
- Lok Sabha constituency: Vijaypur
- Vidhan Sabha constituency: B.Bagewadi
- Climate: DRY HOT (Köppen)

Mulawad is a village in the southern state of Karnataka, India. It is located in the Kolhar taluk of Vijayapura district in Karnataka. Mulawad is located near the famous historical city of Basavan Bagewadi.

== Demographics ==
As of 2001 India census, Mulawad had a population of 6383 with 3240 males and 3143 females.

== See also ==
- Bijapur district
- Districts of Karnataka
