= Wandal, Nidagundi =

Wandal
- village
- Location in Karnataka, India Wandal (India)
- Coordinates: 16.414537°N 75.886073°E
- Country: India
- State: Karnataka
- District: Bijapur
- Talukas: Nidagundi
- Elevation: 530 m (1,740 ft)

Population (2011)
  - Total: 7,593

Languages
  - Official: Kannada
- Time zone: UTC+5:30 (IST)
- PIN: 586201
- ISO 3166 code: IN-KA
- Vehicle registration: KA-28
- Website: karnataka.gov.in

Wandal is a village in the southern state of Karnataka, India.

== Overview ==
Wandal is a village and has population of approximately 8,000 (in the year 2011). People speak Kannada, Hindi and English languages fluently. 80% of the people in the village are educated. Each house in the village has at least one teacher or doctors or engineers are common in Wandal village. It is located in the Nidagundi taluk of Bijapur district in Karnataka. It was once recorded that village was having highest number of teachers in Bijapur district.

== History ==
According to local tradition, the name Wandal is believed to have originated from a prominent banyan tree that once stood at the centre of the village. The tree served as a focal point of community life, where villagers gathered for social interactions, community discussions, cultural activities, and village festivities. Owing to its significance in the daily lives of the people, the settlement gradually came to be known as Wandal.

Wandal is also home to the historic Shri Banashankari Temple, a revered place of worship believed to be more than 150 years old. The temple has played a central role in the religious, cultural, and social life of the village for generations and continues to be an important spiritual landmark for devotees from the surrounding region.

The village is renowned for the annual Banashankari Jatra, one of the most prominent religious and cultural festivals in the area. The jatra is traditionally celebrated every year in January and continues for five days following Banada Hunnime. The festivities feature several traditional events, including Rathotsava (chariot festival), Dyamavvana Soga, Basavanna Pratishthapane, and Jangi Kusti (traditional wrestling competitions).

The festival attracts devotees and visitors not only from Wandal but also from nearly 15 to 20 surrounding villages, making it an important regional gathering. The Banashankari Jatra serves as a vibrant celebration of faith, culture, and community spirit, while helping preserve the rich traditions and heritage of the village. ``

== Demographics ==
As of 2011 India census, Wandal had a population of 6,730 with 2,882 males and 2,848 females. Wandal is in Nidagundi Taluka. The village is situated along Bijapur–Bangalore National Highway No.50 at a distance of 54 kilometres (34 mi) from Bijapur, and 487 kilometres (303 mi) distance from the state capital of Bangalore.

== Culture ==
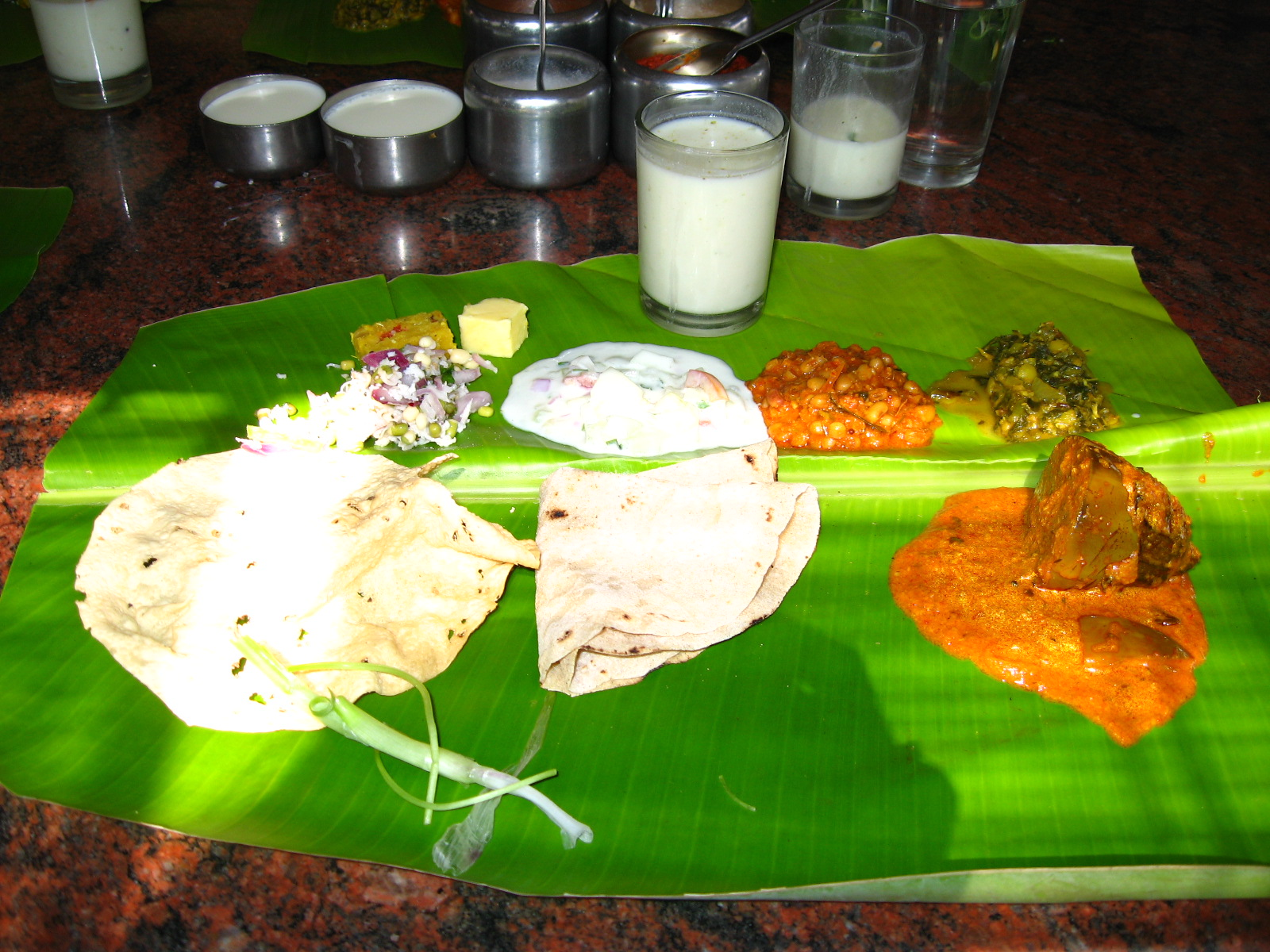
North Karnataka Food

Wandal culture includes genuine North Karnataka style art. Men wear dhothra, Nehru shirts, and silk rumalu (Pakata). Women wear Ilkal saree and Khadi clothes in previous decades. Now, it is all modern styles brought up from cities to villages.

== Cuisine ==
In the village, wheat and jowar rottis (unleavened bread made with millet) are popular.

The following are typical items in a vegetarian meal:

- Rotti/Bhakri, Rice, Saaru, Happala and Kosambari
- Shenga/Ellu – Dry chutney in powder form, sometimes called Hindi (chutney)

== Temples ==
The village has several temples

- Shree Banashankari Temple- The Village Goddess
- Shree Durga Devi Temple
- Shree Mallikarjuna Temple
- Shree Basaveshwara Temple
- Shree Venkateswara Temple
- Shree Hanuman Temple
- Shree Beeralingeshwara Temple
- Shree Lakshmi Devi Temple

== Education ==
In 2011, literacy rate of Wandal village is 75.36% of Karnataka. In Wandal, male literacy stands at 86.67% while female literacy rate was 63.76%.

College/schools near Wandal:

- Shree Shakhambari High School
- KBHPS Wandal
- Unaided Sri Maruti High School Wandal R S
- Lower primary Urdu school
- Bhagyavanti Lower Primary School
- Sri Jagajyothi Basaveswara Public School Wandal

== Infrastructure ==
=== Healthcare ===
Wandal has a Primary Health Centre (PHC) that provides primary healthcare services to the village and surrounding areas.

=== Transport ===
Wandal is served by Wandal railway station, providing rail connectivity to the region.

Trains to Wandal:

- Golgumbaz Express
- Basava Express
- Dharwad -Solapur passenger

== See also ==
- Almatti Dam
- Bijapur district
- Districts of Karnataka
- Kudalasangama
- Nidagundi
