= Tangadagi =

Tangadagi Tangadgi
- Village
- Location within Karnataka Location within India
- Coordinates: 16°12′54″N 76°5′39″E
- Country: India
- State: Karnataka
- District: Bijapur district
- Taluk: Muddebihal

Government
  - Body: Gram panchayat

Languages
  - Official: Kannada
- Time zone: UTC+5:30 (IST)
- PIN: 586129
- Telephone code: 08356
- ISO 3166 code: IN-KA
- Vehicle registration: KA-28
- Website: karnataka.gov.in

Tangadagi is a village in the Muddebihal taluk of Bijapur district in Karnataka state, India.

== Demographics ==
Per the 2011 Census of India, Tangadagi has a total population of 3162; of whom 1549 are male and 1613 female.

== See also ==
- Gulbarga
- Jewargi
- Kudalasangama
- Muddebihal
- Bagalkot
