= Managuli =

- village
- Location in Karnataka, India Managuli (India)
- Coordinates: 16.65°N 75.81°E
- Country: India
- State: Karnataka
- District: Bijapur
- Talukas: Basavana Bagevadi

Population (2001)
  - Total: 14,306

Languages
  - Official: Kannada
- Time zone: UTC+5:30 (IST)
- Postal code: 586122
- Vehicle registration: ka-28

Managuli , sometimes also called Managoli and Managoli is a village in the southern state of Karnataka, India. It is located in the Basavana Bagevadi taluk of Bijapur district in Karnataka.

== Demographics ==
As of 2014 India census, Managuli had a population of 34,306 with 17,236 males and 17,070 females. It is known for growing jower. Recently, Managoli listed as Pattana Panchayath.

== See also ==
- Bijapur district
- Districts of Karnataka
