= Abbihal, Basavana Bagevadi =

Abbihal
- village
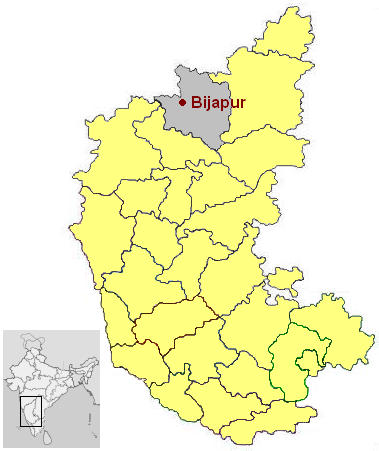
- Abbihal (Basavana Bagevadi) is in Bijapur district
- Interactive map of Abbihal
- Coordinates: 16.4056°N 75.9143°E
- Country: India
- State: Karnataka
- District: Bijapur
- Talukas: Basavana Bagevadi

Government
  - Body: Village Panchayat

Languages
  - Official: Kannada
- Time zone: UTC+5:30 (IST)
- Nearest city: Bijapur, Karnataka
- Civic agency: Village Panchayat

Abbihal (Basavana Bagevadi) is a village in the southern state of Karnataka, India. It is located in the Basavana Bagevadi taluk of Bijapur district in Karnataka.

== See also ==
- Districts of Karnataka
