= Yalagur =

- village
- Location in Karnataka, India Yalagur (India)
- Coordinates: 16.329095°N 75.925948°E
- Country: India
- State: Karnataka
- District: Bijapur
- Talukas: Nidagundi

Languages
  - Official: Kannada
- Time zone: UTC+5:30 (IST)
- Postal code: 586213
- Website: www.shriyalguresh.com

Yalagur is a small village in Nidagundi taluk, Vijayapur District of southern state of Karnataka. its 4 kilometers from Nidagundi and 5 kilometers from Almatti Dam. You can reach this place from Nidagundi by either bus or auto rikshaw.

This is one of the holy place in Vijayapur District because of famous Hanuman temple called Yalagureshwar temple. It's the only Hanuman temple for the surrounding 7 villages and all the village people worship of lord Hanuman.

== History ==
History of the Yalagur goes back to the time of Vasistha Ramayana and Shri Yalguresh stands in the village of Yalgur on the order of Shri Rama for seven villages(Elu Uresh == Yalguresh).

The idol of Shri Hanuman was found in the Govindraj Kere(Lake); (Now called as Gondi Kere). In the vicinity there is Adkal Gudi in the North-west of the Gondi Kere where Shri Lord Venkatesh's 'Sannidhana' is located and now the idols of Shri Venkateshwar and Padmavati is placed and small temple has built in the middle of the big stone because of the fear by Muslim kings of Bijapur. After the fall of Bijapur Kingdom one night one pujari (a Hindu priest) had a dream; who was performing puja on the stone where idol of shri Hanuman was hidden; to break the stone and get the idol; as the pujari was breaking the stone irregularly, the idol was also broken into pieces. . The pujari was worried about the pieces and the puja to be performed and again he had a dream in the night and he was ordered to bring the pieces to the place (where now we have the Temple) and place them in a proper manner and close the door for seven complete days, but pujari being very anxious to see the idol and could not suppress the anxiety, he opened the door on the seventh day morning; he saw the idol was completely joined in the upper part of the idol and few pieces are not joined completely in lower part of the idol (even now we can see the unjoined parts). After that again the pujari had a dream and he was ordered by God to perform all form of poojas from learned Brahmins bringing sacred waters from river Krishna and perform Abhisheka and perform Pratishthapana. So he did all the things as ordered by the God. And now the god is in full strength to bless the devotees. Even today everyday the pujari brings the holy waters from Krishan river and performs Abhishek.

After that in the rule of maratha king Shri Baaji Rao 480 acres of land was given to the temple as jahagir and was distributed to the pujari and other servants to perform poojas and all other sevas everyday without fail.

== Hymns ==
- "Manojavam Maruttulyavegam"
- "Jeetendriayam Buddhimattam Varistham"
- "Vatatmajam Vaanaryuth Mukham"
- "Shree Rama Dootam Sharnam Prapadye."

== Geography ==
Yalgur is on the bank of Krishna River and it is just a kilometre away from the river. It has a fertile land and mainly its black soil which is well suited to leguminous crops like cotton and Other crops include wheat, jowar, millets, linseed, sugarcane, sunflower, vegetables and many oil seeds.

== Mythologies ==
In 1900 Shri Yalguresh gave darshana to Shri Pandurangi Huchachari. In 1901 he went to Tirupathi and wrote bhaktigeet.

1 In Chimmalgi village, Krishna Bhattara of Siddhanti family came to yalgur every Saturday walking. Krishnacharya of Purohit family of the same village was his friend. Both came to yalgur every Saturday bathed in river, did puja, took angara and then went to home. Later on after some years is the same way when they were coming home weary, tired and aged they slept below a tree to have rest when they had a dream in which Shri Yalguresh said "You have become aged and old so where you are sleeping below Your head there is my murti take it and do its stapana and perform its puja" to Purohit. In the same way Sidhhanti also has the dream" You draw my photo on the wall and perform puja." They both wake up find the murti below the ground. Purohit took it home, did the stapana and performed its puja. Siddhanti Krishna draws a statue in home and performed its puja. Even today we can find the murti in Purohit's house and the drawing on Siddhanti's wall.

2 . In Ballall village there was a devotee named Deasi.. He had no children. So he performed Naivedya, Anna dana etc.. He was very rich. and had three wives. They all performed seva in Yalgur. One day Achari has a dream in which Shri Yalgurdappa says that if the first wife of Desai baths in river and performs Abhiskekha she will have a children. Thinking that the lady is too old she will not be able to that Achari does not tell this to Desai. After three years seeing the devotion and seva performed by Desai and his wives he tells Desai about the dream. Desai's first wife agrees to do accordingly. She bathes in the river bring water from the river and performs Abhishka. After Abhisheka and Annugrah are performed in her dreams Shri Yalguresh gives her MantrAkshati. I the dreams of second wife ShriYalguresh gives her two Uttathi(dry dates) saying that she will have two male children third wife gets 1 Uttathi(dry dates) for 1 boy child. They have children and their wishes are fulfilled

3 During British rule taxes were taken from people who performed seva in temples. So people who performed seva in Yalgur were also asked to pay taxes. People were poor, they had no crop. So the officers punished them and even beat them. There was a devotee named Daseya. People said if he gave they all would pay the officers. Daseya said "I do not have any money, I wont give." The officers beat him so much that he dies. And his sevak has a dream in which God says that" keep him for three days like that only ". After 3 days daseya livens up and he starts performing seva and pujas as daily. Seeing this miracle officers are afraid and say that they wont take any taxes.

== See also ==
- Almatti Dam
- Nidagundi
