= Muttagi =

- village
- Location in Karnataka, India Muttagi (India)
- Coordinates: 16.59°N 75.96°E
- Country: India
- State: Karnataka
- District: Bijapur
- Talukas: Basavana Bagevadi

Government
  - Type: Panchayat raj
  - Body: Gram panchayat

Population (2001)
  - Total: 5,043

Languages
  - Official: Kannada
- Time zone: UTC+5:30 (IST)
- ISO 3166 code: IN-KA
- Vehicle registration: KA
- Website: karnataka.gov.in

Muttagi is a village in the northern state of Karnataka, India. It is located in the Basavana Bagevadi taluk of Bijapur district in Karnataka.

== Demographics ==
As of 2001 India census, Muttagi had a population of 5043 with 2542 males and 2501 females.

== See also ==
- Districts of Karnataka
