= Ingaleshwar =

- village
- Location in Karnataka, India Ingaleshwar (India)
- Coordinates: 16.59°N 75.96°E
- Country: India
- State: Karnataka
- District: Bijapur
- Talukas: Basavana Bagevadi

Population (2001)
  - Total: 6,926

Languages
  - Official: Kannada
- Time zone: UTC+5:30 (IST)

Ingaleshwar is a village in the southern state of Karnataka, India. It is located in the Basavana Bagevadi taluk of Bijapur district in Karnataka. Ingaleshwar is the birthplace of Shri Basaveshwara (Basavanna), the 12th century Saint.

this village belongs Basavana Bagewadi Taluk of Bijapur (Vijayapura) district, which is situated 10 km away from its Taluk Basavana Bagewadi. According to historians Basavannas mother's place is Ingaleshwar and fathers place is Bagewadi. When the mother was pregnant carrying Basavanna came to her place for delivery. So officially the birthplace of Basavanna is Ingleshwar, then after few years he moved to Bagewadi along with his mother.

== Demographics ==
As of 2001 India census, Ingaleshwar had a population of 6926 with 3553 males and 3373 females.

== See also ==
- Bijapur district
- Districts of Karnataka
