= Abbihal, Belgaum =

Abbihal
- Village
- Location in Karnataka, India Abbihal (India)
- Coordinates: 16.786630°N 75.0345700°E
- Country: India
- State: Karnataka
- District: Belgaum
- Talukas: Athni

Government
  - Body: Village Panchayat

Languages
  - Official: Kannada
- Time zone: UTC+5:30 (IST)
- Nearest city: Belgaum
- Civic agency: Village Panchayat

Abbihal is a village in the southern state of Karnataka, India. It is located in the Athni taluk of Belgaum district in Karnataka.

== See also ==
- Belgaum
- Districts of Karnataka
