= Chimmalagi =

- village
- Interactive map of Chimmalagi
- Coordinates: 16.38°N 75.85°E
- Country: India
- State: Karnataka
- District: Bijapur District

Government
  - Type: Panchayat raj
  - Body: Gram panchayat

Population
  - Total: 3,907

Languages
  - Official: Kannada
- Time zone: UTC+5:30 (IST)
- Postal Code: 586201
- ISO 3166 code: IN-KA
- Vehicle registration: KA
- Website: karnataka.gov.in

Chimmalagi is a village in Vijayapura district, Karnataka state, India. When Almatti dam was built across the Krishna River became fully functional, the village submerged in its backwaters. Government has rehabilitated the original residents of the village to a new place in the same district (Vijayapura). Now the place is called New Chimmalagi.

Most of the inhabitants of this village are found to be devotees of Lord Anjaneya, due to its geographical closeness to Yalgur. Yalgur houses are one of the very famous Hanuman temples in the region.

Most of the original residents of the village carry their last name as Chimmalagi. The educated among them have migrated to places like Hubli, Dharwad, Pune, Bombay, Gulbarga and to Bangalore for better prospects.

Chimmalagi Village was known for its age old Ram Temple (Vanavasi Ram Mandir) which was built by Kolhapur King, now it is shifted with in New Chimmalagi Village worshipped and managed by the Chimmalagi (Gudi) family, head of the family is Vasantacharya Chimmalagi.
