= Abbihal, Muddebihal =

Abbihal
- village
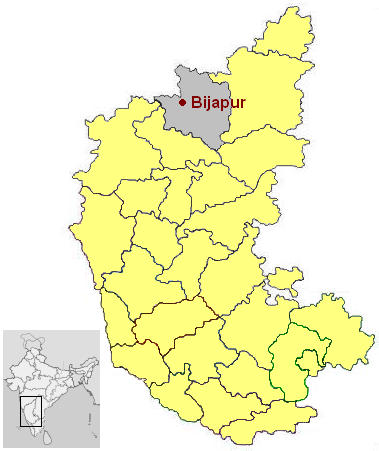
- Abbihal (Muddebihal) is in Bijapur district
- Interactive map of Abbihal
- Coordinates: 16.3553°N 76.1876°E
- Country: India
- State: Karnataka
- District: Bijapur
- Talukas: Muddebihal

Government
  - Type: Panchayat raj
  - Body: Village Panchayat

Languages
  - Official: Kannada
- Time zone: UTC+5:30 (IST)
- ISO 3166 code: IN-KA
- Vehicle registration: KA
- Nearest city: Bijapur, Karnataka
- Civic agency: Village Panchayat
- Website: karnataka.gov.in

Abbihal (Muddebihal) is a village in the southern state of Karnataka, India. It is located in the Muddebihal taluk of Bijapur district in Karnataka.

== See also ==
- Districts of Karnataka
