= Ukkali =

- village
- Location in Karnataka, India Ukkali (India)
- Coordinates: 16.59°N 75.96°E
- Country: India
- State: Karnataka
- District: Bijapur
- Talukas: Basavana Bagevadi

Population (2001)
  - Total: 7,707

Languages
  - Official: Kannada
- Time zone: UTC+5:30 (IST)

Ukkali is a village in the southern state of Karnataka, India. It is located in the Basavana Bagevadi taluk of Vijayapura district (formerly Bijapur district) in Karnataka.

== Demographics ==
As of 2001 India census, Ukkali had a population of 7707 with 3940 males and 3767 females.

== See also ==
- Bijapur district
- Districts of Karnataka
