= Kudalasangama =

Kudalasangama Sangama
- Temple town
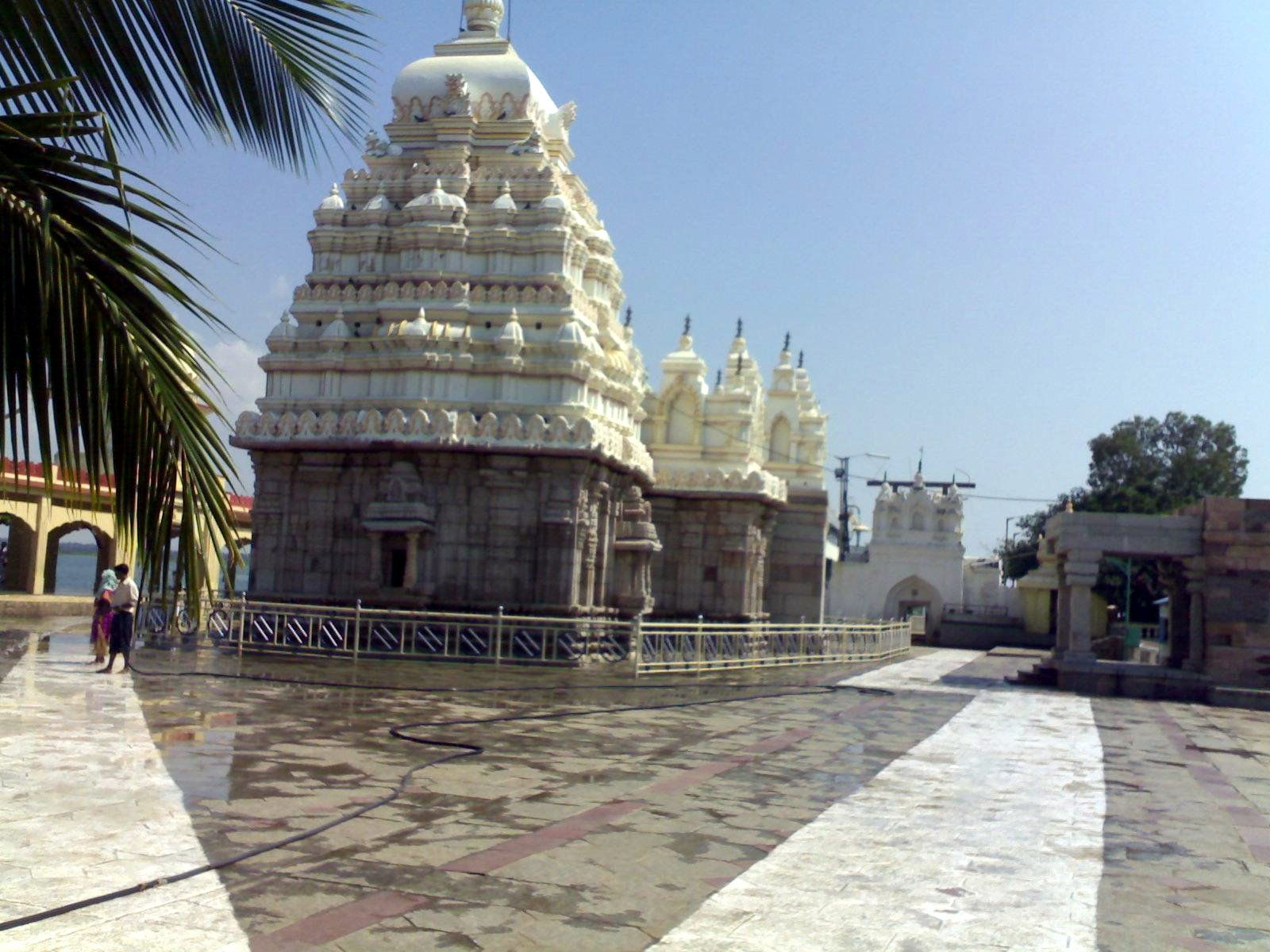
- Sangamanatha temple at Kudalasangama, North Karnataka

- Location within Karnataka
- Coordinates: 16°12′13″N 76°3′36″E
- Country: India
- State: Karnataka
- District: Bagalkote district

Languages
  - Official: Kannada
- Time zone: UTC+5:30 (IST)
- Telephone code: 587115
- Website: www.bagalkot.nic.in/koodal.htm

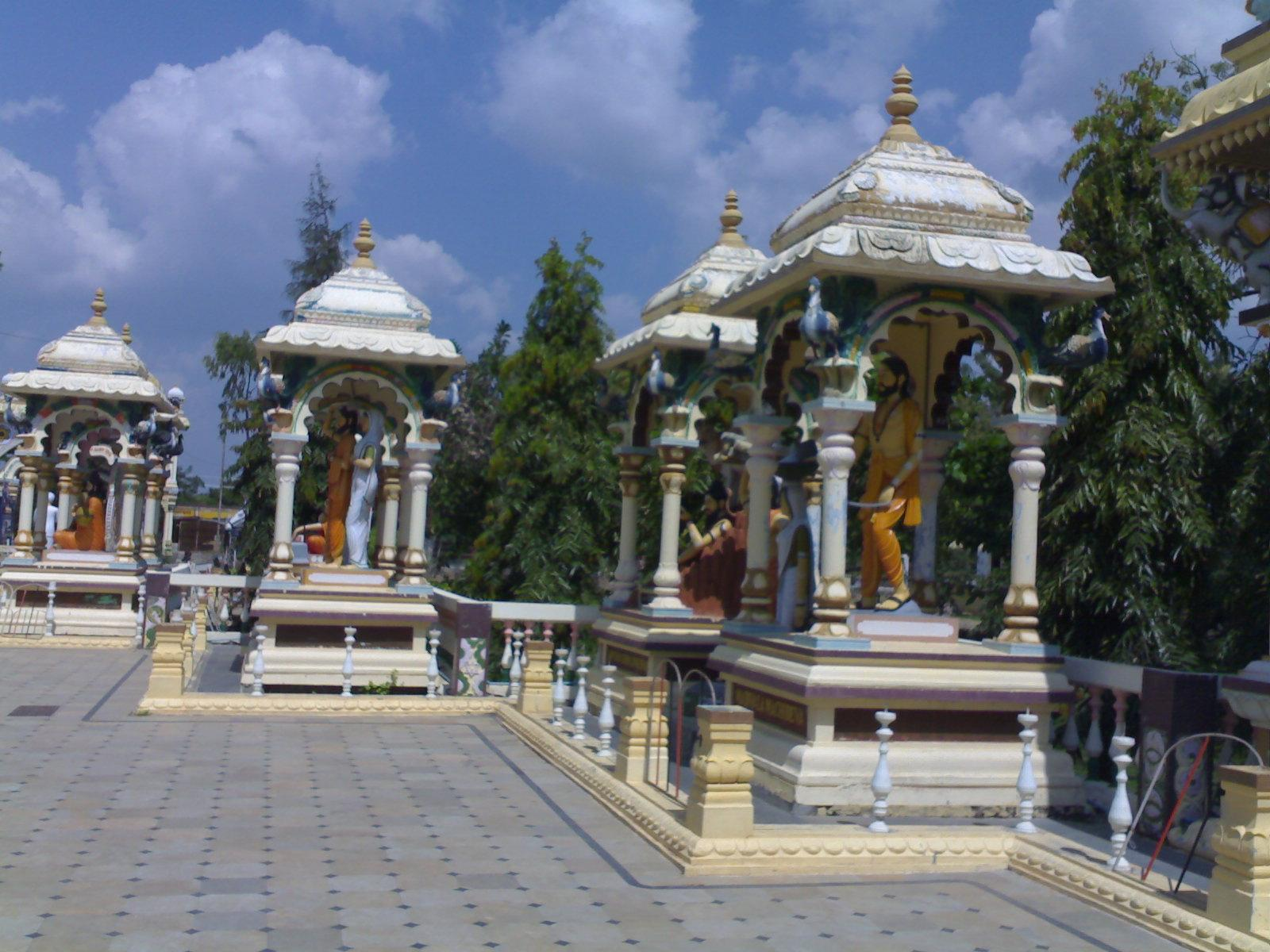
Kudalasangama, North Karnataka

Kudalasangama (also written as Kudala Sangama) in India is an important centre of pilgrimage for Lingayats, a religious denomination of Hinduism. It is located about 15 kilometres (9.3 mi) from the Almatti Dam in Bagalkote district of Karnataka state. The Krishna River and Malaprabha river merge here and flow east towards Srisailam (another pilgrim center) in Andhra Pradesh. The Aikya Mantapa or the holy Samādhi of Basavanna, the founder of the Lingayatism along with Linga, which is believed to be self-born (Swayambhu), is here. The Kudala Sangama Development Board takes care of the maintenance and development.

== Tourism ==
The main attractions in and around Kudala Sangama are:

- The Sangamanatha Temple in Chalukya style
- The Aikya Linga of Basaveshwara
- The Mahamane Campus of the Basava Dharma Peetha
- The Poojavana, a mini forest with neat paths amidst the trees.
- The Sabha Bhavana. Colossal, it is a spacious auditorium with a seating capacity for 6,000. The exquisite doorways on the four sides - named after Gangambike, Nilambike, Channabasavanna and Akka Nagamma - surround the huge grey dome in the centre.
- The Basava Gopura. Tall, it is slated to house the Basava International Centre. The 200 feet (61 m) high symmetrical tower is imposing.
- Museum. The Ashrama, meant for visitors to stay, also has a museum with a collection of sculptures related to Basavanna and the history of Karnataka state.

== History ==
An inscription in the temple of AD 1213 records a gift to the god Acheshvara. Another stone record of AD 1160 refers to land grant to deities, Kaleshvara and Achesvara.

It is believed that in the 12th century Jathaveda Muni Sarangamath had set up an education centre here and Basaveshvara, Channabasavanna and Akkanagamma were students. Basaveshvara spent his boyhood here and, after his return from Kalyana, he is said to have become one with the God at this place. The vachanas composed by him are dedicated to the presiding deity here, Sangamanatha.

== Location and architecture ==
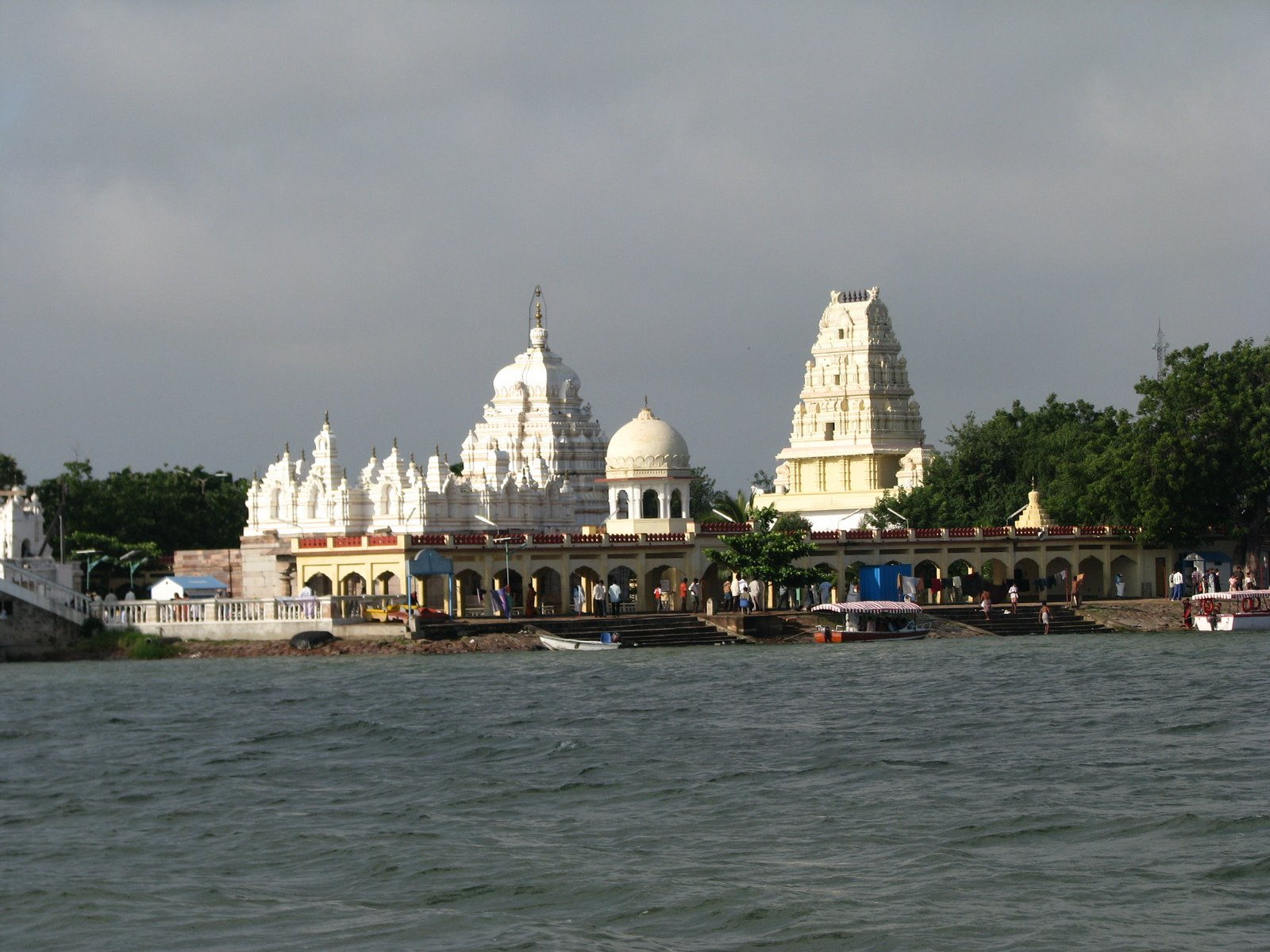
Kudala sangama in Bagalkote district, where Guru Basavanna's samadhi is located.

The place is a village about 19 kilometres (12 mi) from Hungund. Close by is the holy pilgrim centre and the renowned temple of Sangameshwara, on the riverbank, at the confluence of the Krishna and the Malaprabha rivers. Formerly it was known as Kappadi sangama where Basaveshwara’s teacher Ishanaguru lived.

The temple consists of a porch, navaranga and the main shrine. The idols of Basaveshvara, Neelamma, Nandi and Ganapathi have been placed in the navaranga. The door frame of the garbhagriha is richly carved with floral designs and animal figures. In the shrine is the linga famed as Sangameshvara or Sangamanatha.

In front of the temple, in the midst of the river, is a small stone mantapa with a Shivalinga in it, and lofty cement concrete dry well has been built around it to protect it from submersion.

On the east, across the river Krishna, stands the Neelamma’s temple. She was the consort of Basaveshvara. Here also a high cement concrete dry well has been built around the structure to protect it from the waters.

== Vishwaguru Basavanna ==
Iykya linga seen from above.

Vishwaguru ('universal teacher') Basavanna is the famous Philosopher and social reformer who was born in Basavana Bagewadi, a small village in Bijapur District, in North Karnataka, also called Ingaleshwara Bagewadi. Agrahara was an important place in town. The house of Madiraja the chief of the township was situated here. Basaveshwara was born to Madiraja and Madambike on third day of Vyshakha month of Anandanama year in Rohini star, according to the Indian calendar also known as Panchanga(the year coincides with AD 1134). Basavanna was a great saint; he is considered Guru by his followers . A true visionary of his time and a revolutionary who started Lingayat sect. Basavanna's ultimate aim was to make this fundamental right available to each and everyone. Basavanna, keeping welfare as the ultimate aim, expedited programmes to take religion to the people by preaching and writing religious literature in Kannada. His Gadduge (samadhi)is at Kudalasangama.

== See also ==
- Vachana Sahitya

== Photos of Kudala Sangama ==
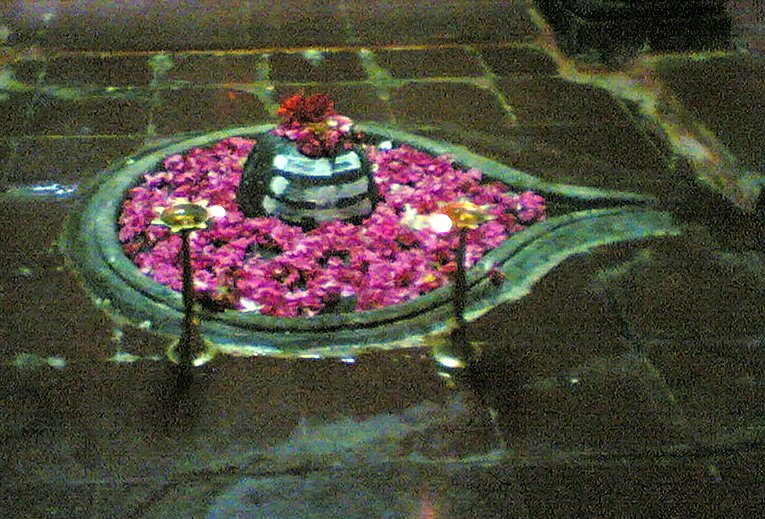

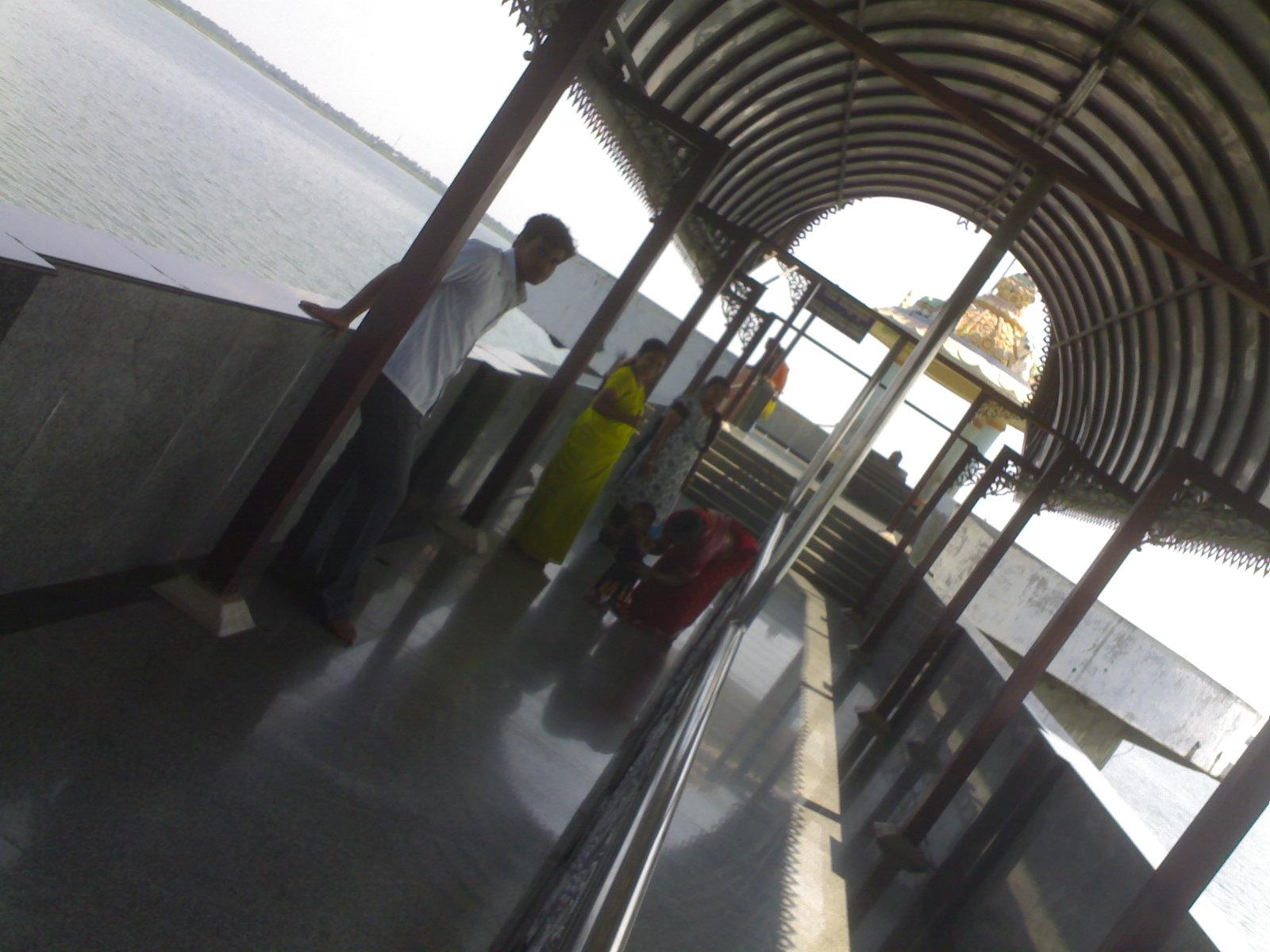

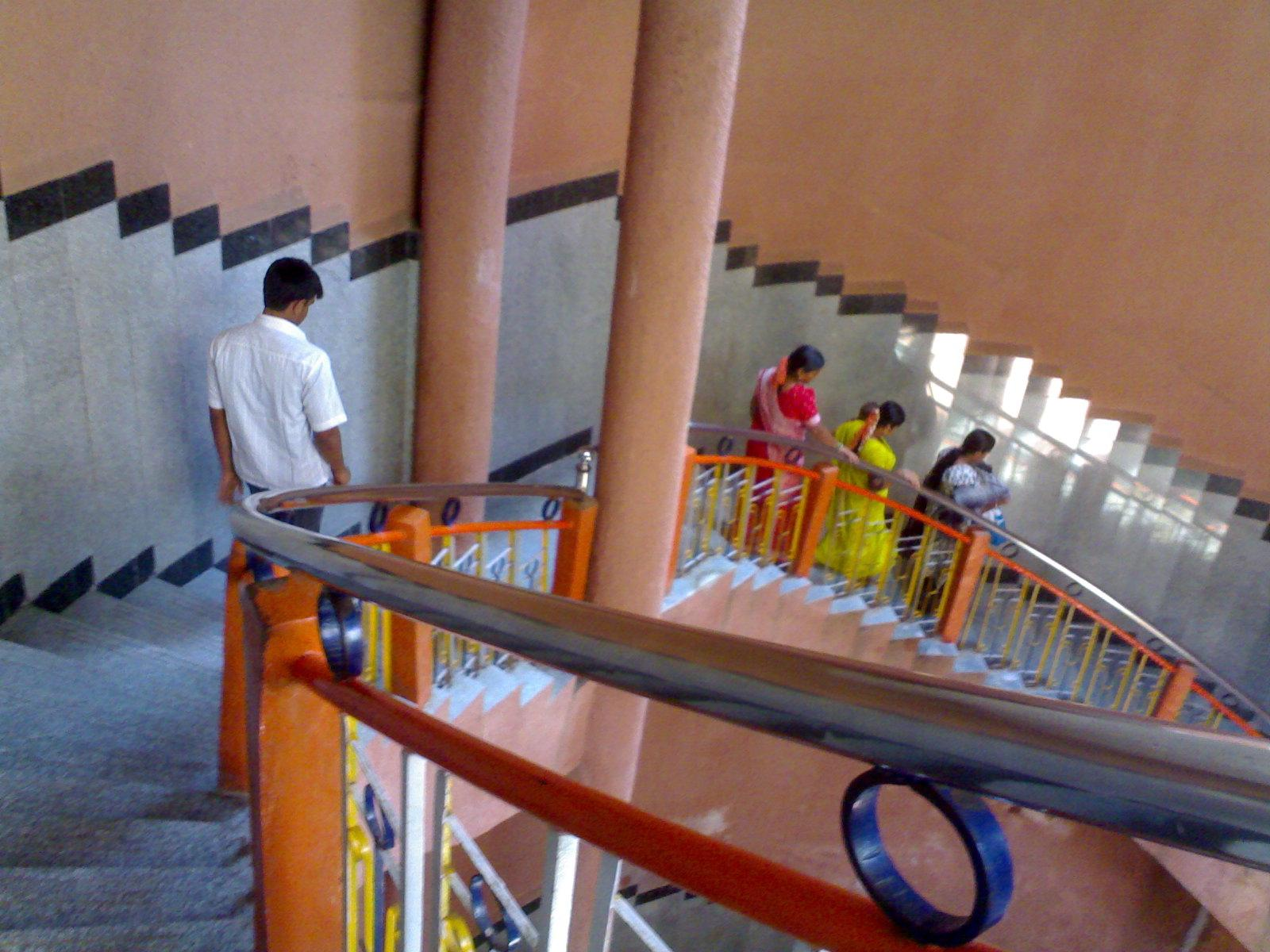

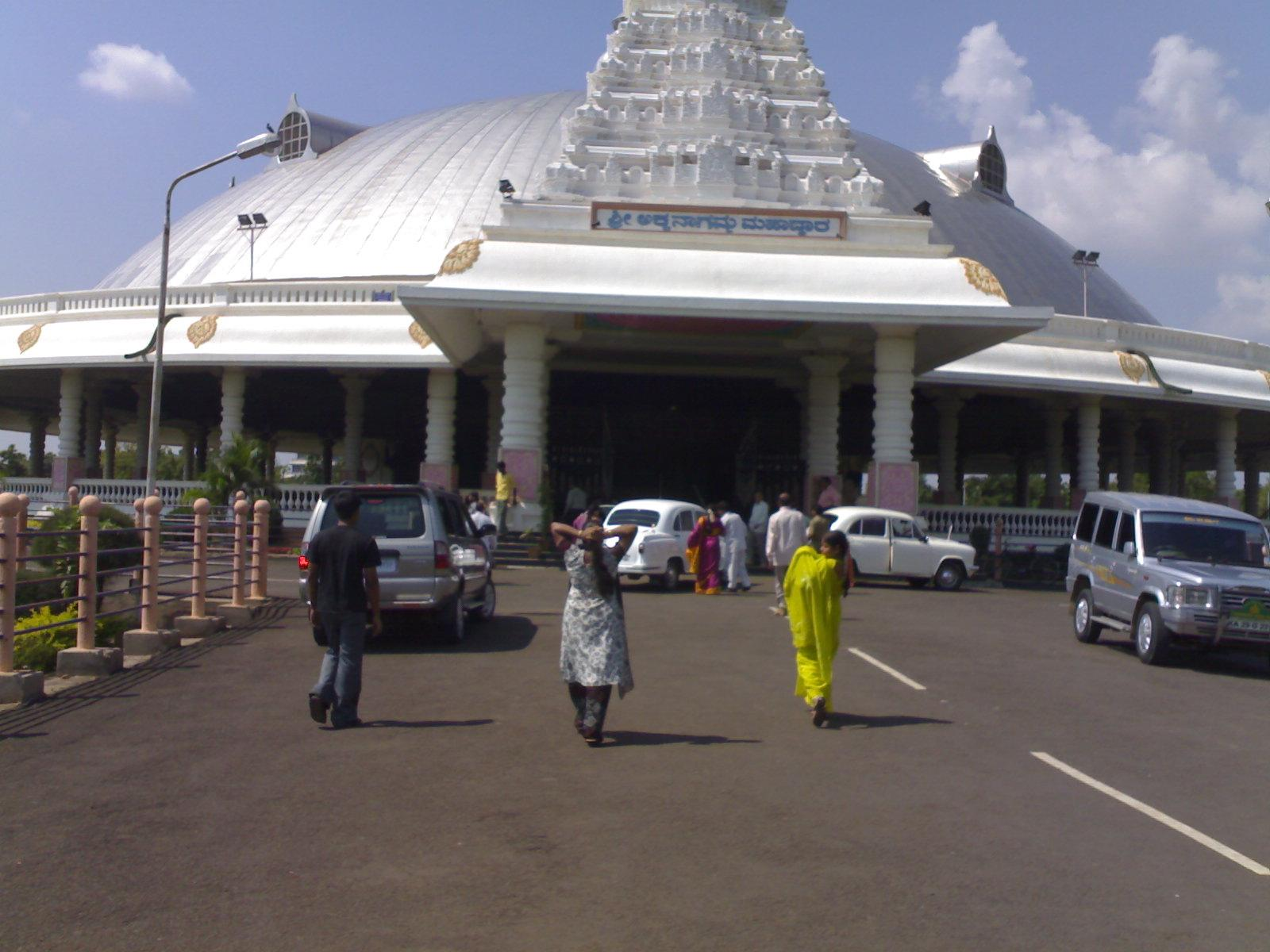

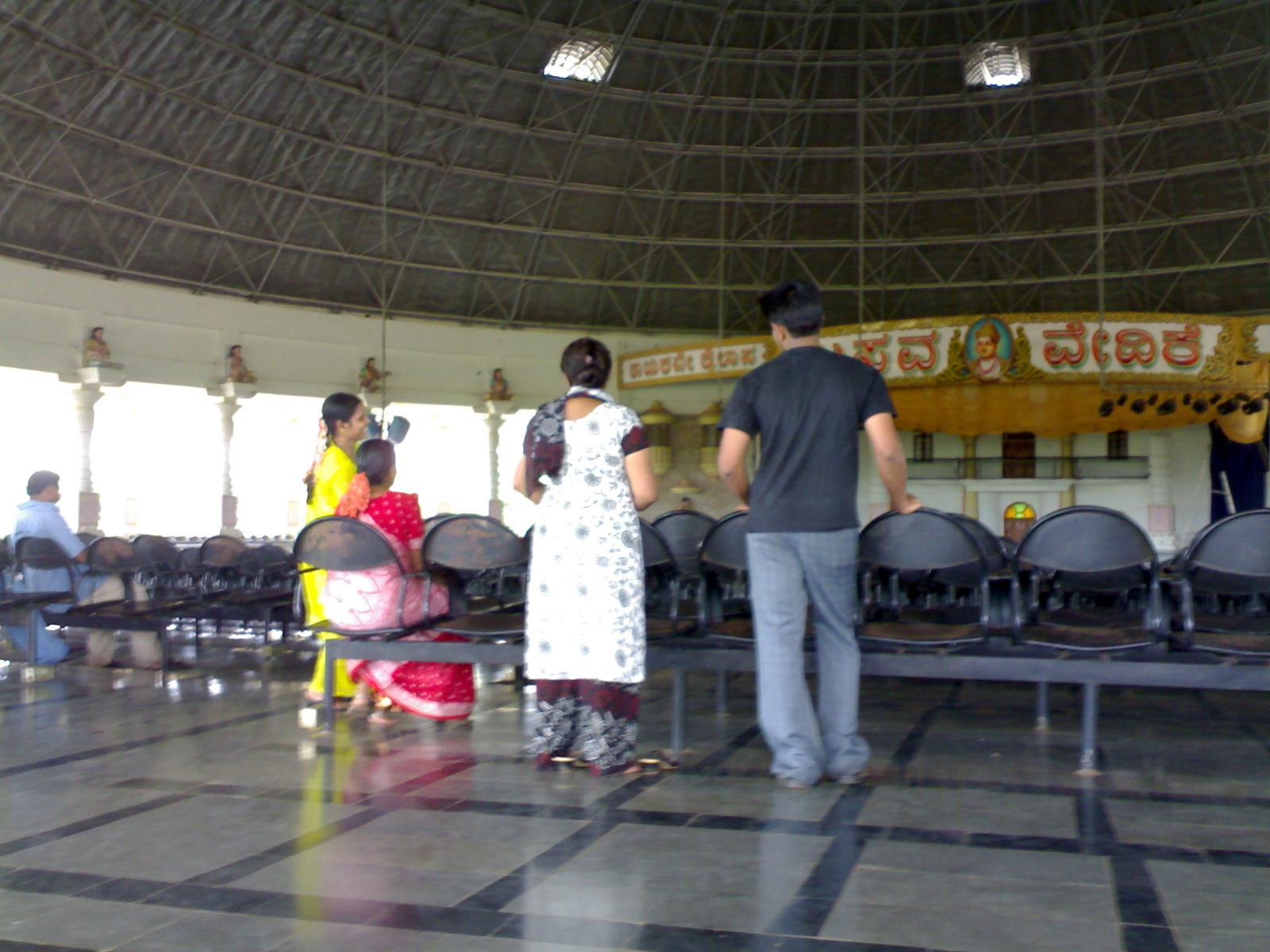

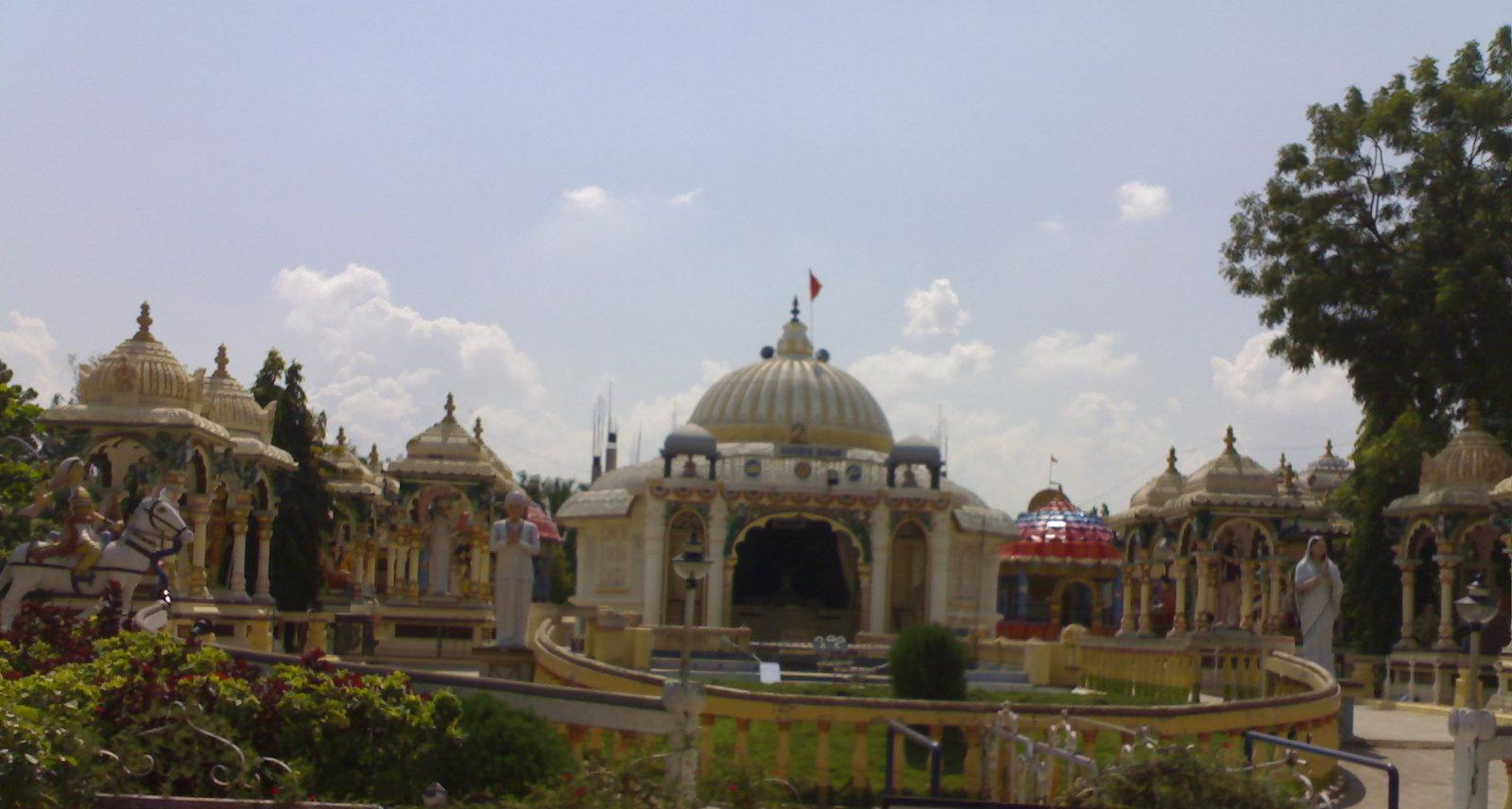

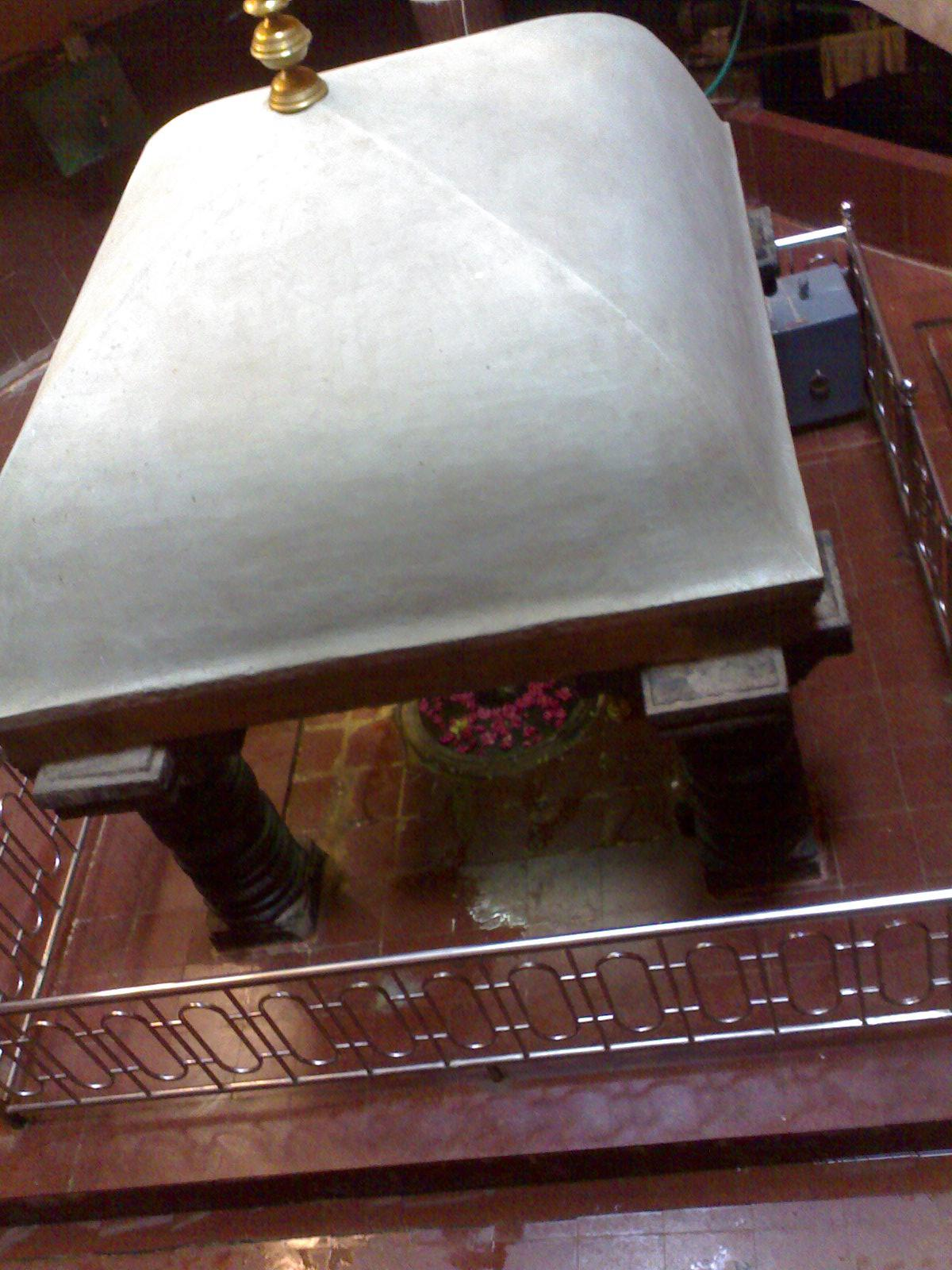

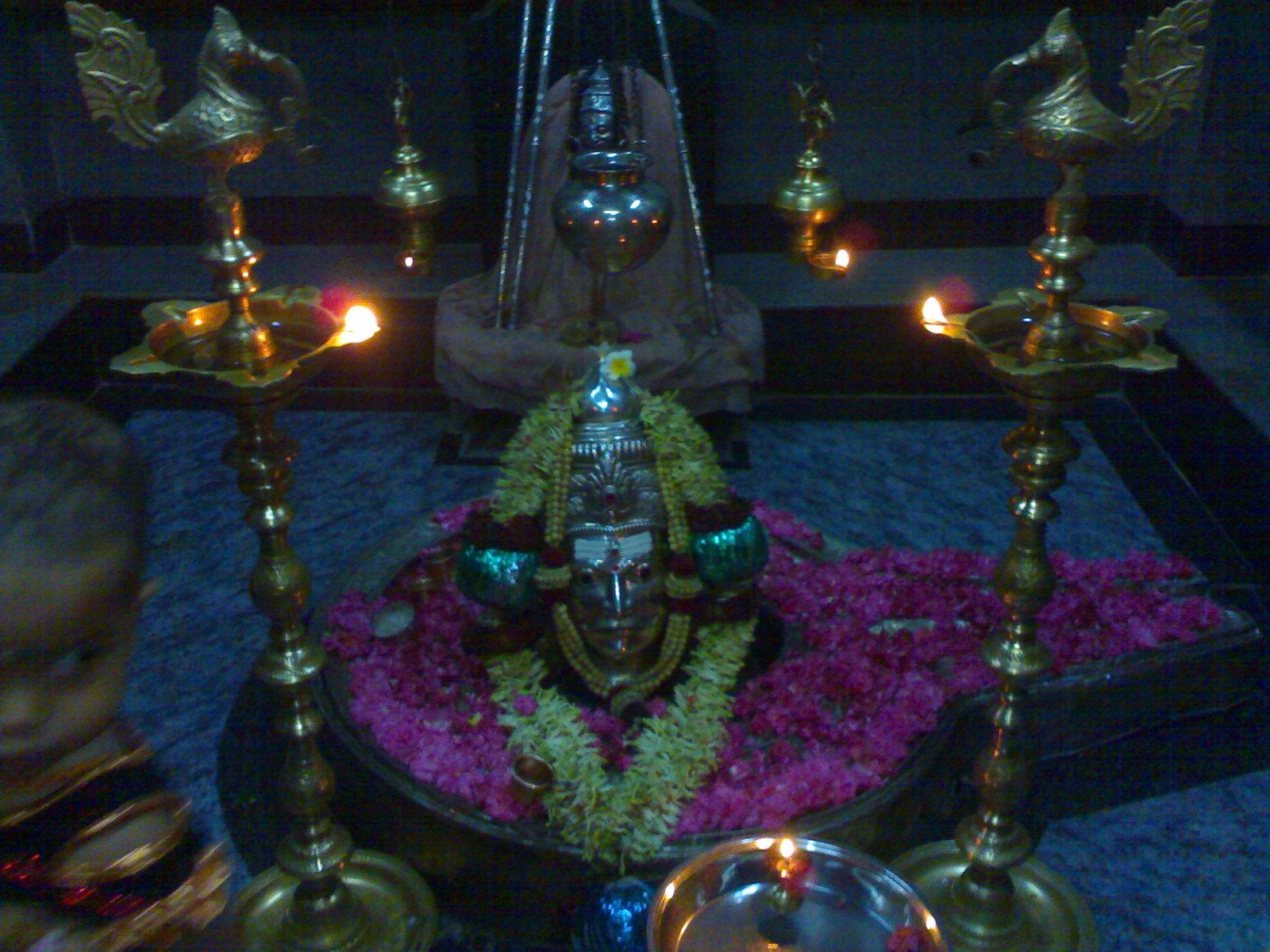

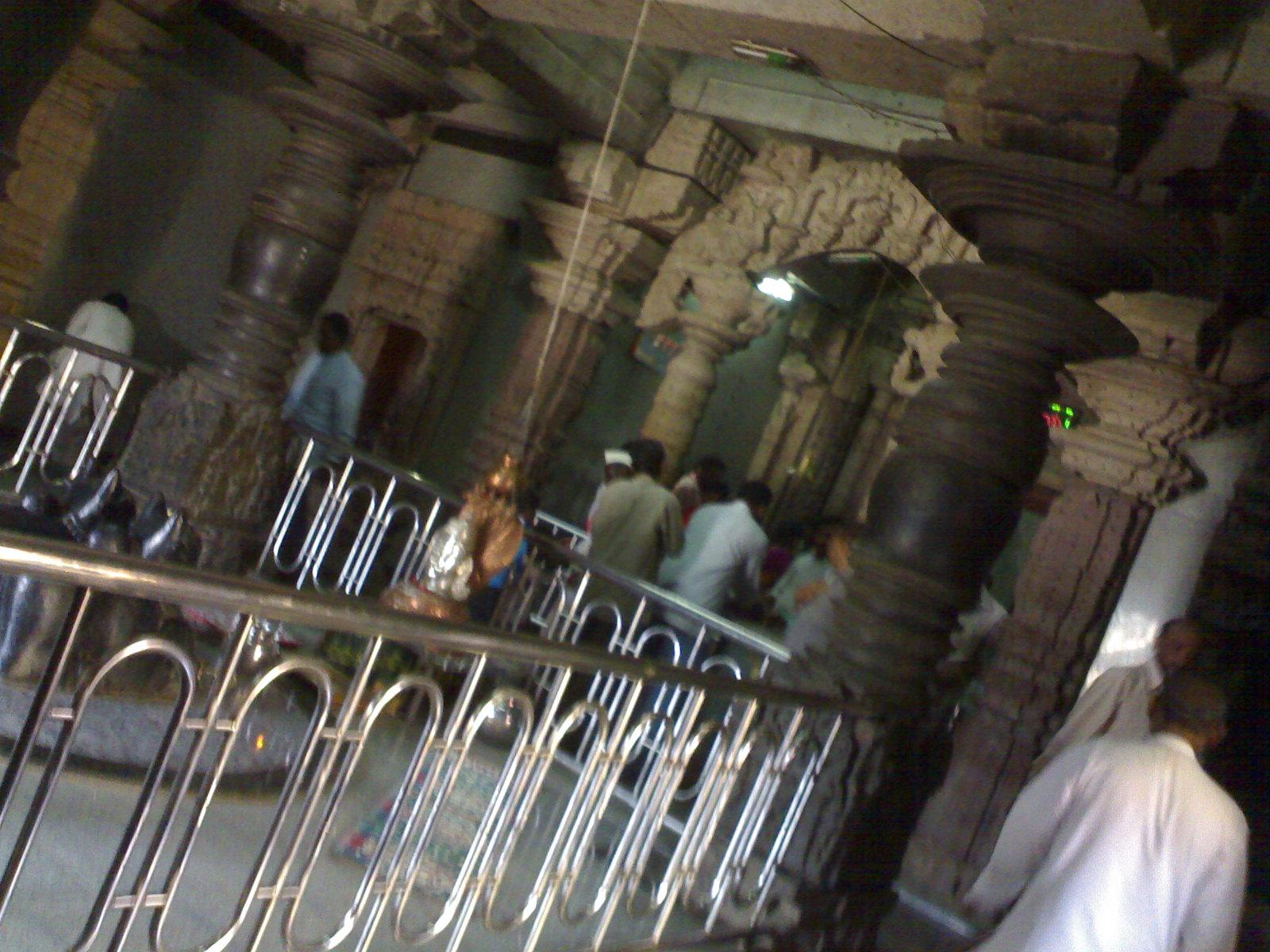

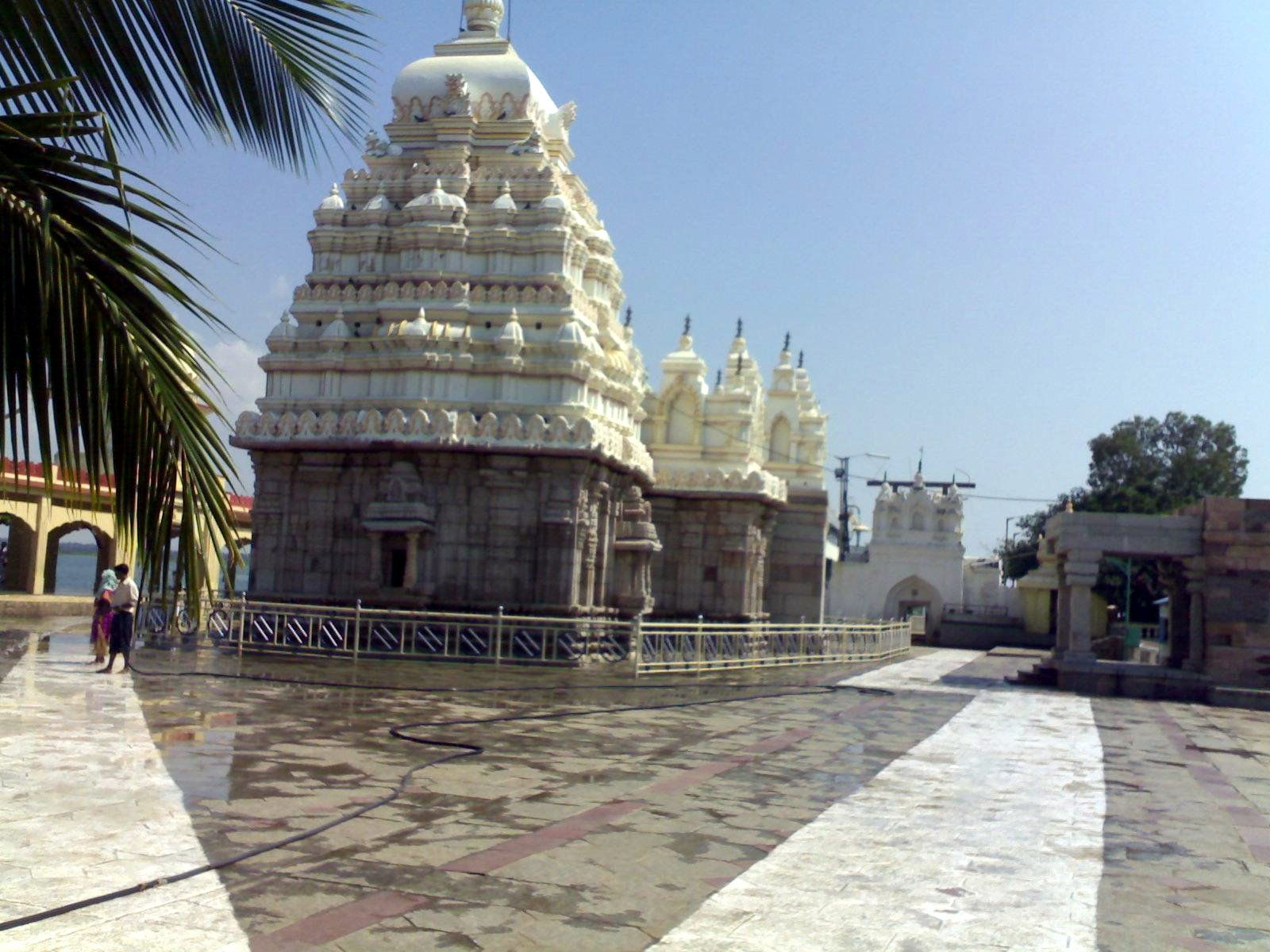

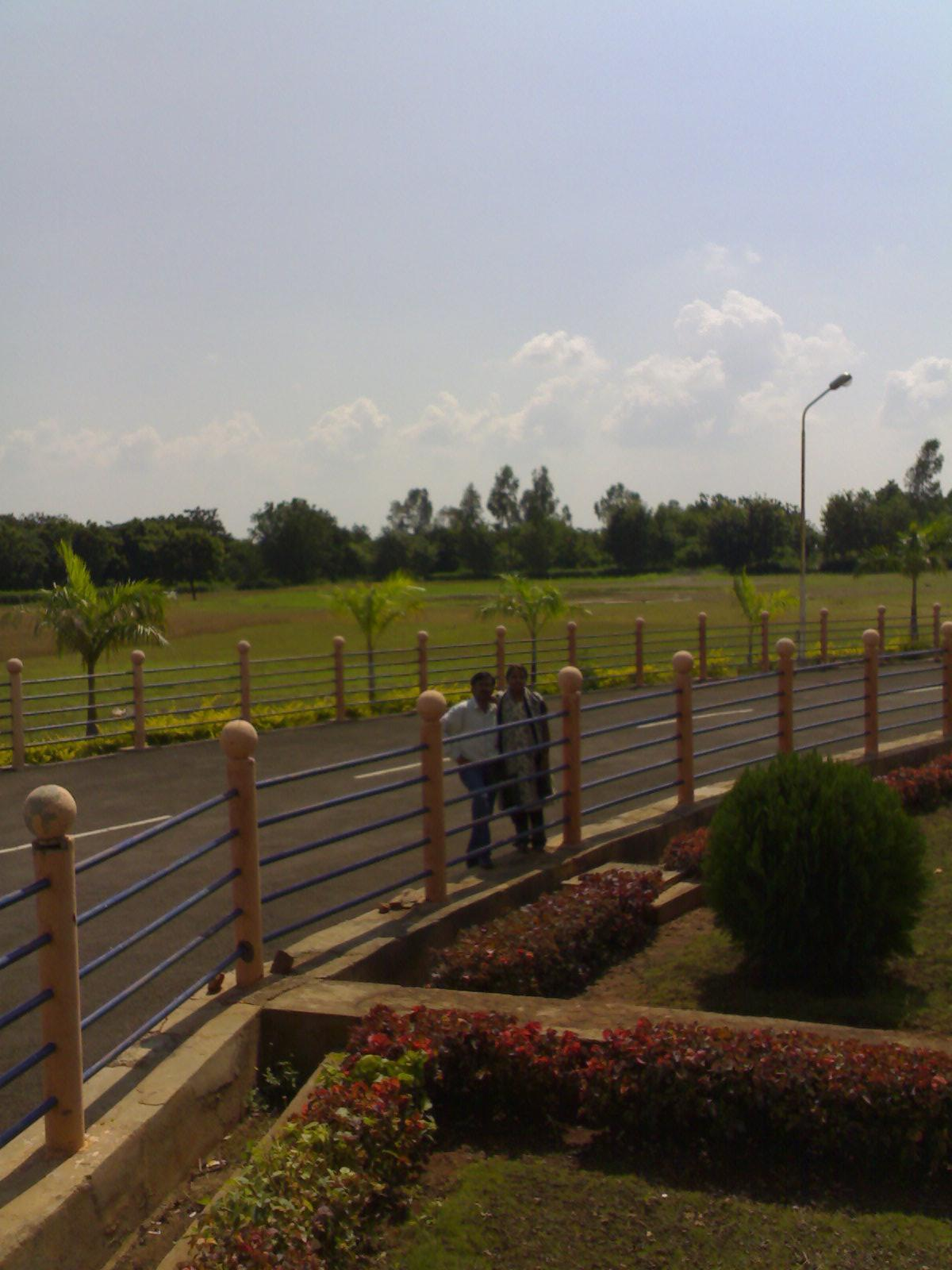

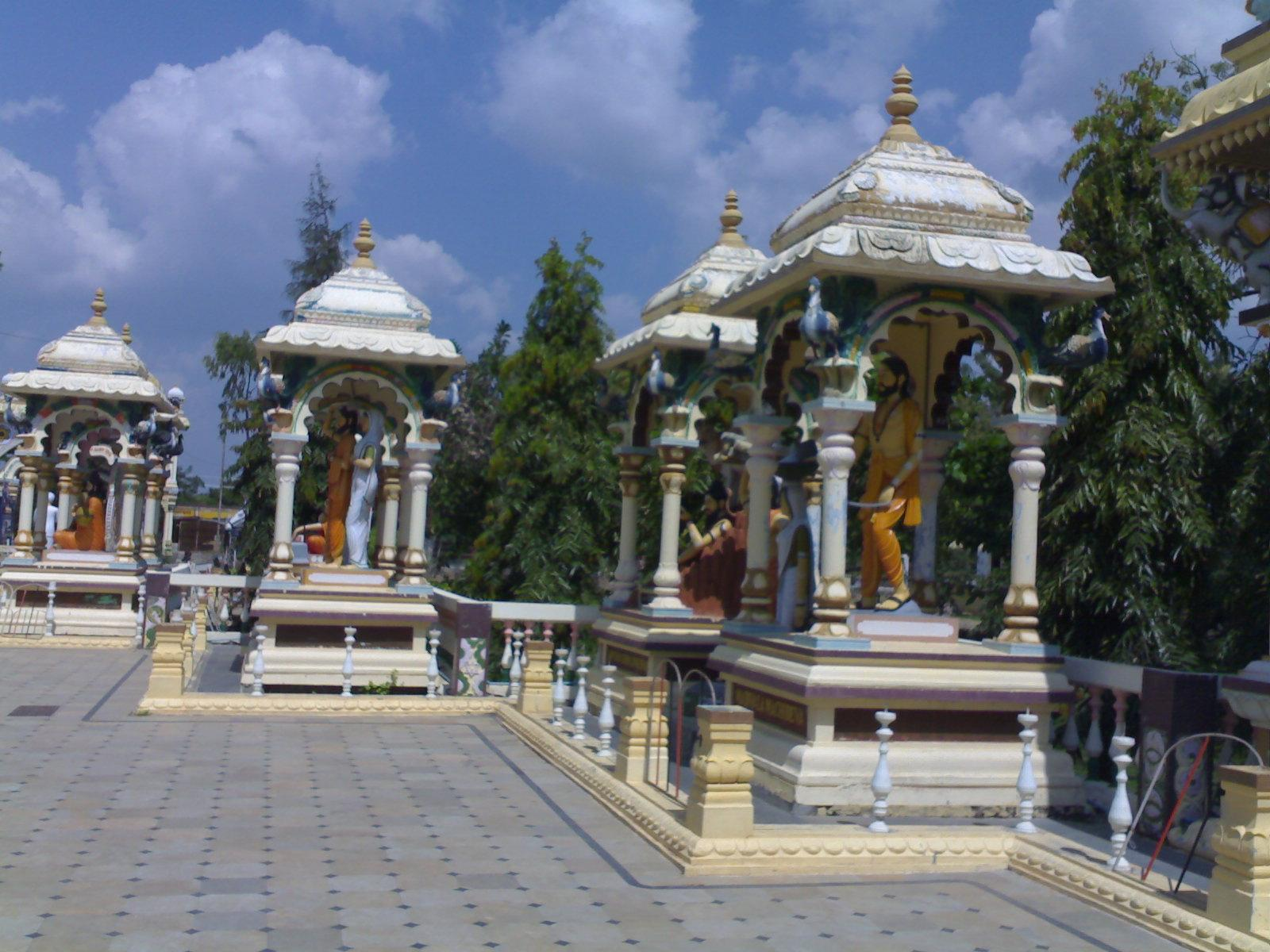

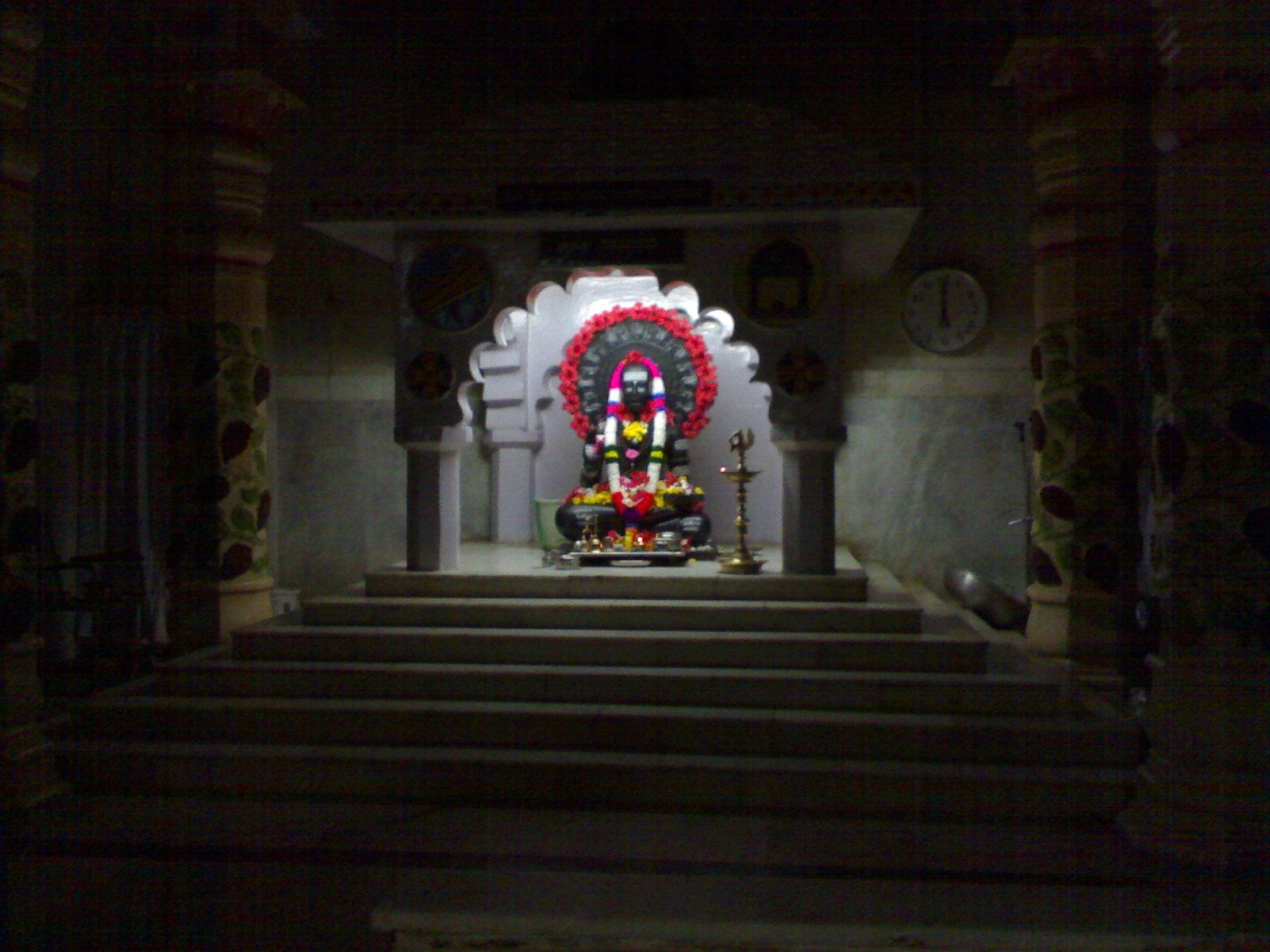

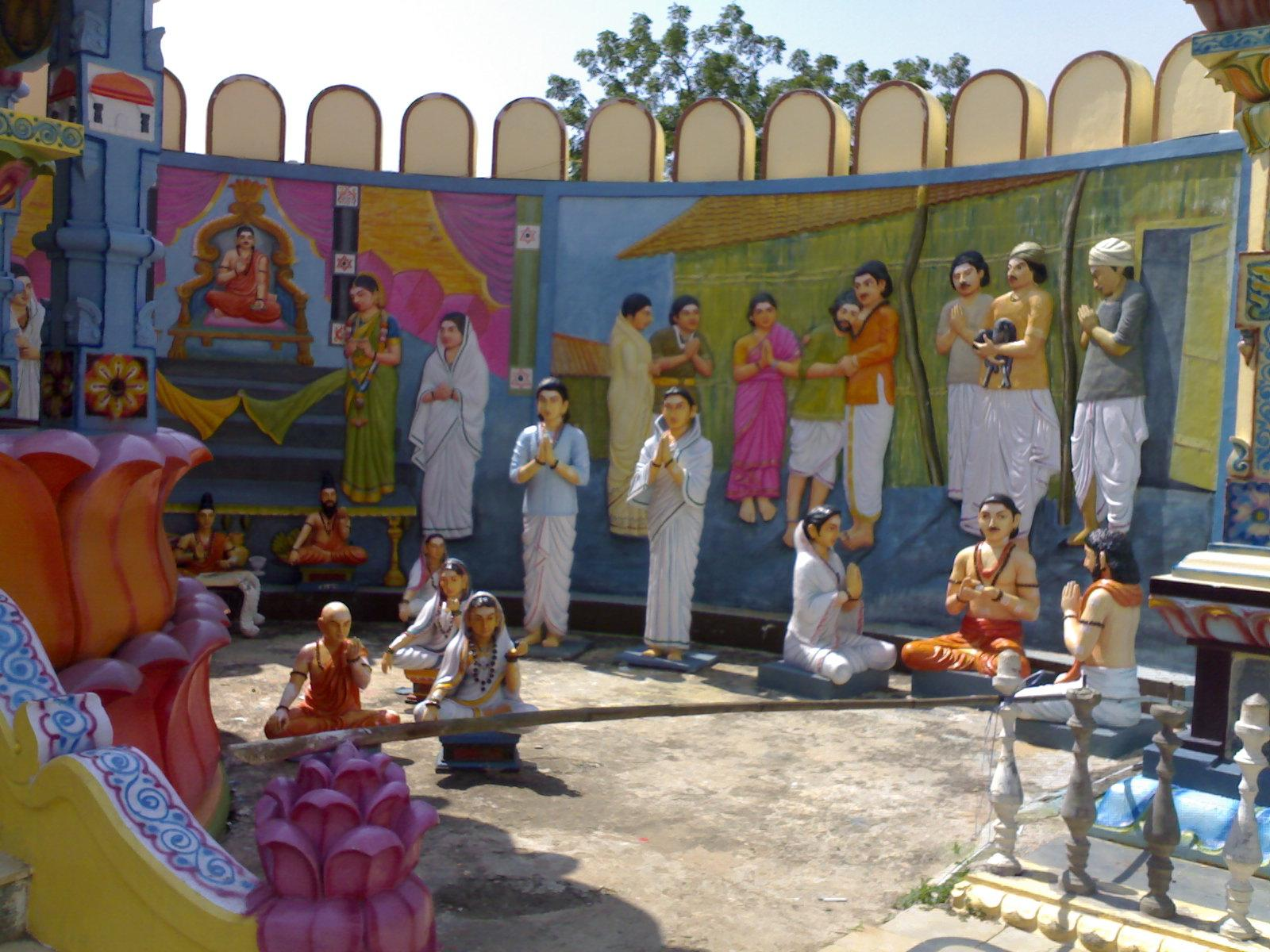

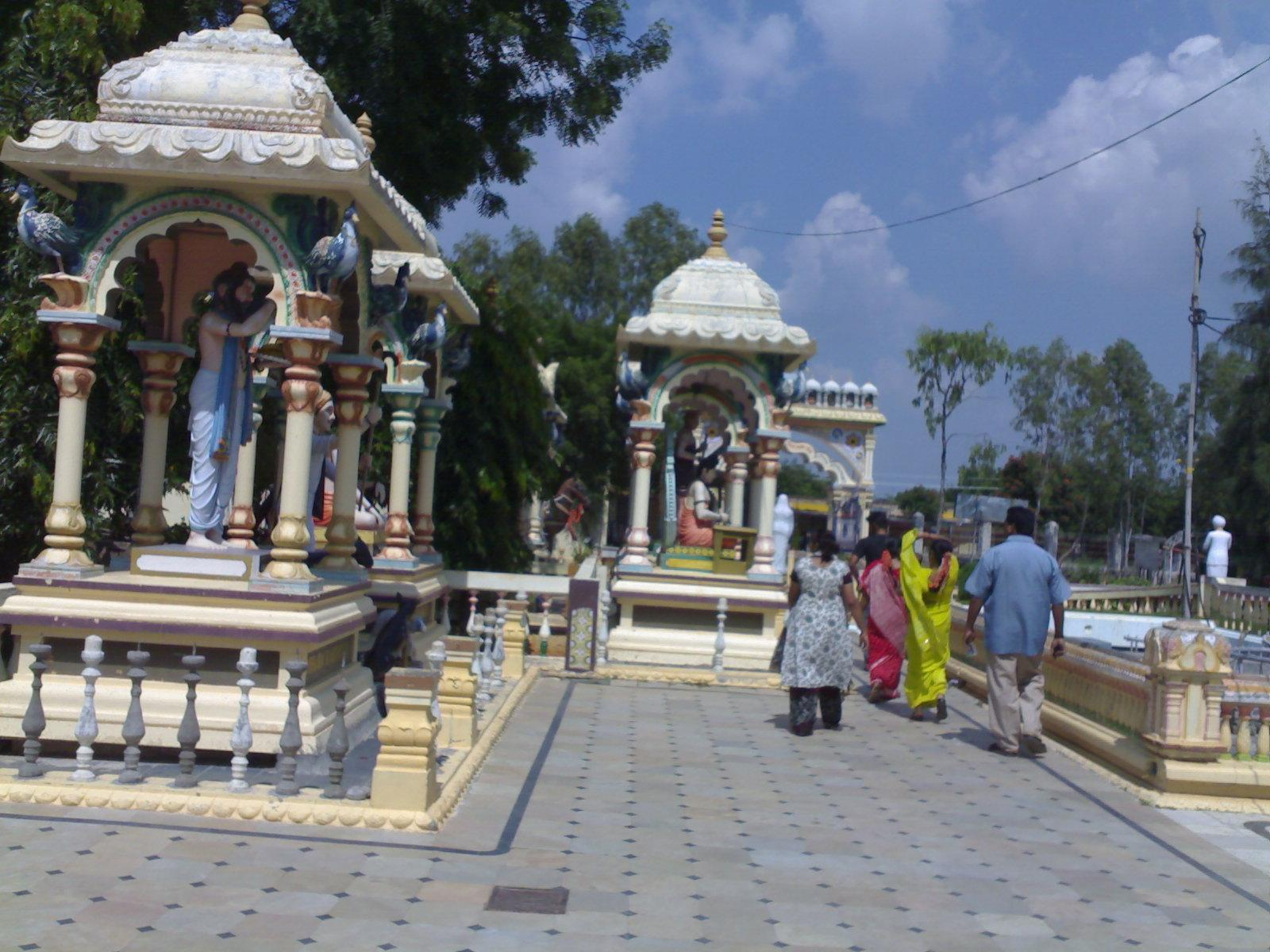

== See also ==
- Basavakalyan
- Ulavi
- Basavana Bagewadi
- Tangadagi
- Muddebihal
- Bagalkote
- Karnataka
