= Basavana Bagewadi =

- Town
- Location in Karnataka, India
- Coordinates: 16.5833°N 75.967°E
- Country: India
- State: Karnataka
- District: Bijapur
- Elevation: 607 m (1,991 ft)

Population (2001)
  - Total: 28,582

Languages
  - Official: Kannada
- Time zone: UTC+5:30 (IST)
- PIN: 586 203
- Telephone code: 08358
- ISO 3166 code: IN-KA
- Vehicle registration: KA-28
- Website: karnataka.gov.in

Basavana Bagewadi is a municipality and taluka in Bijapur district (Now Vijayapura District) in the state of Karnataka, India.

== History ==
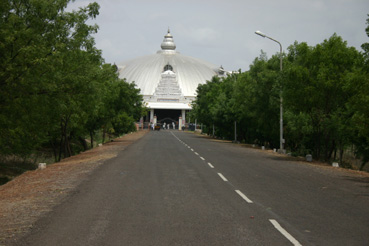
Kudal Sangam

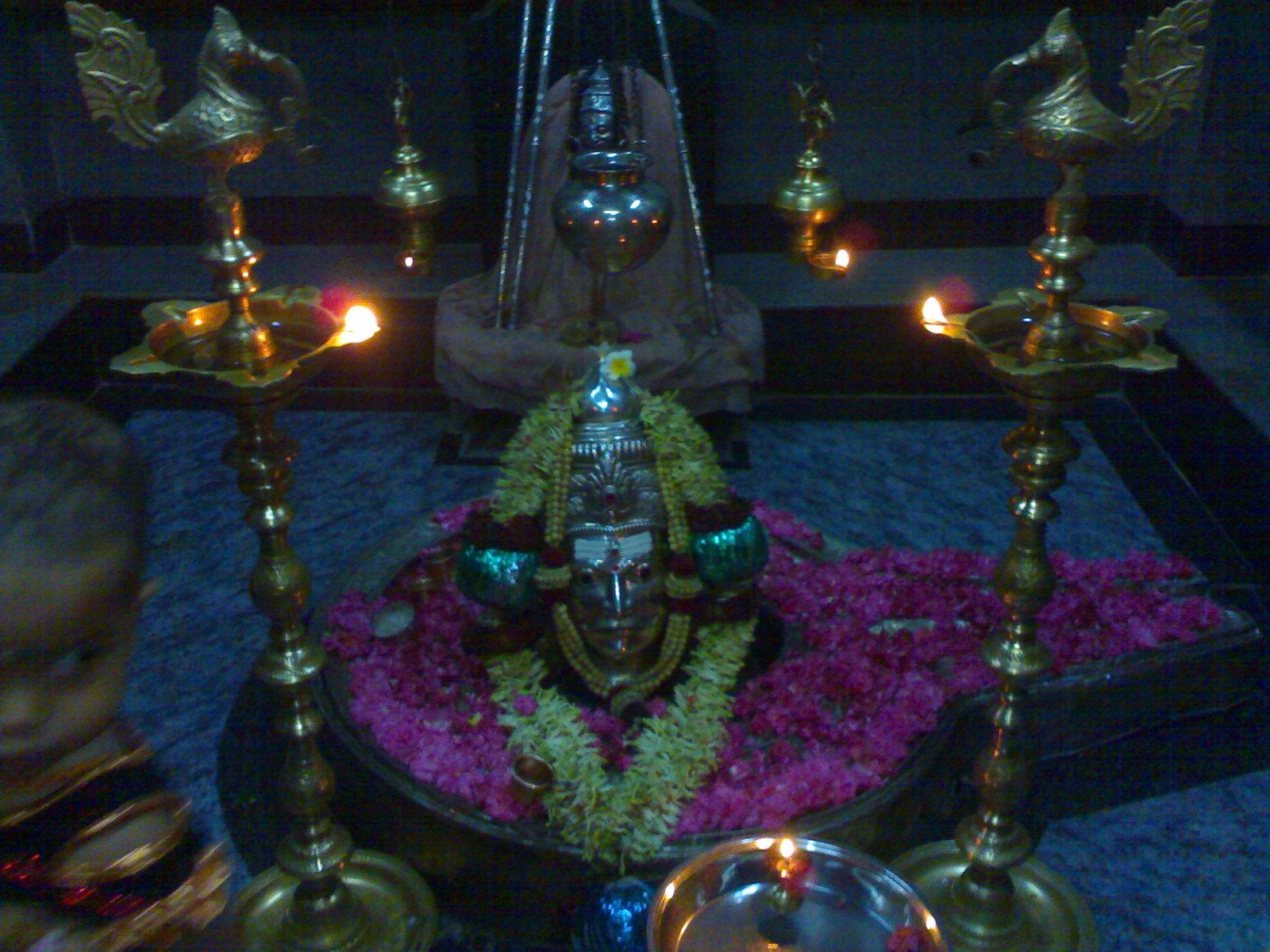
Kudala Sangama

Basavana Bagewadi town is claimed to be the birthplace of Basava, the philosopher of the Lingayat sect. The Basaveshwar Temple was constructed in the 11th century during the rule of the Chalukya dynasty.

== Geography ==
The town of Basavana Bagewadi is in Basavana Bagewadi Taluka. The town of Basavana Bagewadi is situated along Bijapur–Bangalore National Highway No.13 at a distance of 44 kilometres (27 mi) from Bijapur, and 493 kilometres (306 mi) distance from the state capital of Bangalore.

== Demographics ==
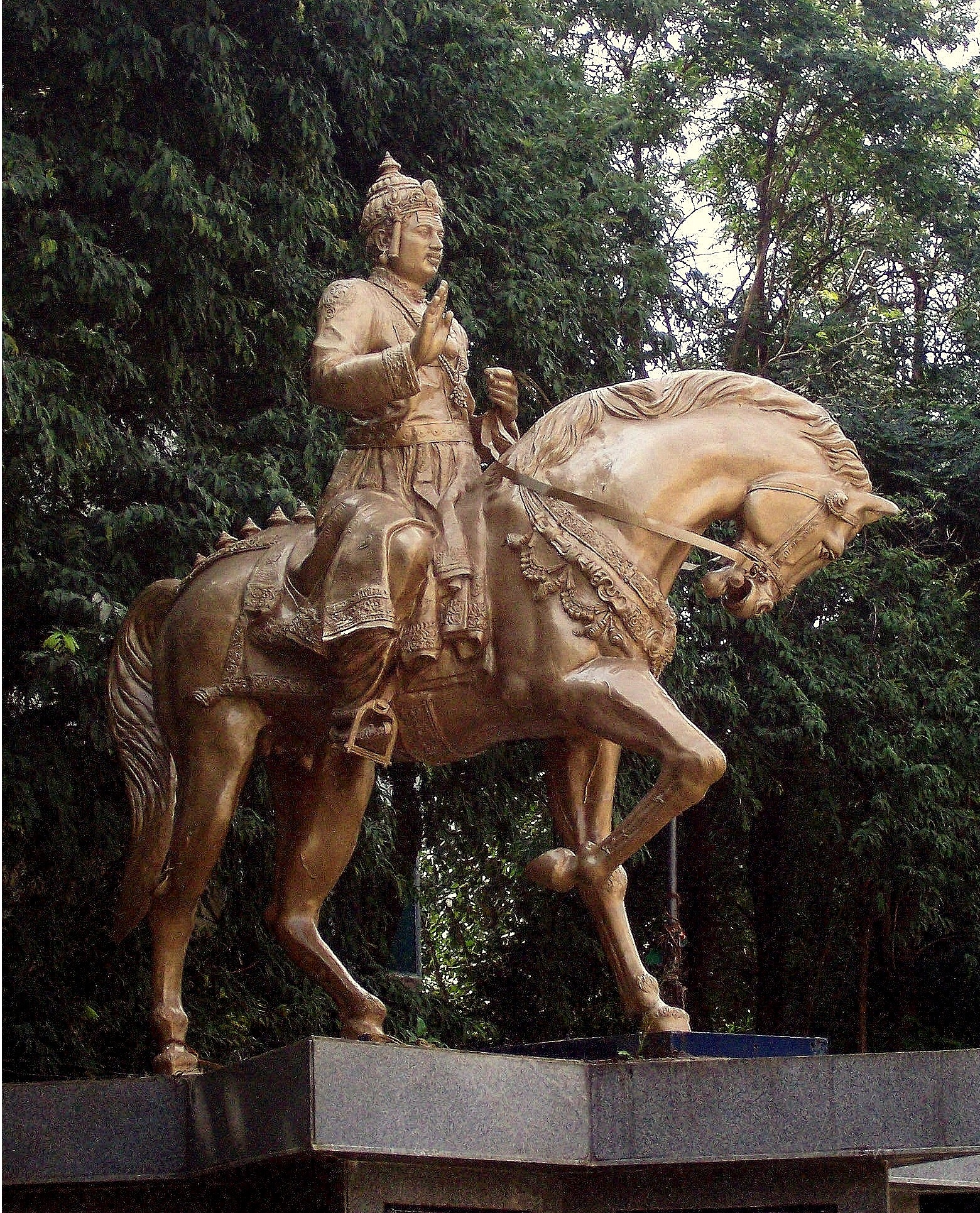
Lord Basavanna

As of 2001 India census, the town of Basavana Bagevadi had a population of 28,582. Males constitute 51% of the population and females 49%. Basavana Bagevadi had an average literacy rate of 53%, lower than the national average of 59.5%; with 61% of the males and 39% of females literate. 16% of the population was under 6 years of age.

Basavana Bagewadi is a town in Basavana Bagewadi Taluk, Bijapur District District, Karnataka State. Basavana Bagewadi is 44.4 km distance from its District Main City Bijapur . And 433 km distance from its State Main City Bangalore.

The Town Municipal Council (TMC) Basavana Bagewadi was constituted in 1973. It is situated along Bijapur - Bangalore National Highway No.13 at a distance of 42 km from Bijapur. Basavana Bagewadi town is a historic place where Shri Lord of Basavna was born, the birthplace call as "Basava Smarak" now comes under Kudal Sangam Authority department Basavana Bagewadi. It has a population of 28,526 as per census 2001. The TMC has 23 wards and equal number of councilors and 5 Numbers of Nominee Councilors. Basavana Bagewadi TMC stretches to an area of 10.30 km^{2}.

=== Religion ===
According to 2011 census, out of a population of 33,198, Hindus were 82.96% and Muslims were 15.90%.

== Government and politics ==
=== Administration ===
The Town Municipal Council (TMC) Basavana Bagewadi was constituted in 1973. The TMC has 23 wards and equal number of councilors and 5 Numbers of Nominee Councilors. Basavana Bagewadi TMC stretches to an area of 10.30 sq km. Kudagi super national thermal power project 18 kilometres (11 mi), Basavan Bagewadi road Railway Station 19 kilometres (12 mi).

In 1994 the town elected Patil Basanagoda Somanagouda, a representative of the Indian National Congress party.

In 2012 the town's MLA of India S.K. Bellubbi handed over 623 houses to flood victims.

=== Divisions ===
There are 38 panchayat villages in Basavana Bagewadi Taluka:

- Alamatti
- Arashanagi
- Beeraladinni
- Byakod
- Chimmalagi
- Dindawar
- Donur
- Golasangi
- Huvina Hipparagi
- Hanamapur
- Hebbal
- Hunshyal PB
- Ingaleshwar
- Itagi
- Kalgurki
- K.Salawadagi
- Kanakal
- Kolar
- Kudagi
- Malaghan
- Managuli
- Mannur
- Markabbinahalli
- Masabinal
- Masuti
- Mulawad
- Muttagi
- Narasalagi
- Nidagundi
- Ronihal
- Sasanur
- Satihal
- Talewad
- Telagi
- Ukkali
- Vadavadagi
- Wandal
- Yalawar
- Yaranal

== See also ==
- Basavakalyan
- Bijapur
- Sindagi
- Chadchan
- Kudalasangama
- Bagalkot
- Muddebihal
