= Nidagundi =

- Town
- Location in Karnataka, India Nidagundi (India)
- Coordinates: 16°21′28.518″N 75°56′7.992″E
- Country: India
- State: Karnataka
- District: Vijayapura
- Talukas: Nidagundi

Government
  - Type: Panchayat raj

Population (2021)
  - Total: 100,000+

Languages
  - Official: Kannada
- Time zone: UTC+5:30 (IST)
- Postal code: 586213
- ISO 3166 code: IN-KA

Nidagundi is a city in the southern state of Karnataka, India. It is located in the Nidagundi taluk of Vijayapur district in Karnataka.

== Demographics ==
At the 2001 India census, Nidagundi had a population of 5788 with 2987 males and 2801 females.

== See also ==
- Belgaum
- Districts of Karnataka
