= Bijapur taluk =

Taluka in Karataka, India

Bijapur Taluk Bijapur Taluka
- Taluka
- Vijayapura Taluka
- Interactive map of Bijapur Taluk
- Coordinates: 16.75°N 75.68°E
- Country: India
- State: Karnataka
- Headquarters: Bijapur
- Towns / Villages: 1 / 131

Government
  - Type: Taluka Panchayat
  - Body: Bijapur Taluka Panchayat

Area
  - Total: 2,648 km^{2} (1,022 sq mi)

Population (2011)
  - Total: 721,075
  - Density: 272.3/km^{2} (705.3/sq mi)

Languages
  - Official: Kannada
- Time zone: UTC+5:30 (IST)
- Telephone code: + 91 (0) 8352
- Vehicle registration: Bijapur KA- 28
- Website: vijayapura.nic.in

Bijapur Taluk, officially Vijayapura Taluka, is a taluka in the Indian state of Karnataka. It is located in the Bijapur district. The administrative centre for Bijapur Taluka is in the city of Bijapur. The taluka is located in the southwest quadrant of the district. In the 2011 census there were forty-six panchayat villages in Bijapur Taluka. The main river in the taluka is the Don River.

== Geography ==
Bijapur Taluka is in the southwestern part of Bijapur District, with Maharashtra state and Indi Taluka to the north, Sindagi Taluka and Basavana Bagewadi Taluka to the east, Bagalkot District to the south, and Belgaum District and Maharashtra state to the west. It covers 2,659.24 square kilometres (1,026.74 sq mi), which is slightly more than a quarter (25.24%) of the district.

== Demographics ==
In the 2001 India census, Bijapur Taluka reported 569,348 inhabitants, with 292,687 males (51.4%) and 276,661 females (48.6%), for a gender ratio of 945 females per 1000 males. Those 569,348 people represent 31.51% of the people in Bijapur District. Based upon households, the taluka was 45.2% urban in 2001; but based upon individuals it was only 44.6% urban. In either case, Bijapur Taluka was the most urban in the district. The population density was 214 people per square kilometer, and as expected was the densest in the district. The overall literacy rate was 51.7%, the highest in the district. In terms of religion in 2001, Bijapur Taluka was 77.2% Hindu, 21.4% Muslim, 1.6% Christian, and 0.8% Jain. That was the lowest Hindu percentage in the district, and the highest Muslim, the highest Christian and the highest Jain percentages in the district.

Bijapur Taluka had one city, Bijapur C.M.C., and 118 villages, all of them inhabited. Of those villages forty-six were panchayat villages.

== Electoral constituencies ==
For the Indian Parliament, the Lok Sabha, Bijapur Taluka participates in the Bijapur constituency.

== Transport ==
Bijapur Taluka has five of the eighteen railroad stations in the district. There are 106 kilometres of National Highway in the taluka, 139 kilometres of State Highways and 638 km of major district roads. The main highways in the taluka are the renumbered National Highway 50 and National Highway 52 (old NH13 and NH218). Additionally, the taluk is also served by newly declared National Highway 166E and National Highway 561A.

== Points of interest in taluka ==
- The mausoleum of Mohammed Adil Shah was built in 1659 and is topped by a large dome, the second largest dome, unsupported by pillars, in the world.

== Villages ==
Villages in Vijayapur Taluk

- Adavisangapur
- Aheri
- Ainapur
- Agasanahalli
- Alaginal
- Aliyabad
- Ankalagi
- Arakeri
- Arjunagi
- Atalatti
- Babaladi
- Babaleshwar
- Babanagar
- Baratagi
- Bellubbi
- Bijjaragi
- Bolachikkalaki
- Bommanalli
- Buranpur
- Bhutnal
- Chikkagalagali
- Chintamani
- Dadamatti
- Danawadahatti
- Dasyal
- Devapur
- Devar Gennur
- Dhanaragi
- Dhanyal
- Domanal
- Dudihal
- Dyaberi
- Gonasagi
- Gugadaddi
- Gunadal
- Gunaki
- Hadagali
- Halagani
- Hanchinal (PH)
- Hanchinal (PM)
- Hangaragi
- Hanamasagar
- Harnal
- Hebbalahatti
- Hegadihal
- Hittinahalli
- Hokkundi
- Honaganahalli
- Honawad
- Honnāli
- Honnutagi
- Hosur
- Hubanur
- Hunsyal
- Inganal
- Itangihal
- Jainapur
- Jalageri
- Jambagi (A)
- Jambagi (H)
- Jumnal
- Kaggod
- Kakanagiri
- Kakhandaki
- Khilarahatti
- Krishnanagar
- Kallakavatagi
- Kambagi
- Kanabur
- Kanamadi
- Kanamuchanal
- Kannal
- Kannur
- Karjol
- Katakanahalli
- Katnalli
- Katral
- Kaulagi
- Kengalagutti
- Khatijapur
- Kotabagi
- Kotyal
- Kamatagi
- Kumate
- Lingadahalli
- Lohagaon
- Madagunaki
- Madasanal
- Madabhavi
- Makanapur
- Malakandevarahatti
- Mamadapur
- Mangalur
- Minchinal
- Nagaral
- Nagathan
- Nandyal
- Navarasapur
- Nidoni
- Ratnapur
- Rambhapur
- Rampur
- Sangapur (SH)
- Sarawad
- Savanalli
- Shegunashi
- Shirabur
- Shirnal
- Shivanagi
- Siddapur
- Siddapur K
- Somadevarahatti
- Sutagundi
- Tajapur
- Tajapur H
- Takkalaki
- Tidagundi
- Tiganibidari
- Tikota
- Tonsyal
- Toravi
- Ukumanal
- Uppaladinni
- Utnal
- Yakkundi
- Yatnal
