= Babalad =

Babalad Muttyna Babalad
- village
- Location in Karnataka, India Babalad (India)
- Coordinates: 16.50°N 75.60°E
- Country: India
- State: Karnataka
- District: Vijayapura district, Karnataka
- Talukas: Vijayapura, Karnataka

Population (2010)
  - Total: 3,000
  - Density: 200/km^{2} (520/sq mi)

Languages
  - Official: Kannada
- Time zone: UTC+5:30 (IST)
- PIN: 586125
- Telephone code: 08352
- Vehicle registration: KA-28
- Nearest city: Vijayapura, Karnataka
- Sex ratio: 60:40 ♂/♀
- Literacy: 70%
- Lok Sabha constituency: Vijayapura
- Vidhan Sabha constituency: Vijayapura
- Climate: hot and cold (Köppen)

Babalad or Muttyna Babalad is a village in the southern state of Karnataka, India. It is located in Vijayapura taluk of Vijayapura district, Karnataka. It is nearly 25 km from the district headquarters, Vijayapura . It's one of several small villages near Vijayapura.

== Demographics ==
As of the 2010 Indian census, Babalad had a population of 1,500 with 800 males and 700 females.

== Shree Guru Chakravarti Babaladi Sadashiv Murthy Mutt ==
It is one of the Hindu pilgrimage sites in the northern district of Karnataka. It is one of the Babaladi mutt. The village Babaladi is situated on the banks of the Krishna River and is also submerged in backwater of the Alamatti Reservoir (Lal Bhahadur Shastri Sagar).

== Agriculture ==
More than 80% of the village's land is well-irrigated. Main crops grown: sugar cane and maize. Other sources of irrigation include the Krishna river, water canals and bore wells.

== Religion ==
Village is having mainly Hindu and Muslim community people.

== Language ==
People speak mainly Kannada.

== Temples ==
The village has several temples, Such as

- Shree Guru Chakravarti Babaladi Sadashiv Murthy Mutt.
- Shree Rameshwar Temple
- Shree Basaveshwar Temple
- Shree Hanuman Temple
- Shree Mahalakshmi Temple
- Shree Durga Devi Temple
- Shree Dhyamavva Devi Temple
- Shree Yallamma Devi Temple

== Mosques ==
Mosque and Maszid for Muslim community. Moharam and Uras festivals are celebrated by both Hindu and Muslim religion.

== Trusts ==
Some associations are put on cultural and sports events and other activities:

== Transportation ==
Babaladi is connected to Bijapur through Babaleshwar.

== State Highway ==
State Highway - 55 is passes near by village.

State Highway - 55 => Babaleshwar - Kambagi - Galagali- Mudhol - Yadawad - Yaragatti

== Education ==
In the village there is a Govt. Higher Primary School (HPS, Babaladi), currently working from 1st to 8th standard years, having more than 150 students enrolled. The village has an approximate literacy rate of 70%.

== Literacy Rate ==
The village literacy rate is about 75%. Males has 75% and Female has 70% of literacy.

== Politics ==
Babaladi village comes under Babaleshwar Assembly Constituency and Vijayapur Parliamentary Constituency.

== Telephone Code ==
- Babaleshwar - 08355

== PIN Code ==
- Sarawad - 586125

Post office is in Gunadal and main post office is in Sarawad.

== Festivals ==
The villagers mainly celebrate Babaladi Jatre on behalf of Shree Guru Chaktravarti Babaladi Sadashiv Mutrhy and Shri Hari Pandurang Vittal Saptaha(Dindhi), and also Kara Hunnume, Nagara Panchami, Deepavli, Ugadi and Dassara every year.
