= Taj Jahan Begum =

Consort of Mohammed Adil Shah

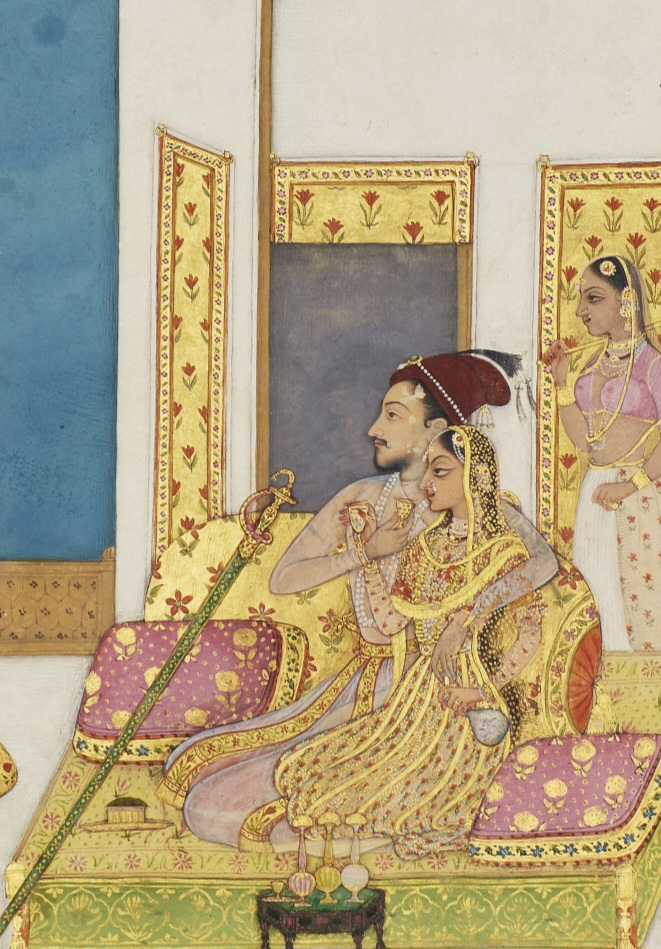
- Painting of Taj Jahan Begum and Muhammad Adil Shah being entertained on a terrace, c.17th century
- Born: Bijapur, Karnataka
- Died: 1660, Bijapur Sultanate
- Burial: Tomb of Jahan Begum, Ainapur, Bijapur, Karnataka
- Spouse: Muhammad Adil Shah
- Dynasty: Adil Shahi (by marriage)
- Father: Nawab Mustafa "Khan Baba"

Taj Jahan Begum, commonly known as Jahan Begum, was a consort of Muhammad Adil Shah, the seventh Adil Shahi Sultan of the Bijapur Sultanate.

== Life ==
Taj Jahan Begum was the daughter of Mustafa Khan, known by the sobriquet of Khan Baba. Mustafa Khan was a prominent prime minister of the Adil Shahi court who had facilitated the peace treaty with Mughal Empire in 1636. According to the court chronicler Zuhur, Muhammad Adil Shah had requested Mustafa Khan to give him Taj Jahan Begum's hand in marriage instead of the other way around, which made Mustafa Khan very proud. The wedding took place in 1633, and was a celebrated affair which was conducted with great festivities. It had sealed the new arrangement of imperial suzerainty under the Mughal Empire negotiated by Mustafa Khan. Ambassadors from all over Hindustan had rode in front of the Bijapur king.

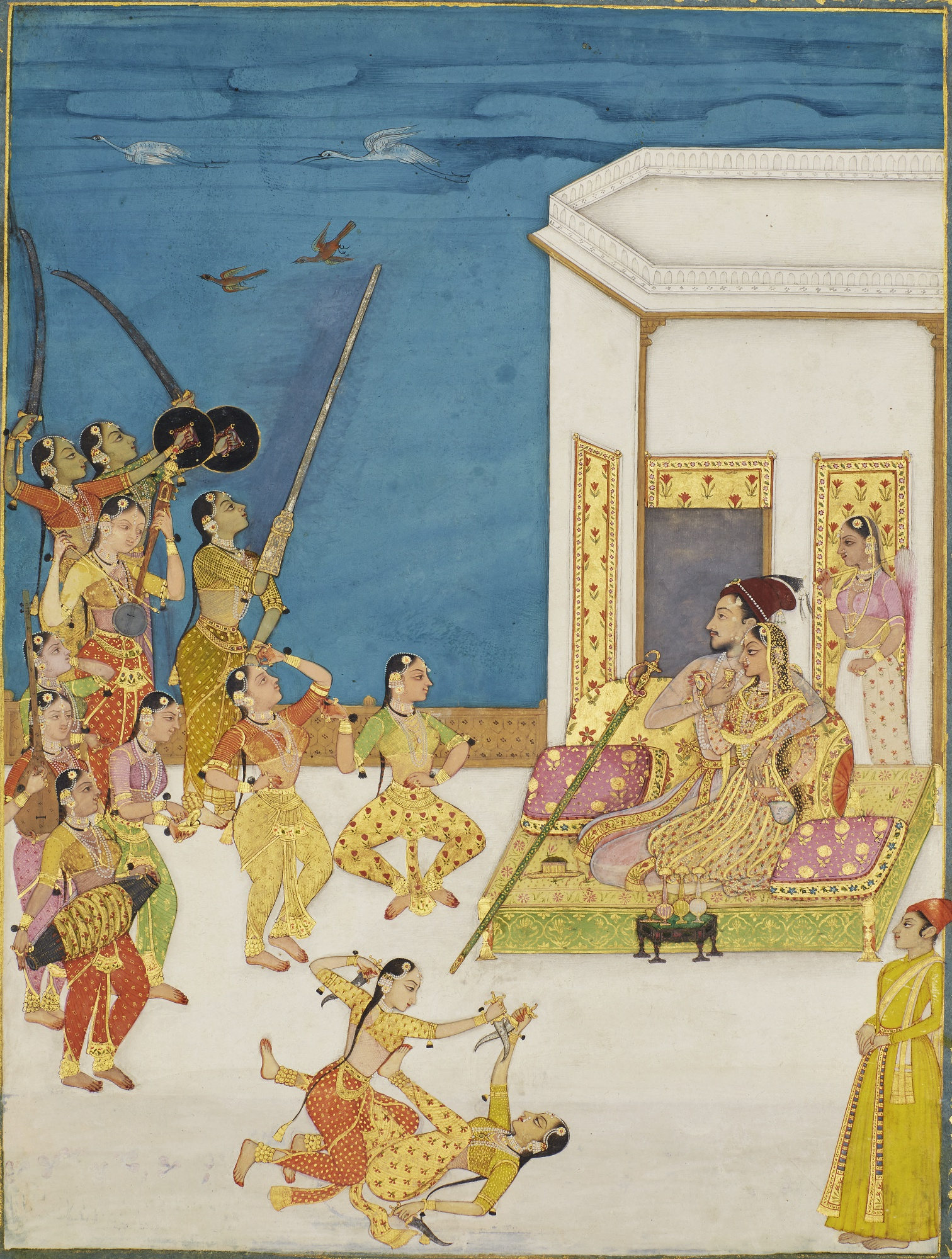
Taj Jahan Begum and Muhammad Adil Shah overseeing a performance, c.17th century

Taj Jahan Begum became his favorite consort and gained significant power, rivalling the power that Bari Sahiba Khadija Sultana held. To demonstrate his favour, he excavated and built a lake and water tank dedicated to her called Begum Talab in 1651, which became a source of water for all the denizens of Bijapur.

She was a patron of the arts, and involved herself with multiple civic projects, nurturing the architecture of Bijapur. She established a suburb bearing her name called Jahanama right outside the densely populated city. The suburb later came to be referred to as Ainapur. She also had her own palace located outside the Ainapur Mahal built in 1641.

== Death and tomb ==
Taj Jahan Begum chose to commisson her own tomb located away the Gol Gumbaz, her husband's tomb; which out of all the women of the palace only houses the graves of Uroos Bibi, Rambha, his senior consort, and his daughter.

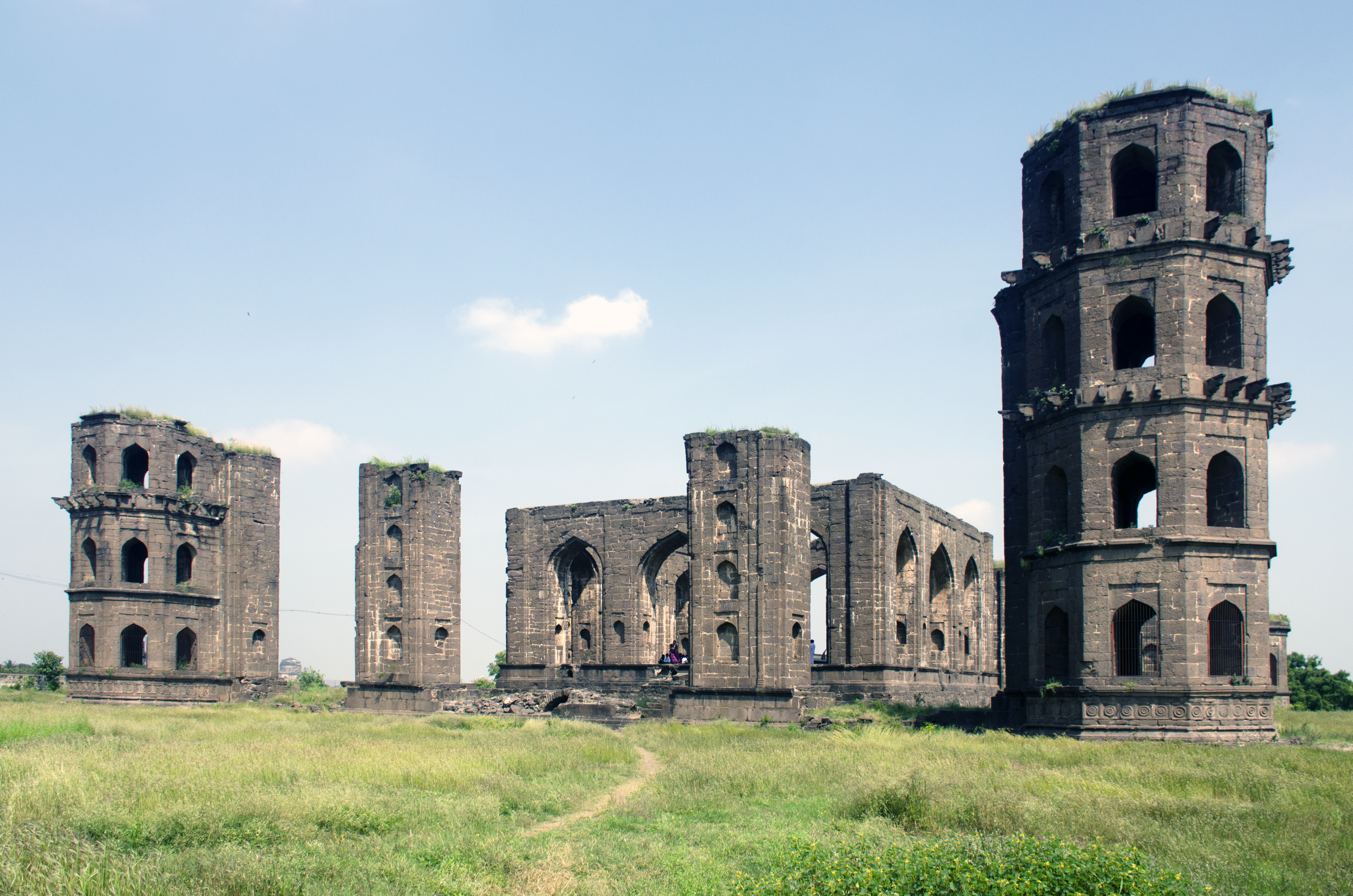
The Tomb of Jahan Begum.
