= Bolachikkalaki =

- village
- Location in Karnataka, India Bolachikkalaki (India)
- Coordinates: 16°33′38″N 75°32′18″E
- Country: India
- State: Karnataka
- District: Vijayapur
- Taluka: Bijapur

Population (2011)
  - Total: 3,095
  - Density: 200/km^{2} (520/sq mi)

Languages
  - Official: Kannada
- Time zone: UTC+5:30 (IST)
- PIN: 586125
- Telephone code: 08355
- Vehicle registration: KA-28
- Nearest city: Vijayapur, Karnataka
- Sex ratio: 60:40 ♂/♀
- Literacy: 65%
- Lok Sabha constituency: Bijapur
- Vidhan Sabha constituency: Babaleshwar
- Climate: hot and cold (Köppen)

Bolachikkalaki village in the southern state of Karnataka, India. Administratively it is under Vijayapur Taluka of Vijayapur district, Karnataka. It is located nearly 45 kilometres (25 mi) from district headquarter Vijayapur.

== Demographics ==
In the 2011 census, the village had a population of 3,095.

== Geography ==
Village is situated geographically at 16* 32' 10 north latitude and 75* 31' 19 east longitude.

== Temples ==
- Shri Hanuman Temple
- Shri Durga Devi Temple
- Shri Pandurang Temple
- Shri Mallikarjun Temple

== Religion ==
Village is having mainly Hindu and Muslim community people.

== Language ==
People speak mainly in Kannada also Hindi, Marathi, Urdu and English as well.

== Mosques ==
Mosque and Maszid for Muslim community. Moharam and Uras festivals are celebrated by both Hindu and Muslim religion.

== Agriculture ==
The village land is quite fertile, with over 70% of it being well-suited to cultivation and crop production. Farmers there grow mainly sugar cane, grapes, maize, and sorghum. Small areas are planted in citrus orchards, and crops such as onions and turmeric. Irrigation is mainly based upon distribution canals from the river, borewells and open wells.

== Education ==
In village a Govt Higher Primary School has currently working with 1st to 7th standard having more than 150 students.

== Charities/trusts ==
There are various associations doing cultural, sports, programmes and other activities.

== Festivals ==
The main celebrated each year are Kara Hunnume, Nagara Panchami, Deepavli, Ugadi, and Dassara.

== Literacy rate ==
The village literacy rate is about 75%. Males has 75% and Female has 65% of literacy.

== Politics ==
Bolachikkalaki comes under Babaleshwar Assembly Constituency and Vijayapur Parliamentary Constituency.

== Telephone code ==
- Babaleshwar - 08355

== PIN code ==
- Sarawad - 586125

Head office is in Sarawad.

== State Highway ==
State Highway - 55 => Babaleshwar - Kambagi - Galagali- Mudhol
