= Hittinahalli =

Hittinahalli may refer to the following places in Bijapur district of Karnataka, India:

- Hittinahalli, Bijapur, village in the Bijapur taluk
- Hittinahalli, Sindgi, village in the Sindgi taluk
