= Mamadapur =

Mamadapur may refer to:

== India ==
=== Karnataka ===
- Mamadapur, Belgaum, a village in Gokak taluka, Belgaum district
- Mamadapur, Bijapur, a village in Bijapur taluka, Bijapur district
- Mamadapur, Haveri, a village in Shiggaon taluka, Haveri district
- Mamadapur (KL), a village in Chikodi taluka, Belgaum district

=== Maharashtra ===
- Mamadapur, Latur, a village in Latur taluka, Latur district
