= Mamadapur, Bijapur =

Mamadapur
- village
- Location in Karnataka, India Mamadapur (India)
- Coordinates: 16°32′08″N 75°35′53″E
- Country: India
- State: Karnataka
- District: Bijapur
- Taluka: Bijapur

Population (2011)
  - Total: 4,641

Languages
  - Official: Kannada
- Time zone: UTC+5:30 (IST)

Mamadapur is a panchayat village in the southern state of Karnataka, India. Administratively, Mamadapur is under Bijapur Taluka of Bijapur district in Karnataka. The village of Mamadapur is 8.5 km by road southeast of the town of Kambagi, and 43 km by road south of the city of Bijapur.

There are three villages in the Mamadapur gram panchayat: Mamadapur, Hanchinal (PM) and Uppala-Dinni.

== Demographics ==
In the 2001 India census, the village of Mamadapur had a population of 3,818 with 1,913 males and 1,905 females.

In the 2011 census, the village of Mamadapur had a population of 4,641.
