= Aheri =

Aheri may refer to:

- Aheri, Gadchiroli, Maharashtra, India
  - Aheri Assembly constituency, Maharashtra Legislative Assembly
- Aheri, Karnataka, India
- Aheri, Papua New Guinea
- Aheri, a community with origins in India, also known as Aheria
- Aheri Gondi language, a Gondi (Dravidian) language of India
