= Kakhandaki =

- town
- Location in Karnataka, India Kakhandaki (India)
- Coordinates: 16.6010°N 75.6405°E
- Country: India
- State: Karnataka

Languages
  - Official: Kannada
- Time zone: UTC+5:30 (IST)
- Postal code: 586132
- ISO 3166 code: IN-KA
- Vehicle registration: KA
- Website: karnataka.gov.in

Kakhandaki is a village in Bijapur district, Karnataka, India, approximately 11 kilometers from the Babaleshwar Taluk.

Historically the irrigation infrastructure was predominantly reliant on open wells and tube wells. Irrigation has undergone minor improvement in the 21st century.

== Area ==
The village Kakhandaki falls in Vijayapura district situated in Karnataka state, with a population 7798. The male and female populations are 3997 and 3801 respectively. The size of the area is about 86.0 square kilometer.

Area (2020)	86.0 km²
Population (2020)	7798
Population Density	133 people per km²
Male Population	3997
Female Population	3801

== Population ==
Demographic and socio-economic information about Kakhandaki village in Bijapur district, Karnataka, based on the Population Census 2011.

- Kakhandaki has a population of 7038 people residing in 1224 families, with 3608 males and 3430 females.
- The village has a significant child population, with 1115 children aged 0–6, constituting 15.84% of the total population.
- The average sex ratio in Kakhandaki is 951, lower than the state average of 973, with a child sex ratio of 922, also lower than the state average.
- The village has a lower literacy rate compared to the Karnataka state average, with a literacy rate of 57.74%. Male literacy is higher at 67.83% compared to female literacy at 47.18%.
- The village is administrated by a Sarpanch elected representative under the Panchayati Raj Act. However, there is no available information about schools and hospitals in the village on the referenced website.

Census Parameter	Census Data
Total Population	7038
Total No of Houses	1224
Female Population %	48.7 % ( 3430)
Total Literacy rate %	48.6 % ( 3420)
Female Literacy rate	19.4 % ( 1366)
Scheduled Tribes Population %	0.0 % ( 1)
Scheduled Caste Population %	21.1 % ( 1485)
Working Population %	41.0 %
Child(0 -6) Population by 2011	1115
Girl Child(0 -6) Population % by 2011	48.0 % ( 535)

Particulars	Total	Male	Female
Total No. of Houses	1,224	-	-
Population	7,038	3,608	3,430
Child (0-6)	1,115	580	535
Schedule Caste	1,485	757	728
Schedule Tribe	1	0	1
Literacy	57.74 %	67.83 %	47.18 %
Total Workers	2,888	1,940	948
Main Worker	2,254	-	-
Marginal Worker	634	249	385
