= Ankalagi =

Ankalagi may refer to the following places in Indian state of Karnataka:

- Ankalagi, Bagalkot, a village in Bagalkot district
- Ankalagi, Bijapur, a village in Bijapur district

== See also ==
- Ankalgi, a village in Gokak taluk, Belagavi district, Karnataka
