= Arakeri =

Arakeri may refer to the following places in Karnataka, India:

- Arakeri, Bijapur
- Arakeri, Bagalkot
