= Satyakama =

Anantakrishna Shahapur
- Born: 2 March 1920; Galagali, Bilagi taluka, Bagalkot district
- Died: 20 October 1998 (aged 78); Bangalore, India
- Occupations: Author, Journalist
- Writing career
- Language: Kannada

Anantakrishna Shahapur (1920–1998) popularly known as Satyakama was a Kannada writer, Indian freedom fighter and a journalist who was born on 2 March 1920 in Galagali village of Bagalkot district, Karnataka.

== Literary works ==
- Tantrayoni
- Devana Innondu Baagilu
- Ashwaghosha
- Chanda Prachanda
- Kamana Billu
- Kaalinalli Kannirali
- Ardha Daari
- Krishnarpana
- Rhushi Panchami
- Vijnyana Bhairava
- Vichitra Veerya
- Rajabali
- Abhinava
- Aahuti
- Panchamagala Naduve
- Rajakreede
- Kapila Vastu
- Nagarananju
- Manemaru
- Benkiya Magalu
- Bendreyavara Kavyadalli Rasa Siddhi
- Swatantra
- Lavanya
- Manvantara
- Anantha Jeevana
- Mahaniyara Pouranika Kathegalu
- Purushasookta
- Sringara Theertha
- Vi-Prayoga
- Matru Lahari Mattu Itara Kavitegalu
- Tannagina Benki
- Satyakaamara Kathegalu
- Bhruhaspati - Kannada Bharatha Bharathi - 101

=== Poetry collections ===
- Veene
- Matrumandira
- Matrulahari
- Gangalahari
- Shrungara Teertha
- Odeda Kannadi
- Manvantara

=== Story collections ===
- Haleya Rajakeeya
- Naayimoogu

== Awards and honours ==
- Karnataka Sahitya Academy Award
- Rajyotsava Award
