= Siddeshwar Swami =

Indian religious leader (1940–2023)

- Born: Siddagonda Ogappa Biradar; 5 September 1940; Bijjaragi, Bombay Presidency, British India (present-day Vijayapura district, Karnataka, India)
- Died: 2 January 2023 (aged 82); Vijayapura, Karnataka, India
- Education: Karnatak University; Shivaji University
- Title: Pujya Shri Siddheshwara Swamiji
- Profession: Spiritual preacher & Philosopher

Senior posting
- Teacher: Mallikarjun Swamiji

Siddeshwar Swami (Note: Alternatively spelt as Siddheshwar Swami and Siddeshwara Swami. The Hindu religious leader's name is often preceded by the honorific Shri. Swami is also referenced by the honorific Swamiji.) (born Siddagonda Ogappa Biradar; 5 September 1940 – 2 January 2023) was an Indian spiritual preacher and philosopher known for his teachings on yoga and spirituality. Swami was the head of Jnanayogashrama, an ashram in the city of Vijayapura (formerly Bijapur), in the Indian state of Karnataka. He declined the Padma Shri, India's fourth-highest civilian award, when it was awarded to him in 2018. He had earlier declined an honorary doctorate from the Karnatak University.

== Early life ==
Swami was born as Siddagonda Ogappa Biradar on 5 September 1940, to Sangavva and Ogappa Gowda Biradar into a Lingayat family of agriculturists. His father was a zamindar and had six children – three sons and three daughters, with Swami being the eldest. From a young age, he was deeply interested in spiritual matters and spent much of his time studying the Hindu scriptures and practising yoga and meditation. At 14, he completed his primary school education and joined Mallikarjun Swami's ashram as his disciple. He completed his pre-university education in Vijayapura and got a Bachelor of Arts degree from Karnatak University in Dharwad. He followed it with a postgraduate degree in philosophy from Shivaji University in Kolhapur in Maharashtra.

== Religious career ==
After his initiation, Swami spent many years studying and practising the teachings of the Hindu scriptures, particularly the Bhagavad Gita and the Yoga Sutras of Patanjali. He also travelled across India, giving lectures and leading spiritual retreats.

Swami was the head of Jnanayogashrama, an ashram in Vijayapura (formerly Bijapur), in the Indian state of Karnataka. His discourses on various yogic principles, and complex philosophical topics using simple language attracted a large following, across religious barriers. Despite being a Hindu religious leader, his disciples spanned religions including Muslims who used to visit his ashram to hear his lectures. His discourses drew upon anecdotes from Basavanna's Sharana literature and other epics in the local language. He was also known to draw from teachings of Shankaracharya, Madhavacharya, and Ramanujacharya, in addition to other religious prophets including Jesus, Abraham, and Mohammed. Most of his sermons were in the local dialect of Kannada, in addition to Marathi and English.

In addition to his teachings on yoga and spirituality, Swami was also known for his philanthropic efforts, establishing several charitable organisations to help the disadvantaged. He had written over 20 books on Indian philosophy and Vachana sahitya. Many of his discourses were also published as books.

Swami declined the Padma Shri, India's fourth-highest civilian award, when it was awarded to him in 2018, stating that as a sanyasi, or ascetic, "he had no interest in such awards". He had earlier declined an honorary doctorate from the Karnatak University. He also returned a sum of money given by the government of Karnataka for the ashram's development, stating that the ashram did not need it.

== Personal life and death ==
Swami lived in a two-room house within the Jnanayogashrama ashram.

Swami died on 2 January 2023. In his will, he requested that no memorial be built for him and that his body be cremated without any post-death rituals. His final rites were completed in the ashram.
