= Bijjaragi =

- Village
- Location in Karnataka, India Bijjaragi (India)
- Coordinates: 16.69°N 75.74°E
- Country: India
- State: Karnataka
- District: Vijayapur
- Taluka: Vijayapur

Population (2011)
  - Total: 8,073

Languages
  - Official: Kannada
- Time zone: UTC+5:30 (IST)
- Vehicle registration: KA-28
- Nearest city: Vijayapur, Karnataka
- Sex ratio: 914
- Literacy: 69.1%
- Lok Sabha constituency: Vijayapur

Bijjaragi is a village in the State of Karnataka, India. It is located in the Vijayapur taluk of Vijayapur district, Karnataka.

== Demographics ==
As of the Population Census of 2011, there were a total of 1,532 families residing in the village. The total population of Bijjaragi was 8,073, out of which 4,218 were males and 3,855 were females.

== Geography ==
The village is located at 16°54'46.7"N, 75°26'30.3"E.

== River ==
Doni River is the nearest river and flows close to the village during the rainy season for a month or two.

== Economy ==
Farming and agriculture are the main occupations for many people in the village. Food crops grown include cereals - Jowar, Maize, Bajra, and Wheat - and pulses, red, Bengal, and green. The major oilseed crops are sunflower, groundnut, and safflower. Horticulture crops like grapes, pomegranate, ber, guava sapota, and lime are also grown.

== Literacy rate ==
The 2011 Census found that the literacy rate of Bijjaragi was 69.1%, which was higher than the overall 57.3% literacy rate of Bijapur district. The male literacy rate was 78.7% and the female literacy rate was 58.55%.

== Politics ==
Bijjargi village has a gram panchayat administrated by the Assembly Constituency for Babaleshwar of Bijapur District. Nationally, it is part of the Bijapur Lok Sabha constituency.

== Climate and Temperature ==
Climate data for Bijjaragi
Month	Jan	Feb	Mar	Apr	May	Jun	Jul	Aug	Sep	Oct	Nov	Dec	Year
Mean daily maximum °C (°F)	29.2 (84.6)	32.8 (91.0)	35.9 (96.6)	37.9 (100.2)	37.5 (99.5)	34.0 (93.2)	31.1 (88.0)	31.0 (87.8)	31.1 (88.0)	31.0 (87.8)	29.5 (85.1)	29.0 (84.2)	32.5 (90.5)
Mean daily minimum °C (°F)	15.5 (59.9)	17.6 (63.7)	22.6 (72.7)	24.0 (75.2)	25.0 (77.0)	23.0 (73.4)	22.2 (72.0)	22.0 (71.6)	22.7 (72.9)	20.2 (68.4)	16.7 (62.1)	13.0 (55.4)	20.4 (68.7)
Average rainfall mm (inches)	8.6 (0.34)	3.1 (0.12)	6.0 (0.24)	10.0 (0.39)	16.2 (0.64)	61.1 (2.41)	77.1 (3.04)	74.5 (2.93)	62.0 (2.44)	51.6 (2.03)	27.2 (1.07)	3.5 (0.14)	400.9 (15.79)

The village has a semi-arid climate, and an average elevation of 606 metres (1988 ft) above sea level.

== Notable people ==
- Bhāskara II - It is believed that Bhaskaracharya II, an Indian mathematician and astronomer (1114–1185), was born in Bijjargi village.
- Siddeshwar Swami (was born in Bijjaragi Siddagonda Ogappa Biradar; 5 September 1940 – 2 January 2023) was an Indian spiritual preacher and philosopher known for his teachings on yoga and spirituality. Swami was the head of Jnanayogashrama, an ashram in the city of Vijayapura (formerly Bijapur), in the Indian state of Karnataka.
