= Gunadal =

Gunadal Gundal
- village
- Location in Karnataka, India Gunadal (India)
- Coordinates: 16°32′11″N 75°29′45″E
- Country: India
- State: Karnataka
- District: Bijapur
- Taluka: Bijapur

Population (2011)
  - Total: 2,711

Languages
  - Official: Kannada
- Time zone: UTC+5:30 (IST)
- PIN: 586125
- Telephone code: 08355
- Vehicle registration: KA-28
- Nearest city: Bijapur, Karnataka
- Sex ratio 2001: 60:40 ♂/♀
- Literacy (2001): 75%
- Lok Sabha constituency: Bijapur
- Vidhan Sabha constituency: Babaleshwar
- Climate: hot and cold (Köppen)
- Website: www.gunadal.com

Gunadal is a panchayat village in the state of Karnataka, India. Administratively it is under Bijapur Taluka of Bijapur district, Karnataka. Located in the far southwestern corner of the district, Gunadal is nearly 45 km by road from the district headquarters, the city of Bijapur. In Gunadal, there is a Government Ayurvedic Hospital, Government Veterinary Hospital, Post Office, Police Station, and Gram panchayat headquarters.

There are four villages in the Gunadal gram panchayat: Gunadal, Babalad, Kengalagutti, and Shirabur.

== Demographics ==
In the 2001 Indian census, the village of Gunadal had a population of 2,136, with 1,131 males and 1,005 females.

In the 2011 census, the village of Gunadal had a population of 2,711.

== Temples ==
- Shri Pandurang Temple
- Shri Kalika Devi Temple
- Shri AmoghaSiddeshwar Temple
- Shri Durga Devi Temple
- Shri Basaveshwar Temple
- Shri Venkateshwar Temple
- Shri Mallikarjun Temple

== Agriculture ==
The village land is quite fertile, with over 90% of it being well-suited to cultivation and crop production. Farmers there grow mainly sugar cane, grapes, maize, and sorghum. Small areas are planted in citrus orchards, and crops such as onions and turmeric. Irrigation is mainly based upon distribution canals from the river, borewells, and open wells.

== Education ==
The Govt Higher Primary School has currently working with 1st to 7th standard having more than 250 students and the Indira Gandi Memorial New High School is working with 8th to 10th Standards having more than 200 students. The whole village has a higher than 75% literacy rate.

== Festivals ==
The main celebrations of the year are Shri Hari Pandurang Vittal Saptaha (Dindhi) and Khaza Yamanur Uras. Kara Hunnume, Nagara Panchami, Deepavli, Ugadi, and Dassara are also celebrated.
