= Galagali Ramacharya =

Indian Sanskrit scholar and poet of two Mahakavyam

Mahamahopadhyaya Ramacharya Narsimhacharya Galagali (1892–1981) was a notable Indian Sanskrit scholar and poet of two Mahakavyam. He was a recipient of President’s Certificate of Honor. He also received honorary Mahamahopadhyaya honor from Bharatiya Sanskrit Sansthan Parishad Prayag.

He was born in 1893, In Galagali village on the bank of Krishna River in the Bijapur District of Karnataka.
