= Hanamasagar =

Hanamasagar Halasagar
- Village
- Location in Karnataka, India Hanamasagar (India)
- Coordinates: 16.59°N 75.68°E
- Country: India
- State: Karnataka
- District: Vijayapur district, Karnataka
- Taluka: Vijayapur Taluka

Population (2011)
  - Total: 1,435

Languages
  - Official: Kannada
- Time zone: UTC+5:30 (IST)
- Vehicle registration: KA-28
- Nearest city: Vijayapur, Karnataka
- Sex ratio: 966
- Literacy: 66.37%
- Lok Sabha constituency: Vijayapur

Hanamasagar (Halasagar) is a village in the southern state of Karnataka, India. It is located in Vijayapur taluk, of Vijayapur district, Karnataka and is nearly 40km from the district headquarter Vijayapur. It is a small village which is a pilgrim, having the post office at Kambagi and Babaleshwar hobli.

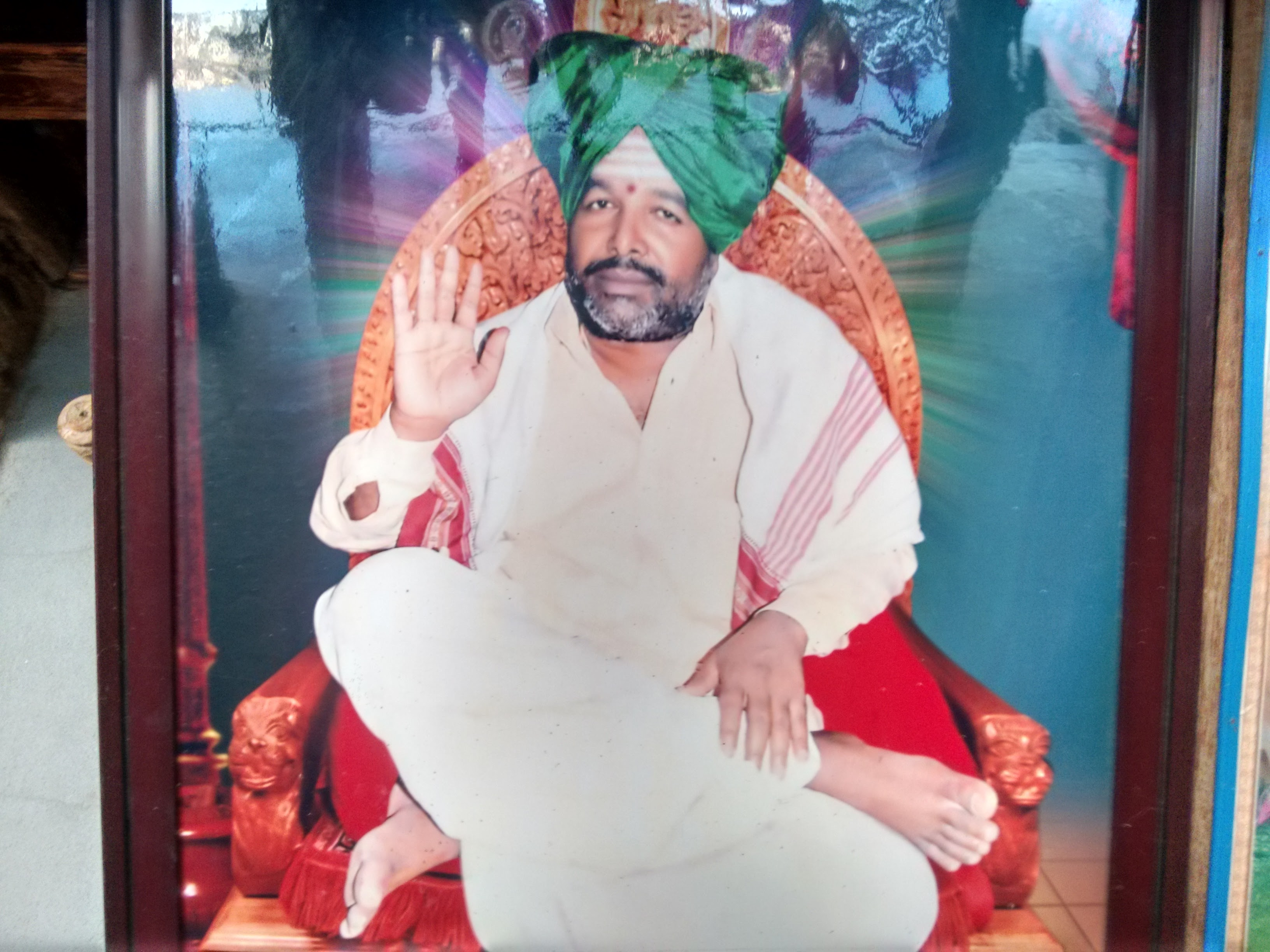
Shree Shivayya Swamiji, Babaladi-Chamakeri

== History ==
Hanamasagar was a pilgrim on behalf of Shree Karigirishwar Swamiji who was there in the last century. Only one photo of Swamiji is available which is featured on the emblem. Every year in the month of July there is a festival. Shree Guru Chakravarti Sadashiv Murthy (Muthya) of Babaladi has a matt in Hanamasagar, i.e., Shri Karigiri Sangam Shivalingeshwar Punyashram (ಶ್ರೀ ಕರಿಗಿರಿ ಸಂಗಮ ಶಿವಲಿಂಗೇಶ್ವರ ಪುಣ್ಯಾಶ್ರಮ,ಸುಕ್ಷೇತ್ರ ಹಣಮಸಾಗರ). and shri Sangameshwar utasava in sravan massa.

== Demographics ==
As of the 2011 Indian Census, Hanumasagar is a medium size village located in Bijapur Taluka of Bijapur district, Karnataka with a total of 242 families residing. The Hanumasagar village has a population of 1435, of which 730 are males and 705 are females according to the 2011 Census.

In Hanumasagar village population of children with age 0-6 is 201 which makes up 14.01% of total population of village. Average Sex Ratio of Hanumasagar village is 966 which is lower than Karnataka state average of 973. Child Sex Ratio for the Hanumasagar as per census is 1209, higher than Karnataka average of 948.

Hanumasagar village has lower literacy rate compared to Karnataka. In 2011, literacy rate of Hanumasagar village was 66.37% compared to 75.36% of Karnataka. In Hanumasagar Male literacy stands at 76.37% while female literacy rate was 55.63%.

== Geography ==
The village is situated geographically at 16°32'11.5"N north latitude and 75°31'16.7"E east longitude.

== Agriculture ==
The village mainly grows sugarcane, grapes, pomegranates, maize, and sorghum (jawar), as well as small area of lemon, onion, and turmeric etc. Irrigation via water canals, bore-wells and open wells.

== Religion ==
The village mainly houses Hindu and Muslim people.

== Language ==
People can speak mainly Kannada also Hindi, Marathi, Urdu and English as well.

== Temples ==
The village has several temples, such as:

- Shri Karigiri Sangam Shivalingeshwar Punyashram
- Shree Sangameshwar Temple
- Shree Hanuman Temple

== Mosques ==
Khaza Bande Nawaz Mosque and Maszid for Muslim community. Moharam and Uras festivals are celebrated by both Hindu and Muslim religion.

== Festivals ==
Annual festivals are celebrating in village, such as Shri Shivalingeshwar Paramarthikotsava, Shri Hari Pandurang Vittal Saptaha (Dindhi), Shree Sangameshwar Festival, Khaza Bandenawaz Uras, as well as Kara Hunnume, Nagara Panchami, Deepavli, Ugadi, and Dassara etc.

== Education ==
Village has a Govt Higher Primary School (HPS) currently working with 1st to 8th standard and having more than 150 students.

== Literacy Rate ==
The village literacy rate is about 66.37%. Males has 76.37% and Female has 55.63% of literacy.

== Politics ==
Hanamasagar village comes under Babaleshwar Assembly Constituency and Vijayapur Parliamentary Constituency. Mahadevappa Balappa Madarakhandi were ex-member of Vijayapur Taluk Panchayat.

== PIN Code ==
- Sarawad(Head Post Office) - 586125

Post office is in Kambagi and head Post office is in Sarawad.

== Transportation ==
State highway 55 passes over Hanamasagar. The village is well connected to district headquarter Vijayapur via Kambagi through Babaleshwar.

== Climate and Temperature ==
Climate data for Hanamasagar
Month	Jan	Feb	Mar	Apr	May	Jun	Jul	Aug	Sep	Oct	Nov	Dec	Year
Mean daily maximum °C (°F)	29.2 (84.6)	32.8 (91.0)	35.9 (96.6)	37.9 (100.2)	37.5 (99.5)	34.0 (93.2)	31.1 (88.0)	31.0 (87.8)	31.1 (88.0)	31.0 (87.8)	29.5 (85.1)	29.0 (84.2)	32.5 (90.5)
Mean daily minimum °C (°F)	15.5 (59.9)	17.6 (63.7)	22.6 (72.7)	24.0 (75.2)	25.0 (77.0)	23.0 (73.4)	22.2 (72.0)	22.0 (71.6)	22.7 (72.9)	20.2 (68.4)	16.7 (62.1)	13.0 (55.4)	20.4 (68.7)
Average rainfall mm (inches)	8.6 (0.34)	3.1 (0.12)	6.0 (0.24)	10.0 (0.39)	16.2 (0.64)	61.1 (2.41)	77.1 (3.04)	74.5 (2.93)	62.0 (2.44)	51.6 (2.03)	27.2 (1.07)	3.5 (0.14)	400.9 (15.79)

Village has a semi-arid climate. It has an average elevation of 606metres (1988ft).

The climate is generally dry and healthy. In summer, especially in April and May it is too hot; at that time the temperature lays between 40 degree Celsius to 42 degree Celsius. In winter season, from November to January the temperature is between 20 degree Celsius to 30 degree Celsius. Usually the district has dry weather, so the humidity varies from 10% to 30%.
