= Katakanahalli =

Katakanahalli Katnalli
- village
- Location in Karnataka, India Katakanahalli (India)
- Coordinates: 16°45′56″N 75°48′24″E
- Country: India
- State: Karnataka
- District: Bijapur
- Taluka: Bijapur
- Gram panchayat: Hegadihal

Government
  - Type: Panchayati raj (India)
  - Body: Gram panchayat

Population (2011)
  - Total: 2,226

Languages
  - Official: Kannada
- Time zone: UTC+5:30 (IST)
- ISO 3166 code: IN-KA
- Vehicle registration: KA-28
- Nearest city: Bijapur, Karnataka
- Lok Sabha constituency: Bijapur
- Website: karnataka.gov.in

Katakanahalli or Katnalli is a village in the southern state of Karnataka, India. Administratively it is under the panchayat village of Hegadihal, in Bijapur Taluka of Bijapur District, Karnataka. It is nearly 15 km from the district headquarters in the city of Bijapur. It's one of the small villages near to Bijapur city.

== Demographics ==
In the 2001 India census, the village of Katakanahalli had a population of 1,851, with 951 males (51.4%) and 900 females (48.6%), which yielded a gender ratio of 946 females per 1000 males.

In the 2011 census, the village of Katakanahalli had a population of 2,226.

== Temples ==
- Shree Hanuman Temple,
- Shree Mahalaxshmi Temple,
- Shree Sadashiv Mutt.

== Agriculture ==
The village land is quite fertile, with over 80% of it being well-suited to cultivation and crop production. Farmers there grow mainly sugar cane, grapes, maize, and sorghum. Small areas are planted in citrus orchards, and crops such as onions and turmeric. Irrigation is mainly based upon distribution canals from the river, borewells and open wells.

== Transportation ==
Buses run from Katakanahalli to the nearby city of Bijapur and to Ukkali.

== Education ==
In village there is a Govt Higher Primary School (HPS, Katakanahalli) has currently working with 1st to 7th standard having more than 150 students. The mutt is running a highschool viz, Mathoshree Shankremmatayi HighSchool. The whole village have more than 70% of literacy rate.

== Charitable organizations ==
In Katakanahalli village there are various associations doing cultural, sports programmes and other activities.

== Festivals ==
The main celebration of the year is Shri Sadashiv Jatra Mohostava. Also celebrated each year are Kara Hunnume, Nagara Panchami, Deepavli, Ugadi, and Dassara.
