= Pandharinathacharya Galagali =

Indian writer and scholar

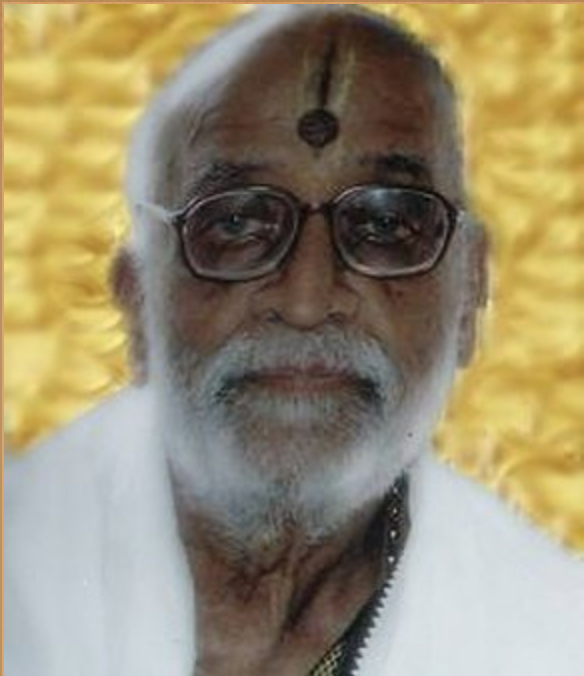
- Born: 10 July 1922; Galagali, Karnataka
- Died: 29 August 2015 (age 93); Hubli, Karnataka
- Other name: Pandhareenathacharya Galagali

Philosophical work
- Era: 20th and 21st Century
- Region: India
- School: Dvaita
- Website: pandhareenathacharya.org

Pandit Pandharinathacharya Galagali (10 July 1922 — 29 August 2015) was a Sanskrit scholar, author, poet, journalist, and orator.
He has authored over 50 books in Kannada and Sanskrit, among which are Shri Shambhu Linga Vijaya Champu (Sanskrit), Raaga Viraga (Kannada), Bharata Swaatantrya Sangramasya Itihasaha (Sanskrit), and Mahabharatada Mahileyaru (Kannada). He was also the editor of five Kannada and Sanskrit newspapers for over four decades.

He is the recipient of various awards and honours, including the Rashtrapati Award (Presidential Award of India) and Dalmia Award. He is also notable for being the first person from the state of Karnataka to win the Sahitya Akademi Award for contributions in Sanskrit.

== Early life ==
Pandharinathacharya Galagali was born on 10 July 1922 to Kurmacharya Galagali in a village named Galagali. His formal education was stopped in the first grade, and he began his study of Vedic literature under his father Kurmacharya Galagali and uncle Ramacharya Galagali.

== Adulthood ==
From 1944 to 1960, he worked as a Sanskrit teacher at Shankrappa Sakri High School in Bagalkot. In 1961, he moved to Gadag, where he started a Sanskrit school called Veera Narayana Pathashala.

In 1971, Acharya Galagali established the Veda Purana Sahitya Mala to translate and publish the 18 Mahapuranas into Kannada (14 have been translated into 18 volumes so far).

For over forty years, Acharya Galagali served as the editor for the following newspapers:

- Shri Sudha (Kannada)
- Madhura Vani (Sanskrit)
- Panchamrutha (Kannada)
- Vaijayanti (Sanskrit)
- Tatvavada (Kannada) - Published by Akhila Bharat Madhwa Mahamandala.

== Style of writing ==
Pandit Galagali's predominant prose style follows that of Banabhatta while his poetic technique resembles that of Kalidasa.
"He excels in the usage of alankāras like Parisamkhyā, Ullekha, Upamā, Ílesa, Mālopamā and Anuprāsa. Galagali is a versatile author and has covered a vast spectrum of various genres in his writings. He is in fact an epitome of creativity and learning in Sanskrit, and being an excellent orator, has [revived] Sanskrit culture through his speeches also."

== Publications ==
Over the course of a lifetime, Pandit Galagali has published 22 original Sanskrit works, 21 original Kannada works, and 23 translated works.

=== Original Sanskrit Works ===
No.	English name	Kannada name
1	Vetandatunda Stavaha	ವೇತಂಡತುಂಡಸ್ತವಃ
2	Kolhapura Mahalakshmi Shatakam	ಕೊಲ್ಹಾಪುರ ಮಹಾಲಕ್ಷ್ಮೀಶತಕಂ
3	Shree Krishnaveni Vaibhavam	ಶ್ರೀಕೃಷ್ಣವೇಣೀವೈಭವಂ
4	Ramarasayanam (Maha Kavyam)	ರಾಮರಸಾಯನಂ ( ಮಹಾಕಾವ್ಯಂ)
5	Janaki Natha Nathanam	ಜಾನಕೀನಾಥನಾಥನಂ
6	Pavana Paavana Champu	ಪವನ ಪಾವನ ಚಂಪೂ
7	Shree Krishnakanthabharanam (Mahakavyam)	ಶ್ರೀ ಕೃಷ್ಣಕಂಠಾಭರಣಂ (ಮಹಾಕಾವ್ಯಂ)
8	Shree Satyadhyana Champu	ಶ್ರೀ ಸತ್ಯಧ್ಯಾನ ಚಂಪೂ
9	Shree Shambhu Linga Vijaya Champu	ಶ್ರೀ ಶ೦ಭುಲಿ೦ಗವಿಜಯ ಚ೦ಪೂ
10	Shree Panduranga Vitthala Champu	ಶ್ರೀ ಪಾಂಡುರಂಗವಿಟ್ಠಲ ಚಂಪೂ
11	Laghu Kathaayaah Gurukatha	ಲಘುಕಥಾಯಾಃ ಗುರುಕಥಾ
12	Shree Sushameendra Vijaya Vaibhavam	ಶ್ರೀ ಸುಷಮೀಂದ್ರವಿಜಯವೈಭವಂ
13	Shree Raghavendra Nakshatramala	ಶ್ರೀ ರಾಘವೇಂದ್ರ ನಕ್ಷತ್ರಮಾಲಾ
14	Shree Raghavendra Ashvadhati	ಶ್ರೀ ರಾಘವೇಂದ್ರ ಅಶ್ವಧಾಟೀ
15	Shree Raghavendra Karunalahari	ಶ್ರೀ ರಾಘವೇಂದ್ರ ಕರುಣಾಲಹರೀ
16	Shree Raghavendra Ashtakam	ಶ್ರೀ ರಾಘವೇಂದ್ರ ಅಷ್ಟಕಂ
17	Shree Raghavendra Suprabhatam	ಶ್ರೀ ರಾಘವೇಂದ್ರ ಸುಪ್ರಭಾತಂ
18	Shree Raghavendra Karavalambana Stotram	ಶ್ರೀ ರಾಘವೇಂದ್ರ ಕರಾವಲಂಬನ ಸ್ತೋತ್ರಂ
19	Bharata Swatantrya Sangramasya Itihasaha	ಭಾರತ ಸ್ವಾತಂತ್ರ್ಯ ಸಂಗ್ರಾಮಸ್ಯ ಇತಿಹಾಸಃ
20	Tatya Topitaha Gandhi Topi Paryantam	ತಾತ್ಯಾಟೋಪೀತಃ ಗಾಂಧೀ ಟೋಪೀ ಪರ್ಯಂತಂ
21	Lokamanya Tilak Charitam	ಲೋಕಮಾನ್ಯ ತಿಲಕ ಚರಿತಂ
22	Kranti Sphulingaha (Krantikari Subhash Chandra Mahodayaha)	ಕ್ರಾಂತಿಸ್ಪುಲಿಂಗಾಃ(ಕ್ರಾಂತಿಕಾರಿ ಸುಭಾಷ ಚಂದ್ರ ಮಹೋದಯಾಃ)

=== Original Kannada Works ===
No.	English name	Kannada name
1	Mahabharata Kosha	ಮಹಾಭಾರತ ಕೋಶ
2	Madhwavagmaya Tapaswigalu	ಮಾಧ್ವವಾಙ್ಮಯ ತಪಸ್ವಿಗಳು
3	Raaga-Viraaga	ರಾಗ-ವಿರಾಗ
4	Mahabharatada Mahileyaru - 1	ಮಹಾಭಾರತದ ಮಹಿಳೆಯರು - ಭಾಗ ೧
5	Mahabharatada Mahileyaru - 2	ಮಹಾಭಾರತದ ಮಹಿಳೆಯರು - ಭಾಗ ೨
6	Mahabharatada Mahileyaru - 3	ಮಹಾಭಾರತದ ಮಹಿಳೆಯರು - ಭಾಗ ೩
7	Elu Chiranjeevigalu	ಏಳು ಚಿರಂಜೀವಿಗಳು
8	Pancha Kanyeyaru	ಪಂಚ ಕನ್ಯೆಯರು
9	Bhamati	ಭಾಮತೀ
10	Alakh Niranjan	ಅಲಖ್ ನಿರಂಜನ್
11	Vidyaranyaru	ವಿದ್ಯಾರಣ್ಯರು
12	Mahabharatada Pashu Pakshigalu	ಮಹಾಭಾರತದ ಪಶುಪಕ್ಷಿಗಳು
13	Mahabharatada Maharajaru	ಮಹಾಭಾರತದ ಮಹಾರಾಜರು
14	Mahabharatada Maharshigalu	ಮಹಾಭಾರತದ ಮಹರ್ಷಿಗಳು
15	Karnatakada Samskrta Kavigalu	ಕರ್ನಾಟಕದ ಸಂಸ್ಕೃತ ಕವಿಗಳು
16	Karnatakada Koshakararu	ಕರ್ನಾಟಕದ ಕೋಶಕಾರರು
17	Karnatakada Jyotishigalu	ಕರ್ನಾಟಕದ ಜ್ಯೋತಿಷಿಗಳು
18	Karnatakada Natakakararu	ಕರ್ನಾಟಕದ ನಾಟಕಕಾರರು
19	Karnatakada Vayyakaranigalu	ಕರ್ನಾಟಕದ ವೈಯಾಕರಣಿಗಳು
20	Karnatakada Nayyayikaru	ಕರ್ನಾಟಕದ ನೈಯಾಯಿಕರು
21	Kalhanana Raja Tarangini (Kashmeerada Samagra Itihasa)	ಕಲ್ಹಣನ ರಾಜತರಂಗಿಣೀ ( ಕಾಶ್ಮೀರದ ಸಮಗ್ರ ಇತಿಹಾಸ)

=== Translated Kannada Works ===
No.	English name	Kannada Name
1	Harivamsha	ಹರಿವಂಶ
2	Vishnu Purana	ವಿಷ್ಣು ಪುರಾಣ
3	Varaha Purana	ವರಾಹ ಪುರಾಣ
4	Vamana Purana	ವಾಮನ ಪುರಾಣ
5	Matsya Purana	ಮತ್ಸ್ಯ ಪುರಾಣ
6	Kurma Purana	ಕೂರ್ಮ ಪುರಾಣ
7	Skanda Purana	ಸ್ಕಂದ ಪುರಾಣ
8	Shiva Purana	ಶಿವ ಪುರಾಣ
9	Narada Purana	ನಾರದ ಪುರಾಣ
10	Brahma Purana	ಬ್ರಹ್ಮ ಪುರಾಣ
11	Brahmanda Purana	ಬ್ರಹ್ಮಾಂಡ ಪುರಾಣ
12	Bramha Vyvarta Purana	ಬ್ರಹ್ಮವೈವರ್ತ ಪುರಾಣ
13	Padma Purana	ಪದ್ಮ ಪುರಾಣ
14	Linga Purana	ಲಿಂಗ ಪುರಾಣ
15	Ganesha Purana	ಗಣೇಶ ಪುರಾಣ
16	Bhavishyottara Purana	ಭವಿಷ್ಯೋತ್ತರ ಪುರಾಣ
17	Agni Purana	ಅಗ್ನಿ ಪುರಾಣ
18	Markandeya Purana	ಮಾರ್ಕಂಡೇಯ ಪುರಾಣ
19	Vayu Purana	ವಾಯು ಪುರಾಣ
20	Bhagavata	ಭಾಗವತ
21	Hadimooru Puranagalalli Shri Venkateshwara Mahatme	ಹದಿಮೂರು ಪುರಾಣಗಳಲ್ಲಿ ಶ್ರೀ ವೆಂಕಟೇಶ್ವರ ಮಹಾತ್ಮೆ
22	Gangalahari	ಗಂಗಾಲಹರೀ
23	Gangashtaka	ಗಂಗಾಷ್ಟಕ
24	Geetha Bhagavata (Sangeetha Shree Krishna):10,000 Kannada Poems	ಗೀತಭಾಗವತ ( ಸಂಗೀತ ಶ್ರೀ ಕೃಷ್ಣ ): ೧೦,೦೦೦ ಕನ್ನಡ ಪದ್ಯಗಳು

== Awards and recognition ==
- "National Award" by Sahitya Akademi for Shambhu Linga Vijaya Champu, a masterpiece in Sanskrit Champu (a genre consisting of a combination of prose and poetry) - 1983
- Ramkrishna Dalmia's "Sri Vanee Nyaasa" award—Considered the Sanskrit equivalent of a Jnanpith Award. - 21 July 2003
- Rashtrapati Award from the first president of India, Dr. Rajendra Prasad - 1994
- Kannada Kalidasa title conferred by Samyukta Karnataka.
- Vice President of Bijapur's Sanskrit Sahitya Sammelan
- Rajya Prashasti from the state of Karnataka.
- Mahamahopadhyaya honorary degree of Sri Venkateswara University awarded by Rashtriya Samskrita Vidyapeetha of Tirupathi
- Gold medal from Shringeri and Kanchi Kamkoti Math
- Dhyana Pramoda title conferred by Shri Satyatma Tirtha of Uttaradi Math
- Raghavendra Anugraha from Raghavendra Swami Math in Mantralayam.
- Vidvatkula Tilaka by Bangalore Nagarikaru
- Vishwesha Tirtha Prashasti awarded by Pejavara Math - 2003
- Kavi Kula Tilaka title conferred by Admar Math
- Sahitya Ratna title conferred by Vibhudesha Tirtha of Admar Math
- Sachastra Pravachana Vichakshana title conferred by Palimaru Math
- Sanskriti vahaka title conferred by Dharma Sanskriti Prathisthana
- Shastra Pravachana Ratna and Purana Teertha titles conferred by Bhandarkere Swamiji
- Vidyadhi Raja title conferred by Mulubagilu Math
