= Tomb of Jahan Begum =

17th century tomb in Bijapur, Karnataka

Coordinates: 16°49′40″N 75°46′30″E

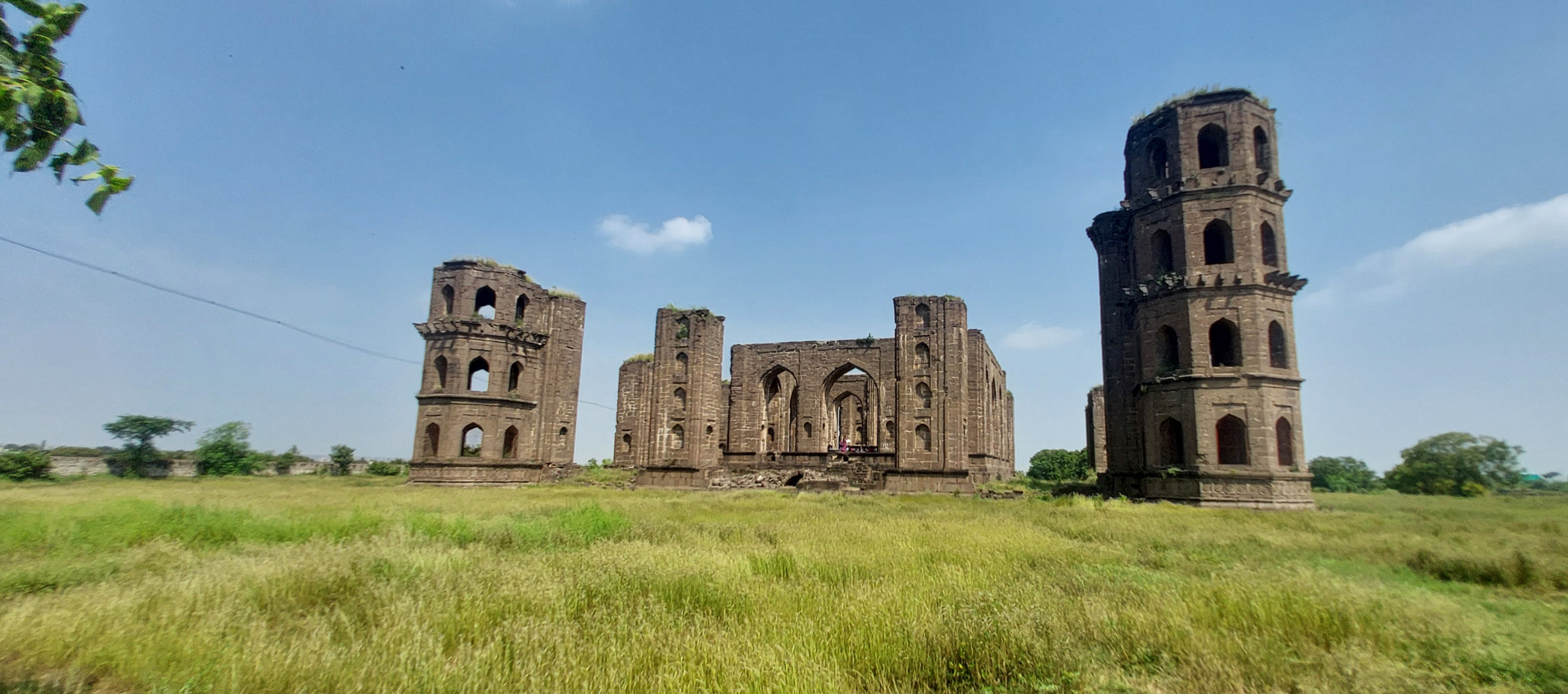
- Interactive map of the Tomb of Jahan Begum area

General information
- Location: Ainapur, Bijapur, Karnataka, India.
- Year built: 17th century

The Tomb of Jahan Begum is a 17th-century mausoleum located in Ainapur, Karnataka, India. It was built for Taj Jahan Begum, the consort of Muhammad Adil Shah, the seventh sultan of Bijapur.

== Architecture ==
it is an incomplete structure, and It shares similarities in terms of architecture and size with the Gol Gumbaz. It features four corner towers, a square layout encircled by a double arcade, with three arches adjacent to each side between the towers. The four central facades are left oopen. Close by her tomb lies the remains of her garden palace.

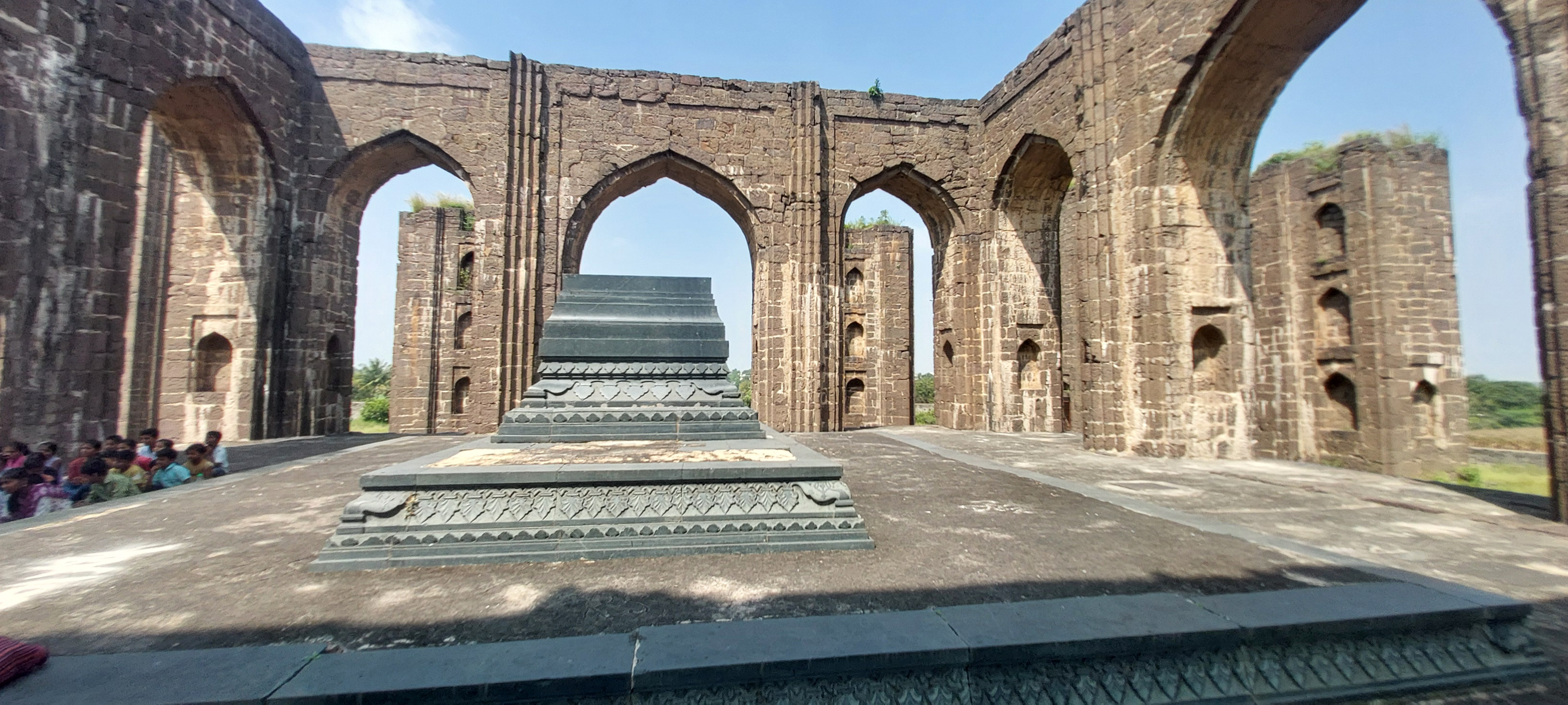
Taj Jahan Begum's grave.

Her cenotaph is crafted from black granite, and supported by several complete arches. The inner walls are intended to enclose the tomb chamber and support the dome

== See also ==
- Gol Gumbaz
