= Nidoni =

- village
- Location in Karnataka, India
- Coordinates: 16.70°N 75.53°E
- Country: India
- State: Karnataka
- District: Bijapur
- Taluka: Bijapur

Population (2001)
  - Total: 5,534

Languages : Kannada, Hindi
  - Official: Kannada
- Time zone: UTC+5:30 (IST)

Nidoni is a village in the southern state of Karnataka, India. It is located in the Bijapur taluk of Bijapur district in Karnataka.

== Demographics ==
As of 2001 India census, Nidoni had a population of 5534 with 2881 males and 2653 females.

== See also ==
- Bijapur district, Karnataka
- Districts of Karnataka
