= Dyaberi =

- village
- Location in Karnataka, India Dyaberi (India)
- Coordinates: 16.8900200°N 75.842440°E
- Country: India
- State: Karnataka
- District: Bijapur
- Taluka: Bijapur

Government
  - Type: Panchayat raj
  - Body: Gram panchayat

Languages
  - Official: Kannada
- Time zone: UTC+5:30 (IST)
- ISO 3166 code: IN-KA
- Vehicle registration: KA
- Website: karnataka.gov.in

Dyaberi is a small village in Bijapur Taluk of Bijapur District, Karnataka, India. It is situated at a distance of 16 km from the district headquarters in the city of Bijapur. It had a population of 2,772 inhabitants according to the 2001 census. The major community in this village is Marathas. The village operates on an agrarian economy.

== Attractions ==
=== Vagdevi Temple ===
Temple of Goddess Vagdevi is a main attraction for devotees. The temple has holy shrines of goddess sisters Vagubai and Neenabai. Goddess Neenabai resides in Doklewadi which comes in Maharastra State.

=== Dyaberi Tank ===
Minor irrigation tank providing water through canal to the village agriculture.

=== Ekthar Sahib Darga ===
A holy Shrine of the Ekthar Sahib

== Transportation ==
You can reach Dyaberi through NWKTRC buses. Alternately you can reach through private cabs etc.,
