= Shegunashi =

- Village
- Location in Karnataka, India Shegunashi (India)
- Coordinates: 16.5716°N 75.0535°E
- Country: India
- State: Karnataka
- District: Belgaum
- Regions of Karnataka: Hollesalu
- Gram Panchayat: 1853
- Talukas: Athani

Government
  - Type: Gram Panchayat administration
  - Body: Shegunashi Gram Panchayat

Population (2001)
  - Total: 5,793

Languages
  - Official: Kannada
- Time zone: UTC+5:30 (IST)
- Postal code: 591220
- Telephone code: 08289
- Vehicle registration: KA-23
- Sex ratio: 958 ♂/♀
- Male Population: 2959
- Female Population: 2834
- Website: www.athanitown.gov.in

Shegunashi is a village in the southern state of Karnataka, India. It is located in the Athani taluk of Belagavi district in Karnataka.

== Demographics ==
As of 2001 India census, Shegunashi had a population of 5793 with 2959 males and 2834 females.

== Transportation ==
Shegunasi has NWKRTC bus service. The nearest railway station is Kudachi railway station, which is 14 km from the city. Belagavi and Kolhapur are the nearest airports.

There is a proposal for a new railway line between Bagalkot–Kudachi-Terdal to connect Bagalkot with Belagavi & Miraj. A survey of this 105.0 km new railway line has been completed and submitted to South Western Railway Hubballi.

== Educational institutions ==
- Shree Murughendra Swamiji (SMS) High School
- Government Kannada Boys Primary School
- Government Kannada Boys High School

== See also ==
- Athani
- Belagavi
- Districts of Karnataka
