= Shivanagi =

- village
- Location in Karnataka, India Shivanagi (India)
- Coordinates: 16.83°N 75.73°E
- Country: India
- State: Karnataka
- District: Bijapur
- Talukas: Bijapur

Population (2001)
  - Total: 7,068

Languages
  - Official: Kannada
- Time zone: UTC+5:30 (IST)

Shivanagi is a village in the southern state of Karnataka, India. It is located in the Bijapur taluk of Vijayapura district in Karnataka.

== Demographics ==
As of 2001 India census, Shivanagi had a population of 8068 with 3669 males and 3399 females.

== See also ==
- Bijapur district, Karnataka
- Districts of Karnataka
