= Doni River =

River in India

The Doni river (Karnataka) (Kannada: ದೋಣಿ) flows eastwards from the area around Sangli in Maharashtra near Karnataka border and Most of its course is within North Karnataka in the districts of Belgaum, Bijapur and Kalaburagi. It joins the Krishna to the southwest of the town of Talikote. It is a sub river of Krishna and its confluence with Krishna river is at Talikote. Sudden flash floods occur in the rainy season near Katnalli and Basavana Bagewadi.

It is prone to irregular flooding. The water is not suitable for use even for washing.
