= Jainapur =

- Village
- Country: India
- State: Karnataka
- District: Belgaum
- Talukas: Chikodi

Languages
  - Official: Kannada
- Time zone: UTC+5:30 (IST)

Jainapur is a village in Belgaum district in the southern state of Karnataka, India.

== Educational institutions ==
- Kannad Primary School Jainapur
- Kannad Primary School JainapurTot

== Temples ==
- Basaveshwar Temple
- Hanuman Temple
- Vittal Mandir
- Mahadev Mandir
- Ganesh Temple
- Virabhadreshwar Temple

== Medical facilities ==
Govt primary health care Jainapur

== Water resources ==
- Jainapur Lake
- Wadral Lake

Ninety percent of farmers and village people are dependent on rain water.

== Occupation of the village people ==
Most of the village people are farmers, some people are teachers, engineers, bus drivers/conductors, clerks, Indian army, police some people work in private sectors.

== Industry ==
Sugar factory Arihant Sugars Ltd is located in the village.

== Societies ==
- Common Service Center @ Jainapur
- Basaveshwar Consumers Society Jainapur
- KMF Jainapur
- Shri Ashtavinayak co-opp Society, Jainapur
- Library society was started recently.
