= Alaginal =

- village
- Location in Karnataka, India Alaginal (Karnataka)
- Country: India
- State: Karnataka
- District: Bijapur

Population (2011)
  - Total: 1,258

Languages
  - Official: Kannada
- Time zone: UTC+5:30 (IST)

Alaginal is a village in the southern state of Karnataka, India. It is located in the Bijapur taluk of Bijapur district.

== Demography ==
In the 2011 census, Alaginal had 189 families with a population of 1,258, consisting of 667 males and 591 females. The population of children aged 0–6 was 218, making up 17.33% of the total population of the village. The average sex ratio was 886 out of 1000, which is lower than the state average of 973 out of 1000. The child sex ratio in the village was 730 out of 1000, which is lower than the average of 948 out of 1000 in the state of Karnataka.
