= Kanamadi =

Kanamadi Kanakamadi
- village
- Nickname: Golden Village
- Location in Karnataka, India Kanamadi (India)
- Coordinates: 16.83°N 75.73°E
- Country: India
- State: Karnataka
- District: Vijayapura
- Named for: Pomegranate & Grape
- Talukas: Vijayapura

Population (2021)
  - Total: 20,000

Languages
  - Official: Kannada
- Time zone: UTC+5:30 (IST)
- Postal code: 586114
- Vehicle registration: KA 28

Kanamadi is a village in the southern state of Karnataka, India. It is located in the Bijapur taluk of Bijapur district in Karnataka. It is a border village between Karnataka and Maharashtra. One end of village is attached to Maharashtra and other end is adjacent to Belagavi District. It is well known for agriculture of Pomegranates and Grapes. Kanamadi is one of largest exporter of Pomegranates in the Bijapur region. It is also famous for 12th Century Dharidevar Temple. And it is historical war place of dharidevara mountain between two kings of God and this temple to kanamadi town on huge underground way is here it's open only the Jatra mahotsava.

== Demographics ==
As of 2001 India census, Kanamadi had a population of 11,200 with 5,328 males and 5,108 females.

== See also ==
- Famous for Shri Dharidevar Temple Kanamadi
- Vijayapura district, Karnataka
- Districts of Karnataka
