= Aheri, Karnataka =

Aheri
- village
- Aheri(Bheri) is in Bijapur district
- Country: India
- State: Karnataka
- District: Bijapur
- Talukas: Bijapur

Government
  - Type: Panchayat raj
  - Body: Village Panchayat

Languages
  - Official: Kannada
- Time zone: UTC+5:30 (IST)
- ISO 3166 code: IN-KA
- Vehicle registration: KA
- Nearest city: Bijapur
- Civic agency: Village Panchayat
- Website: karnataka.gov.in

Aheri (Bheri) is a village in the southern state of Karnataka, India. It is located in the Bijapur taluka of Bijapur district in Karnataka.

== See also ==
- Bijapur district, Karnataka
- Districts of Karnataka

This village is famous for onions.
