= Katnalli =

Katnalli Katakanahalli
- Village
- Location in Karnataka, India Katnalli (India)
- Coordinates: 16.65°N 75.88°E
- Country: India
- State: Karnataka
- District: Bijapur district, Karnataka
- Talukas: Bijapur, Karnataka

Population (2010)
  - Total: 2,000
  - Density: 240/km^{2} (620/sq mi)

Languages
  - Official: Kannada
- Time zone: UTC+5:30 (IST)
- Vehicle registration: KA-28
- Nearest city: Bijapur, Karnataka
- Sex ratio: 60:40 ♂/♀
- Literacy: 70%
- Lok Sabha constituency: Bijapur
- Climate: Hot and cold (Köppen)

Katakanahalli or Katnalli is a village in the southern state of Karnataka, India. It is located in Bijapur taluk of the Bijapur district, Karnataka, and nearly 15 kilometers (km) from the district headquarters, Bijapur. It's one of the small villages near Bijapur.

== Demographics ==
As of 2010, Katakanahalli has a population of 2000 with 1200 males and 800 females.

== Temples ==
Shree Hanuman Temple, Shree Mahalaxshmi Temple and Shree Sadashiv Mutt.

== Agriculture ==
More than 80% of the village's land is fertile and used for crops. The village mainly grows sugar cane, grape, maize, sorghum, and a small amount of lemon, onion and turmeric. Irrigation is mainly based upon water canals, borewells and wells.

== Transportation ==
Katakanahalli is connected to the nearby cities of Bijapur and Ukkali.

== Education ==
In the village there is a Govt Higher Primary School (HPS, Katakanahalli), which currently accommodates over 150 students from the 1st to the 7th standard grade. The whole village has a literacy rate of more than 70%.

== Trusts ==
Some local associations organize cultural and sports programmes, as well as other activities.

== Festivals ==
The villagers mainly celebrate Shri Sadashiv Jatra Mohostava and Kara Hunnume, Nagara Panchami, Deepavli, Ugadi, Dassara every year.
