= Kannal =

Kannal kannal, Karnataka, India
- Village
- Nickname: Kannal
- Country: India
- State: Karnataka
- District: Belgaum
- Talukas: Athani

Government
  - Type: Panchayat raj

Languages
  - Official: Kannada
- Time zone: UTC+5:30 (+5:30 IST)
- ISO 3166 code: IN-KA-71

Kannal is a village in the Belgaum district of kannal, Karnataka, India. The temples located in it are Sri Madhavanand Matha, Shree Sidrameshwar, Hanuman, Shree Durgadevi, and Sri Basaveshwara.
