= Arjunagi =

- village
- Country: India
- State: Karnataka
- District: Bijapur

Population (2011)
  - Total: 2,255

Languages
  - Official: Kannada
- Time zone: UTC+5:30 (IST)

Arjunagi is a village in the southern state of Karnataka, India. It is located in the Bijapur taluk of Bijapur district.

== Demography ==
In the 2011 census, Arjunagi had 431 houses with a population of 2,255, consisting of 1,163 males and 1,092 females. The population of children aged 0–6 was 282, making up 12.51% of the total population of the village. The average sex ratio was 939 out of 1000, which is lower than the state average of 973 out of 1000. The child sex ratio in the village was 774 out of 1000, which is lower than the average of 948 out of 1000 in the state of Karnataka. The total Scheduled Castes and Scheduled Tribes population in the town was 308 people and all were Scheduled Castes. There are 4 people of the Scheduled Tribe in the village.
