= Honawad =

- village
- Location in Karnataka, India Honawad (India)
- Coordinates: 16.81°N 75.42°E
- Country: India
- State: Karnataka
- District: VIJAYAPURA
- Talukas: VIJAYAPURA

Population (2001)
  - Total: 7,921

Languages
  - Official: Kannada
- Time zone: UTC+5:30 (IST)

Honawad is a village in the southern state of Karnataka, India. It is located in the Tikota taluk of Vijayapura district in Karnataka.

== Demographics ==
As of 2001 India census, Honawad had a population of 7921 with 4049 males and 3872 females.

== See also ==
- Districts of Karnataka
