= Jalageri =

- village
- Location in Karnataka, India Jalageri (India)
- Coordinates: 16.83°N 75.73°E
- Country: India
- State: Karnataka
- District: Bijapur
- Talukas: Bijapur

Government
  - Type: Panchayat raj
  - Body: Gram panchayat

Population (2001)
  - Total: 5,444

Languages
  - Official: Kannada
- Time zone: UTC+5:30 (IST)
- ISO 3166 code: IN-KA
- Vehicle registration: KA
- Website: karnataka.gov.in

Jalageri is a village in the southern state of Karnataka, India. It is located in the Bijapur taluk of Bijapur district in Karnataka.

== Demographics ==
As of 2001 India census, Jalageri had a population of 5444 with 2882 males and 2562 females.

== See also ==
- Bijapur district, Karnataka
- Districts of Karnataka
