= Arakeri, Bijapur =

Arakeri
- Town
- Location in Karnataka, India Arakeri (India)
- Coordinates: 16°55′05″N 075°41′42″E
- Country: India
- State: Karnataka
- District: Bijapur
- Taluka: Bijapur

Population (2011)
  - Total: 20,184

Languages
  - Official: [[Kannada][Marathi]]
- Time zone: UTC+5:30 (IST)

Arakeri is a Town in the southern state of Karnataka, India, in the Bijapur Taluka of Bijapur District in Karnataka.

Arakeri lies approximately 10 km from the city of Bijapur, 519 km (322 mi) northwest of the state capital Bengaluru, about 550 km (340 mi) from Mumbai, and 210 km (130 mi) northeast of Belagavi (Belgaum).

The town is home to the Shri Amoghasiddeshwar Temple (also known as Amogh Sidh or Amogasiddh), a revered shrine dedicated to Lord Shiva and an important spiritual landmark in the region.

Arakeri also has a Government High School, a co-educational secondary institution established in 1993. The school offers education for classes 8 to 10 under the Karnataka State Board curriculum. It is equipped with digital classrooms, a library, and computer facilities, and also participates in government initiatives such as the Midday Meal Scheme. The land for the school was donated by the Yadav(Khude) The Maratha family of Arakeri.

== Demographics ==
February 2011 India census, Arakeri had a population of 20,184 with 11,084 males and 9100 females.

== See also ==
- Bijapur district, Karnataka
