= Katral =

- Village
- Location in Karnataka, India Katral (India)
- Coordinates: 17°10′N 75°38′E
- Country: India
- State: Karnataka
- District: Belgaum
- Talukas: Athani

Languages
  - Official: Kannada
- Time zone: UTC+5:30 (IST)

Katral is a village in Belgaum district in Karnataka, India.
