= Muhammad Adil Shah =

Muhammad Adil Shah or Mohammed Adil Shah may refer to:

- Muhammad Adil Shah (died 1557), Sultan of Delhi, of the Sur dynasty
- Mohammed Adil Shah of Bijapur, died 1656 and buried in the Gol Gumbaz
