= Hittinahalli, Sindgi =

Hittinahalli
- village
- Country: India
- State: Karnataka
- District: Bijapur

Population (2011)
  - Total: 1,331

Languages
  - Official: Kannada
- Time zone: UTC+5:30 (IST)

Hittinahalli is a village in the southern state of Karnataka, India. It is located in the Sindgi taluk of Bijapur district.
