= Ainapur, Bijapur =

Ainapur
- village
- Ainapur, Bijapur is in Bijapur district
- Interactive map of Ainapur
- Coordinates: 16°49′47″N 75°46′08″E
- Country: India
- State: Karnataka
- District: Bijapur
- Talukas: Bijapur taluk

Government
  - Body: Village Panchayat

Languages
  - Official: Kannada
- Time zone: UTC+5:30 (IST)
- Vehicle registration: KA
- Nearest city: Bijapur, Karnataka
- Civic agency: Village Panchayat
- Website: karnataka.gov.in

Ainapur, Bijapur is a village in the southern state of Karnataka, India. It is located in the Bijapur taluk of Bijapur district in Karnataka.

== See also ==
- Districts of Karnataka
