= Kambagi =

Kambagi Kambogi
- village
- Location in Karnataka, India Kambagi (India)
- Coordinates: 16°33′38″N 75°32′18″E
- Country: India
- State: Karnataka
- District: Vijayapur district, Karnataka
- Taluka: Vijayapur Taluk

Population (2011)
  - Total: 3,095
  - Density: 200/km^{2} (520/sq mi)

Languages
  - Official: Kannada
- Time zone: UTC+5:30 (IST)
- PIN: 586125
- Telephone code: 08355
- Vehicle registration: KA-28
- Nearest city: Vijayapur, Karnataka
- Sex ratio: 60:40 ♂/♀
- Literacy: 65%
- Lok Sabha constituency: Vijayapur (Lok Sabha constituency)
- Vidhan Sabha constituency: Babaleshwar
- Climate: hot and cold (Köppen)

Kambagi is a panchayat village in the southern state of Karnataka, India. Administratively it is under Vijayapur Taluk of Vijayapur District, Karnataka. It is nearly 40 kilometres (25 mi) from district headquarters, the city of Vijayapur, Karnataka. Kambagi has Government Primary HealthCare Center, Post Office, Bank of India and Gram Panchayat offices.

There are two other villages included the Kambagi Gram Panchayat: Hanamasagar and Madagunaki.

== Demographics ==
In the 2001 India census, the village of Kambagi had a population of 3,663, with 1,850 males and 1,813 females.

In the 2011 census, the village of Kambagi had a population of 3,095.

== History ==
Historical Hanuman temple is present.

== Geography ==
Village is situated geographically at 16* 32' 10 north latitude and 75* 31' 19 east longitude.

== Temples ==
- Shri Chandraprabhu Basti
- Shri Hanuman Temple,
- Shri AmoghaSiddeshwar Temple,
- Shri Durga Devi Temple,
- Shri Pandurang Temple,
- Shri Mallikarjun Temple.

== Religion ==
Village is having mainly Hindu and Muslim community people.

== Language ==
People speak mainly in Kannada.

== Mosques ==
Mosque and Maszid for Muslim community. Moharam and Uras festivals are celebrated by both Hindu and Muslim religion.

== Agriculture ==
The village land is quite fertile, with over 70% of it being well-suited to cultivation and crop production. Farmers there grow mainly sugar cane, grapes, maize, and sorghum. Small areas are planted in citrus orchards, and crops such as onions and turmeric. Irrigation is mainly based upon distribution canals from the river, borewells and open wells.

== Industry ==
Near by Kambagi there is one sugar industry, i.e.,Someshwar Sugar Mills Pvt, Ltd Kambagi.

== Transportation ==
Village is connected to the main town Bijapur via Galagali and Babaleshwar has 45 km and is also connected to surrounding villages: Hanamasagar, Nadyal, Katral, Bolachikkalaki, Madagunaki, Devar-Gennur, Devapur, Mamadapur and Sangapur (SH).

== Education ==
In village a Govt Higher Primary School (HPS, Kambagi) has currently working with 1st to 7th standard having more than 200 students and a Government High School is also working with 8th to 10th Standards having more than 100 students. The whole village having more than 65% of literacy rate.

- Govt Higher Primary School (HPS), Kambagi
- Govt High School, Kambagi
- Shivagiri Pre-Primary School, Kambagi
- Shivagiri Pre-University College, Kambagi

== Charitable Organizations/Trusts ==
There are various associations doing cultural, sports, programmes and other activities.

== Festivals ==
The main celebrations of the year are Jai hanuman Okali and Shri Hari Pandurang Vittal Saptaha( Dindhi). Also celebrated each year are Kara Hunnume, Nagara Panchami, Deepavli, Ugadi, and Dassara.

== Literacy Rate ==
The village literacy rate is about 75%. Males has 75% and Female has 65% of literacy.

== Politics ==
Kambagi comes under Babaleshwar Assembly Constituency and Vijayapur Parliamentary Constituency.

BANK BANK OF INDIA

== Telephone Code ==
- Babaleshwar - 08355

== PIN Code ==
- Sarawad - 586125

Post office is in Kambagi and main post office is in Sarawad.

== State Highway ==
State Highway - 55 is passes by village.

State Highway - 55 => Babaleshwar - Kambagi - Galagali- Mudhol - Yadawad - Yaragatti
