= Galagali =

- Village
- Location in Karnataka, India Galagali (India)
- Coordinates: 16.4160°N 75.4376°E
- Country: India
- State: Karnataka
- District: Bagalkot
- Talukas: Bilgi

Population (2011)
  - Total: 8,380

Languages
  - Official: Kannada
- Time zone: UTC+5:30 (IST)
- PIN: 587117
- Vehicle registration: 29
- Bilagi, Mudhol, Jamkhandi: Bagalkot, Bijapur

Galagali is a village in the southern state of Karnataka, India. It is located on the banks of river Krishna in the Bilgi taluk of Bagalkot district in Karnataka.

It is the birthplace of the Vedic scholar, poet, and orator Pandharinathacharya Galagali.

It is famous for Galagali Peda, a sweet dish.

== Demographics ==
At the 2011 India census, Galagali had a population of 8380 with 4115 males and 4265 females.

== See also ==
- Bagalkot
- Bilagi
- Districts of Karnataka
- Galagali Multimedia
- Pandhareenathachar Galagali
- Krishna river
- Galagali Ramacharya
