= Babaleshwar =

- Taluka
- Location in Karnataka, India Babaleshwar (India)
- Coordinates: 16.83°N 75.73°E
- Country: India
- State: Karnataka
- District: Bijapur
- Taluka: Babaleshwar
- Founder: Santosh

Population (2008)
  - Total: 22,528

Languages
  - Official: Kannada
- Time zone: UTC+5:30 (IST)
- Postal code: 586113
- Nearest city: Bijapur
- Lok Sabha constituency: Bijapur
- Vidhan Sabha constituency: Babaleshwar

Babaleshwar is a taluka place in the southern state of Karnataka, India. It is located in the Bijapur Taluka of Bijapur district in Karnataka. It is 22 km from the district headquarters, the city of Bijapur.

== See also ==
- Bijapur district, Karnataka
- Districts of Karnataka
