= Bardol =

- village
- Location in Karnataka, India Bardol (India)
- Coordinates: 17°10′49″N 75°57′11″E
- Country: India
- State: Karnataka
- District: Bijapur
- Taluk: Chadchan

Population (2011)
  - Total: 6,866

Languages
  - Official: Kannada
- Time zone: UTC+5:30 (IST)
- ISO 3166 code: IN-KA
- Vehicle registration: KA
- Website: karnataka.gov.in

Bardol is a village in the southern state of Karnataka, India. It is located in the Chadchan taluk of Bijapur district in Karnataka.

== Demographics ==
In the 2001 India census, Bardol had a population of 5,537 with 2,942 males and 2,595 females.

In the 2011 census, the population of Bardol was reported as 6,866. Bardol is famous for Grapes production. It's also famous for amenities it equipped with.

== See also ==
- Bijapur
- Districts of Karnataka
