= List of villages in Bagalkot district =

This is an alphabetical list of villages in Bagalkot district, Karnataka, India.

== A ==
- Achanur
- Adagal
- Adihal
- Adihudi
- Agasarakoppa
- Aiahole
- Aihole
- Akkimaradi
- Alagur
- Alur
- Amalazari
- Amarawati
- Aminagad
- Anadinni
- Anawal
- Andamuranal
- Ankalagi
- Arakeri
- Asangi

== B ==
- Badagandi
- Baragi
- Basavanagar
- Belagali
- Belura
- Bennur
- Bevinamatti-S.Haveli
- Bevoor
- Bhairamatti
- Bidari
- Bilkerur

== C-G ==
- Chimmad
- Cholachagudda
- Dammooru
- Dhannur
- Dhavaleshwar
- Fakirbhudihal
- Galagali
- Girisagar
- Gonal
- Gothe
- Gudura

== H-J ==
- Halagali
- Haldur
- Halingali
- Hebballi
- Hipparagi
- Hirepadasalgi
- Hosakoti
- Hullikere
- Hunnur
- Jagadal
- Jaliberi
- Jalihal
- Jalihala
- Jeeragal

== K ==
- Kaladgi
- Kamatagi
- Kandgal
- Karadi
- Kataraki
- Kendura
- Killa Hosakoti
- Kishori
- Kittali
- Kulageri
- Kulhalli
- Kundargi

== L-R ==
- Lakhamapura
- Lokapur
- Mantur
- Mirji
- Mugalkhod
- Muttalageri
- Nagaral
- Navalgi
- {[Neeralakeri]}
- Nilagunda
- Old Channal
- Rugi

== S-Z ==
- Sasalatti
- Savalagi
- Shri Parvatesh
- Shurpali
- Sirur
- Sulibhavi
- Tappasakatti
- Teggi
- Todalbagi
- Tungal
- Uttur
- Vajjaramatti
- Yadahalli
