= Dhannur =

Dhannur Dhannooru
- Village
- Location within Karnataka Location within India
- Coordinates: 16°11′17.73″N 76°5′38.32″E
- Country: India
- State: Karnataka
- District: Bagalkot district
- Taluk: Hungund

Government
  - Type: Panchayat raj
  - Body: Village Panchayat

Population (2001)
  - Total: 2,732

Languages
  - Official: Kannada
- Time zone: UTC+5:30 (IST)
- PIN: 587 118
- ISO 3166 code: IN-KA
- Vehicle registration: KA XX
- Website: karnataka.gov.in

Dhannur also spelled as Dhannooru is a village in the Hungund taluk of Bagalkot district in the Indian state of Karnataka.

Dhannur lies between Hungund and Muddebihal. Dhannur located on the banks of krishna river.

== Demographics ==
As of 2001 India census, Dhannur had a population of 2,732 with 1,426 males and 1,306 females and 399 Households.

== See also ==
- Dammooru, Hunagunda
- Kudalasangama
- Badami
- Hungund
- Bagalkot
- Karnataka
