= Hunnur =

Hunnur Huvinuor
- village
- Location in Karnataka, India Hunnur (India)
- Coordinates: 16.5110°N 75.2639°E
- Country: India
- State: Karnataka
- District: Bagalkot
- Talukas: Jamkhandi

Population (2001)
  - Total: 8,867

Languages
  - Official: Kannada
- Time zone: UTC+5:30 (IST)

Hunnur is a village in the southern state of Karnataka, India. It is located in the Jamkhandi taluk of Bagalkot district in Karnataka.

== Demographics ==
As of 2001 India census, Hunnur had a population of 8867 with 4470 males and 4397 females. According to data available on the 2011 census, the population had increased with approximately 10% to 9,771 with an equal percentage split between men and women.

== See also ==
- Bagalkot
- Districts of Karnataka
