= Todalbagi =

- village
- Location in Karnataka, India Todalbagi (India)
- Coordinates: 16.6230°N 75.4399°E
- Country: India
- State: Karnataka
- District: Bagalkot
- Talukas: Jamkhandi

Population (2001)
  - Total: 7,369

Languages
  - Official: Kannada
- Time zone: UTC+5:30 (IST)
- PIN: 587322
- Telephone code: 08353
- Vehicle registration: KA 48
- Nearest city: savalagi
- Lok Sabha constituency: bagalkot
- Vidhan Sabha constituency: jamakhandi

Todalbagi is a village in the northern part of the state of Karnataka, India. It is located in the Jamkhandi taluk of Bagalkot district in Karnataka state.

== Demographics ==
As of the 2001 India census, Todalbagi had a population of 7369 with 3755 males and 3614 females.
