= Akkimaradi =

- village
- Location in Karnataka, India Akkimaradi (India)
- Coordinates: 16.3310900°N 75.141070°E
- Country: India
- State: Karnataka
- District: Bagalkot
- Talukas: Mudhol

Government
  - Body: Village Panchayat

Languages
  - Official: Kannada
- Time zone: UTC+5:30 (IST)
- Nearest city: Bagalkot
- Civic agency: Village Panchayat

Akkimaradi is a village in the southern state of Karnataka, India. It is located in the Mudhol taluk of Bagalkot district in Karnataka.

== See also ==
Mahalingpur

- Bagalkot
- Districts of Karnataka
