= Adihal =

Coordinates: 16°12′N 76°04′E

- village
- Interactive map of Adihal
- Country: India
- State: Karnataka
- District: Bagalkot
- Talukas: Hungund

Government
  - Body: Village Panchayat

Languages
  - Official: Kannada
- Time zone: UTC+5:30 (IST)
- Nearest city: Bagalkot
- Civic agency: Village Panchayat

Adihal is a village in the southern state of Karnataka, India. It is located in the Hungund taluk of Bagalkot district in Karnataka.

== See also ==
- Bagalkot
- Districts of Karnataka
