= Kulhalli =

- village
- Location in Karnataka, India Kulhalli (India)
- Coordinates: 16.5246°N 75.1653°E
- Country: India
- State: Karnataka
- District: Bagalkot
- Talukas: Jamkhandi

Population (2001)
  - Total: 7,586

Languages
  - Official: Kannada
- Time zone: UTC+5:30 (IST)
- Postal code: 587311

Kulhalli is a village in the southern state of Karnataka, India. It is located in the Jamkhandi taluk of Bagalkot district in Karnataka.

== Demographics ==
As of 2001 India census, Kulhalli had a population of 7586 with 3854 males and 3732 females.

== See also ==
- Bagalkot
- Districts of Karnataka
