= Sulibhavi =

Shulibhavi
- village
- Location in Karnataka, India Shulibhavi (India)
- Coordinates: 16.0417°N 75.9433°E
- Country: India
- State: Karnataka
- District: Bagalkot
- Talukas: Hungund

Population (2001)
  - Total: 8,898

Languages
  - Official: Kannada
- Time zone: UTC+5:30 (IST)

Sulibhavi is a village in the southern state of Karnataka, India. It is located in the Hungund taluk of Bagalkot district in Karnataka.

== Demographics ==
As of 2001 India census, Shulibhavi had a population of 8898 with 4502 males and 4396 females.

== See also ==
- Bagalkot
- Districts of Karnataka
