= Tungal =

- village
- Location in Karnataka, India Tungal (India)
- Coordinates: 16.6968°N 75.2981°E
- Country: India
- State: Karnataka
- District: Bagalkot
- Talukas: Jamkhandi

Population (2001)
  - Total: 6,689

Languages
  - Official: Kannada
- Time zone: UTC+5:30 (IST)

Tungal is a village in the southern state of Karnataka, India. It is located in the Jamkhandi taluk of Bagalkot district in Karnataka.

== Demographics ==
As of 2001 India census, Tungal had a population of 6689 with 3442 males and 3247 females.

== See also ==
- Bagalkot
- Districts of Karnataka
