= Adihudi =

- village
- Location in Karnataka, India Adihudi (India)
- Coordinates: 16.636540°N 75.387910°E
- Country: India
- State: Karnataka
- District: Bagalkot
- Talukas: Jamkhandi

Government
  - Body: Village Panchayat

Languages
  - Official: Kannada
- Time zone: UTC+5:30 (IST)
- Postal code: 586126
- Vehicle registration: KA 48
- Nearest city: Jamkhandi
- Civic agency: Village Panchayat

Adihudi is a village in the southern state of Karnataka, India. It is located in the Jamkhandi taluk of Bagalkot district in Karnataka.

== See also ==
- Bagalkot
- Districts of Karnataka
