= Alagur =

Terdal
- village
- Location in Karnataka, India Terdal (India)
- Coordinates: 16.7000°N 76.3499°E
- Country: India
- State: Karnataka
- District: Bagalkot
- Talukas: Jamkhandi

Population (2001)
  - Total: 7,034

Languages
  - Official: Kannada
- Time zone: UTC+5:30 (IST)
- PIN: 587301
- Nearest city: Jamkhandi, Bijapur

Terdal is a village in the southern state of Karnataka, India. It is located in the Jamkhandi taluk of Bagalkot district in Karnataka.

== Demographics ==
As of 2001 India census, Alagur had a population of 7034 with 3606 males and 3428 females.

== See also ==
- Bagalkot
- Districts of Karnataka
