= Kandgal =

- village
- Location in Karnataka, India Kandgal (India)
- Coordinates: 15.9568°N 76.2734°E
- Country: India
- State: Karnataka
- District: Bagalkot
- Talukas: Hungund

Population (2001)
  - Total: 5,728

Languages
  - Official: Kannada
- Time zone: UTC+5:30 (IST)

Kandgal is a village in the northern state of Karnataka, India. It is located in the Hungund taluk of Bagalkot district in Karnataka.

== Demographics ==
As of 2001 India census, Kandgal had a population of 5728 with 2874 males and 2854 females.

== See also ==
- Bagalkot
- Districts of Karnataka
