= Murugappa Channaveerappa Modi =

Indian surgeon

Murigeppa Channaveerappa Modi
- Born: 4 October 1916; Bilagi, Bagalkot District, Kingdom of Mysuru, British India
- Died: 11 November 2005 (aged 89); Bengaluru
- Education: Bachelor of Medicine and Bachelor of Surgery; Master of Surgery
- Alma mater: New York University, Columbia University
- Occupation: Ophthalmologist
- Spouse(s): Smt. Yilavathi (-2005)
- Awards: Padma Bhushan (1968); Padma Shri (1956); Karnataka Rajyotsava award (1966)
Murigeppa Channaveerappa Modi
Member of the Karnataka Legislative Council
- (Nominated)
- In office 1990–1996
Personal details
- Party: Nomination

Murigeppa Channaveerappa Modi often referred by his initials, M. C. Modi (4 October 1916 – 11 November 2005) was an Indian ophthalmologist and eye surgeon.

== Qualifications ==
Modi was an Eye surgeon who performed a record half-a-million (more than five-lakh) eye surgeries. He travelled to remote villages and towns of India to hold mass eye camps. He was known for his dexterity as a surgeon and diagnostic acumen.He Studied DAM from Kankanwadi Ayurvedic College Belagavi, Karnataka.

== Early life and education ==
He was born in Bilagi in Bagalkot district, But his early education was in Jamakhandi at P B Highschool Jamakhandi.He is an alumnus of KLE's Shri B M Kankanawadi Ayurved Mahavidyalaya Belgaum formerly which was taken by KLE Society in 1993 ."Born of humble parentage – a Kannadiga from Bijapur district – Modi threw away a lucrative career in private practice after attending Gandhiji's historic prayer meeting at Bombay on August 8, 1942 where the Quit India resolution was passed. That meeting changed his life. And Modi, the gifted ophthalmologist, dedicated his life to the sightless."I felt affected when I saw blind people begging. They just did not have money to go to doctors." Modi recalled.". It is also claimed that he heard the life-changing Gandhi's speech at Beelagi, a village near Bijapur, in 1942.

== Career ==
He was the pioneer of mass eye surgery in India. He being an Ayurvedic surgeon The Guinness Book of World Records lists Modi as the "most dedicated doctor," for performing the highest number of eye surgeries. He performed as many as 833 cataract operations in one day. He visited 46,120 villages and 12,118,630 patients, and performed a total of 610,564 operations to February 1993."When my time comes I would like to disappear silently"he concluded.He meant that when death comes to him he would accept it wholeheartedly and die without troubling anyone with all the good and bad he did.

"Between his first camp held in 1943 at Pattan in Gujarat until his death in 2005, Murugappa Channaveerappa Modi examined over 10 million people and conducted over 7.8 lakh cataract surgeries with funds from philanthropists and donors." In 1980, Dr. Modi set up the M.C. Modi Charitable Eye Hospital in Mahalakshmipuram: initially functioning as camp-based eye hospital, it treated thousands of poor and needy patients with eye ailments over the years, and is now a super-speciality eye hospital. Today, the hospital is headed by his son, Amarnath Modi.

"In an assembly line fashion, Modi operates 40 patients an hour, attending to four patients at a time. Ambidextrous, he performs delicate eye surgeries with his left hand. He does cataract operations, squint corrections and cornea transplants. Earlier, Modi used to perform 600 to 700 operations a day in his camps. But now in Karnataka, he operates on 200 to 300 patients every day."

Modi was a nominated member of the Karnataka Legislative Council for a term in the 1990s.

Modi set out to hold eye camps in the then Bombay State, which included parts of Karnataka. He travelled to remote villages and towns to hold camps, often with very little financial or medical support. He mobilised support from local voluntary organisations and people. He also received assistance from India and abroad for his mission. Those operated upon were being given spectacles free of cost.

== Awards ==
- Padma Shri in 1956
- Padma Bhushan in 1968

The government of India has awarded him with its highest awards of the Padma Shree and Padma Bhushan. Helen Keller, the blind and deaf-mute American author, it is said, attended one of his camps in 1954, and asked him: "Have you insured your hands?" It is believed that through his mass eye camps, he has conducted 579,000 operations, and has examined over 5,000,000 (5 million) patients and given free food to over 10,000,000 (10 million) persons.

Modi appeared in the Guinness Book of World Records in the year 1986, for performing 833 eye operations in a day, the highest in the world. These operations were conducted in Tirupati in 1968 over 14 continuous hours. He was fondly called "Modi, Kannukota anna", the brother who gave vision, by people in his native state Karnataka. This anna has performed all the eye operations free of cost.
