= Kamatagi =

Kamatagi (ಕಮತಗಿ) Kamathagi
- Pattana Panchayat
- Location in Karnataka, India Kamatagi (ಕಮತಗಿ) (India)
- Coordinates: 16.1190°N 75.8482°E
- Country: India
- State: Karnataka
- District: Bagalkot
- Talukas: Hungund

Population (2001)
  - Total: 14,380

Languages
  - Official: Kannada
- Time zone: UTC+5:30 (IST)
- Postal code: 587120

Kamatagi is a town in the northern state of Karnataka, India. It is located in the Hungund taluk of Bagalkot district in Karnataka.

== Demographics ==
As of 2001 India census, Kamatagi had a population of 14,380 with 7,261 males and 7,119 females.

- Bagalkot
- https://web.archive.org/web/20150103152428/http://ravichandragroup.in/
- Districts of Karnataka
