= Yaragoppa =

- Village
- Country: India
- State: Karnataka
- District: Bagalkot
- Talukas: Badami

Languages
  - Official: Kannada
- Time zone: UTC+5:30 (IST)

Yaragoppa is a village in Bagalkot district in the southern state of Karnataka, India.
