= Hirepadasalgi =

Hirepadasalgi Gandhi award village
- village
- Location in Karnataka, India Hirepadasalgi (India)
- Coordinates: 16.5940°N 75.3867°E
- Country: India
- State: Karnataka
- District: Bagalkot
- Talukas: Jamkhandi

Government
  - Type: village panchyat
  - Body: GOREKHAN

Population (2001)
  - Total: 5,906

Languages
  - Official: Kannada Hindi
- Time zone: UTC+5:30 (IST)

Hirepadasalgi is a village in the northern state of Karnataka, India. It is located in the Jamkhandi taluk of Bagalkot district in Karnataka.

== Demographics ==
As of 2001 India census, Hirepadasalgi had a population of 5906 with 3118 males and 2788 females.

== See also ==
- Bagalkot
- Districts of Karnataka
