= Chimmad =

- village
- Location in Karnataka, India Chimmad (India)
- Coordinates: 16°25′33″N 75°06′45″E
- Country: India
- State: Karnataka
- District: Bagalkot
- Taluk: Jamkhandi

Government
  - Type: State govt of karnataka

Population (2011)
  - Total: 10,717

Languages
  - Official: Kannada
- Time zone: UTC+5:30 (IST)

Chimmad is a village in the southern state of Karnataka, India. It is located in the Jamkhandi taluk of Bagalkot district in 𝐊𝐚𝐫𝐧𝐚𝐭𝐚𝐤𝐚. 𝐈𝐭 𝐢𝐬 𝐛𝐢𝐠 𝐯𝐢𝐥𝐥𝐚𝐠𝐞 𝐢𝐧 𝐑𝐚𝐛𝐤𝐚𝐯𝐢 - 𝐁𝐚𝐧𝐡𝐚𝐭𝐭𝐢 𝐭𝐚𝐥𝐮𝐤. 𝐓𝐡𝐢𝐬 𝐯𝐢𝐥𝐥𝐚𝐠𝐞 𝐢𝐬 𝐚𝐥𝐬𝐨 𝐟𝐚𝐦𝐨𝐮𝐬 𝐢𝐧 𝐍𝐨𝐫𝐭𝐡 𝐊𝐚𝐫𝐧𝐚𝐭𝐚𝐤𝐚 𝐟𝐨𝐫 𝐊𝐢𝐜𝐡𝐚𝐝𝐢 𝐣𝐚𝐭𝐫𝐚

== Demographics ==
In the 2001 India census, Chimmad had a population of 8,721 with 4,390 males and 4,331 females.

In the 2011 census, Chimmad reported a population of 10,717.

== See also ==
- Bagalkot
- Districts of Karnataka
