= Bidari =

- village
- Location in Karnataka, India Bidari (India)
- Coordinates: 16.5264°N 75.4586°E
- Country: India
- State: Karnataka
- District: Bagalkot
- Talukas: Jamkhandi

Population (2001)
  - Total: 10,478

Languages
  - Official: Kannada
- Time zone: UTC+5:30 (IST)
- Postal code: 586125

Bidari is a village in the southern state of Karnataka, India. It is located in the Jamkhandi taluk of Bagalkot district in Karnataka.

== Demographics ==
As of 2010 India census, Bidari had a population of 10478 with 4733 males and 4745 females. It is the last village of Jamkhandi taluk towards the north east. The village is surrounded by the Krishna River on three sides. Agriculture is the main occupation of the village residents. Sugar cane is the chief crop grown here. There are 4 to 5 sugar factories nearby.

== See also ==
- Shankar Bidari
