= Bennur =

Bennur may refer to several places in India:

== Karnataka ==
- Bennur, Bagalkot
- Bennur, Belgaum
- Bennur, Dharwad
