= Sasalatti =

- village
- Location in Karnataka, India Sasalatti (India)
- Coordinates: 16.4681°N 75.0078°E
- Country: India
- State: Karnataka
- District: Bagalkot
- Talukas: Jamkhandi

Population (2011)
  - Total: 8,226

Languages
  - Official: Kannada
- Time zone: UTC+5:30 (IST)

Sasalatti is a village in the southern state of Karnataka, India. It is located in the Jamkhandi taluk of Bagalkot district in Karnataka.

== Demographics ==
As of 2001 India census, Sasalatti had a population of 7338 with 3790 males and 3548 females.

== See also ==
- Bagalkot
- Districts of Karnataka
