= Dhavaleshwar =

Village in Karnataka, India

- village
- Location in Karnataka, India Dhavaleshwar (India)
- Coordinates: 16°20′11″N 75°04′40″E
- Country: India
- State: Karnataka
- District: Bagalkot
- Taluka: Mahalingpur

Population (2011)
  - Total: 7,300

Languages
  - Official: Kannada
- Time zone: UTC+5:30 (IST)
- Postal code: 587312
- ISO 3166 code: IN-KA

Dhavaleshwar is a village in the southern state of Karnataka, India. It is located in the Mahalingpur taluk of Bagalkot district in Karnataka. Dhavaleshwar is located on the bank of Ghataprabha river. The river bifurcates the Belgaum and Bagalkot districts. Just on the other side of the river, there is one more village which, is also known as Dhavaleshwar. This Dhavaleshwar belongs to Gokak Taluk of Belgaum district. Many politicians promised to build a bridge between both villages, but no one has initiated. The villagers grow sugar cane, which is the source of their income.

== Demographics ==
As of 2001 India census, Dhavaleshwar had a population of 5,578, with 2,818 males and 2,760 females.

In the 2011 census, the population of Dhavaleshwar was reported as 7,300.

== See also ==
- Bagalkot
- Districts of Karnataka
