= Jalihal =

- village
- Location in Karnataka, India Jalihal (India)
- Coordinates: 15.8422°N 75.7577°E
- Country: India
- State: Karnataka
- District: Bagalkot
- Talukas: Badami

Government
  - Body: Gram panchayat

Population (2001)
  - Total: 5,169

Languages
  - Official: Kannada
- Time zone: UTC+5:30 (IST)
- ISO 3166 code: IN-KA
- Vehicle registration: KA
- Website: karnataka.gov.in

Jalihal is a village in the southern state of Karnataka, India. It is located in the Badami taluk of Bagalkot district in Karnataka.

== Demographics ==
As of 2001 India census, Jalihal had a population of 5169 with 2624 males and 2545 females.

== See also ==
- Bagalkot
- Districts of Karnataka
