= Belagali =

RannaBelagali
- village
- Location in Karnataka, India RannaBelagali (India)
- Coordinates: 16°23′07″N 75°08′58″E
- Country: India
- State: Karnataka
- District: Bagalkot
- Taluka: Mudhol

Government
  - Type: Panchayat raj
  - Body: Pattan panchayat

Population (2020)
  - Total: 25,175
- Time zone: UTC+5:30 (IST)
- Postal code: 587113
- ISO 3166 code: IN-KA
- Vehicle registration: KA48
- Website: https://www.instagram.com/rannabelagali

RannaBelagali is a Pattan Panchayat Town in the southern state of Karnataka, India. It is located in the Mudhol taluka of Bagalkot district in Karnataka

== Demographics ==
As of 2001 India census, RannaBelagali had a population of 15,041, with 7,582 males and 7,459 females.

In the 2011 census, the population of RannaBelagali was reported as 17,175.

== See also ==
- Districts of Karnataka
