= Baragi =

Baragi may refer to:

- Baragi, Bagalkot, India
- Barağı, Keşan, Turkey
