= Jeeragal =

Coordinates: 16.2913482°N 75.3113651°E

Jeeragal is a small village in Mudhol, district Bagalkot, Karnataka, India.
