= Nawanagar =

Nawanagar may refer to:

- Nawanagar, Bihar, a village in Buxur district, Bihar, India
- Jamnagar, city in Gujarat, India, known as Nawanagar in 1920s
  - Nawanagar State, a former princely state in Gujarat, India

== See also ==
- Navanagar, a planned new city in Karnataka, India
