= Shurpali =

- Village
- Location in Karnataka, India
- Coordinates: 16.504672°N 75.291401°E
- Country: India
- State: Karnataka
- District: Bagalkot
- Elevation: 543 m (1,781 ft)

Languages
  - Official: Kannada
- Time zone: UTC+5:30 (IST)
- Telephone code: 08353
- Vehicle registration: KA-48

Shurpali is a village near Jamkhandi, a town in Bagalkot district in the Indian state of Karnataka.

== History ==
The village of Shurpali or ‘Shurpalaya’ houses Shri Lakshmi Narasimha swamy temple and is situated amidst cane fields on the bank of river Krishna. The ancient temple of Shri LakShmI Narasimha has references in skanda purana. There is an Ashwattha vruksha in front of the main deity.

The puranas say that on seeing "the beauty of Shurpalaya", the tears of joy of Lord Parashurama that fell on the ground here gave birth to a Peepal tree (Ashvattha vruksha). Mother Bhageerathi (river Ganga) is said to have come here to give ‘Shurpa Daana’ (Morada-Baagina) to a Brahman to get rid of her sins. Hence the name ‘Shurpalaya’.

The place is also referred to as ‘Dakshina-Kashi’, owing to the Shiva temples and 8 terthas around the area.

The village of Shurpali was the ‘Tapobhumi’ of Shri Yadavaryaru. There is also 'Anjaneya' installed by 1008 Shri Vidyadhisha Teertharu in the temple.

== Demographics ==
As of the 2011 population census, Shurpali had a population of 3114 of which 1598 are males while 1516 are females. Children between the age of 0-6 made up 16.9% of the total village population. The Average Sex Ratio of Shurpali village is 949 which is lower than Karnataka state average of 973. Child Sex Ratio for Shurpali as per census is 920, lower than Karnataka average of 948. Shurpali has lower literacy rate compared to Karnataka.

In 2011 literacy rate of Shurpali was 66.25% compared to 75.36% of Karnataka. The Male literacy stands at 76.66% while Female literacy was 55.33%.
