= Achanur =

- Village
- Location in Karnataka, India Achanur (India)
- Coordinates: 16.2358000°N 75.827000°E
- Country: India
- State: Karnataka
- District: Bagalkot
- Talukas: Bagalkot

Government
  - Body: Village Panchayat

Languages
  - Official: Kannada
- Time zone: UTC+5:30 (IST)
- PIN code: 587111
- Nearest city: Bagalkot
- Civic agency: Village Panchayat

Achanur is a village in the southern state of Karnataka, India. It is located in the Bagalkot taluk of Bagalkot district in Karnataka.

Achanur is around 20 Kilometers from Bagalkot Town.

== Annual Programs in Temple ==
From :Yugadi padya (ಯುಗಾದಿ ಪಾಡ್ಯ) to Hanum Jayanti : Daily 'special Pooja' and Anna prasad.

On the day of 'Hanum Jayanti' : Pavamana Homa (ಹೋಮಾ), Satyanarayan Pooja and Rathotsava.

== See also ==
- Bagalkot
- Districts of Karnataka
