= Gudura =

- village
- Location in Karnataka, India Gudura (India)
- Coordinates: 15.9394°N 75.9146°E
- Country: India
- State: Karnataka
- District: Bagalkot

Languages
  - Official: Kannada
- Time zone: UTC+5:30 (IST)
- PIN: 587202

Gudura is a village in Bagalkot district in Karnataka.
