= Savalagi =

- village
- Location in Karnataka, India Savalagi (India)
- Coordinates: 16.6710°N 75.3515°E
- Country: India
- State: Karnataka
- District: Bagalkot
- Taluka: Jamkhandi

Government
  - Body: Gram panchayat

Area
  - Total: 48 km^{2} (19 sq mi)
- Elevation: 559 m (1,834 ft)

Population (2011)
  - Total: 12,506
  - Density: 263/km^{2} (680/sq mi)

Languages
  - Official: Kannada
- Time zone: UTC+5:30 (IST)
- PIN: 586126
- ISO 3166 code: IN-KA

Savalagi is a village in the southern state of Karnataka, India, It is located in the Jamkhandi taluk of Bagalkot district in Karnataka, it is the birthplace of B. D. Jatti former Vice President of India, also served the Chief Minister of Mysore, Governor of Odisha.

== Demographics ==
As of 2001 India census, Savalagi had a population of 9623 with 4981 males and 4642 females.

== See also ==
- Bagalkot
- Districts of Karnataka
