= Amarawati =

Panchayat village in Hunagunda, Karnataka, India

Amarawati is a panchayat village in Hungund Taluka, Bagalkot district, in Karnataka State of India.

There are five villages in Amarawati gram panchayat: Amarawati, Hungund (Rural), Ramawadgi, Timmapur, and Virapur.
