= Gothe =

Gothe ಗೋಠೆ
- village
- Location in Karnataka, India Gothe (India)
- Coordinates: 16.7225°N 75.4326°E
- Country: India
- State: Karnataka
- District: Bagalkot
- Talukas: Jamakhandi

Government
  - Type: Panchayati Raj
  - Body: Gram Panchayat

Area
  - Total: 49 km^{2} (19 sq mi)
- Elevation: 559 m (1,834 ft)

Population (2011)
  - Total: 5,357 (Males−2,735 Females−2,622)
  - Density: 109/km^{2} (280/sq mi)

Languages
  - Official: Kannada
  - Other languages: Hindi, Marathi
- Time zone: UTC+5:30 (IST)
- PIN: 587330
- Vehicle registration: KA 48

Gothe village is located in Jamakhandi taluka of Bagalkot district in Karnataka, India. It is situated 37 km away from sub-district headquarter Jamakhandi and 117 km away from district headquarter Bagalkot. Vijayapura is the nearest city to Gothe which is approximately 36 km away.

== Demographics ==
Area:

The total geographical area of Gothe village is 49 km^{2} or 4926.32 hectares. By area it is the 3rd biggest village in Jamakhandi sub-district.

Population:

Total 1013 families residing in the village and an average 5 persons live in every family. The Gothe village is the 21st most populous village in the sub-district with population of 5,357 of which 2,735 are males while 2,622 are females as per Population Census 2011. Average Sex Ratio of Gothe village is 959 which is lower than Karnataka state average of 973. One of the notable Acharya of the Dwaita philosophy Shri. Gothe Narasimha Acharya of Shri Uttaradhi Mutt hails from here.

Literacy:

Gothe village has lower literacy rate compared to Karnataka. In 2011, literacy rate of Gothe village was 61.22% compared to 75.36% of Karnataka. In Gothe Male literacy stands at 69.72% while female literacy rate was 52.34%.

== See also ==
- Bagalkot
- Districts of Karnataka
