= Hebballi, Bagalkot =

Hebballi, Bagalakote Hebballi
- village
- Location in Karnataka, India Hebballi, Bagalakote (India)
- Coordinates: 15.8394°N 75.6106°E
- Country: India
- State: Karnataka
- District: Bagalkot

Languages
  - Official: Kannada
- Time zone: UTC+5:30 (IST)

Hebballi is a village in Bagalkot district in Karnataka.
