= Ibrahim Sutar =

Indian social worker and singer (1940–2022)

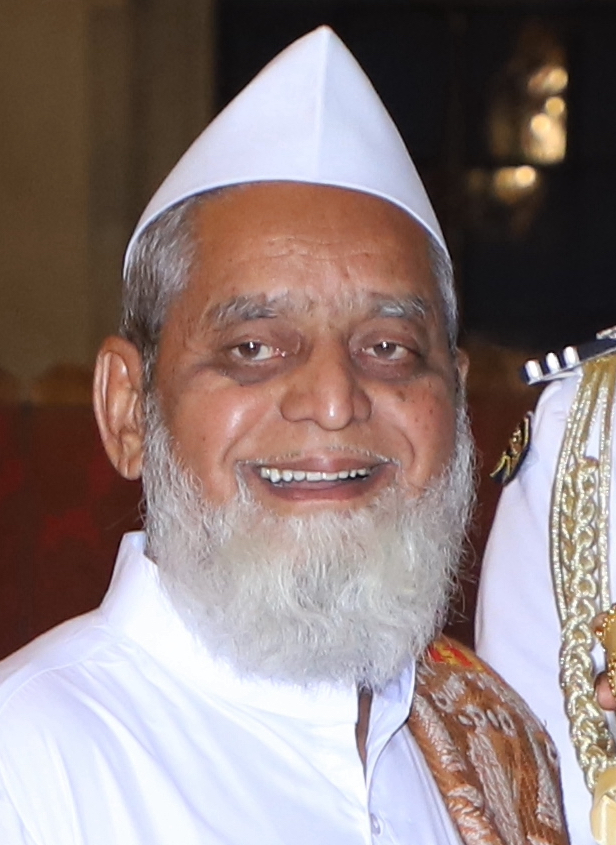
- Sutar in 2018
- Born: 10 May 1940; Mahalingpur, British Raj
- Died: 5 February 2022 (aged 81); Mahalingpur, Karnataka, India
- Citizenship: Indian
- Occupation: Weaver
- Website: www.ibrahimsutar.com

Ibrahim Sutar (10 May 1940 – 5 February 2022) was an Indian social worker and poet known for folk-music performances across Karnataka and neighboring states which spread the message of Hindu–Muslim communal unity.

Sutar received the Padma Shri, India's fourth highest civilian honor, in 2018 and the Karnataka government's Rajyotsava award in 1995. For his contributions, he was called Kannada Kabir or Karnataka's Kabir (ಕನ್ನಡ ಕಬೀರ or ಕರ್ನಾಟಕದ ಕಬೀರ).

== Early life ==
Ibrahim was born in Mahalingpur (in the present day Bagalkote district of Karnataka) on 10 May 1940 to Nabisaheb and Aminabi, in a family with limited financial means. His parents worked as carpenters and as weavers. He dropped out of school at third grade to work as an assistant to a weaver. During this time, he attended sermons at the Basavananda Swami Mutt and also participated in the bhajans at a nearby temple.

== Career ==
Sutar started his career as a Harikatha singer, going around towns and villages in Karnataka and neighboring states. He would deliver spiritual discourses, perform stage shows, and sing devotional songs. The stories were drawn from both Hindu and Muslim scriptures, carrying themes of communal unity and harmony as well as ethics.

In the year 1970 he set up the Bhavaikyate Bhajana Mela (transl. Harmony Folk Music Melā) team of artists and started performing devotional singing and spiritual discourses across Karnataka and neighboring states. Along with the artists, he toured the country spreading messages of Hindu Muslim communal unity.

As a polyglot folk singer, singing in both Kannada and Urdu, Sutar was called Kannada Kabir or Karnataka's Kabir (ಕನ್ನಡ ಕಬೀರ or ಕರ್ನಾಟಕದ ಕಬೀರ), in reference to the 15th century Indian poet and saint, Kabir. He was also a public speaker who visited various schools and colleges in the state as well as various Lingayat Mathas speaking on vachana and dasa literature. His performances were usually in question-and-answer format; songs about dasa saints and vachana sahitya (transl. Vachana literature) were interspersed throughout. Most of the questions would have spiritual connotations, and his sermons would draw from the Ramayana, Mahabharata, and various Islamic scriptures. He was known to have been well read in both the Bhagavad Gita and the Quran. In addition to touring across the breadth of Karnataka, he traveled across other states in the country including Andhra Pradesh, Maharashtra, Goa, Rajasthan, Delhi, and Odisha.

He also made television appearances that included the Zee Kannada show Drama Juniors.

=== Awards and honors ===
- Padma Shri for arts and music in 2018.
- Karnataka State Rajyotsava Award in the year 1995.

== Personal life ==
Sutar was married to Marembi with whom he had three children – two daughters and a son. He died from a heart attack in Mahalingpur, in the Bagalkote district of Karnataka, on 5 February 2022, at the age of 81. He had been ailing from diabetes and hypertension. The Karnataka state government announced a state funeral.
