= Vajjaramatti =

Coordinates: 16.2916983°N 75.3755545°E

Vajjaramatti is a small village in Mudhol, district Bagalkot, Karnataka, India.
