= Jagadal =

- village
- Location in Karnataka, India Jagadal (India)
- Coordinates: 16.4691°N 75.1619°E
- Country: India
- State: Karnataka
- District: Bagalkot
- Taluka: Rabakavi-Banahatti

Population (2001)
  - Total: 5,998

Languages
  - Official: Kannada
- Time zone: UTC+5:30 (IST)
- Postal code: 587311

Jagadal is a village in the southern state of Karnataka, India. It is located in the Rabakavi-Banahatti taluk of Bagalkot district in Karnataka. Large number of people depend upon banana sell

== Demographics ==
As of 2001 India census, Jagadal had a population of 5998 with 3044 males and 2954 females.

== See also ==
- Bagalkot
- Districts of Karnataka
