= Bilkerur =

- village
- Country: India
- State: Karnataka
- District: Bagalkot

Population (2011)
  - Total: 1,760

Languages
  - Official: Kannada
- Time zone: UTC+5:30 (IST)

Bilkerur is a village in the southern state of Karnataka, India. It is located in the Bagalkot taluk of Bagalkot district.
