= Basavanagar =

Coordinates: 17°33′N 76°14′E

- village
- Location in Karnataka, India Basavanagar (Karnataka)
- Country: India
- State: Karnataka
- District: Bagalkot

Population (2011)
  - Total: 81

Languages
  - Official: Kannada
- Time zone: UTC+5:30 (IST)

Basavanagar is a village in the southern state of Karnataka, India. It is located in the Bagalkot taluk of Bagalkot district.
