= Jaliberi =

Coordinates: 16.3197636°N 75.243414°E

Jaliberi is a small village in Mudhol, district Bagalkot, Karnataka, India. Jaliberi is about distance of 5–6 km from Mudhol (which is Taluk and famous for high breed quality dogs). Agriculture is the main occupation of the people in jaliberi, river Ghatapraba is main source of water for irrigation in this region. Wheat, Sugarcane and jowar are the main crops grown. People celebrate a festival called as Hanumanthana (lord hanuman) Okali in the month of May (after completion of basava jayanthi) and Kaarthi in the month of December. A lot of cultural programs will be held during this period. This village still needs improvement in terms of transportation and hospitals.
