= Anadinni =

Village in Karnataka

Anadinni ಆನದಿನ್ನಿ
- village
- Country: India
- State: Karnataka
- District: Bagalkot

Population (2011)
  - Total: 2,182

Languages
  - Official: Kannada
- Time zone: UTC+5:30 (IST)
- PIN: 587102

Anadinni is a village in the southern state of Karnataka, India. It is located in the Bagalkot taluk of Bagalkot district. It falls under the jurisdiction of Yadahalli Gram Panchayat and the Bagalkot Block Panchayat. It is situated 17km away from Bagalkot district headquarters.
