= Sutar (surname) =

Sutar may be a surname. Notable people with the surname include:

- Chinmay Sutar (born 1997), Indian cricketer
- Chittaranjan Sutar (1928–2002), Bangladeshi politician
- Ibrahim Sutar (1940–2022), Indian social worker and poet
- Prasad Sutar, Indian visual effects designer
- Ram V. Sutar (1925–2025), Indian sculptor
- Shashikant Sutar, Indian politician

== See also ==
- Suthar
