= Old Channal =

Village in Karnataka, India

Coordinates: 16.3275554°N 75.1866035°E

Old Channal is a small village in Mahalingpur, district Bagalkot, Karnataka, India. It is located near the village of Channal.
