= Uttur =

Coordinates: 16.319985°N 75.2232706°E

Uttur is a small village in Mudhol, district Bagalkot, Karnataka, India.
