= Belura, Bagalakote =

Belura, Bagalakote Belura
- village
- Location in Karnataka, India Belura, Bagalakote (India)
- Coordinates: 15.8476°N 75.7528°E
- Country: India
- State: Karnataka
- District: Bagalkot

Languages
  - Official: Kannada
- Time zone: UTC+5:30 (IST)
- PIN: 587114

Belura is a village in Bagalkot district in Karnataka.
