= Rugi, Bagalkot =

Coordinates: 16.3003227°N 75.2756864°E

Rugi is a small village in Mudhol, district Bagalkot, Karnataka, India. Its population in the 2011 census was 2,467.
