= Mirji =

Coordinates: 16.3153334°N 75.1562583°E

Mirji is a village in Mudhol, district Bagalkot, Karnataka, India. It has 2490 inhabitants.
