= Paolo Litta =

Italian composer

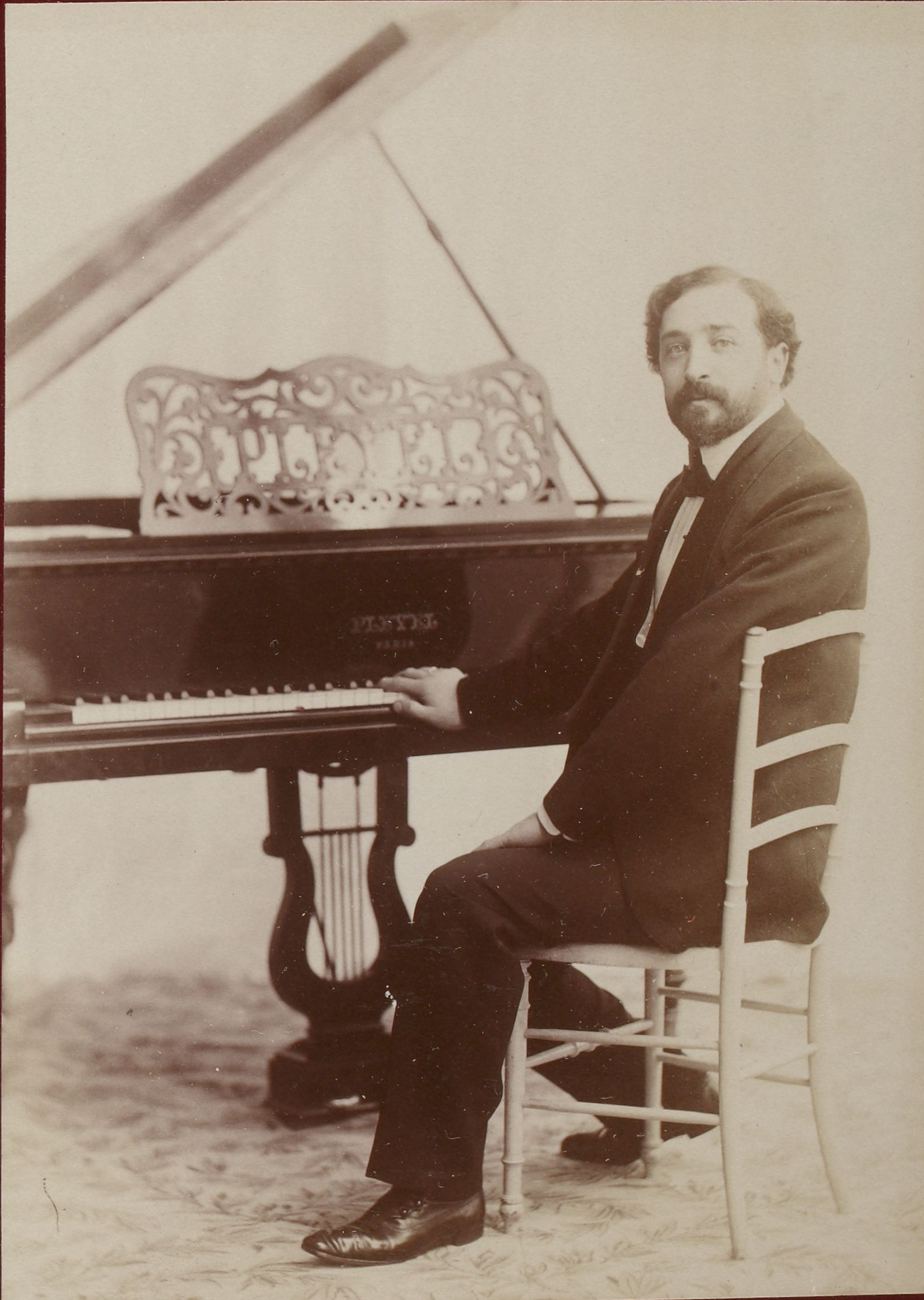

Paolo Litta (7 May 1871, Stockholm – 8 May 1931, Fiesole) was an Italian composer. He was of mixed Italian and Swedish heritage. He was married to the Italian opera singer, Ida Isori (Note: As stated by Richard Batka, Paolo Litta described Ida Isori and her role as a bel canto singer in a form of proses by Gothe: Celle-ci a beaucoup appris; Elle nous enseignera à son tour les secrets de son art (She learned a lot; She will in turn teach us the secrets of her art).), and dedicated the work, Le Lac d’Amour, to her. Litta was known for having a dispute with Valentine de Saint-Point on the possibility that some ideas in de Saint-Point's La Métachorie were copied from his work, la Déesse Nue. Relatively unknown even in Italian records such as the supplementary material for Dizionario Universale dei Musicisti by Carlo Schmidl, La Morte di Cleopatra was his noticeable work to the public until his death.

== Compositions ==
- La Déesse Nue (in addition to a separate book describing the musical work)
- Le Lac d'Amour
- La Morte di Cleopatra
- Der Tod als Fiedler
