= Nagaral =

Village in India

Nagaral(ನಾಗರಾಳ) is a village in the southern state of Karnataka, India. It is located in the Bilagi taluk of Bagalkot district in Karnataka. It is about 35 kilometres (22 mi) from the district headquarters of Bagalkot town and is about 5 kilometres (3.1 mi) from taluka headquarters of Bilagi and on the left bank of the Krishna River. It is famous for the Digamabareshwara temple and well educated persons.

== Demographics ==
As of 2001 India census, Nagaral had a population of 3,329 with 1,668 males and 1,661 females as per the 2001 census.

== See also ==
- Bagalkot
- Districts of Karnataka
