= Dammooru, Hunagunda =

Dammooru Dammur
- Village
- Location within Karnataka Location within India
- Coordinates: 15°55′50″N 75°57′44″E
- Country: India
- State: Karnataka
- District: Bagalkot district
- Taluk: Hungund

Population (2001)
  - Total: 1,494

Languages
  - Official: Kannada
- Time zone: UTC+5:30 (IST)
- Vehicle registration: KA XX

Dammooru (also spelled as Dammur) is a village in the Hungund taluk of Bagalkot district in the Indian state of Karnataka.

== Demographics ==
As of 2001 India census, Dammooru had a population of 1,494 with 755 males and 739 females and 243 Households.

== Importance ==
Dammooru is famous for the ancient Dammur fort and natural waterfalls.

== See also ==
- Kudalasangama
- Badami
- Hungund
- Bagalkot
- Karnataka
