= Tappasakatti =

- village
- Location in Karnataka, India Tappasakatti (India)
- Coordinates: 15.9434°N 75.5206°E
- Country: India
- State: Karnataka
- District: Bagalkot

Languages
  - Official: Kannada
- Time zone: UTC+5:30 (IST)

Tappasakatti is a village in Bagalkot district in Karnataka.
