= Sirur =

- village
- Location in Karnataka, India Sirur (India)
- Coordinates: 16.0965°N 75.7858°E
- Country: India
- State: Karnataka
- District: Bagalkot
- Talukas: Bagalkot

Government
  - Body: Gram panchayat

Population (2001)
  - Total: 11,163

Languages
  - Official: Kannada
- Time zone: UTC+5:30 (IST)
- ISO 3166 code: IN-KA
- Vehicle registration: KA
- Website: karnataka.gov.in

Sirur is a village in the northern state of Karnataka, India. It is located in the Bagalkot taluk of Bagalkot district in Karnataka.

== Demographics ==
As of 2001 India census, Sirur had a population of 11163 with 5660 males and 5503 females.

== See also ==
- Bagalkot
- Districts of Karnataka
