= Agasarakoppa =

- village
- Interactive map of Agasarakoppa
- Coordinates: 13.9368°N 75.0532°E
- Country: India
- State: Karnataka
- District: Bagalkot
- Talukas: Badami

Government
  - Body: Village Panchayat

Languages
  - Official: Kannada
- Time zone: UTC+5:30 (IST)
- Nearest city: Bagalkot
- Civic agency: Village Panchayat

Agasarakoppa is a village in the southern Indian state of Karnataka, in Badami, a taluk of Bagalkot district.

== See also ==
- Bagalkot
- Districts of Karnataka
