= Amalazari =

Coordinates: 16°22′56″N 75°24′22″E

Amalazari is a village in Taluka Bilagi, district Bagalkot, in the state of Karnataka in India. The population of the village was 4011 as of 20 January 2017. Major occupation of the village is agricultural production. Amalazari was named as one of the most developed villages in Vijayapura and Bagalkot areas. The village of Amalazari is 15 km east of Mudhol and 70 km south of Vijayapura. The village has a primary school and a high school. The village is dominated by the Hindu community. The literacy rate is 90%. Mudhol is the nearest town to Amalazari.
