= Kittali =

- village
- Location in Karnataka, India Kittali (India)
- Coordinates: 15.8415°N 75.5448°E
- Country: India
- State: Karnataka
- District: Bagalkot

Government
  - Type: Panchayat raj
  - Body: Gram panchayat

Languages
  - Official: Kannada
- Time zone: UTC+5:30 (IST)
- ISO 3166 code: IN-KA
- Vehicle registration: KA
- Website: karnataka.gov.in

Kittali is a village in Bagalkot district in Karnataka.
