= Badagandi =

Village in Karnataka, India

Badagandi is a village of Bilgi taluk, Bagalkot district, Karnataka. Badagandi is located 2.5 km from Bilgi city The village is on the NH218

Badagandi is having an international standards school named 'Bapuji international education trust' Village also surrounded by a Sugar mill known as 'Bilgi Sugars' The main dependency of people is on cultivation Badagandi is famous for BIS school that is bapuji international school having creative faculty facilitated by academy of creative teaching, bangalore. The school is having all the facilities with residential campus at badagandi. Badagandi is having a historical background with a well towards bilgi or west side of village, known as 'Hire bavi' (older or big well) which is containing an inscript on its wall. and village also having around 6 Hindu temples inside the village and a mosque in its north towards Bijapur road.
