= Shri Parvatesh =

Shri Parvatesh Parvati
- Village
- Location in Karnataka, India Shri Parvatesh (India)
- Coordinates: 16°2′24″N 75°47′21″E
- Country: India
- State: Karnataka
- District: Bagalkot

Languages
  - Official: Kannada
- Time zone: UTC+5:30 (IST)

Parvati is a village 1.5 km from Guledagudd in the Bagalkot district in the Indian state of Karnataka. Shri Parvatesh is the name of Hanuman god whose temple is at Parvati village.

== Annual Festival ==
Every year in December, all Parvatesh devotees gather and organise a two-day festival, the date of which is decided in the evening on Dushera at the temple by the Shri Parvatesh organising committee.

The main attraction of this event is the women who serve Shri Parvatesh by walking over the fire, an act known as "Gandarati". This is performed to seek the blessings of Shri Parvatesh.
