= Killa Hosakoti =

Killa Hosakoti is a village in Bagalkot district in the southern state of Karnataka, India.
