= Baragi, Bagalkot =

Coordinates: 16.2870023°N 75.3663504°E

Baragi is a village in Mudhol, Bagalkot district, Karnataka, India. It is 10 km away from the taluka headquarters and 38 km away from the district headquarters of Bagalkot.
