= Jalihala =

- village
- Location in Karnataka, India Jalihala (India)
- Coordinates: 15.8417°N 75.76°E
- Country: India
- State: Karnataka
- District: Bagalkot

Languages
  - Official: Kannada
- Time zone: UTC+5:30 (IST)

Jalihala is a village in Bagalkot district in Karnataka, India.
