= Mugalkhod =

Mugalakhod
- Village
- Location in Karnataka, India Mugalakhod (India)
- Coordinates: 16.3759°N 75.2081°E
- Country: India
- State: Karnataka
- District: Belagavi
- Talukas: Raybag

Government
  - Type: Panchayat raj
  - Body: Pur sabhe

Population (2001)
  - Total: 7,168

Languages
  - Official: Kannada
- Time zone: UTC+5:30 (IST)
- ISO 3166 code: IN-KA
- Vehicle registration: KA
- Website: karnataka.gov.in

Mugalakhod is a village in the southern state of Karnataka, India. It is located in the Raybag taluk of Belagavi district in Karnataka.

== Demographics ==
At the 2001 India census, Mugalakhod had a population of 7168 with 3677 males and 3491 females. It's 10 km from Mahalingapur and 10 km from Mudhol

== See also ==
- Belgaum
- Districts of Karnataka
