= Navanagar =

Planned city in Karnataka, India

Coordinates: 22°28′N 70°04′E

Navanagar is the new planned city created because of submergence of parts of old Bagalkot city, Karnataka, India.

The blueprint for the township was prepared by Charles Correa. The town was originally designed with 63 sectors spread across 1,521 acres (616 hectares) of land, six kilometres away from the old city. Of the 63 sectors, 56 were exclusively meant to rehabilitate those affected by the Almatti Dam. The Government of Karnataka had acquired 4,500 acres (1,800 hectares) of land for the project.
