= Mahalingpur =

Mahalingpur Mahalingapura
- Town
- Mahalingpur
- Nickname: Jaggery City
- Location in Karnataka, India
- Coordinates: +) 16.38°N 75.12°E
- Country: India
- State: Karnataka
- District: Bagalkot.
- Taluka: Rabkavi-Banhatti
- Named for: Sri Guru Mahalingeshwar

Government
  - Type: Democracy
  - Body: Town Municipal Council

Area
  - Total: 9.8 km^{2} (3.8 sq mi)
  - Rank: 1

Population
  - Total: 45,000 +
  - Density: 4,600/km^{2} (12,000/sq mi)
- Demonym: Mahalingpurian

Languages
  - Official: Kannada
- Time zone: UTC+5:30 (IST)
- PIN: 587312
- Vehicle registration: KA 48(Jamakhandi) KA 29(Bagalkot)
- Website: mahalingapuratown.mrc.gov.in

Mahalingpur or Mahalingapura in Kannada is a town of Bagalkot district in the Indian state of Karnataka. Agriculture, weaving and jaggery production are the primary industries here. In the past, town was called as Naragatti. Later renamed as Mahalingpur after the gracious appearance of Lord Shri Mahalingeshwara. People speak typical Kannada, understand English and Hindi. The town is known for its picturesque surroundings and pleasant climate. The Ghataprabha River flows through nearby Nandagaon village from its source, which lies to the southwest of the town, and in Kudala Sangama gets merge with Krishna. Mahalingpur is one of the major commercial towns in the Bagalkot district. Jaggery and Saari's are common export marketing stuffs here.

Mahalingpur Town Municipal Council, with population of about 36 thousand is Bagalkot district's one of the most populous town municipal council located in Bagalkot district of the state Karnataka in India. Total geographical area of Mahalingpur town municipal council is 9.8 square km's and it is the biggest city by area in the district. Population density of the city is 3679 persons per square km's. There are 23 wards in the city, among them Mahalingpur Ward No 20 is the most populous ward with population of 3083 and Mahalingpur Ward No 08 is the least populous ward with population of 291.

Nearest railway station is Kudchi which is 45 km far from here and Chikkodi road railway station, which is around 46 km far from here. District headquarter of the city is Bagalkot which is around 90 km away. Bangalore is the state headquarter of the city and is 610 km far from here. Yearly average rainfall of the city is 712.10 mm. Maximum temperature here reaches up to 39.40 °C and minimum temperature goes down to 11.55 °C.

== Demographics ==
As of 2011 India census, Mahalingpur had a population of 36,055. Among them about 18 thousand (51%) are male and about 18 thousand (49%) are female. 83% of the whole population are from general caste, 17% are from schedule caste and 1% are schedule tribes. Child (aged under 6 years) population of Mahalingpur town municipal council is 14%, among them 52% are boys and 48% are girls. There are 7212 households in the city and an average 5 persons live in every family.

=== Growth of Population ===
Population of the city has increased by 16.8% in last 10 years. In 2001 census total population here were about 31 thousand. Female population growth rate of the city is 17% which is 0.3% higher than male population growth rate of 16.7%. General caste population has increased by 14.4%; Schedule caste population has increased by 27.2%; Schedule Tribe population has increased by 109.1% and child population has increased by 7.4% in the city since last census.

=== Religion wise distribution of population ===
Hindus contribute 78% of the total population and are the largest religious community in the city followed by Muslims which contribute 22% of the total population.. Female Sex ratio per 1000 male in Hindus are 986 in Muslims are 961.

=== Sex Ratio - Females per 1000 Male ===
As of 2011 census there are 980 females per 1000 male in the city. Sex ratio in general caste is 973, in schedule caste is 1026 and in schedule tribe is 809. There are 916 girls under 6 years of age per 1000 boys of the same age in the city. Overall sex ratio in the city has increased by 2 females per 1000 male during the years from 2001 to 2011. Child sex ratio here has decreased by 26 girls per 1000 boys during the same time.

=== Literacy ===
Total about 24 thousand people in the city are literate, among them about 13 thousand are male and about 11 thousand are female. Literacy rate (children under 6 are excluded) of Mahalingpur is 77%. 84% of male and 69% of female population are literate here. Overall literacy rate in the city has increased by 10%. Male literacy has gone up by 5% and female literacy rate has gone up by 14%.

=== Workers profile ===
Mahalingpur has 36% (about 13 thousand) population engaged in either main or marginal works. 55% male and 17% female population are working population. 50% of total male population are main (full time) workers and 5% are marginal (part time) workers. For women 13% of total female population are main and 4% are marginal workers.

== Colleges ==
- K.L.E Society's S.C.P Arts and D.D Shirol Commerce College Mahalingpur
- K.L.E Society's S.C.P College Of B.Sc.
- K.L.E. Society's Polytechnic
- Government Jr. College for Arts and Commerce and Science
- Vivekananda ITI
- Dr. Vanahalli Homoeopathic Pharmacy College

== Schools ==
- S.C.P.M.P.S., Mahalingpur
- Basavanand Primary & High School, Mahalingpur
- Mahalingapur Public School, Chimmad
- C. K. Chinchali Primary and High School (Kannada & English Medium)
- K.L.E. primary, secondary, high school, Mahalingpur
- Pragati Primary school & high school, Mahalingpur
- K J Somaiya English Medium Primary and High school, Sammerwadi
- K J Somaiya Kannada Medium Primary and High school, Sammerwadi
- Jaycee English Medium Primary and High school, Mahalingpur
- Jnyana Jyoti Higher Primary School, Mahalingpur
- Banashankari Primary School, Mahalingpur
- Swami Vivekananda Primary School, Mahalingpur
- Jnyana Gurukul School, Mahalingpur
- Dr S Radhakrishnan Higher Primary School, Mahalingpur
- Govt High School Mahalingapur
