= Mudhol =

- City
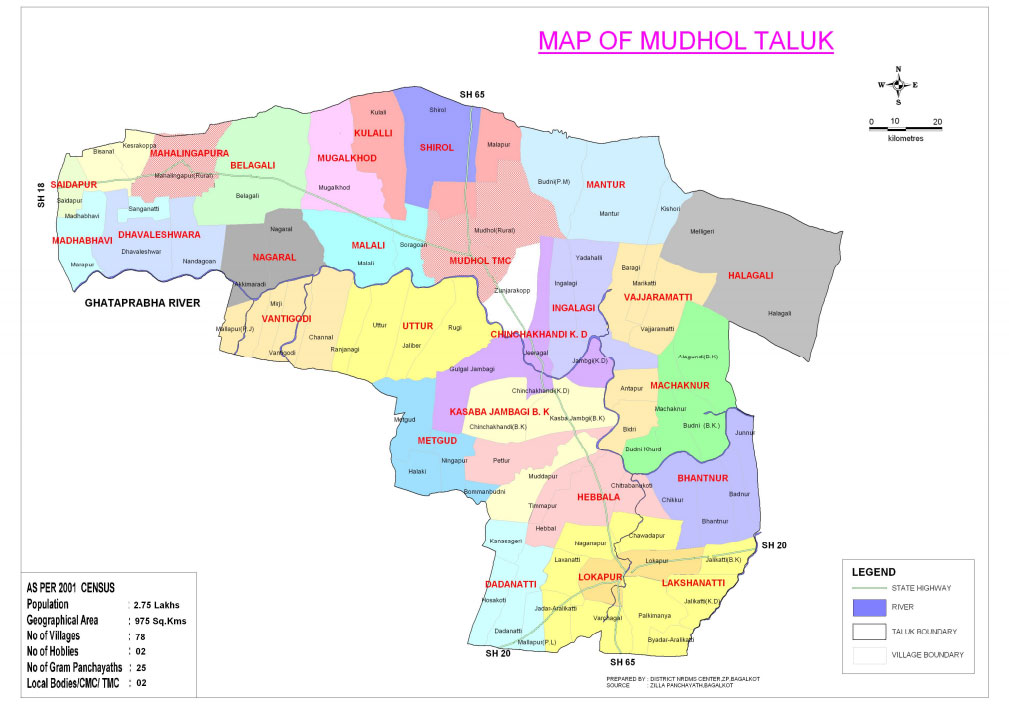
- Mudhol Taluk Map
- Nickname: Ranna nadu
- Location in Karnataka, India
- Coordinates: 16.35°N 75.2833°E
- Country: India
- State: Karnataka
- District: Bagalakote

Area
  - Total: 12.42 km^{2} (4.80 sq mi)
- Elevation: 548 m (1,798 ft)

Population (2011)
  - Total: 52,199
  - Density: 4,001.29/km^{2} (10,363.3/sq mi)

Languages
  - Official: Kannada
- Time zone: UTC+5:30 (IST)
- PIN CODE: 587 313
- Telephone code: 08350
- Vehicle registration: KA48
- Website: www.nammamudhol.com

Mudhol is a city previously known as "'Muduvolalu"' in the Bagalkote District in the northern part of the South India state of Karnataka. It is about 60 km (37 mi) from the district headquarters of Bagalkot and 25 km (16 mi) from subdivision of Jamakhandi. It is famous for a breed of dog known as the Mudhol Hound, and for its wrestling tradition. Mudhol State was ruled by the Ghorpade-Maratha royal family.

== History ==
The Principality of Mudhol ruled by the Ghorpade dynasty of the Marathas, was one of the 9-gun princely states of British India, under the summit of Niranjan. The state measured 368 square miles (508 km^{2}) in area. According to the 1901 census, the population was 63,001, with the population of the town itself at 8,359 in that year. In 1901, the state enjoyed revenue estimated at £20,000. The state flag, called 'Bavuta', has a triangular tricolor of horizontal bands, in order from the top: white, black and green. All color bands came to the point in the fly.

== Geography ==
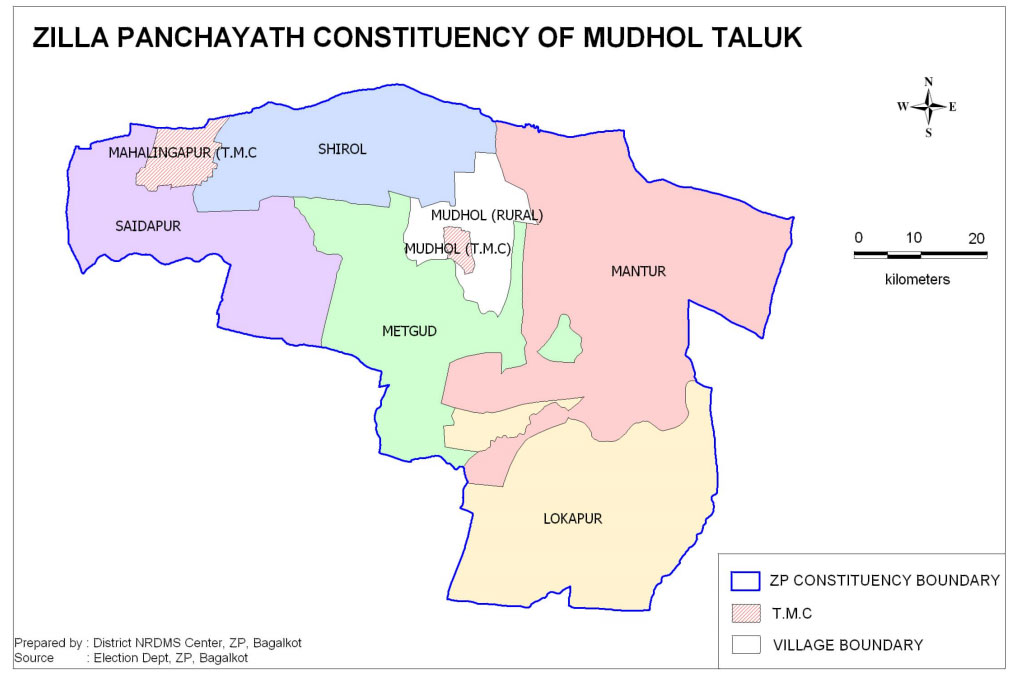
Mudhol Taluk ZP Constituency Map.jpg

Mudhol is located at 16.35°N 75.28°E. It has an average elevation of 549 metres (1801 feet).Mudhol receives an average of 700-750 mm of rainfall annually (2017).

== Demographics ==
As of the 2011 census, Mudhol had a population of 52,199. Males constituted 51% of the population and females 49%. In Mudhol, 15% of the population is under 6 years of age. This compares with a population of 42,461 in 2001.

== Culture ==
There is an old underground Shiva Temple (called "Nelagudi" which means "Underground Temple").

The city is noted for its grinding stones. Mahalingapura is a town about 19 km to the northwest of Mudhol. Its earlier name, Naragatti, was changed to Mahalingapura in honor of Sant Mahalingeshwara.

Mudhol is famous for Ranna, a renowned Kannada poet, popularly known as "Maha Kavi". Ranna was a Jain. In recognition of his contribution to the Halegannada (Old Kannada) literature, The Government of Karnataka has built a stadium named after him and is in the process of commissioning a community hall and constructing a library that will bear his name.

The 64th Kannada Sahithya Sammelana was organised in Mudhol in 1995 under the presidency of H. L. Nagegowda.

The town has a large number of handloom workers and handmade sarees manufactured here have a wide market.

Mudhol was declared the ‘fastest mover’ in south zone with a population between 50,000 and 1 lakh in the Swachh Survekshan 2021 rankings, which were announced on November 20, 2021.

== Royal Mudhol Hound ==
Mudhol has a native breed of hunting dogs called the "Mudhol Hounds". The breed is known for stamina, sharpness and agility and has international recognition through the Kennel Club of India. This breed of dog is considered to be on the verge of extinction and government agencies are putting all out efforts to save the breed. A postage stamp with a face value of Rs. 5 was released by the Indian Postal Department in recognition of the Mudhol Hound.

Shrimant Rajesaheb Malojirao Ghorpade of Mudhol (1884-1937) of the Mudhol State is credited with popularizing the Mudhol Hound. He noticed local tribal people using these hounds for hunting. Using selective breeding, he was able to create the Royal Mudhol Hound. On a visit to England in the early 1900s, the Maharaja (of Mudhol State) presented King George V a pair of Mudhol Hounds, which popularized the Mudhol Hound breed.

== Bibliography ==
- Chisholm, Hugh, ed. (1911). "Mudhol" . Encyclopædia Britannica. Vol. 18 (11th ed.). Cambridge University Press. p. 955.
