= Hunagunda =

Hungund
- Town/Taluk
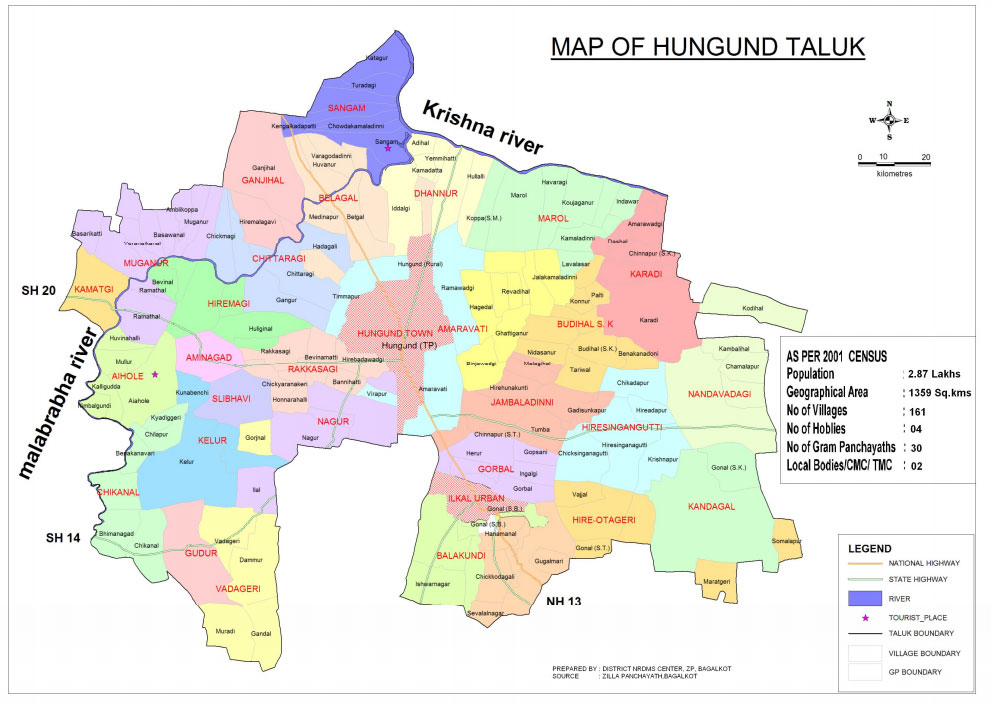
- Hungund Taluk Map before creation of Ilkal Taluk

- Location in Karnataka, India
- Coordinates: 16.0619°N 76.0603°E
- Country: India
- State: Karnataka
- District: Bagalkot

Area
  - Total: 3.25 km^{2} (1.25 sq mi)
- Elevation: 530 m (1,740 ft)

Population (2001)
  - Total: 18,037
  - Density: 5,549.85/km^{2} (14,374.0/sq mi)

Languages
  - Official: Kannada
- Time zone: UTC+5:30 (IST)
- PIN: 587 118
- Telephone code: 08351
- Vehicle registration: KA-29
- Website: www.hungundtown.mrc.gov.in

Hungund or Hunagunda is a taluk in the northern district of Bagalkot in Karnataka, India. Major towns in the taluk are Amingad, Hunagunda. Kudalasangama, where the social reformist Basavanna died, is located in the taluk. Hunagunda Taluk also contains Aihole and Pattadkal which were once under the rule of Chalukyas of Badami. Amingad is known for Amingad karadantu, a sweet dish.

== Geography ==
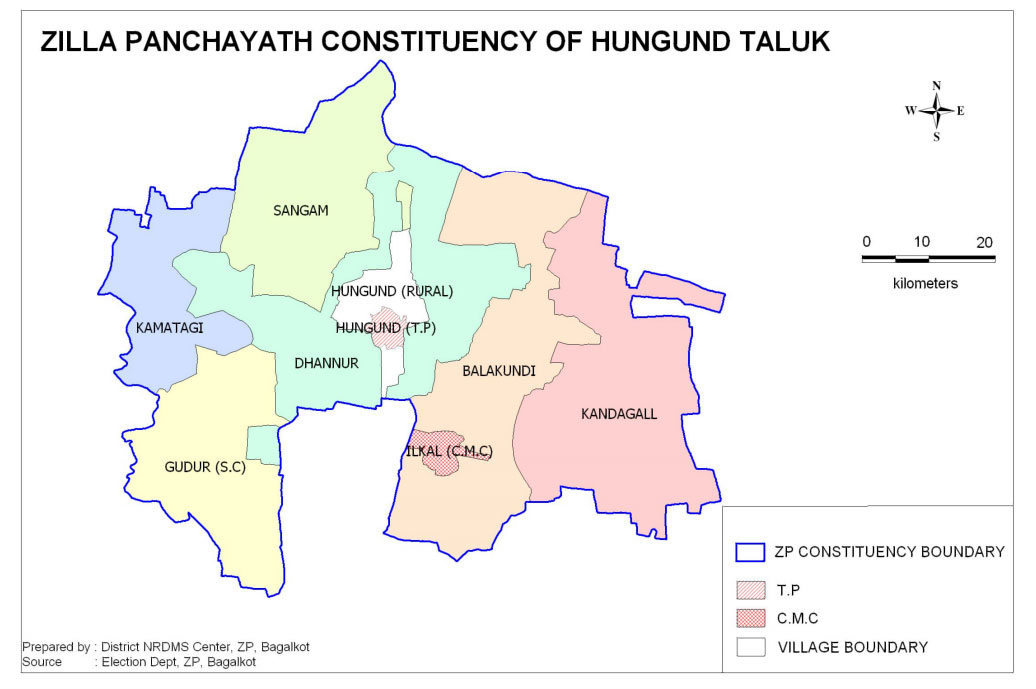
Hungund Taluk ZP Constituency Map before creation of Ilkal Taluk

Hungund is located at 16.07°N 76.05°E. It has an average elevation of 531 metres (1742 feet). The soil found in the area is usually black or red and the soil is very fertile.

=== Tourism Places around Hunagund ===
- Aihole
- Pattadakal

== Demographics ==
As of the 2001 Indian census, Hunagunda had a population of 18,035. Males constituted 51% of the population and females 49%. Hunagunda had an average literacy rate of 64%, higher than the national average of 59.5%: male literacy was 75%, and female literacy was 53%. In Hunagunda, 13% of the population was under 6 years of age. Kannada is the most widely spoken language in the taluk.

== Economy ==
Agriculture is the largest employer in Hunagunda. The chief crops cultivated are ragi and jowar, as well as groundnut, gram, tuvar daal and moong daal. Ilkal is famous for Ilkal saree and Red Granite.

== Education ==
Hunagunda and Ilkal have some noted educational institutions in the region. Vijaya Mahantesh High School in Hunagunda was established in 1915 as Anglo Vernacular School. Hunagunda also has a Rural Polytechnic college.

== See also ==
- Basavakalyan
- Ulavi
- Basavana Bagewadi
- Tangadagi
- Kudalasangama
- Muddebihal
