= Jamakhandi =

City in Bagalkot district, Karnataka, India

Jamkhandi
- City
- Jamkhandi
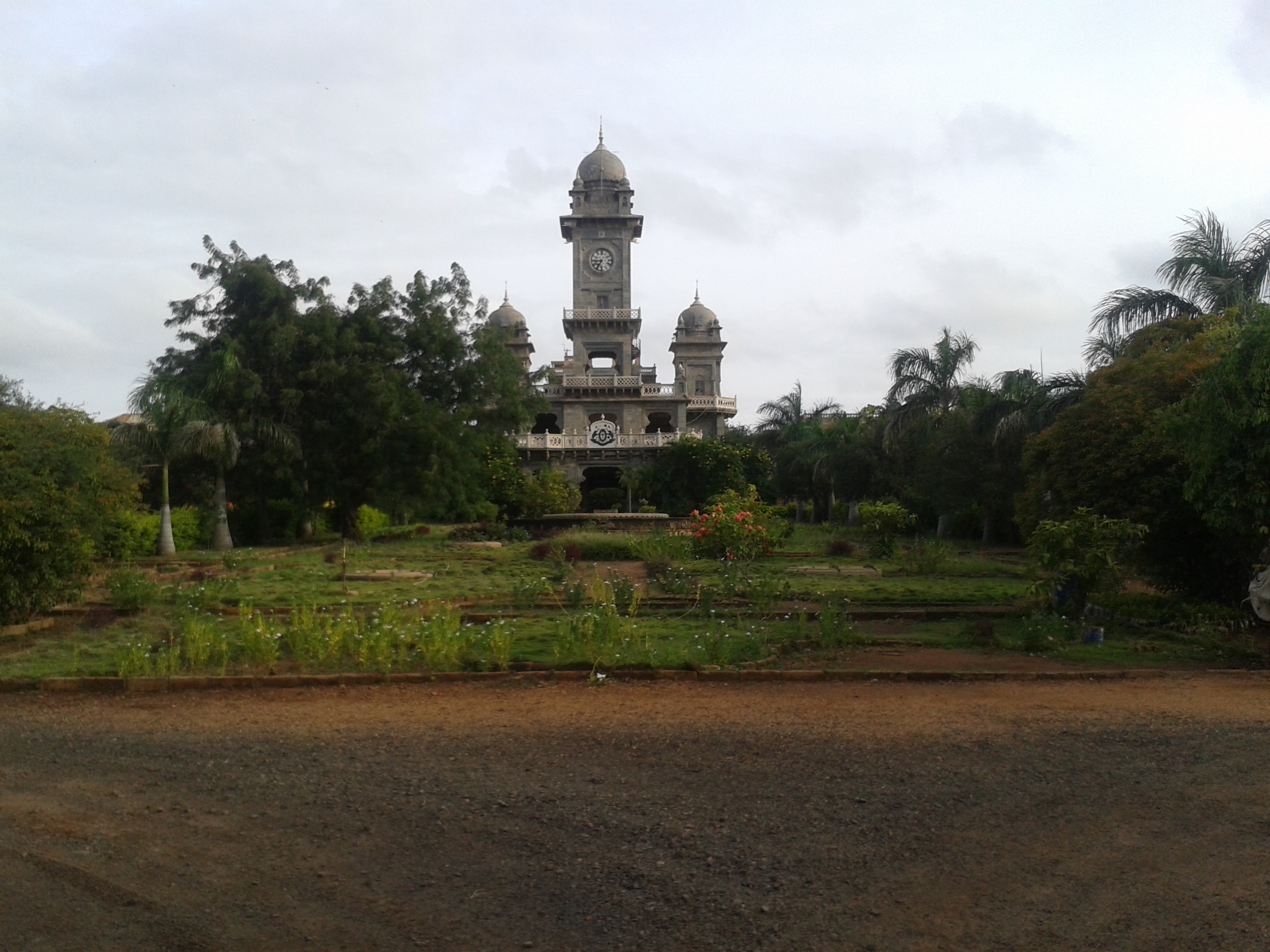
- Ramatirtha Palace

- Location in Karnataka, India
- Coordinates: 16°30′16″N 75°17′29″E
- Country: India
- State: Karnataka
- District: Bagalkot

Government
  - Body: City Municipal Council

Area
  - City: 9.39 km^{2} (3.63 sq mi)
  - Rural: 1,134 km^{2} (438 sq mi)
- Elevation: 543 m (1,781 ft)

Population (2011)
  - City: 68,938
  - Density: 7,340/km^{2} (19,000/sq mi)
  - Rural: 298,146
- Demonym: Jamkhandi

Languages
  - Official: Kannada
- Time zone: UTC+5:30 (IST)
- PIN: 587301
- Telephone code: 08353
- Vehicle registration: KA-48 (Jamakhandi)
- Website: www.jamkhandicity.mrc.gov.in

Jamakhandi is a city, taluk in Bagalkot district in the Indian state of Karnataka. It was the capital of the former princely state of Jamkhandi. It is located 90 km towards west from district headquarters. It is the first princely state to merge in constituent India based on demand to make Jamkhandi as a district. It is a subdivision of the district. Mudhol, Bilagi, Rabakavi-Banahatti, Teradal and Jamakhandi taluks come under Jamakhandi subdivision.

The city is located near to the Krishna river. It is education hub of the district. It was a princely state, the territory included Kundagol taluk of present day Dharwar district.it is the education hub of the district.

== Demographics ==
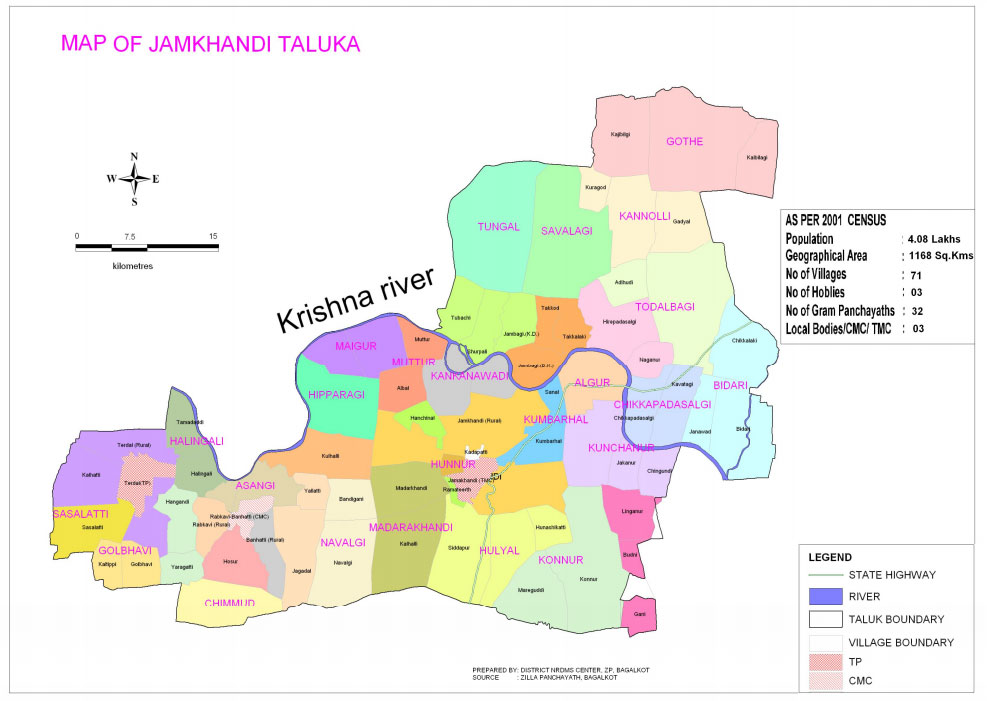
Jamkhandi Taluk Map before creation of Terdal and Rabkavi-Banhatti Taluk

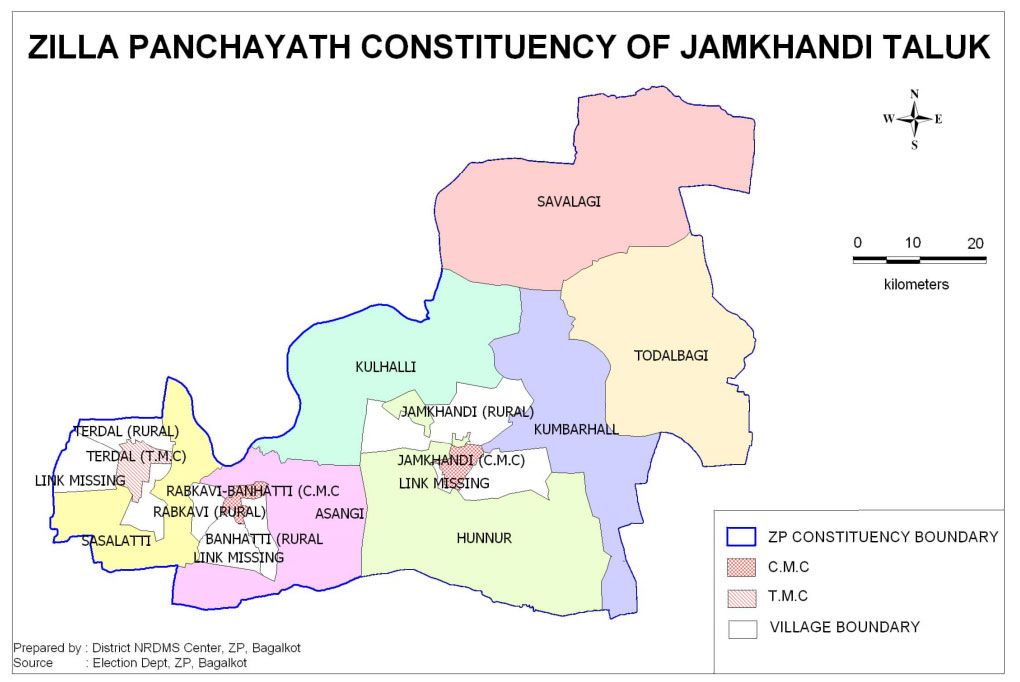
Jamkhandi Taluk ZP Constituency Map before creation of Terdal and Rabkavi-Banhatti Taluk

As of 2011 India census, Jamakhandi had a population of 68,398. Males constitute 50% of the population and females 50%. Jamkhandi has an average literacy rate of 60%: male literacy is 67%, and female literacy is 52%. In Jamakhandi, 14% of the population is under 6 years of age. As for 2023, there are 470,176 people and 90,067 households. The population of Jamakhandi is quite diverse one in terms of religion, language and culture. Kannada is the main language.

== Attractions ==
The Royal Palace of Patwardhans, the Ramatirtha Palace is the main attraction of Jamkhandi town. Katti kere :a lake with a garden and beautiful statues representing village life of India

== Notable people ==
- B. G. Kher First Chief Minister of Bombay State
- Vitthal Ramji Shinde was a prominent campaigner on behalf of the Dalit movement in India who established the Depressed Classes Mission of India to provide education to the Dalits.
- B. D. Jatti former Vice president of India
- M. C. Modi is great Indian eye surgeon. He pursued his early education in P B Highschool. He is believed to have performed a record half-a-million (five-lakh) eye surgeries. He travelled to remote villages and towns of India to hold mass eye camps

== History ==
Jamkhandi State was one of the Maratha princely states of British India. It was founded in 1811 and its capital was at Jamakhandi. It was administered as part of the Deccan States Agency of the Bombay Presidency and was one of the former states of the Southern Maratha Country.

Jamkhandi State was founded in 1811 by Shrimant Gopalrao Patwardhan. He was a descendant of Bramhibhoot Harbhat Buva Patwardhan of Kurandvad Senior State.

The name of the state was derived from Jambukeshwar temple. The temple itself got the name because it was deep inside a Jambul blueberry (Jambul in Marathi, Nerale Hannu in Kannada, Jamun in Hindi) forest. Today, a primary school functions from the temple precinct.

The town of Kundgol, which is in the neighboring Dharwar district, was a non-contiguous part of Jamkhandi State until it merged into the Indian Union on 19 February 1948.

=== Rulers ===
The rulers of the state bore the title 'Raja'. The Rajas of Jamkhandi belonged to the Patwardhan dynasty.

The rulers of Jamkhandi State were of the Chitpavan Brahmin caste, originally from the Kotawada in Ratnagiri. Haribhat, who was the family priest of another Chitpavan Brahmin, the chief of Ichalkaranji. Three of Haribhat's sons served Peshwa and distinguished themselves during various conquests. The Peshwa awarded them Jagirs of Jamkhandi, Tasgaon, Miraj, Sangli and Kurundwad, to honor their bravery and courage.

== Kings ==
- (1799 – 1811) Shrimat Gopala Rao Patwardhan
- (1811 – 1840) Gopal Rao Ramchandra Rao Patwardhan
- (18 Nov 1840 – 1897) Ramchandra Rao Gopal Rao a.k.a. Appa Sahib Patwardhan
- (1897 – 25 Feb 1924) Parashuram Rao Ramchandra Rao a.k.a. Bhav Sahib Patwardhan
- (25 Feb 1924 – 15 Aug 1947) Shankar Rao Parashuram Rao a.k.a. Appa Sahib Patwardhan (b. 1906)
