= Bagalkot district =

- District
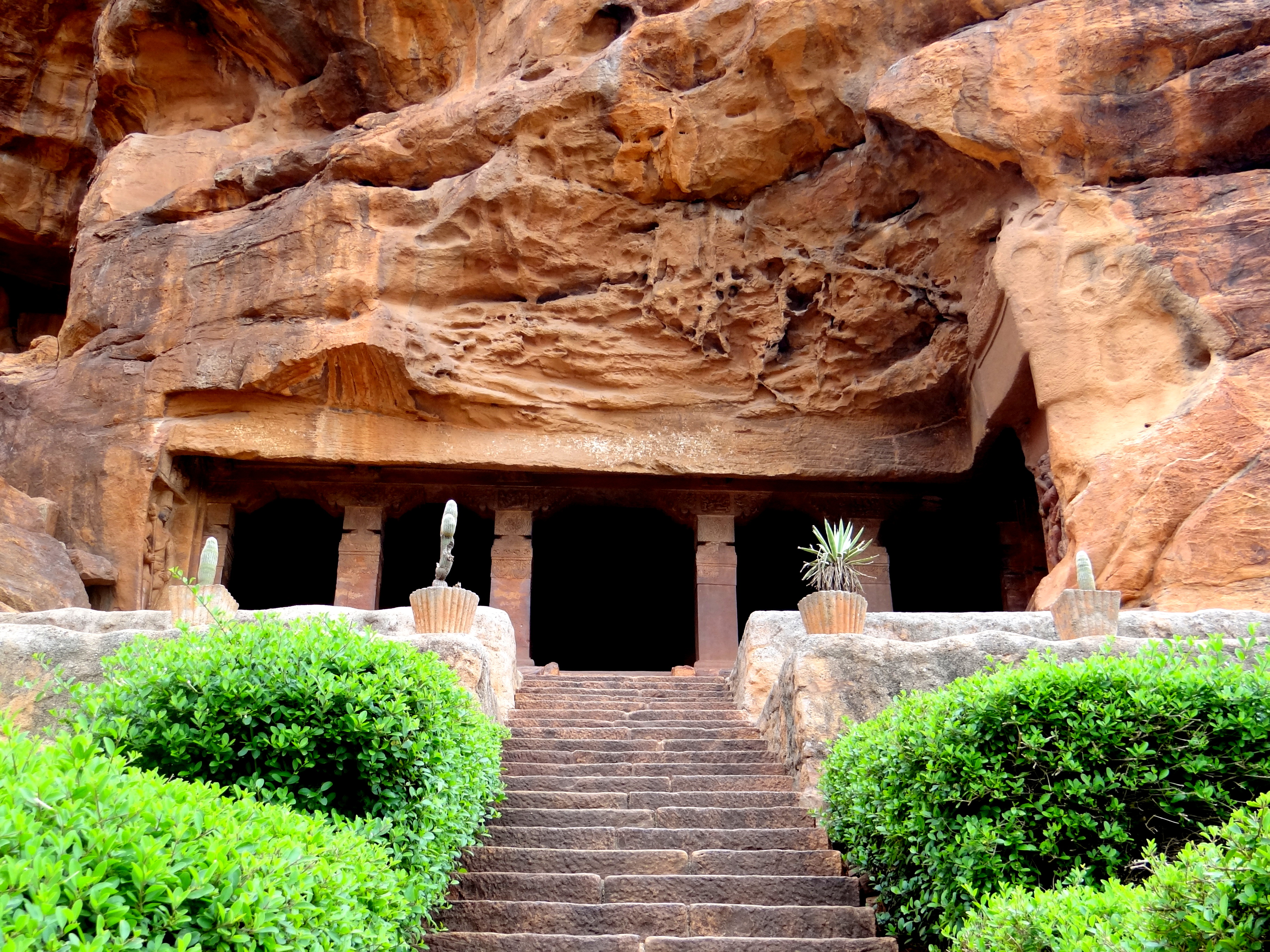
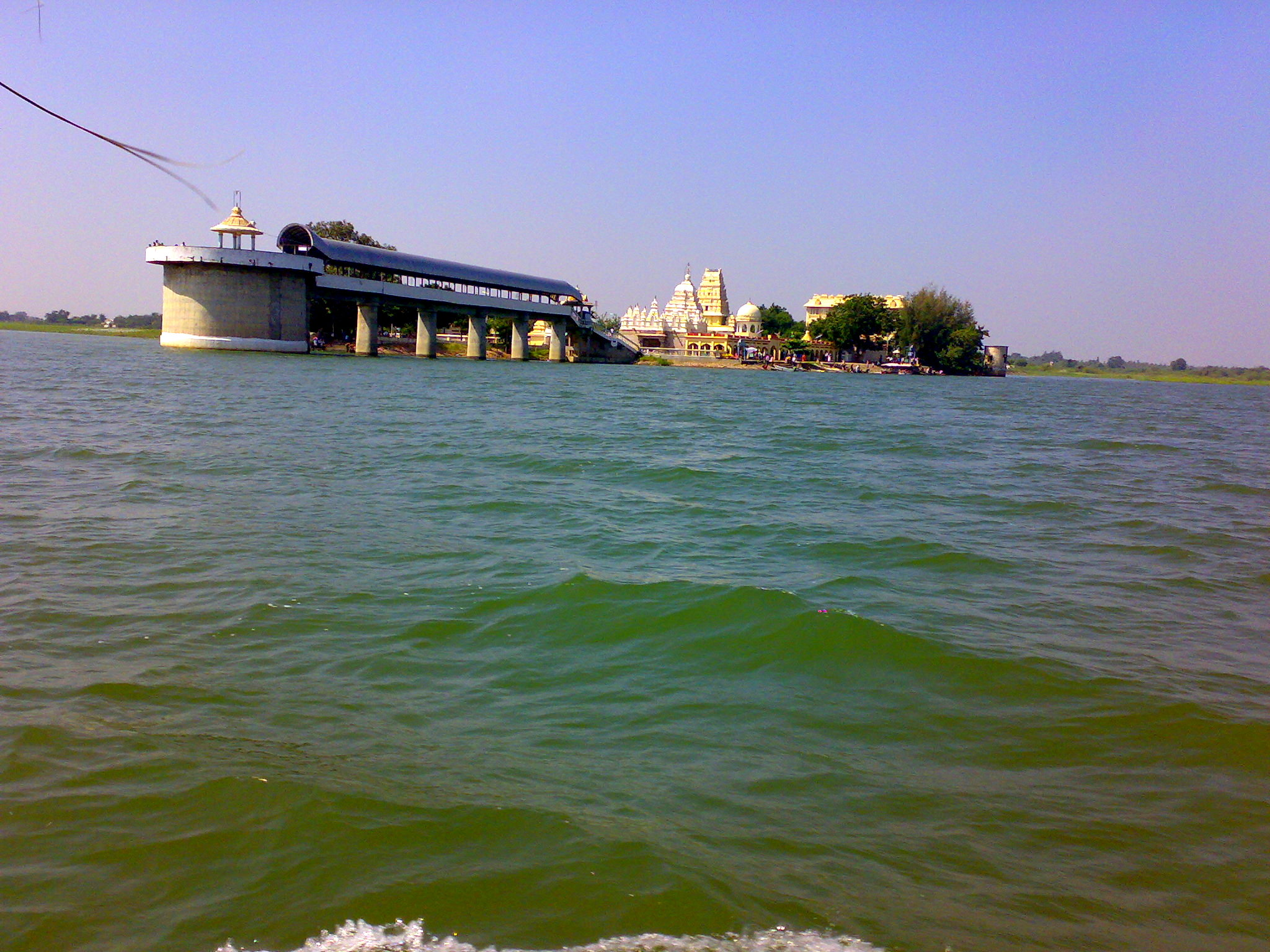
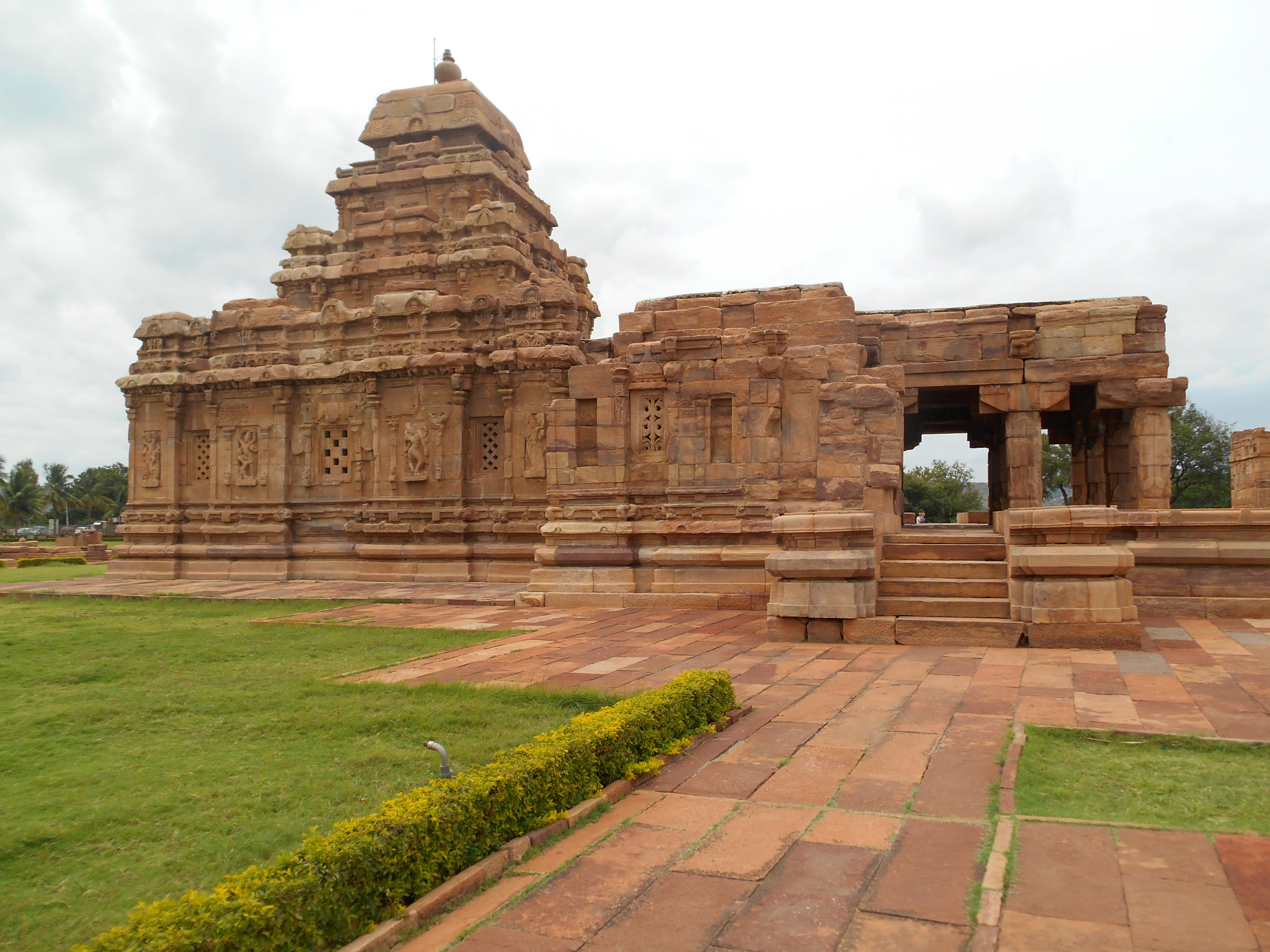
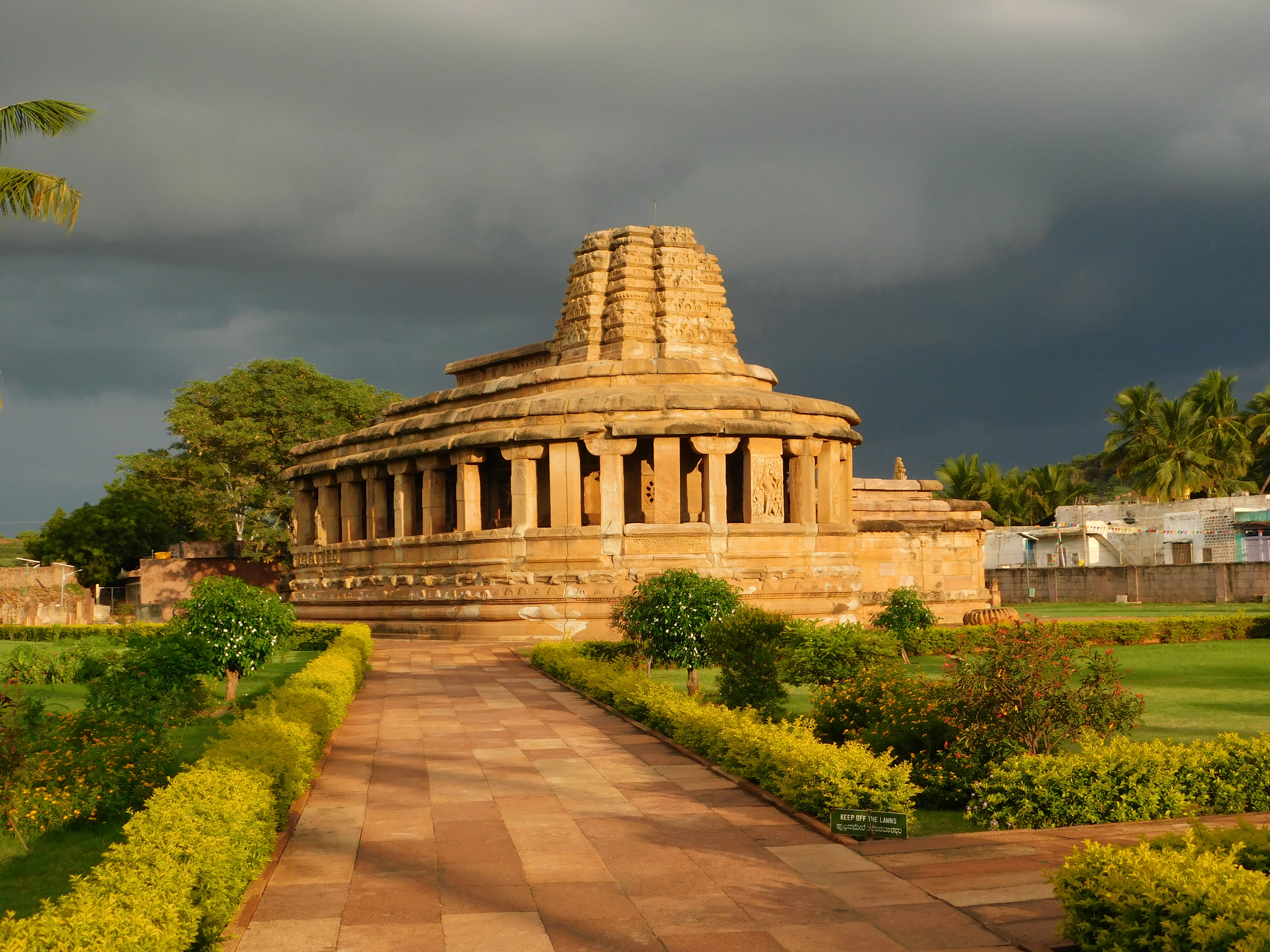
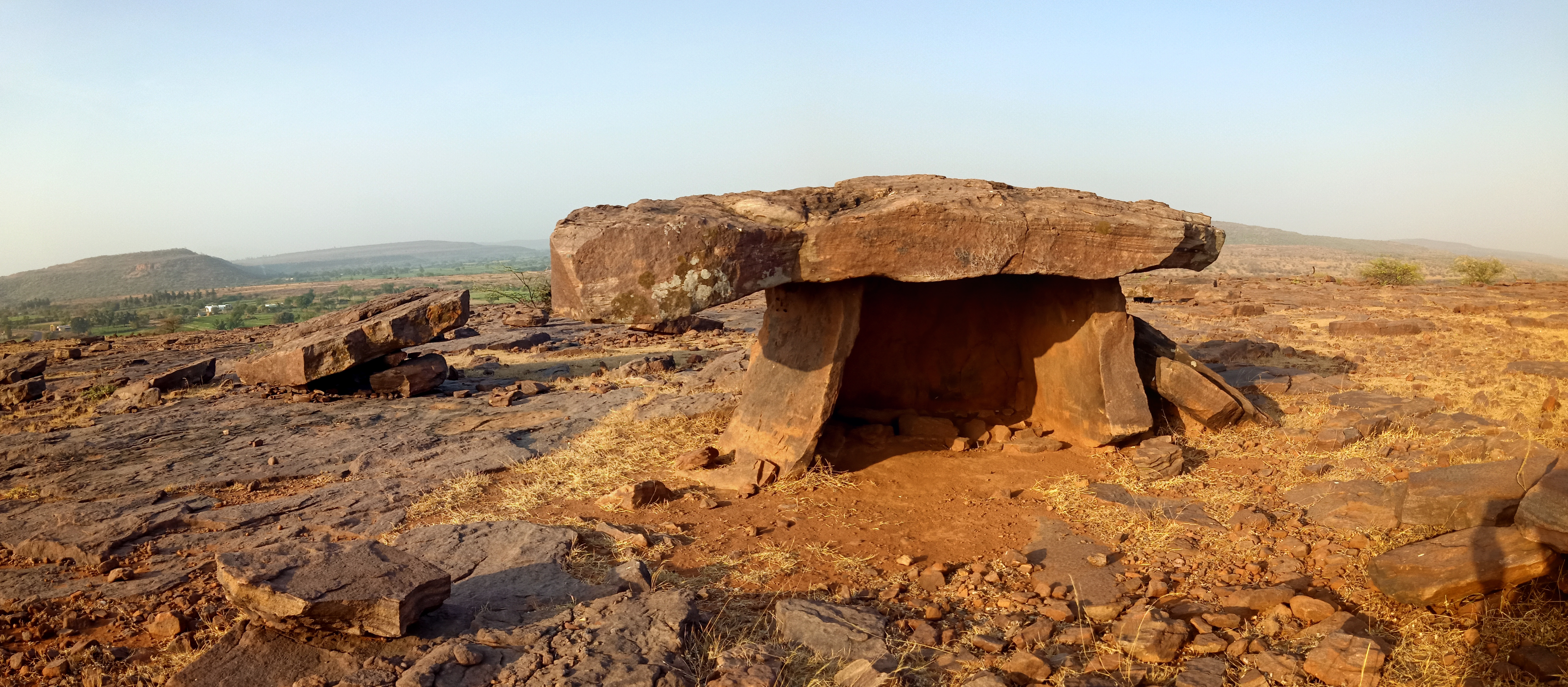
- Clockwise from top-right: Kudalasangama, Durga temple at Aihole, Megaliths on Meguti hill, Sangameshwara Temple at Pattadakal, Cave temple 1 at Badami
- Interactive map of Bagalkot district
- Coordinates: 16.12°N 75.45°E
- Country: India
- State: Karnataka
- Founded: 1997
- Founder: Government of Karnataka
- Headquarters: Bagalkot
- Talukas: Bagalkot; Rabkavi Banhatti; Guledgudda; Badami; Hunagunda; Jamakhandi; Mudhol; Ilkal; Bilagi; Terdal

Government
  - Type: Zilla Panchayat
  - Deputy Commissioner: Sangappa (IAS)
  - Lok Sabha constituencies: 1
  - Vidhan Sabha constituencies: 7

Area
  - Total: 6,593 km^{2} (2,546 sq mi)
- Elevation: 524 m (1,719 ft)

Population (2011)
  - Total: 1,889,752
  - Density: 286.6/km^{2} (742.4/sq mi)

Languages
  - Official: Kannada
- Time zone: UTC+5:30 (IST)
- PIN: 587101-587325
- Telephone code: + 91 (0)8354
- Vehicle registration: Bagalkot KA-29, Jamakhandi KA-48
- Website: bagalkot.nic.in

Bagalkot district (/ˈbɑːɡəlkoʊt/), is an administrative district in the Indian state of Karnataka. The district headquarters is located in the town of Bagalkot. The district is located in northern Karnataka and borders Belgaum, Gadag, Koppal, Raichur and Bijapur. The new Bagalkot district was carved out of Vijayapura in 1997 via Government of Karnataka directive Notification RD 42 LRD 87 Part III. The bifurcated Bagalkot district consists of ten taluks — Badami, Bagalkot, Bilagi, Guledgudda, Rabkavi Banhatti, Hunagund, Ilkal, Jamakhandi and Mudhol, Teradal.

The Ghataprabha River, Malaprabha River and Krishna River flow through the district. Kudalasangama lies at the point of confluence of the rivers Krishna and Malaprabha and is famous for being the samadhi of Basavanna.

== Origin ==
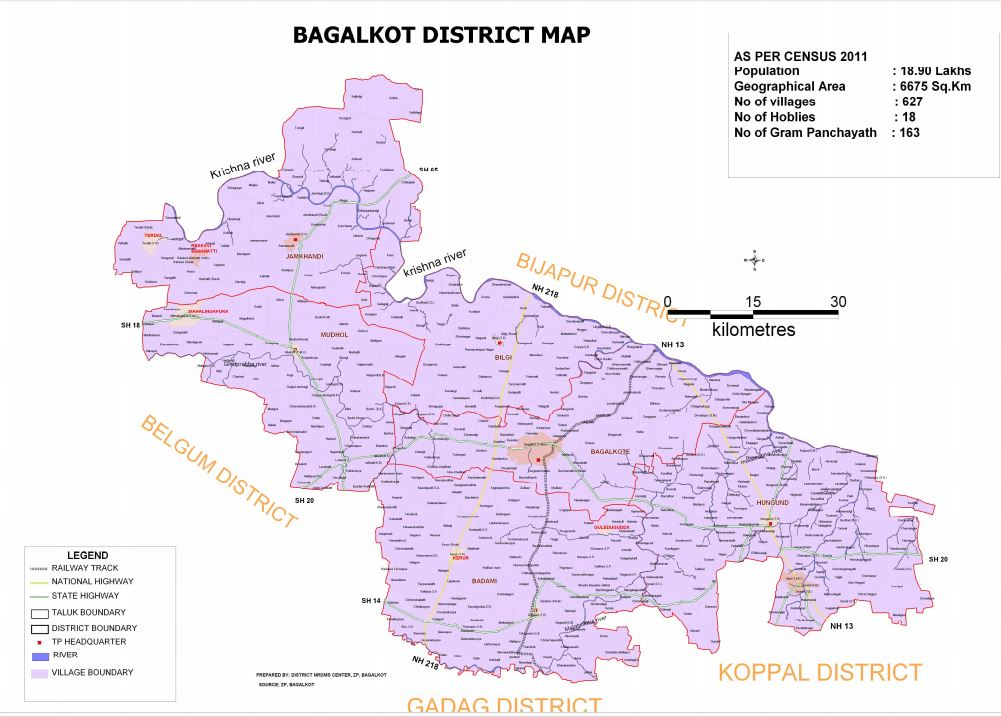
Bagalkot district Map by villages

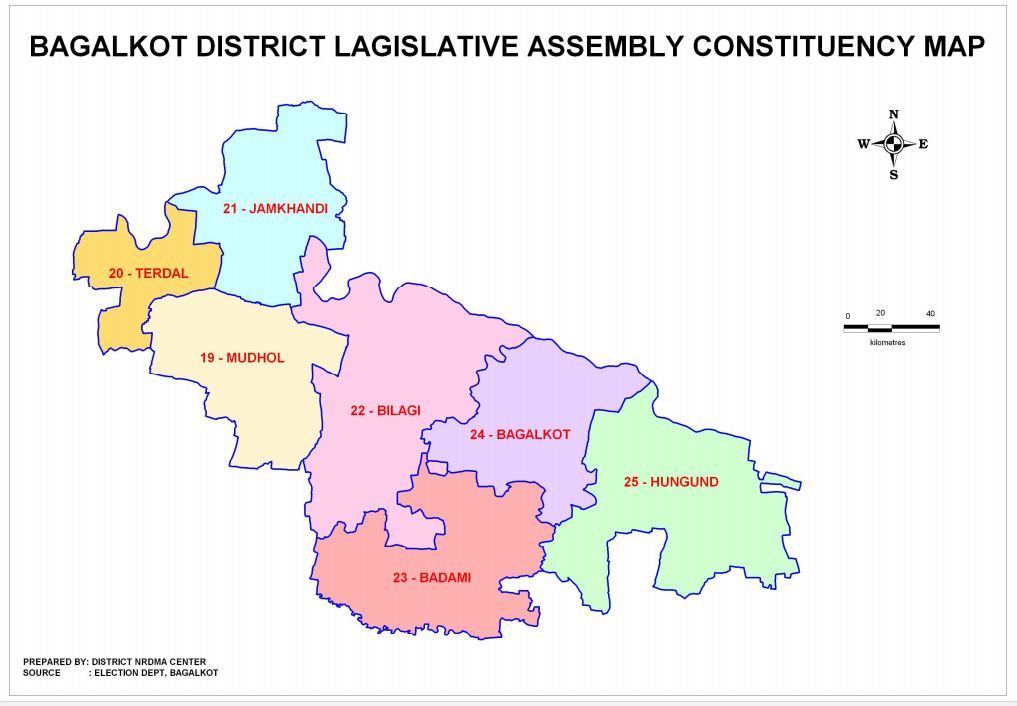
Bagalkot district taluk map

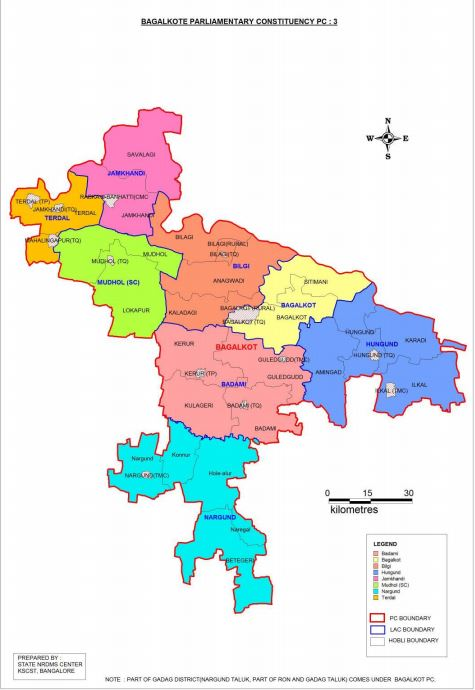
Bagalkot lok sabha map

Stone inscriptions identify Bagadige as the ancient name of Bagalkot. According to legends, the area was gifted by Rāvana, lord of Lanka, to his musicians. Other taluks in Bagalkot also have mythological origins. Badami, formerly known as Vatapi, was named after an asura king who, according to the Mahābhārata, ruled the area along with his brother Ilvala. Legend has it that both asuras were vanquished by the sage Agasthya. The northwestern taluk of Jamkhandi derives its name from the Chalukya temple dedicated to Jambukeshwara, a form of the Hindu deity Shiva. The town of Aihole, formerly the capital of the Chalukyan Empire of Banavasi was previously known as Ayyavole and Aryapura meaning Noble city. The western taluk of Mudhol was traditionally known as Muduvollal, literally Lovely town. The ancient town of Pattadakal was previously known as Raktapura, red town, and later as Pattadakal Kisuvoval.

The Greek astronomer Ptolemy previously identified many towns in the district of Bagalkot. Pattadakal was referred to as Petrigal, while Badami was known as Badiamaioi.

== Divisions ==
District map

Bagalkot district is divided into ten taluks; each taluk is further subdivided into hoblis and villages and habitations. There are 21 hoblis in the district:

- Badami taluk: Badami, Kerur, Kulageri
- Bagalkot taluk: Bagalkot, Kaladgi, Vidyagiri, Sitimani, Navanagar, Neelanagar
- Bilgi taluk: Anagwadi, Bilgi
- Hungund taluk: Amingad, Hungund, Karadi
- Jamkhandi taluk: Jamkhandi, Savalagi
- Terdal taluk: Terdal
- Rabkavi Banhatti taluk
- Ilkal taluk:Ilkal.Aminagada.Karadi
- Mudhol taluk: Lokapur, Mudhol, Mahalingpur
- Guledgudda taluk

== History ==
Over 191 Middle Palaeolithic localities have been discovered in the Kaladgi basin of the district. The discovery of settlements in the village of Lakhamapura near the Malaprabha valley yielded the identification of quartzitic artefacts such as handaxes and cleavers. A pre-Chalukyan brick temple was discovered at the foothills of Bachinagudda, in Pattadakal, where an idol depicting the bust of Chaturmukha Shiva was discovered. Evidence of megalithic habitation was also discovered at the foothills of Bachinagudda, as were Marahathi and Satavahana coins of a later period.

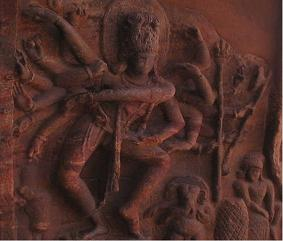
Chalukyan sculpture of Shiva in cave temple no. 1

The first documented evidence of the existence of Bagalkot district dates back to the 2nd century CE, when the taluks of Badami, Indi and Kalkeri were mentioned in the works of the Greek astronomer Ptolemy. In the 6th century CE, the Hindu Chalukya rulers ruled over much of present South India. The Chalukyan king Pulakeshin I established Bagalkot as his administrative headquarters; the district retained its prominent status until the Chalukyan empire was sacked by the Rashtrakutas in 753 CE. The Chinese explorer Hieun-Tsang visited Badami and described the people as "tall, proud,...brave and exceedingly chivalrous". He estimated the kingdom to be approximately 1,200 mi in circumference.

The period of rule of the Chalukyas of Badami, whose kingdom stretched from modern Karnataka to Maharashtra and Gujarat, was a highlight of Bagalkot's history. Chalukya king Pulakeshin II further consolidated the empire by battling with the Kadambas, Gangas, Mauryas of the Konkan, Gurjaras and Emperor Harshavardhana, whom he vanquished on the banks of the Narmada river Accounts of war were inscribed on stone structures in the town of Aihole, now located in the taluk of Hungund.

The Kalyani Chalukyas, descendants of the Badami Chalukyas, conquered the area before the dawn of the 10th century CE. Their rule was interspersed with wars against the Cholas and Hoysalas. The Kalyani Chalukyas moved their capital from Badami to Kalyani, in the present day district of Bidar. Akkadevi, sister of the Kalyani Chalukya Jayasimha II ruled in the area for more than 40 years from 1024 CE. During the course of her rule of the area, then known as Kisukadu, seventy villages from Bagalkot district were added to her administration. The Chola king Vīrarajendra seized the area by defeating Someshvara I at Koodalasangama. By the 11th century CE, all of Karnataka including Bagalkot fell into the dominion of the Hoysala Empire, first consolidated by Veera Ballala and later subordinated to the Sinda kings.

The Yadavas of Deogiri annexed Bagalkot in 1190 CE and ruled until approximately the thirteenth century. The Deccan invasion by the Muslim Khalji dynasty, led by Ala ud din Khalji in 1294 brought an end to the rule of the Yadavas. In the 14th century, much of this territory was overrun by Muhammad Taghlaq. That the Taghlaqs were undisputed overlords of this territory cannot be established since Harihara, first king of the Vijayanagara Empire, is supposed to have possessed territories as far north as Kaladgi in 1340 and because a fort was built under permission from Harihara in Badami during that period. In the late 15th century, the Adil Shahi dynasty founded by Yusuf Adil Shah established an independent state with Bijapur as its capital. It is from this time that Bagalkot's history is homogeneous to that of Bijapur's. In 1818, after having lost their kingdom to the British, the Maratha Peshwas of Satara were crowned underlords of the kingdom. With the failing of their brief reign which ended in 1948, the district passed into the hands of the British Raj and was incorporated into the dominion of the Bombay Presidency.

India gained independence from the British in 1947; thereafter, the States Reorganisation Act of 1956 allowed for the creation of a Mysore State, renamed Karnataka in 1971, and for Bijapur (and therefore Bagalkot) to be included in its dominion. A separate district of Bagalkot was carved out from the existing Bijapur district in 1997.

== Geography ==
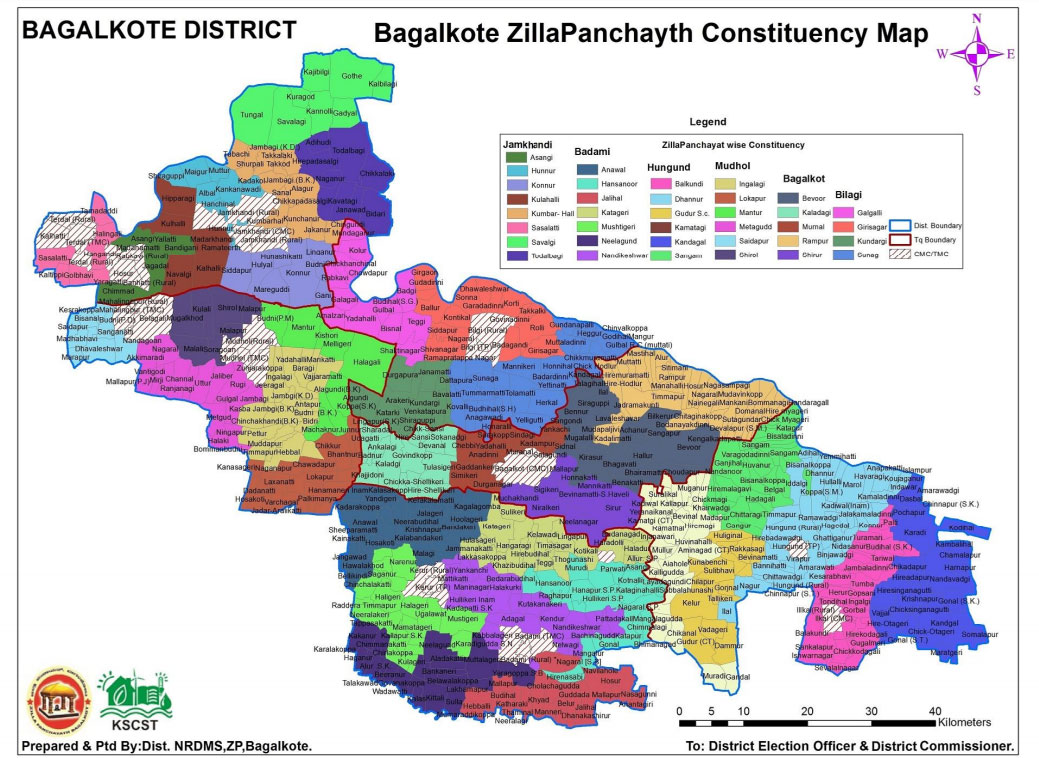
Bagalkot district ZP Constituency Map

The district of Bagalkot is situated entirely on the North Karnataka Plateau, which is part of the larger Deccan Plateau. Located in north-central Karnataka, Bagalkot is surrounded by Belgaum District to the west, Bijapur District and Kalaburagi district to the north and north-east, Raichur District to the east and Koppal District, Gadag District and Dharwad District to the south-east, south and south-west respectively. It is positioned at 16°12′N 75°45′E and covers an area of 6593 km^{2}. Bagalkot district has ten taluks — Bagalkot, Ilkal, Badami, Hunagunda, Mudhol, Jamkhandi, Bilgi, Rabkavi Banhatti, Terdal, Guledgudda. The average elevation in this area reaches approximately 610 m. Owing to its elevated geographical location, the district undergoes a temperate climate in accordance with established Indian meteorological norms. The region maintains a warm and dry climate year-round, with precipitation being moderate yet relatively sparse, particularly in the eastern expanse of the district. The average rainfall in Bagalkot district is approximately 662 mm annually. The months of September and December account for about 52% of the total annual rainfall.

The total extent of forest area of Bagalkot division is 83,893 hectares which constitute about 12.76 of its geographical area of 6,575 km^{2}. The division is spread over six taluks, viz., Bagalkot, Badami, Hungund, Bilagi, Mudhol and Jamkhandi. Bagalkot town is the divisional headquarters. The division has two sub-divisions, namely, Bagalkot and Jamkhandi, and comprises six ranges, namely, Badami, Bagalkot, Hungund, Bilagi, Jamkhandi and Mudhol. The division has in all 32 sections and 57 beats. Bagalkot division has one Wildlife Sanctuary, namely, Yadahalli Wildlife Sanctuary, which is situated in the forests of Bilagi and Mudhol taluks to protect the Chinkara (Indian Gazelle). The Sanctuary covers an area of 9,636 hectares. The Krishna River, Ghataprabha River and Malaprabha River flow through the region but are non perennial. Soil in the area can be categorised as either the majority black or minority red. Black soil retains moisture and is often used for the cultivation of cotton. Rabi and jowar are primarily cultivated in Bagalkot, as are groundnut, cotton, maize, bajra, wheat, sugarcane and tobacco. The district is also rich in mineral wealth. The village of Kaladgi, located 24 km from the town of Bagalkot, harbours copper. Iron ore also exists in the southern part of the district. Like much of Karnataka, the gneiss is the most common rock family. Common rock types in the region include greenstone, quartzite, sandstone and limestone. The management of the water supply to agricultural areas within the district is overseen by the Upper Krishna Project. Bagalkot has not been affected by major seismic activity due to it being located in the stable Zone II.

== Demographics ==
Historical population
Year	Pop.	±% p.a.
1901	466,200	—
1911	490,668	+0.51%
1921	467,062	−0.49%
1931	502,540	+0.73%
1941	570,522	+1.28%
1951	661,645	+1.49%
1961	771,602	+1.55%
1971	931,651	+1.90%
1981	1,151,005	+2.14%
1991	1,390,259	+1.91%
2001	1,651,892	+1.74%
2011	1,889,752	+1.35%

According to the 2011 census Bagalkot district has a population of 1,889,752, roughly equal to the nation of Lesotho or the US state of West Virginia. This gives it a ranking of 249th in India (out of a total of 640). The district has a population density of 288 inhabitants per square kilometre (750/sq mi) . Its population growth rate over the decade 2001–2011 was 14.46%. Bagalkot has a sex ratio of 984 females for every 1000 males, and a literacy rate of 69.39%. 31.64% of the population lives in urban areas. Scheduled Castes and Scheduled Tribes make up 16.89% and 5.14% of the population respectively.

Bagalkot is the second largest district in the Belgaum Division and the 15th most populous district in Karnataka. With over 1,651,892 inhabitants (of which 28.97% were urban), Bagalkot accounts for over 18% of the total population of the Belgaum Division. Bagalkot has 6 taluks, comprising a total of 18 hoblis and 627 villages. Of the 6 taluks, two are categorised as "More Backward Taluk" and one as "Most Backward Taluk". The district has 163 Gram Panchayats and 12 urban agglomerations. Bagalkot, with a decadal growth rate of about 19% is one of the ten fastest growing districts in Karnataka.

Religion in Bagalkot district (2011)
Hinduism	86.48%
Islam	11.64%
Jainism	1.33%
Others	0.55%

Over 86% of the population in the district is Hindu, while 11% of the population is Muslim. Jains account for a little over 1% of the population, while Christians account for 0.17%. Communal tensions are fairly uncommon in Bagalkot.

Languages of Bagalkot district (2011)
1. Kannada (86.1%)
2. Urdu (9.30%)
3. Marathi (1.48%)
4. Lambadi (1.47%)
5. Others (1.68%)

Kannada, the state language of Karnataka, is the most widely spoken language in the district by 86.07% of the population. Urdu is the second largest language, spoken by 9.30% of the population. Marathi and Lambadi are spoken by 1.48% and 1.47% of the population respectively.

The literacy rate of the district is 57.3%, higher than national levels (52%) but lower than the mean literacy rate of the state (66.6%). Bagalkot ranks 22nd out of the 27 districts in Karnataka for adult literacy. The population density of Bagalkot is approximately 251 persons per square kilometer. Housing conditions in the district were identified as above average, per India's 2001 national census. About 96% of the houses surveyed were recorded as either "Good" or "Livable". Mass media (radio, transistor, television) penetration was about 67%.

Primary workers constitute about 43% of the district's population. Of these, 65% work in agriculture related activities. The sex ratio of the district is 980 females per 1000 males, considerably higher than the national average — 927. The district's Net Domestic Income is US$ 5.8 billion. The per capita income of the district is about US$350 annually.

== Education ==
Bagalkot has a number of educational institutions, including Basaveshwara Vidya Vardhaka Sangha and Sakri Sangha. A number of colleges are affiliated with Rani Channamma University, Belgaum, Visvesvaraya Technological University, Rajiv Gandhi University of Health Sciences, Ramanagara. Basaveshvara Engineering College (BEC) was established in 1963. S Nijalingappa Medical College, P.M. Nadagouda Memorial Dental College & Hospital, HSK (Hanagal Shree Kumareshwar) Hospital and Research Centre, Bagalkot is affiliated with Rajiv Gandhi University of Health Sciences.

The University of Horticultural Sciences (UHS) is headquartered in Navanagar, Bagalkot with its constituent colleges spread across the state.

Bagalkot houses the Krishi Vignan Kendra.

== Economy ==
Agriculture is the largest employer in Bagalkot, with over 65% of the working population engaged in it; approximately 80% of female workers in Bagalkot are engaged in agriculture. Like most of north Karnataka, Bagalkot is very rich in black soil which is conducive to the cultivation of cotton. Bagalkot's economy was valued at US$5.6 billion, making it the 12th largest economy in Karnataka. The approximate per capital income is US$360. The chief crops cultivated are rabi and jowar, as well as groundnut, cotton, maize, bajra, wheat, sugarcane and tobacco. Jowar is largely cultivated because it can be grown during rainy seasons as well as during the winters. The crop also is the chief supply of food for the people. Pulses are also grown in the region, primarily tuvar daal, gram, kulthi, and mūng daal. Castor oil, linseed and sesamum are also grown in Bagalkot. Water supply for irrigation includes reservoirs such as the Kendur reservoir, which is six miles from Badami and the Muchkundi reservoir, which is 4 miles from Bagalkot. Famine due to lack of adequate rains is quite common in Bagalkot. A famine that struck the region in 1901 inflicted considerable financial loss to the agricultural industry in Bagalkot. The district has the fifth highest farmer suicide rate in Karnataka. Efficient water management techniques and government sops have only marginally mitigated the repercussions of the drought-stricken district.

== See also ==
- List of villages in Bagalkot district
