= Bagalkote =

Bagalkot
- City
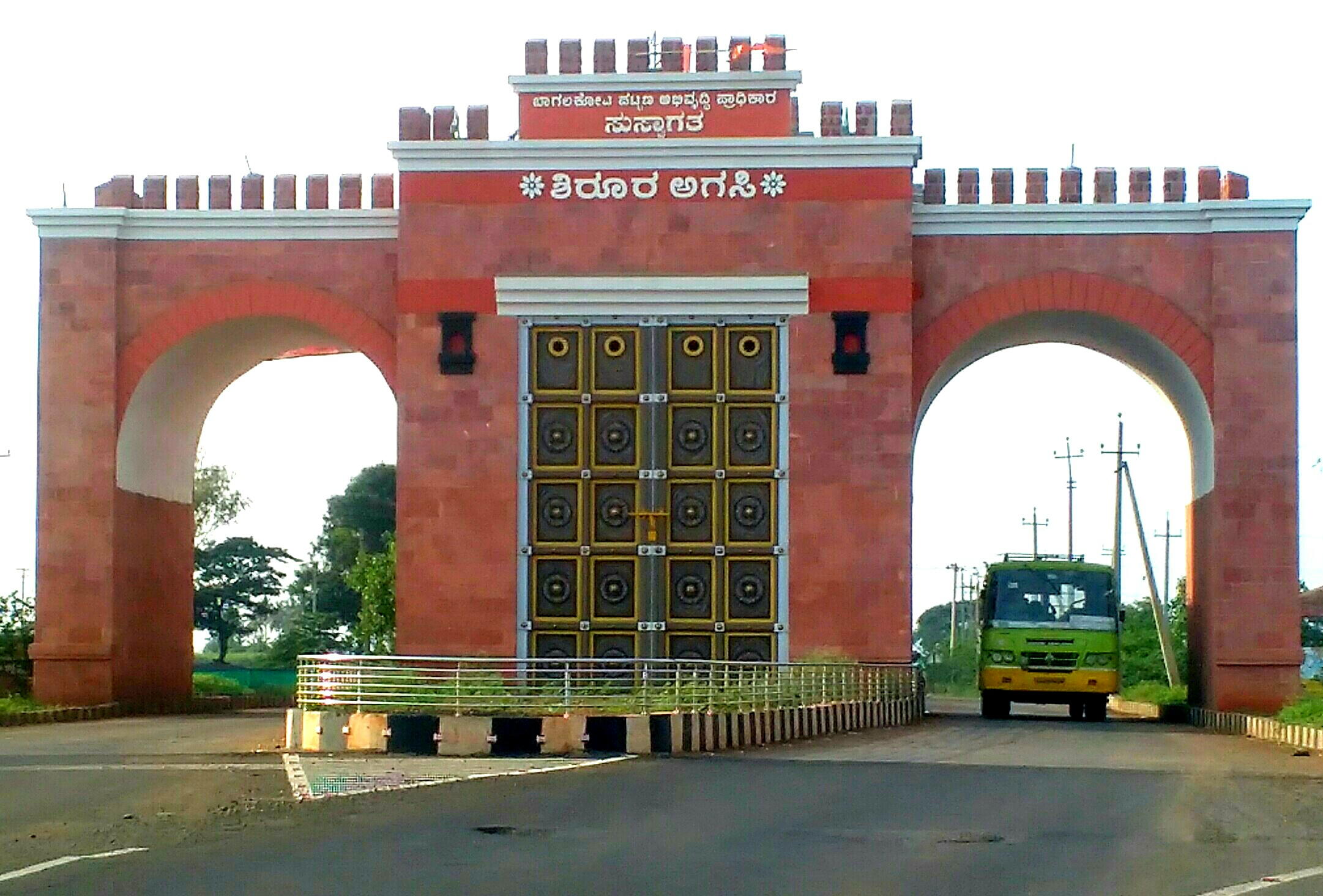
- Reconstructed Shirur Agasi
- Interactive map of Bagalkot
- Coordinates: 16.1817°N 75.6958°E
- Country: India
- State: Karnataka
- District: Bagalkot district

Government
  - Type: City Municipal Council (CMC)
  - Body: Bagalkot CMC & BTDA

Area
  - Total: 49.06 km^{2} (18.94 sq mi)
- Elevation: 537.06 m (1,762.0 ft)

Population (2011)
  - Total: 112,090
  - Density: 2,183/km^{2} (5,650/sq mi)
- Demonym: Bagalkotians
- Time zone: UTC+5:30 (IST)
- PIN: 587101-103
- Telephone code: 08354
- Vehicle registration: KA-29, KA-48
- Official language: Kannada
- Website: bagalkotecity.mrc.gov.in

Bagalkot, is a city in the state of Karnataka, India, which is also the headquarters of Bagalkot district. It is situated on branch of Ghataprabha River, The population of the urban agglomeration was 111,933 according to the provisional results of 2011 national census of India, the city is spread over an area of 49.06 square kilometres (18.94 sq mi) with an average elevation of 532 m (1,745 ft) above MSL.

Bagalkot became a separate district in when it was separated from the undivided district of Bijapur (Vijayapur)

== History ==
=== Existence of the city ===
According to stone inscriptions in the surrounding area, the town's name was formerly Bagadige. According to legend, the town was given to the Bhajantries (musicians) by Ravana, the king of Lanka who ruled this area. One of the Bijapur Adil Shahi king Ibrahim Adil Shah II is said to have presented the town to his daughter as bangle money (a tradition in which the daughter is given money to buy bangles, sarees, and gold ornaments from her parents after the marriage).

=== Rulers ===
Bagalkot remained under successive dominions of Vijayanagar emperors, Bijapur Adil Shahi, Peshwas, Kingdom of Mysore, Maratha rulers, and finally the British in 1818. In 1865, it was established as a municipality and civic amenities were provided to the residents of Bagalkot.

== Geography ==
Bagalkot is located at 16.18°N 75.7°E. It has an average elevation of 533 metres (1,749 ft). It is situated on the bank of the river Ghataprabha.

== Demographics ==
Religions in Bagalkot city (2011)
Religion	Percent
Hinduism	72.87%
Islam	25.52%
Jainism	0.58%
Others†	1.03%
Distribution of religions

At the time of the 2011 census, Bagalkot had a population of 111,933. Bagalkot city has a sex ratio of 985 females to males and a literacy rate of 85.40%. Scheduled Castes and Scheduled Tribes made up 10.33% and 3.78% of the population respectively.

Languages of Bagalkot city (2011)
1. Kannada (69.1%)
2. Urdu (22.1%)
3. Marathi (3.94%)
4. Hindi (1.07%)
5. Others (3.74%)

At the time of the 2011 census, 69.10% of the population spoke Kannada, 22.15% Urdu, 3.94% Marathi and 1.07% Hindi as their first language.

== Climate ==
The city is ranked among top 10 Indian cities with the cleanest air and best AQI in 2024.

Climate data for Bagalkote, elevation 524 m (1,719 ft), (1991–2020 normals, extremes 1985–2018 )
Month	Jan	Feb	Mar	Apr	May	Jun	Jul	Aug	Sep	Oct	Nov	Dec	Year
Record high °C (°F)	34.1 (93.4)	37.8 (100.0)	41.6 (106.9)	42.0 (107.6)	46.0 (114.8)	41.6 (106.9)	38.0 (100.4)	36.0 (96.8)	36.3 (97.3)	36.8 (98.2)	37.0 (98.6)	35.0 (95.0)	46.0 (114.8)
Mean daily maximum °C (°F)	29.3 (84.7)	32.0 (89.6)	35.2 (95.4)	37.1 (98.8)	37.6 (99.7)	32.3 (90.1)	29.6 (85.3)	29.2 (84.6)	29.9 (85.8)	29.9 (85.8)	29.4 (84.9)	28.5 (83.3)	31.7 (89.1)
Mean daily minimum °C (°F)	14.5 (58.1)	16.2 (61.2)	19.5 (67.1)	22.5 (72.5)	23.1 (73.6)	22.2 (72.0)	21.6 (70.9)	21.1 (70.0)	20.8 (69.4)	20.7 (69.3)	18.1 (64.6)	14.7 (58.5)	19.6 (67.3)
Record low °C (°F)	8.8 (47.8)	10.0 (50.0)	13.2 (55.8)	14.1 (57.4)	16.1 (61.0)	14.0 (57.2)	15.0 (59.0)	15.3 (59.5)	13.3 (55.9)	13.2 (55.8)	9.6 (49.3)	8.2 (46.8)	8.2 (46.8)
Average rainfall mm (inches)	1.6 (0.06)	1.3 (0.05)	1.5 (0.06)	20.4 (0.80)	45.3 (1.78)	109.0 (4.29)	46.8 (1.84)	77.3 (3.04)	111.8 (4.40)	112.6 (4.43)	18.0 (0.71)	7.7 (0.30)	553.3 (21.78)
Average rainy days	0.2	0.1	0.3	1.4	3.1	5.9	4.3	5.3	6.3	5.7	1.3	0.5	34.4
Average relative humidity (%) (at 17:30 IST)	50	43	42	46	47	62	69	68	64	62	55	50	55
Source: India Meteorological Department

== Gallery ==
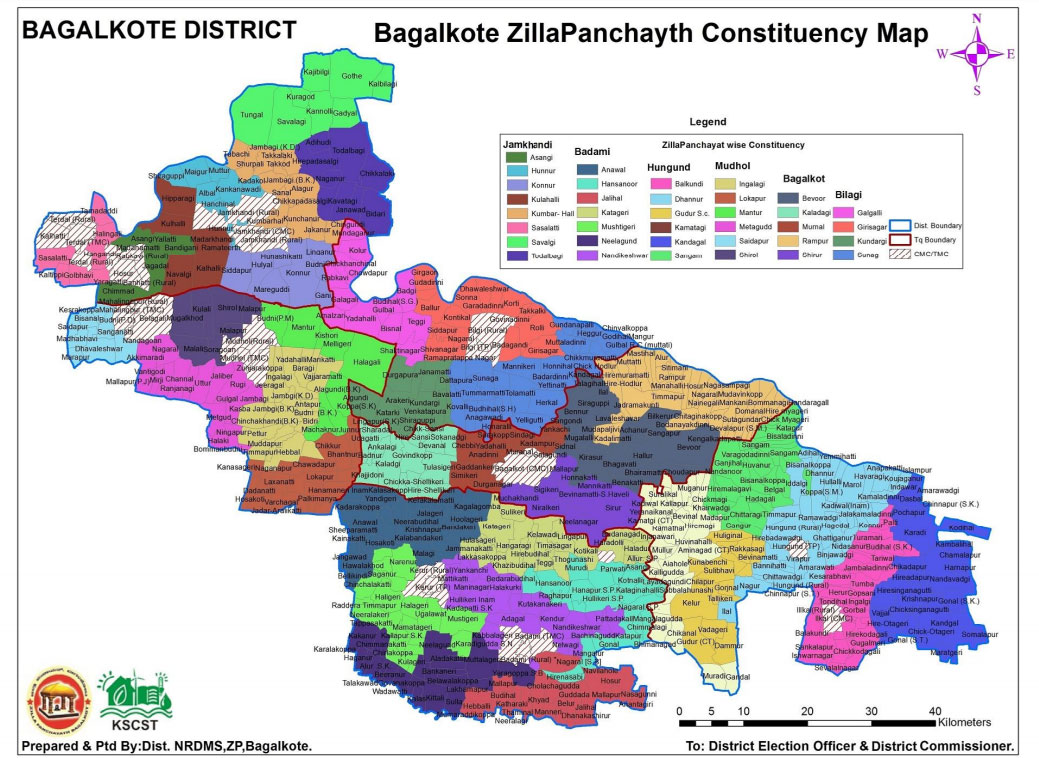
Bagalkot district ZP Constituency Map

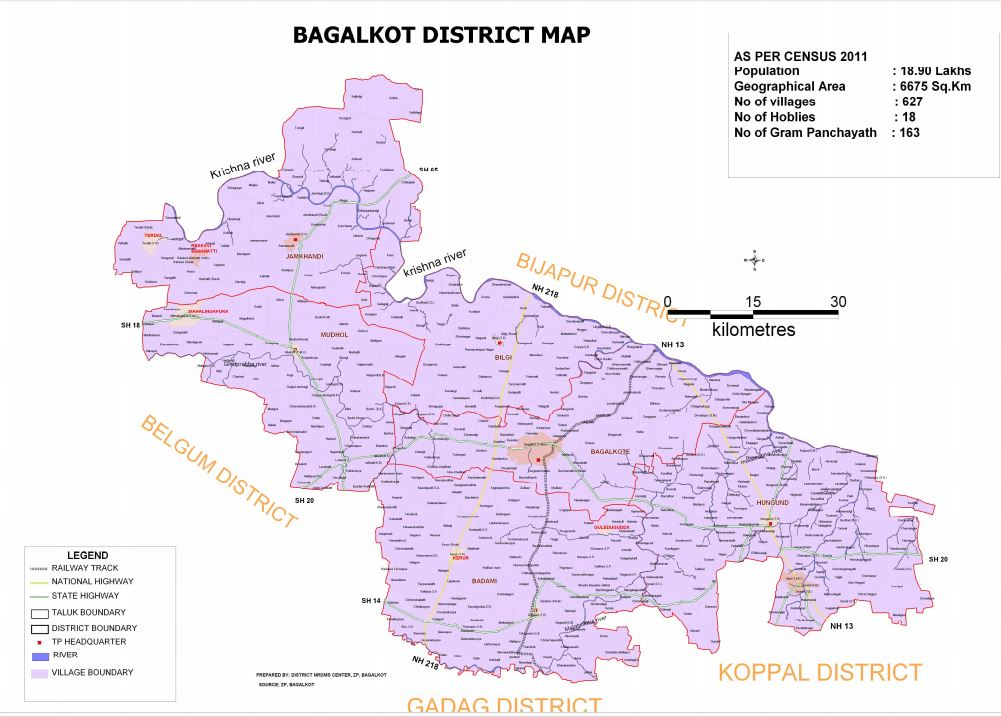
Bagalkot district Map by villages

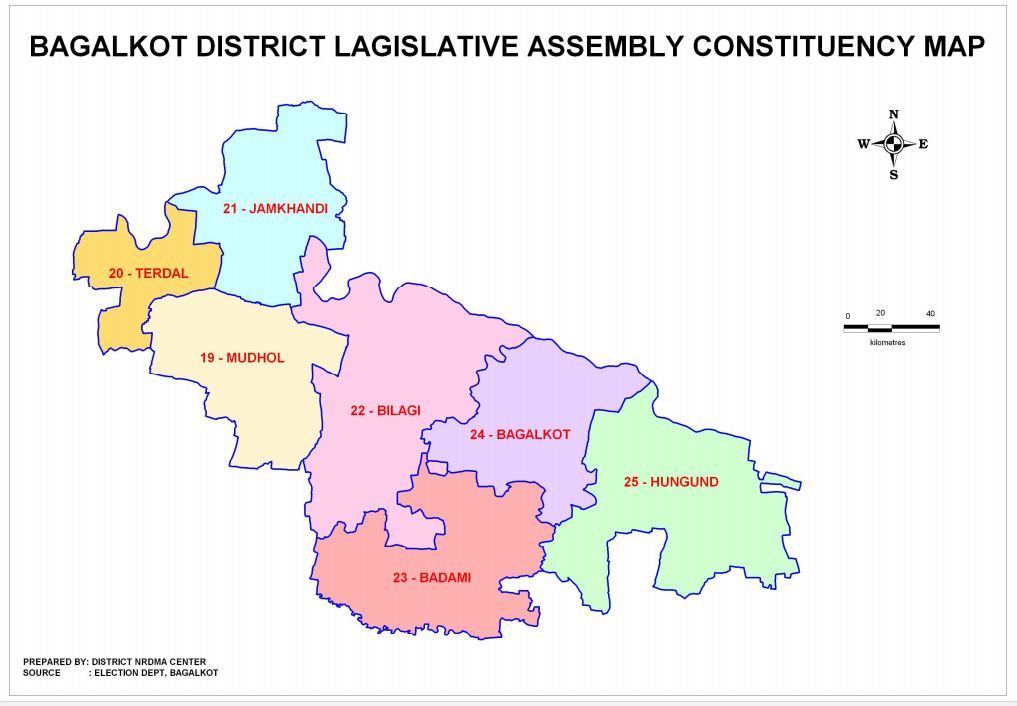
Bagalkot district taluk map

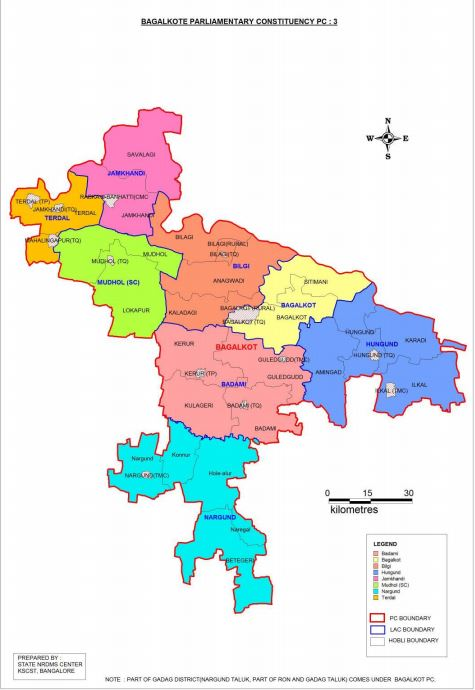
Bagalkot lok sabha map
