= Jharli =

- Village
- Location in Haryana, India Jharli (India)
- Country: India
- State: Haryana
- Region: North India
- District: Jhajjar
- Founder: Godaram Dudi

Government
  - Type: Gram panchayat
  - Body: Sarpanch All Jharli Village

Languages
  - Official: Hindi
- Time zone: UTC+5:30 (IST)
- PIN: 124106
- ISO 3166 code: IN-HR
- Vehicle registration: HR-14
- Website: haryana.gov.in

Jharli is a village in Matanhail tehsil of Jhajjar district in the Indian state of Haryana. It has gained popularity after the set up of a thermal power plant, Indira Gandhi Super Thermal Power Project by NTPC Limited. It is developing as an industrial town with two power plants and three cement factories. Before it was used for industrial purposes, it served as agricultural land for nearby villagers.

== Landmarks ==
There are no nearby places to visit due to industries nearby but some places are in radius of 60 km.

- Tilyar Lake, Rohtak
- Rohtak Zoo, Rohtak
- Rose Garden, Charkhi Dadri

== Location ==
Jharli is situated in Jhajjar, Haryana, India. Its geographical coordinates are 28° 31' 0" North, 76° 23' 0" East. Its original name (with diacritics) is Jhārli.

=== Climate ===
The climate in Jharli is referred to as a local steppe climate. During the year there is little rainfall. The average temperature in Jharli is 25.2 °C. The rainfall averages 476 mm. The temperatures are highest on average in June, at around 34.2 °C. January is the coldest month, with temperatures averaging 14.3 °C.

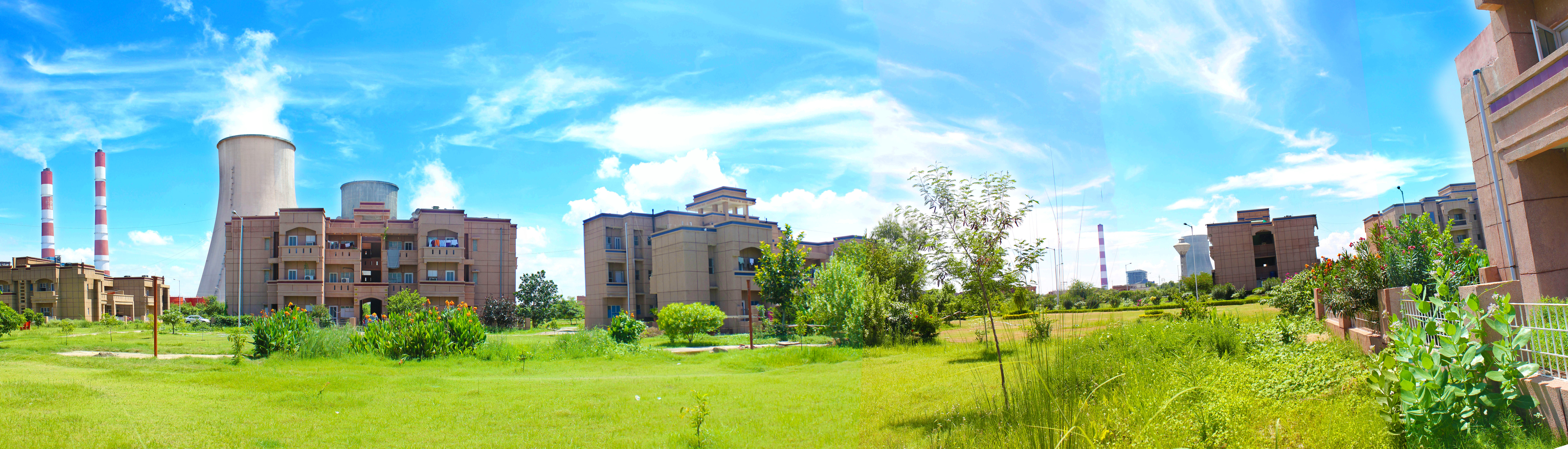
Jharli Power plant

== Transport ==
=== Road ===
Jharli is connected to these cities via road network:

- Delhi - 100 km
- Jaipur - 260 km
- Rohtak - 50 km

=== Railways ===
Jharli is connected to these cities via railways network:

- Hisar
- Rewari
- Sirsa
- Bhiwani
- New Delhi

== Education ==
Jharli has some educational institutes nearby, including:

- Bal Bharati Public School, NTPC Township
- RED, Chhuchhakwas
- GD Goenka, Chhuchhakwas
- Petals Nursery School, NTPC Township
- H.D.Sr.Sec.School, Salhawas
