= Badagi =

Badagi or Badgi may refer to:

- Badagi, Belgaum, a village in Belgaum District, Karnataka, India
- Badagi, Bagalkot, a panchayat village in Bilagi Taluka, Bagalkot District, Karnataka, India
- Badagi, Uttara Kannada, a village in Sirsi Taluka, Uttara Kannada District, Karnataka, India
