= Yadahalli Chinkara Wildlife Sanctuary =

Wildlife sanctuary in Karnataka

- IUCN category IV (habitat/species management area)
- A chinkara

- Location within Karnataka Location within India
- Interactive map of Yadahalli Chinkara Wildlife Sanctuary
- Location: Karnataka, India
- Coordinates: 16°22′45″N 75°26′54″E
- Area: 96.3691 km^{2} (37.2 sq mi)
- Established: 2016
- Governing body: Department of forests, Government of Karnataka

Yadahalli Chinkara Wildlife Sanctuary is a wildlife sanctuary in Karnataka India, aimed for the protection of chinkaras (Indian Gazelle). Established in 2016, it is the first chinkara sanctuary in Karnataka.

== History ==
Established in 2016, it is the first chinkara sanctuary in Karnataka.

== Description ==
The sanctuary is located in Bilagi and Mudhol taluks in the Bagalkot district of Karnataka, India and covers an area of 96.3691 km^{2} (37.2083 sq mi). Sanctuary gets its name from the village Yadahalli in Bilagi.

The Ghataprabha River flows in the southern part of the sanctuary, while the Krishna River in the northern part.

== Flora and fauna ==
The forest in the sanctuary contains more than 80 tree species belonging to 67 genera in 34 families out of which three species are endemic to Peninsular India. Among the trees found here four species are graded as Vulnerable (VU), and one is graded Near Threatened (NT) at global level.

In the state of Karnataka, apart from the Yadahalli Wildlife Sanctuary, chinkaras are recorded only in Bukkapatna Chinkara Wildlife Sanctuary. Other than chinkaras, mammals seen here include wolves, jackals, wildcats and stripped hyenas. It is also home to many butterfly species, bees, birds, reptiles and spiders.

== Threats and precautionary measures ==
This was a shrub forest that has seen some damage due to plantations. It is hoped that the status of the wildlife sanctuary given to the forest ensured an end to the commercial exploitation of the area. The threat of poachers was a major problem for the sanctuary. As hunting was restricted by various measures, the number of chinkaras and other mammals increased within this range. It is said that the number of chinkaras, which was 85 in 2016, increased to 92 in 2022.
