= Rohtak Zoo =

Tilyar Mini Zoo, Rohtak
- Endangered wildlife breeding
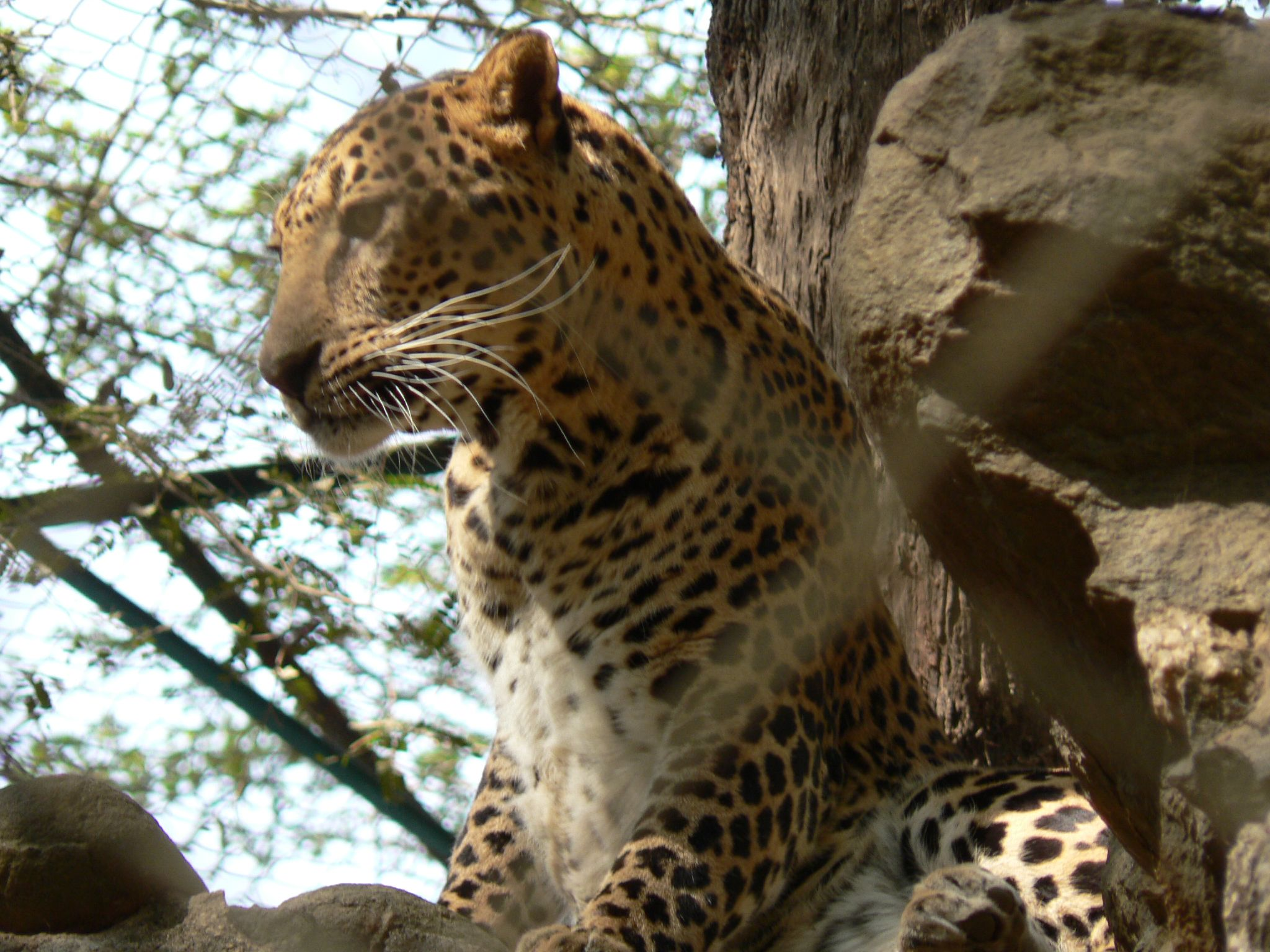

- Location in Haryana, India Tilyar Mini Zoo, Rohtak (India)
- Coordinates: 28°52′44″N 76°38′09″E
- Country: India
- State: Haryana
- District: Rohtak district
- Established: 2001

Government
  - Type: Government of Haryana
  - Body: Forests Department, Haryana

Languages
  - Official: Hindi
- Time zone: UTC+5:30 (IST)
- Website: www.haryanaforest.gov.in

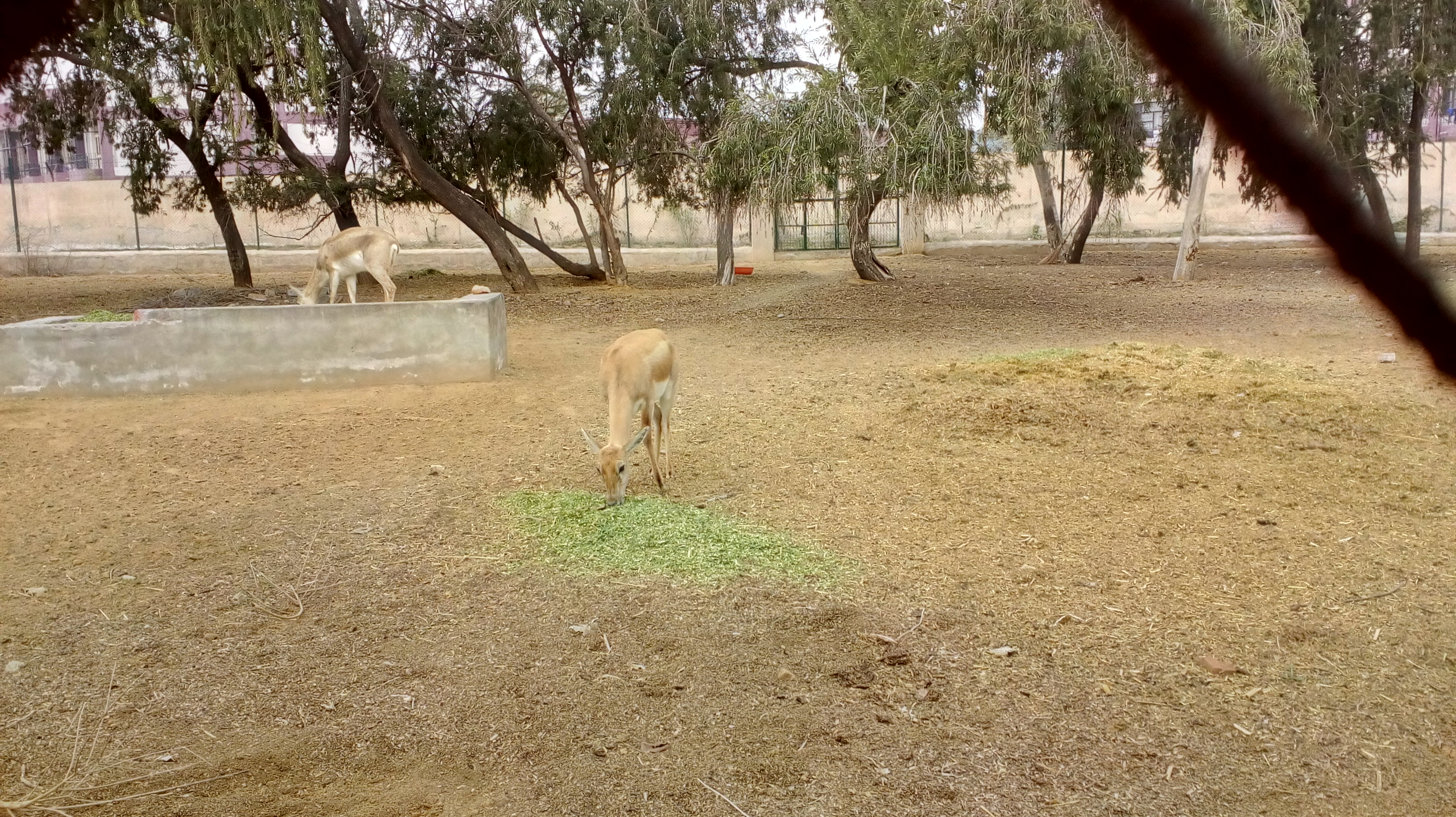
Female antelope grazing at Rohtak mini zoo

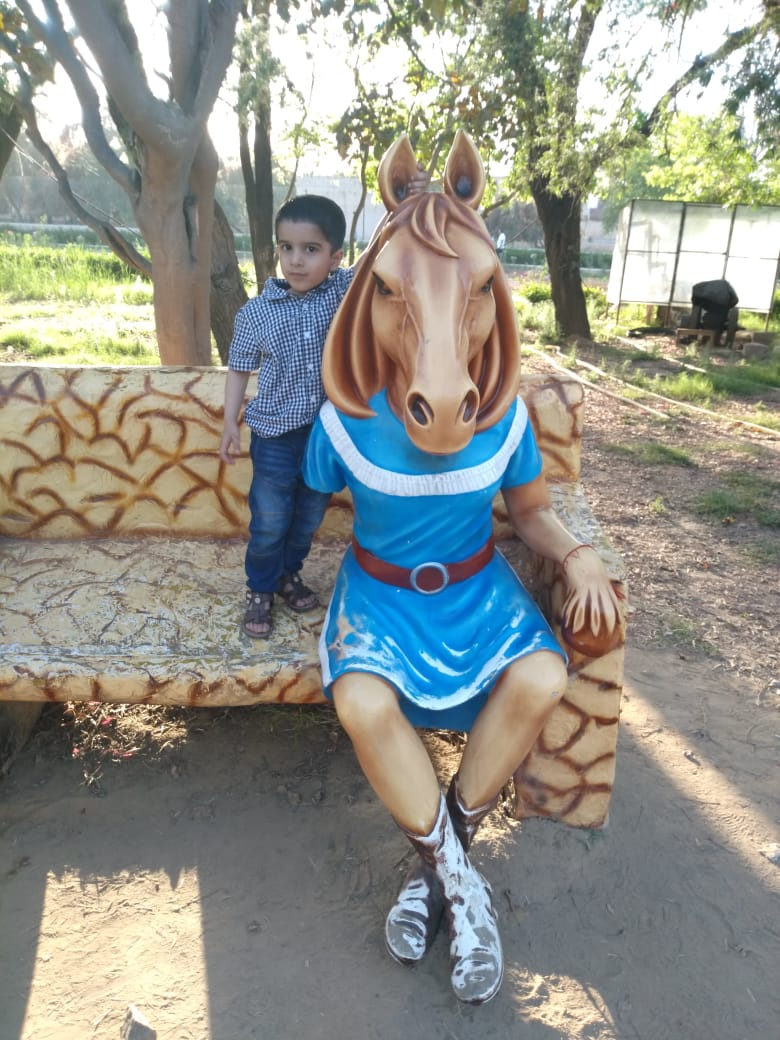
Horse mascot at Tilyar lake complex Inside Mini Zoo

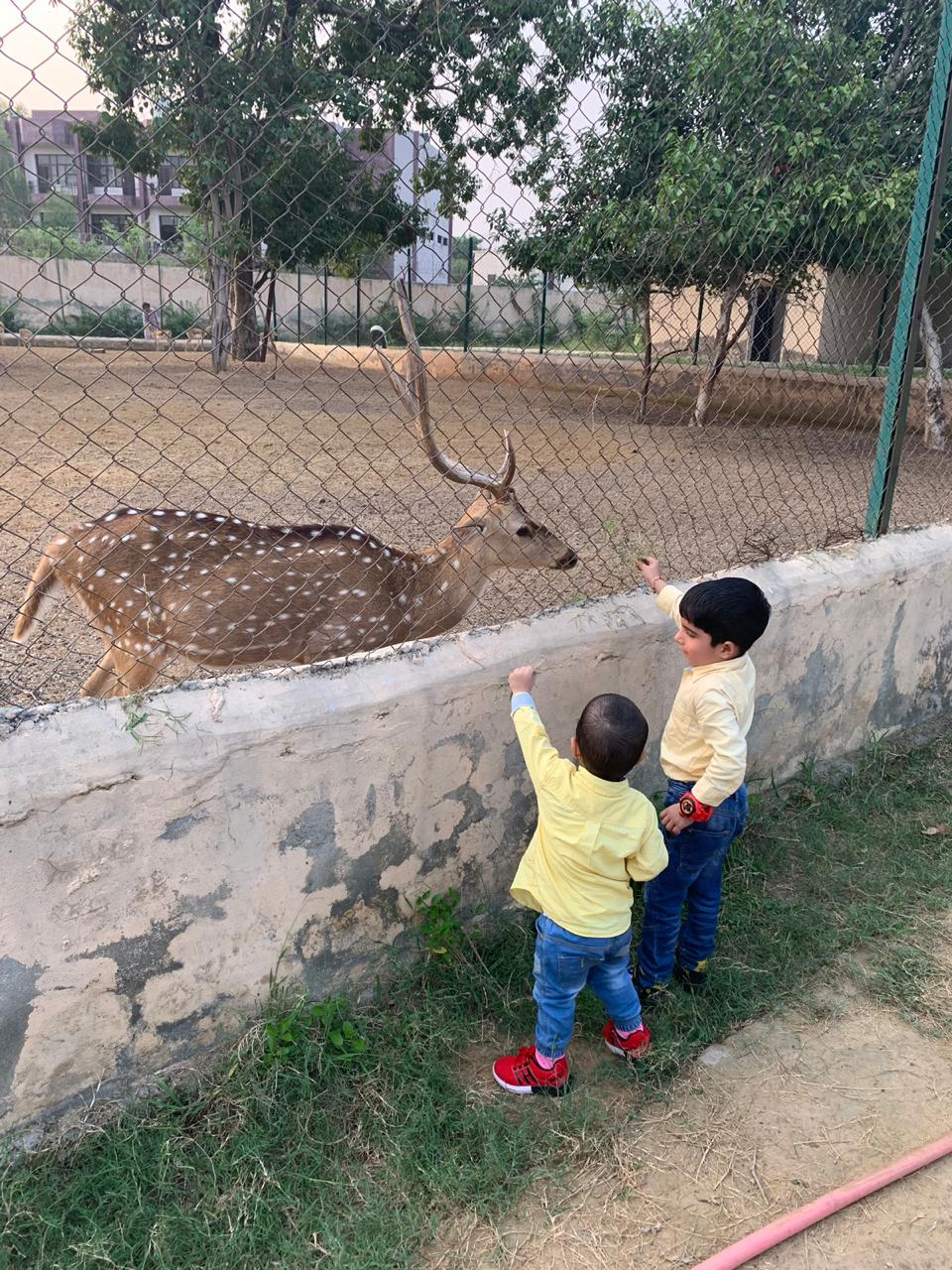
Rohtak Mini Zoo offers a structured, fun and hands-on learning environment for kids.

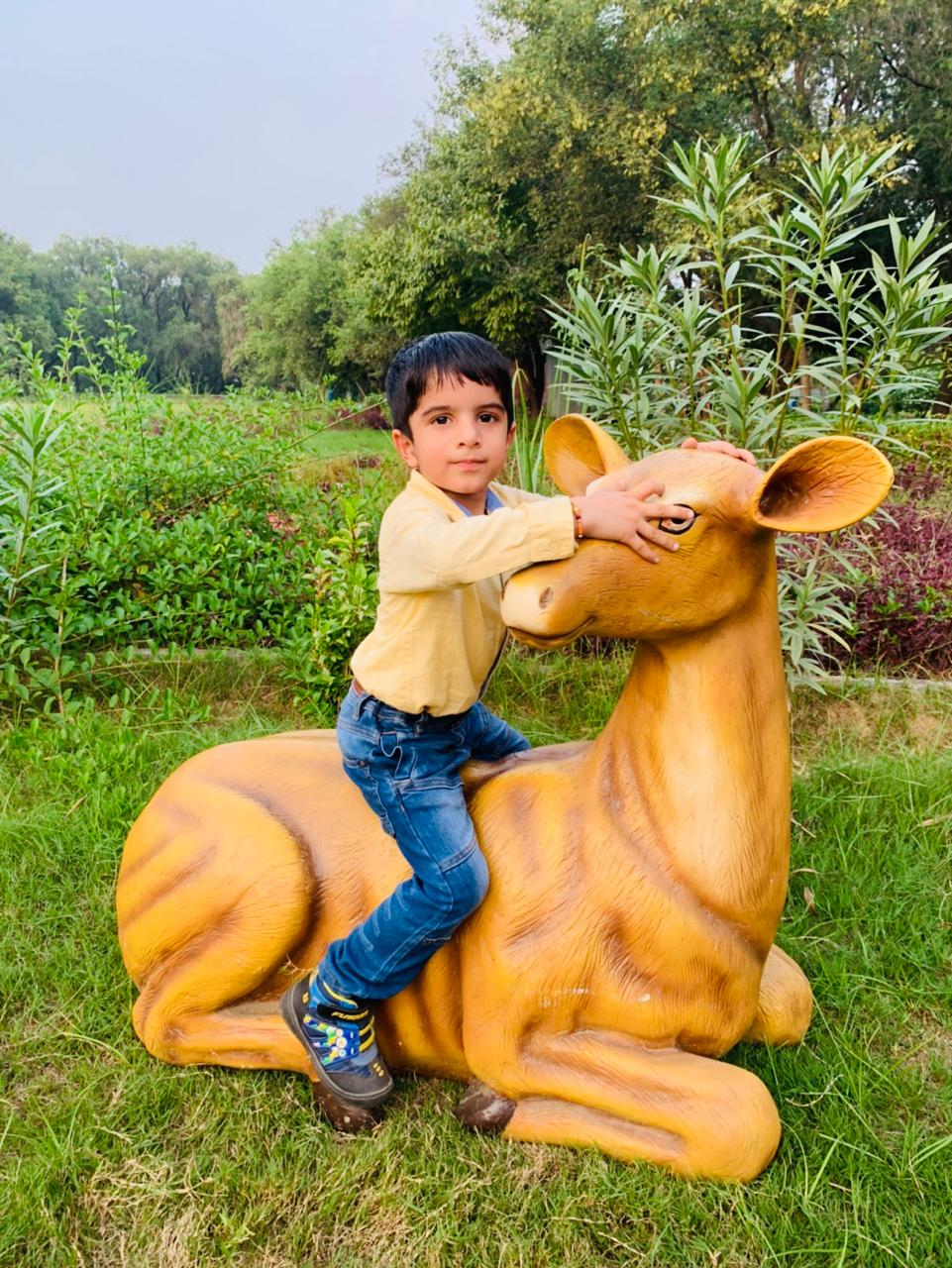
Rohtak mini zoo provides a tremendous opportunity and space for children to play and learn.

The Tilyar Mini Zoo, Rohtak is located inside the Tilyar Lake complex on Delhi Road in Rohtak, Haryana, India. This zoo was built in the year 1987.

The Tilyar Zoo at Rohtak is 42 km from Delhi border and the zoo is well maintained. Fishing is permissible at Tilyar Lake after paying ₹200 (US$2.10) fishing fee.

== Mini zoo ==
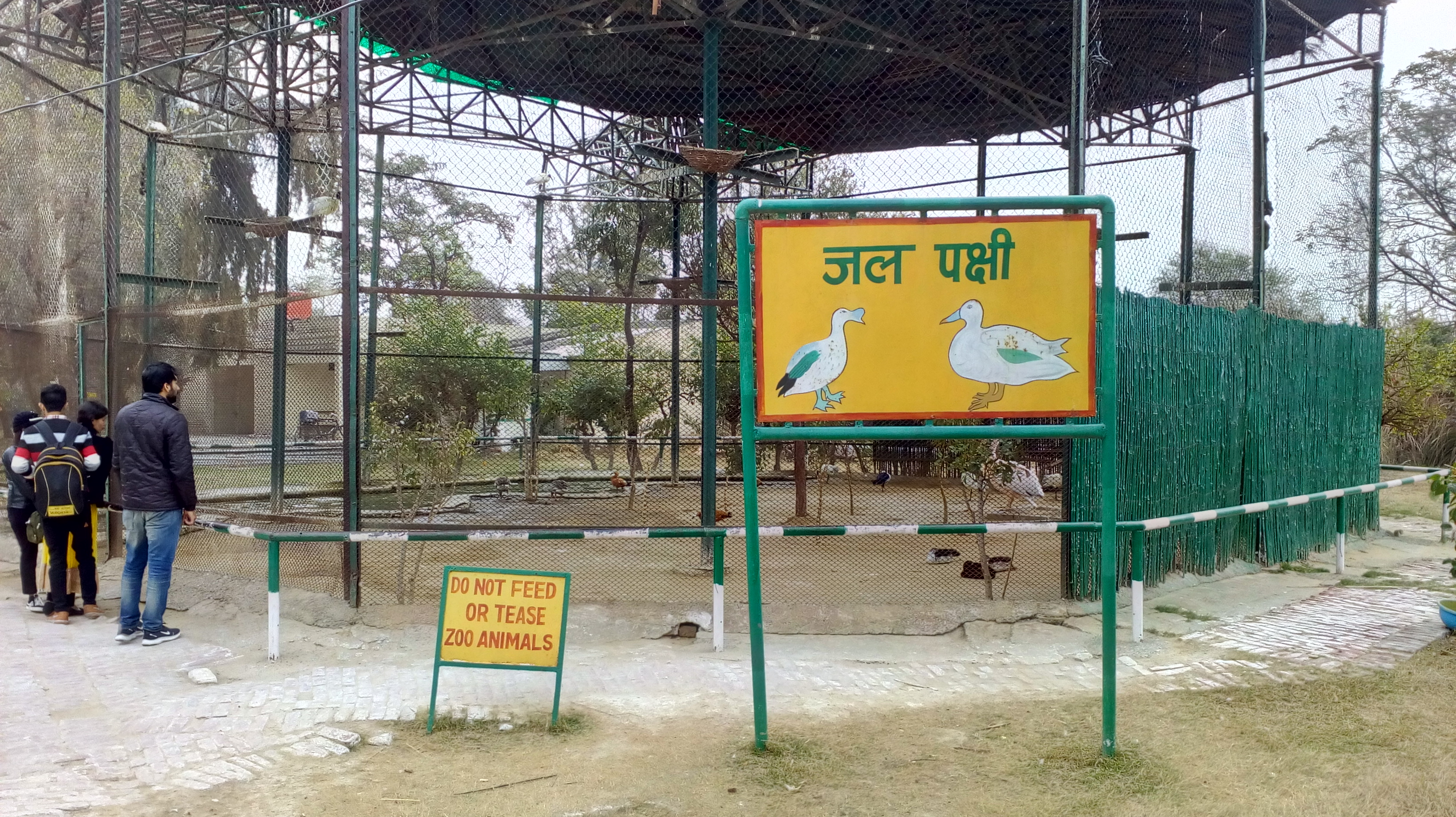
Pelican enclosure at Rohtak Mini Zoo

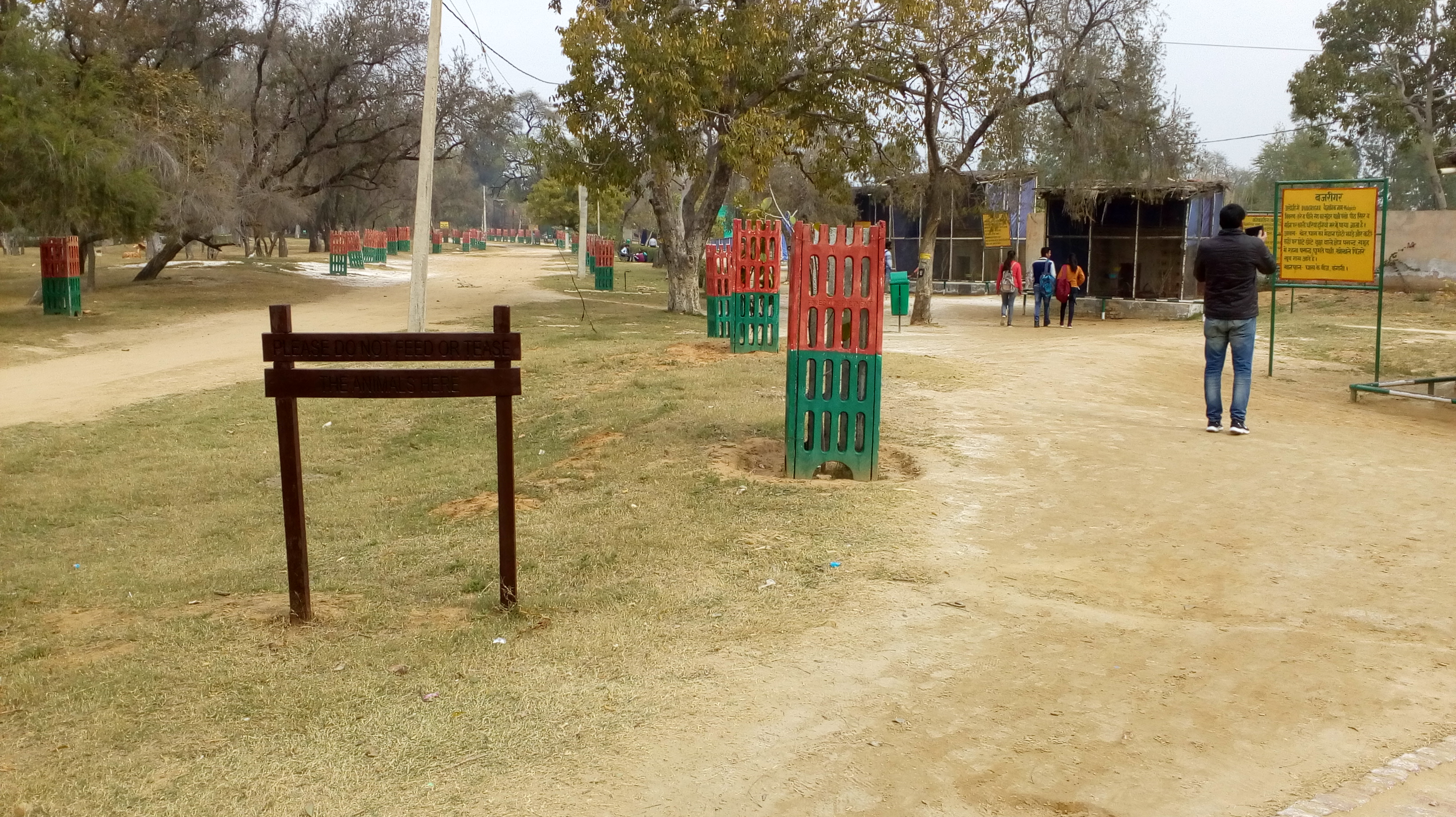
Enclosure at Tilyar Mini Zoo along with 'Please do not feed animals sign'

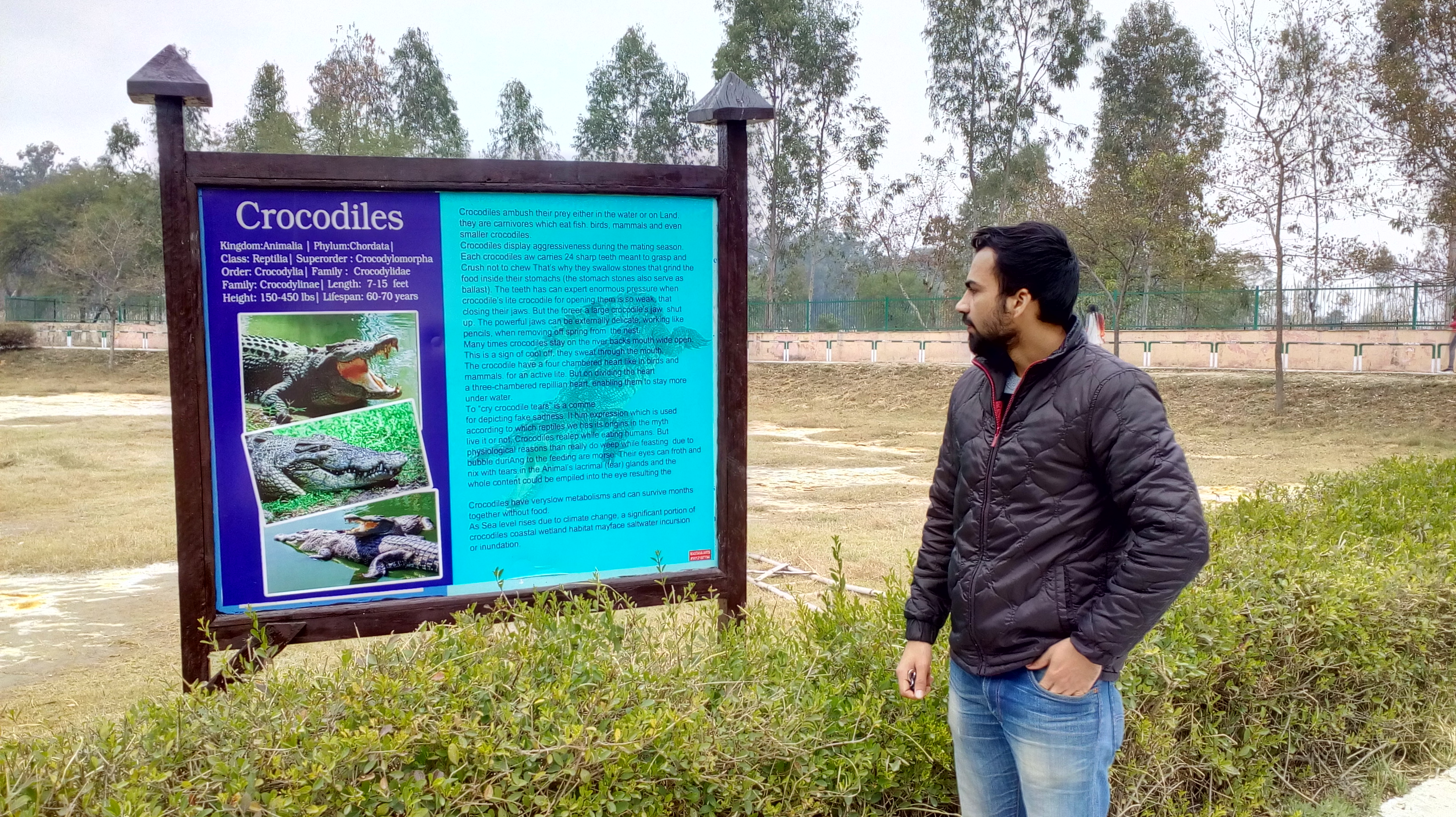
Crocodile inscription at Mini Zoo

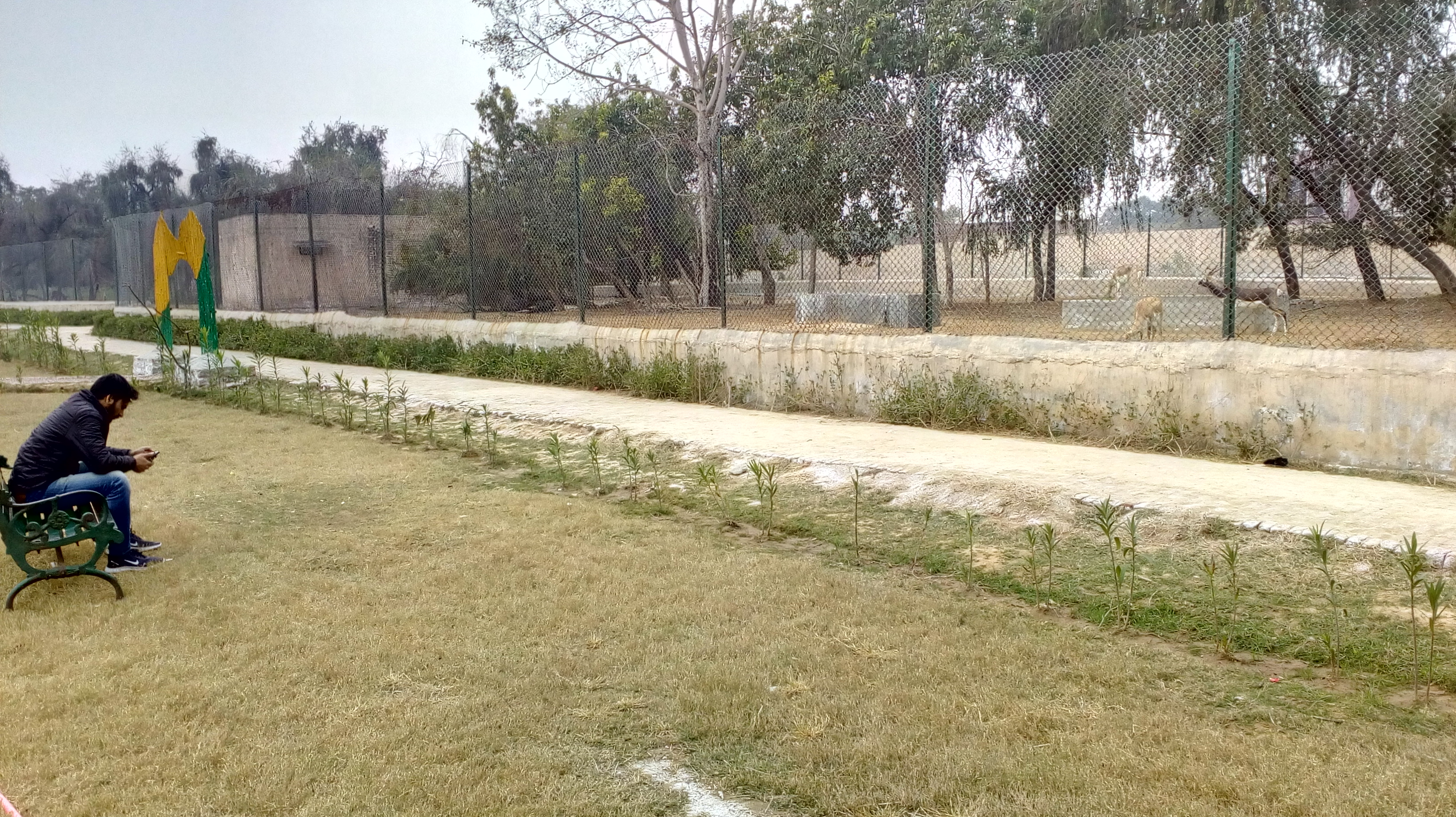
Antelope enclosure at Mini Zoo

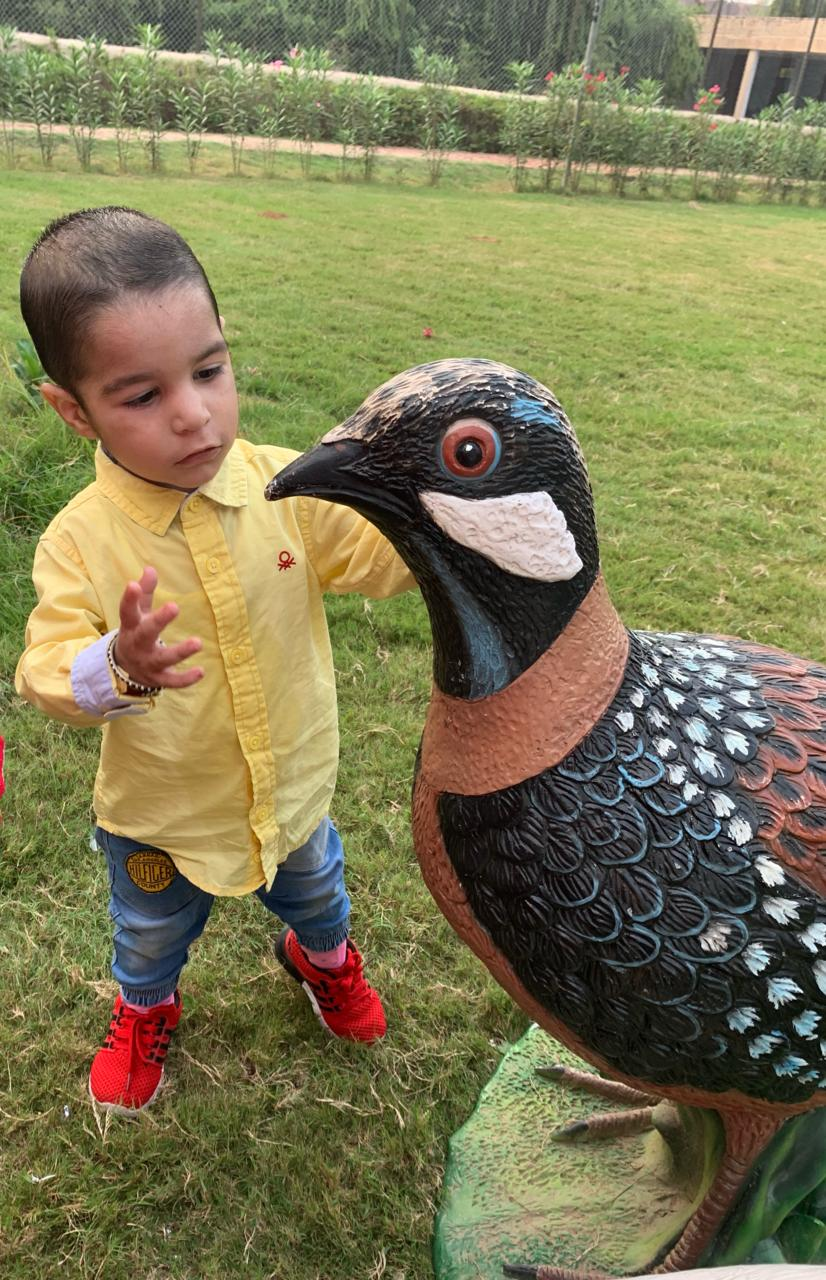
A child intrigued by a model of a Black Francolin, the state bird of Haryana

Haryana had many mini zoos spread across the state. In 2001 the Government of Haryana decided to shut these down and replace them with well developed viable zoos, this included setting up the zoo at Rohtak within Tilyar Lake complex.

As a result, enclosures for housing animals and aviaries for birds were built. Visitor facilities such as landscaping, walkways and trials, gardens, hillocks, lakes, artificial waterfalls, cafe, visitor toilets and resting shelters, watch towers, drinking water facilities, etc. were created.

The following animals have been housed in this zoo:

- Tiger
- Leopard
- Fox
- Hyena
- Wolf
- Gharial
- Mugger
- Jackal
- Otter
- Pig-tailed monkey
- Baboon
- Bonnet macaque
- Gray langur
- Sambhar
- Blackbuck
- Chinkara
- Indian hog deer
- Barking deer
- Guineafowl
- Silver pheasant
- Fantail pigeon
- Cockatiel
- Zebra finch

== Updates related to zoos in Haryana ==
- Deer Park, Hisar, founded in 1970-71, is oldest among zoos and deer parks in Haryana
- Haryana is now left with five tigers in captivity: two each in Mini Zoo, Bhiwani, and Rohtak Zoo and one in Pipali Zoo
- In 2003, a baby baboon was born in captivity in Pipali Zoo
- In 2009, tiger Apaya of Bhiwani zoo attacked and killed a tigress.
- In 2011, tiger Apaya of Bhiwani zoo entered the enclosure of another tigress Rani and attacked her. Rani died and was buried on the zoo premises.
- In 2011 another tiger Brondis had killed a caretaker in Bhiwani zoo.
- In 2014, 43 private school kids who were visiting Bhiwnai zoo were attacked by bees.
- In 2019, Rohtak Zoo gets two leopards – a four-year-old Varsha and a three-and-a-half-year-old Pawan

== Gallery ==
Species found at the zoo (pictures for representation only).

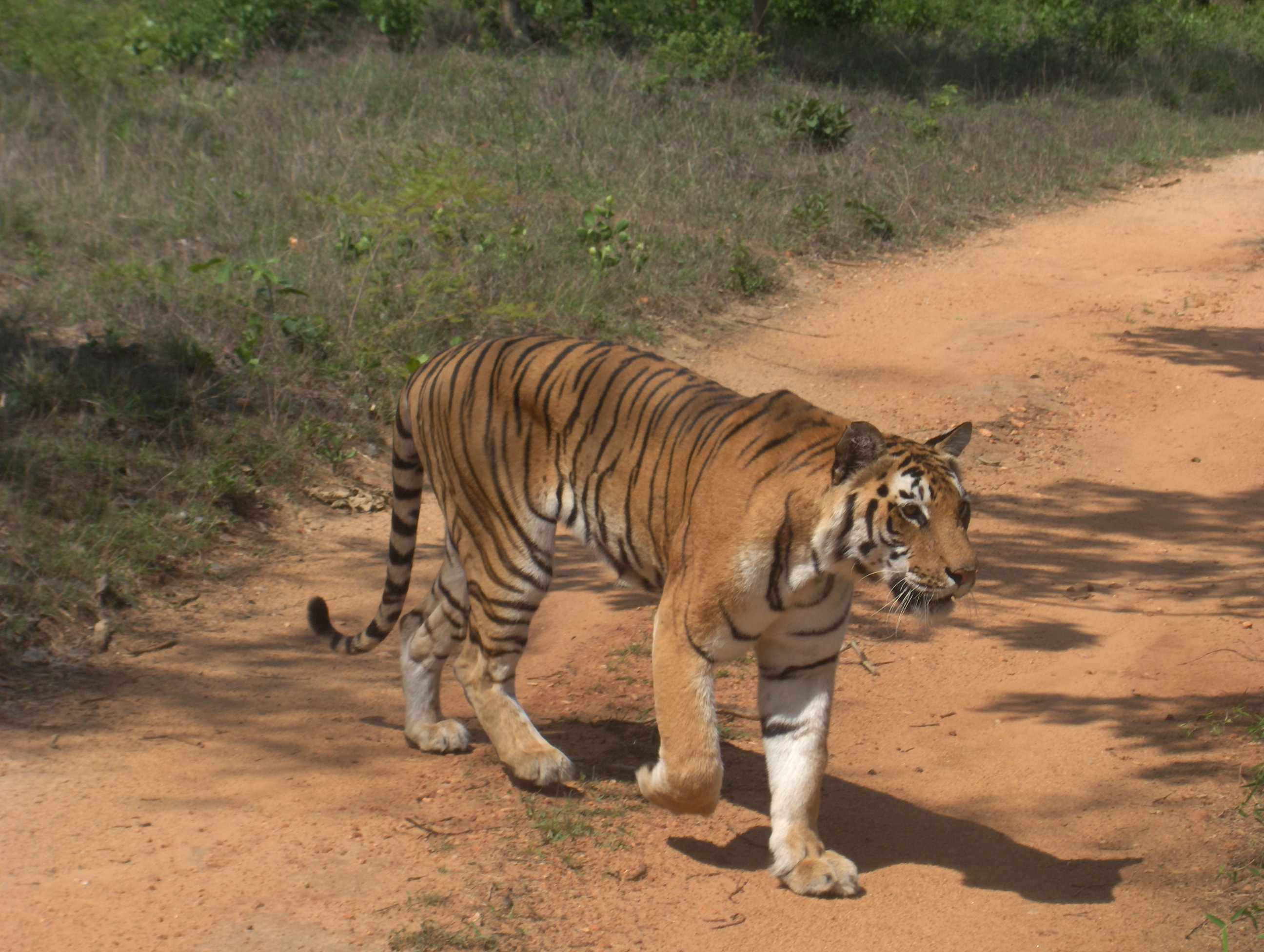
Tiger

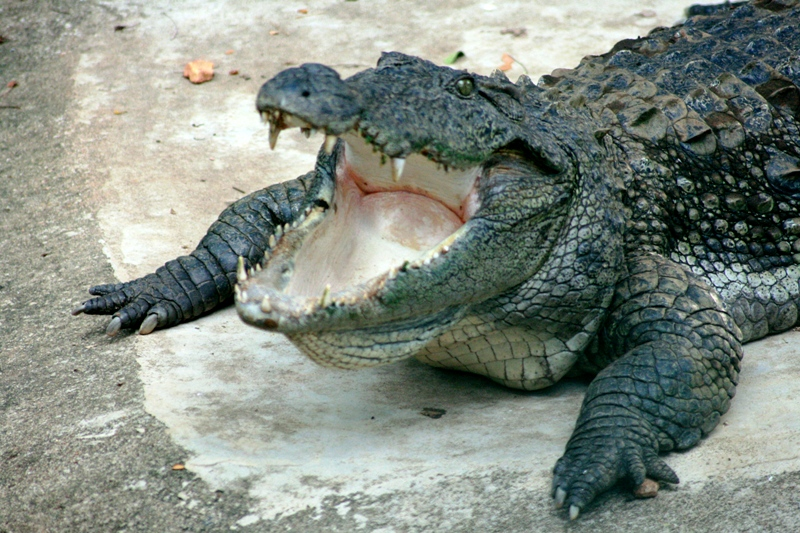
Mugger crocodile

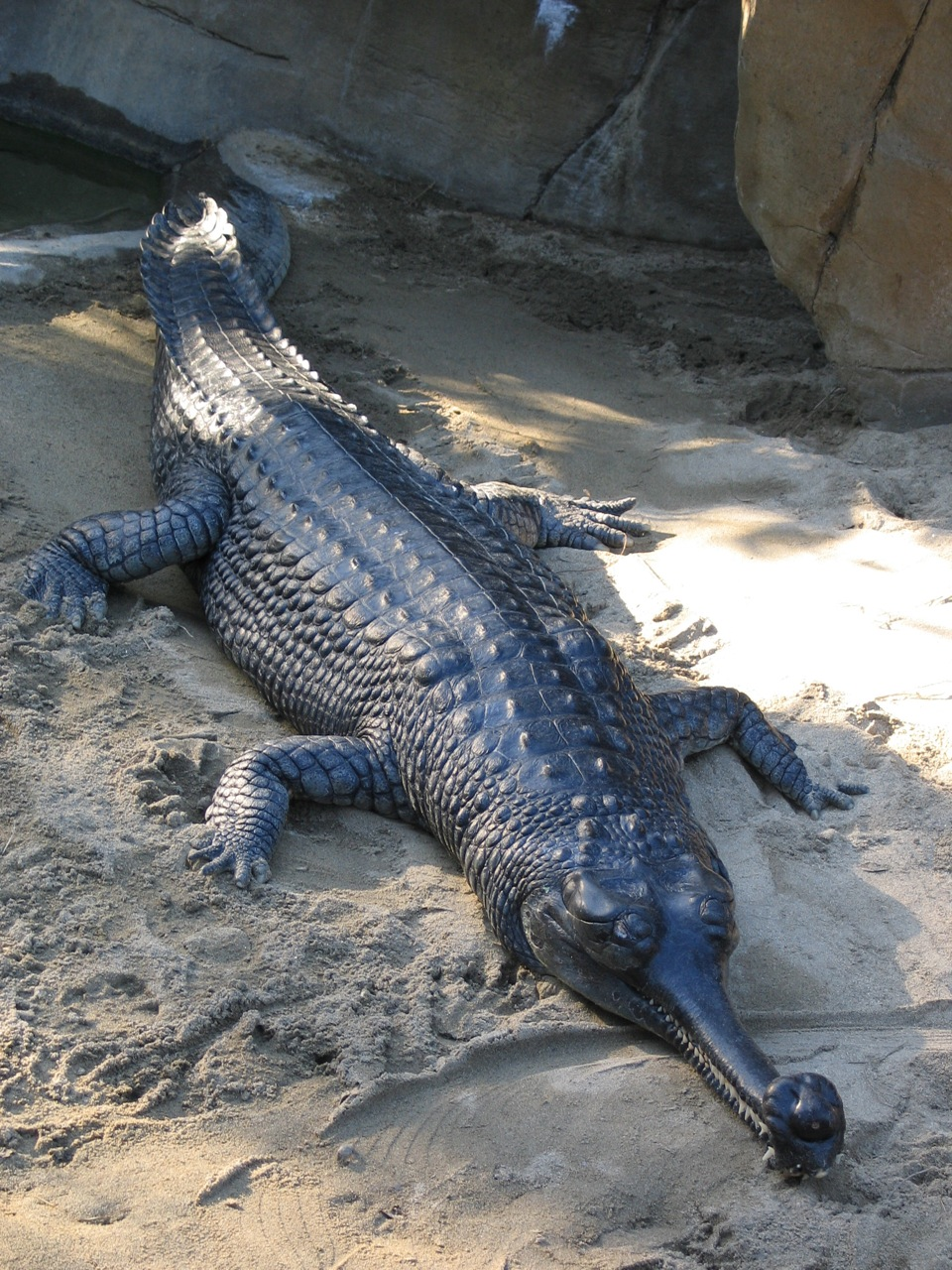
Gharial crocodile

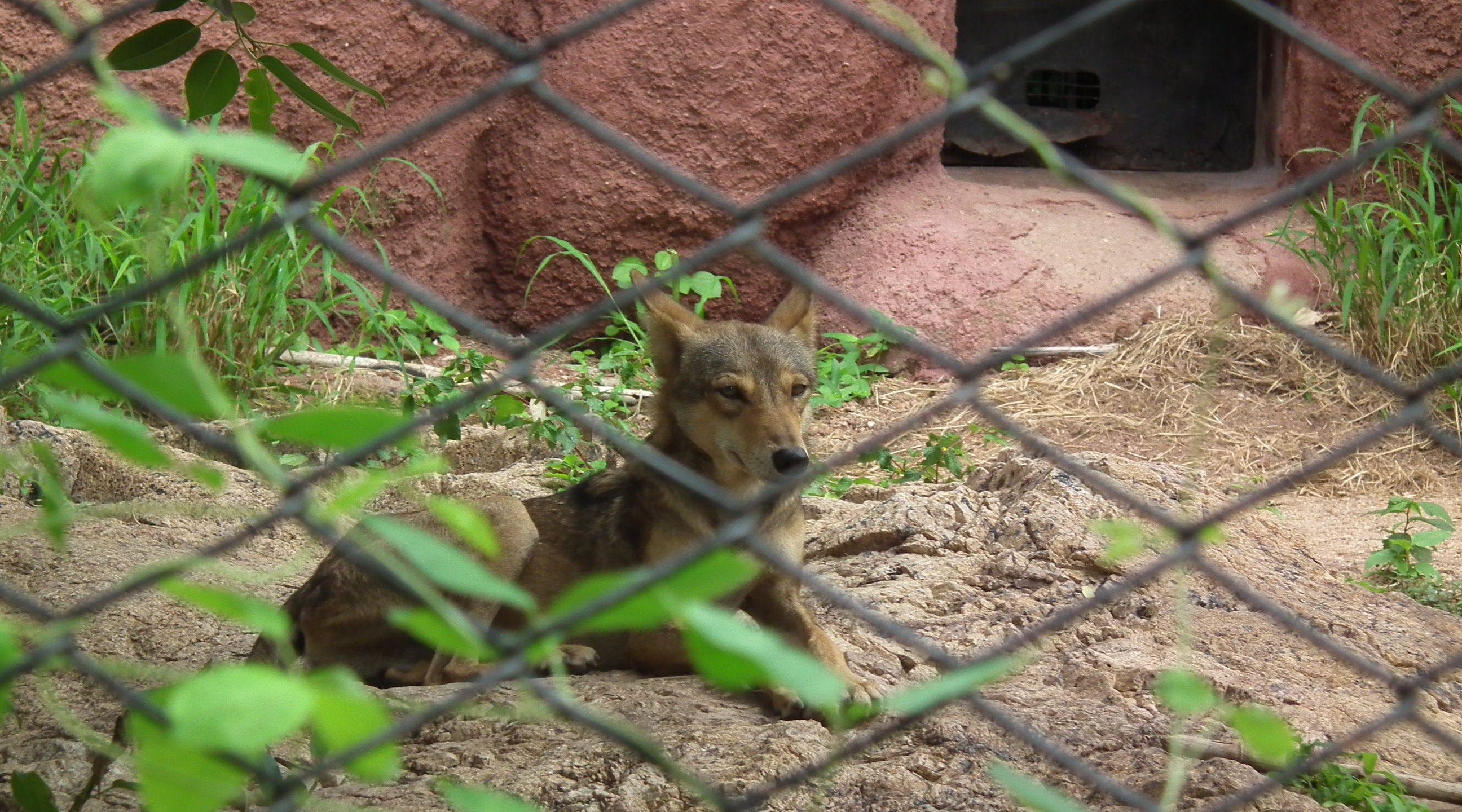
Fox

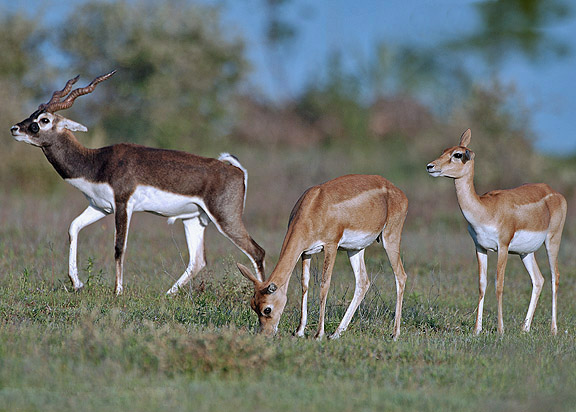
Male and female blackbucks

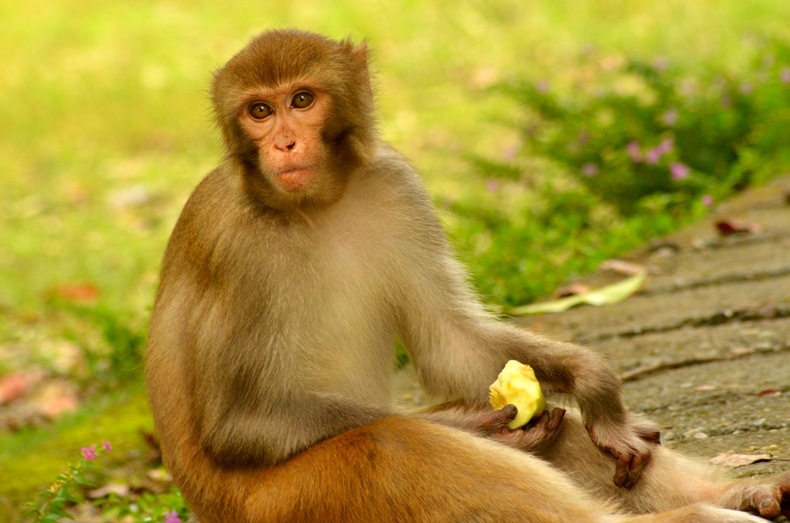
Monkeybonnet macaque

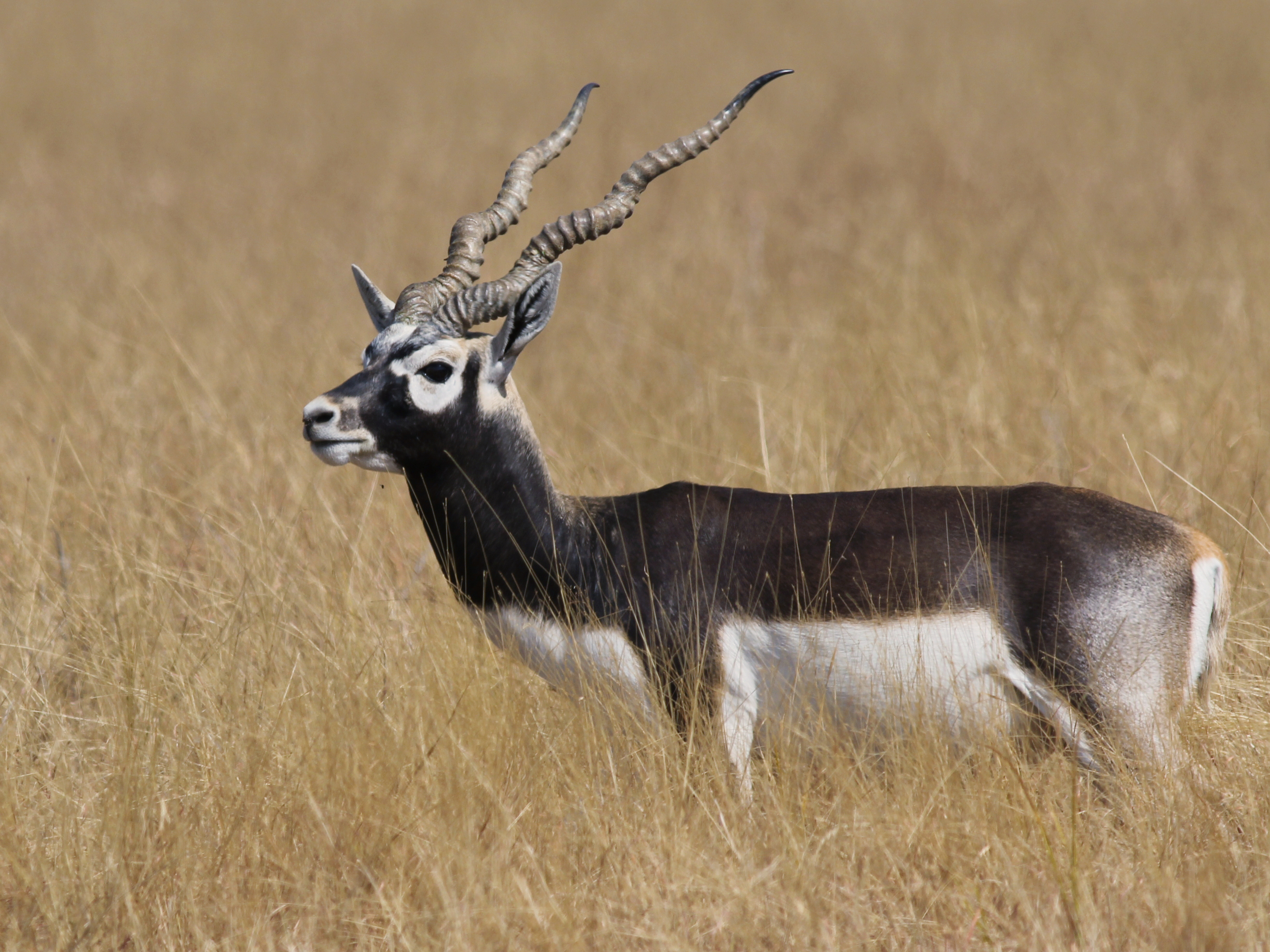
Antelope
