= Bukkapatna Chinkara Wildlife Sanctuary =

Wildlife sanctuary in Karnataka

- IUCN category IV (habitat/species management area)
- A chinkara

- Location within Karnataka Location within India
- Interactive map of Bukkapatna Chinkara Wildlife Sanctuary
- Location: Karnataka, India
- Coordinates: 13°38′59″N 76°44′48″E
- Area: 148 km^{2} (57.1 sq mi)
- Established: 2019
- Governing body: Department of forests, Government of Karnataka

Bukkapatna Chinkara Wildlife Sanctuary is a wildlife sanctuary in Karnataka India, which was founded to protect chinkaras (Indian Gazelle). Established in 2019, it is the second chinkara sanctuary in Karnataka after Yadahalli Chinkara Wildlife Sanctuary.

== History ==
Established in 2019 pranaya gmmb , it is the second chinkara sanctuary in Karnataka.

== Description ==
The sanctuary is located in Sira Taluk of Tumakuru district in Karnataka, India and covers an area of 148 km^{2} (57 sq mi). The sanctuary got its name from the village Bukkapatna in Sira Taluk.

== Flora and fauna ==
In the state of Karnataka, apart from the Bukkapatna Sanctuary, chinkaras are recorded only in Yadahalli Wildlife Sanctuary. In 2019, there are about 80 chinkaras in Bukkapatna area. Other than chinkaras, four-horned and blackbuck antelopes are also found here. Other than antelopes, more than 20 mammal species including Leopard, Dhole and Sloth bear, 12 amphibian species, 20 reptile species and more than 160 bird species are also seen in the sanctuary. The Indian egg-eating snake, which is endemic to the Indian subcontinent and declared as a Schedule-1 protected species by government of India under the Wildlife Protection Act, is also seen here.

== Threats and precautionary measures ==
The threat of poachers was a major problem for the forest here. It is hoped that the status of the wildlife sanctuary given to the forest ensured an end to the poaching, habitat loss and other threats to the forest.
