= Girisagar =

- village
- Location in Karnataka, India Girisagar (India)
- Coordinates: 16.3549°N 75.7030°E
- Country: India
- State: Karnataka
- District: Bagalkot
- Taluka: Bilagi

Population (2001)
  - Total: 6,420

Languages
  - Official: Kannada
- Time zone: UTC+5:30 (IST)
- Website: Bagalkot.nic.in

Girisagar is a village in the southern state of Karnataka, India. It is located in the Bilagi taluka of Bagalkot district in Karnataka.

== Demographics ==
As of 2001 India census, Girisagar had a population of 6,420 with 3,216 males and 3,204 females.

== See also ==
- Bagalkot
- Districts of Karnataka
