= Chinkara =

- Chinkara in Tal Chhapar Sanctuary, Rajasthan

Conservation status
- Least Concern (IUCN 3.1)
- CITES Appendix III

Scientific classification
- Kingdom: Animalia
- Phylum: Chordata
- Class: Mammalia
- Order: Artiodactyla
- Family: Bovidae
- Subfamily: Antilopinae
- Genus: Gazella
- Species: G. bennettii

Binomial name
- Gazella bennettii (Sykes, 1831)
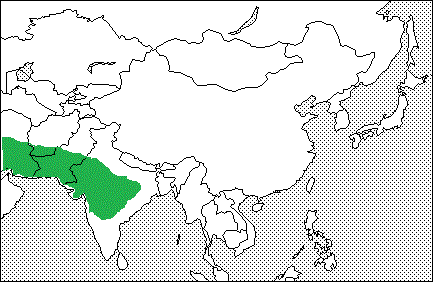
- Distribution map of chinkara

Species of gazelle

The chinkara (Gazella bennettii), also known as the Indian gazelle, is a gazelle species native to India, Iran, Afghanistan and Pakistan.

== Taxonomy ==
The following six subspecies are considered valid:

- Deccan chinkara (G. b. bennettii) (Sykes 1831) – ranges from South India, from the Ganges Valley (east to the borders of West Bengal) south at least to Hyderabad, Andhra Pradesh, Deccan Plateau;
- Gujarat chinkara (G. b. christii) (Blyth, 1842) – ranges from the desert lowlands of Pakistan, western India, Rann of Kutch, Kathiawar, Saurastra region and as far east of Ahmedabad district in Gujarat;
- Kennion gazelle, eastern jebeer gazelle or Baluchistan gazelle (G. b. fuscifrons) (Blanford, 1873) – occurs in eastern Iran, (southeast and along the Makran coast, Sistan and Baluchistan) southern Afghanistan, Pakistan, Balochistan Province to Sindh and northwestern India, Rajasthan, also the darkest subspecies;
- Bushehr gazelle (G. b. karamii) (Groves, 1993) – ranges in southwestern Iran, restricted near Bushehr, also the smallest subspecies;
- Jebeer gazelle, western jebeer gazelle or Shikari gazelle (G. b. shikarii) (Groves, 1993) – Lives in northeastern Iran, north and west-central districts (Touran, west to Tehran and southwest to Shiraz County and beyond), also the palest subspecies;
- Salt Range gazelle (G. b. salinarum) (Groves, 2003) – ranges in Pakistan, Punjab region and east as far as Delhi, Indian Punjab, Haryana in northwest India, salt range;

== Characteristics ==
It stands at 65 cm (26 in) tall and weighs about 23 kg (51 lb). It has a reddish-buff summer coat with smooth, glossy fur. In winter, the white belly and throat fur is in greater contrast. The sides of the face have dark chestnut stripes from the corner of the eye to the muzzle, bordered by white stripes. Chinkara have straight horns with prominent rings which reach over 39 cm (15 in). Both males and females have horn although females have shorter horns.

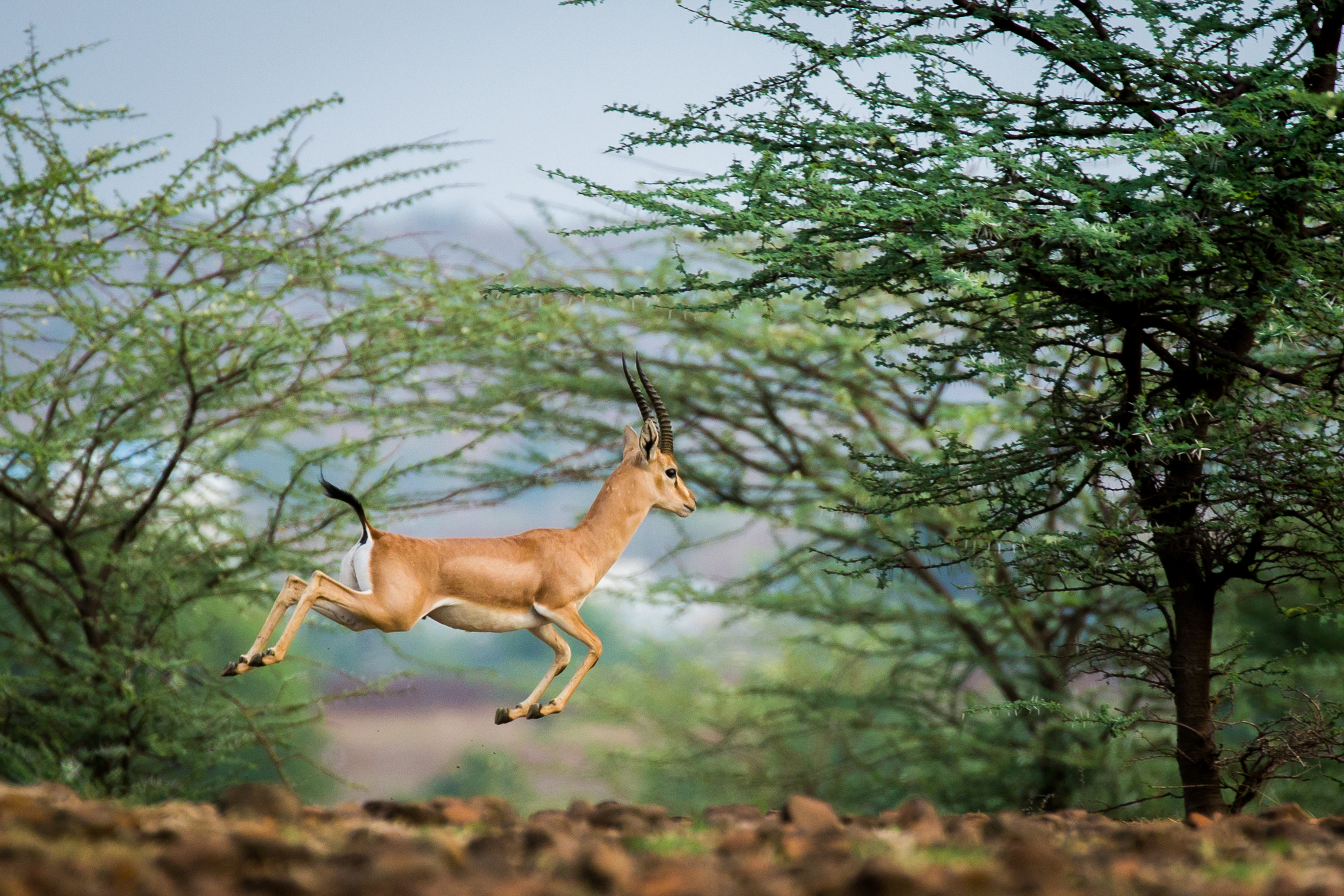
A chinkara at Mayureshwar Wildlife Sanctuary, Maharashtra, India

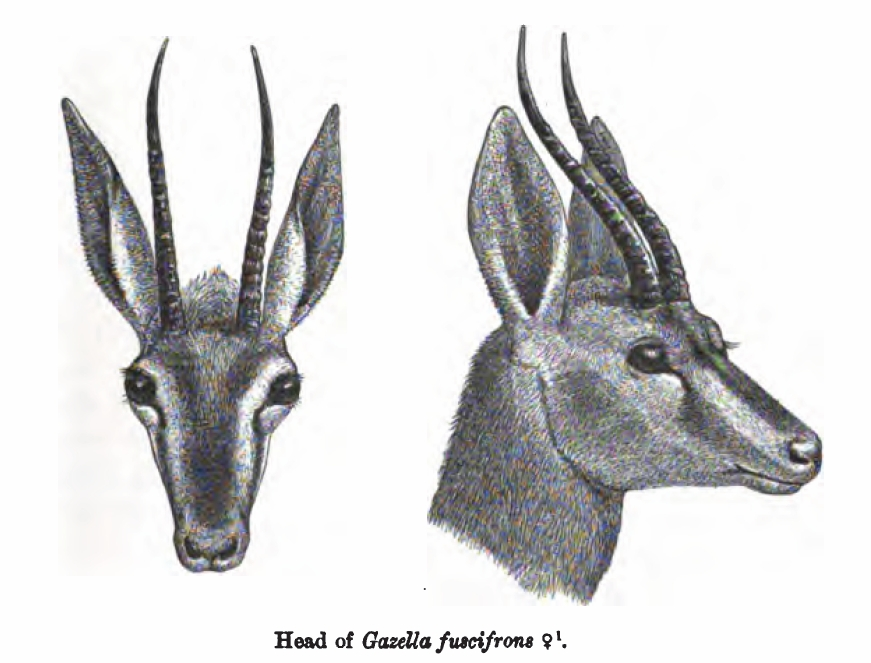
G. b. fuscifrons of Balochistan

== Distribution and habitat ==
Chinkara live on arid plains and hilly country, deserts, dry scrub and light or open forests, inhabiting more than 80 protected areas in India; they are most common in the states of Gujarat, Madhya Pradesh, Maharashtra and Rajasthan, though more sparse populations are also known from Andhra Pradesh, Karnataka and Telangana, in South India. In Pakistan, they range at elevations of up to 1,500 m (4,900 ft), and may be found as far north as Punjab Province and as far south as Kirthar National Park, near Karachi, Sindh. In Iran, their largest population is at Kavir National Park, south of Tehran, though they are also found further south and east in Dar-e Anjir Wildlife Refuge (Yazd) and Bakhtegan National Park (east of Shiraz).

In 2001, the Indian chinkara population was estimated at 100,000 animals, with 80,000 living in the west of the country and in the Thar Desert. The population in Pakistan is highly scattered, and has been severely reduced by hunting, as is the case in Iran; in Afghanistan, chinkara are very rare and likely only seldomly seen in the southern parts of the country.

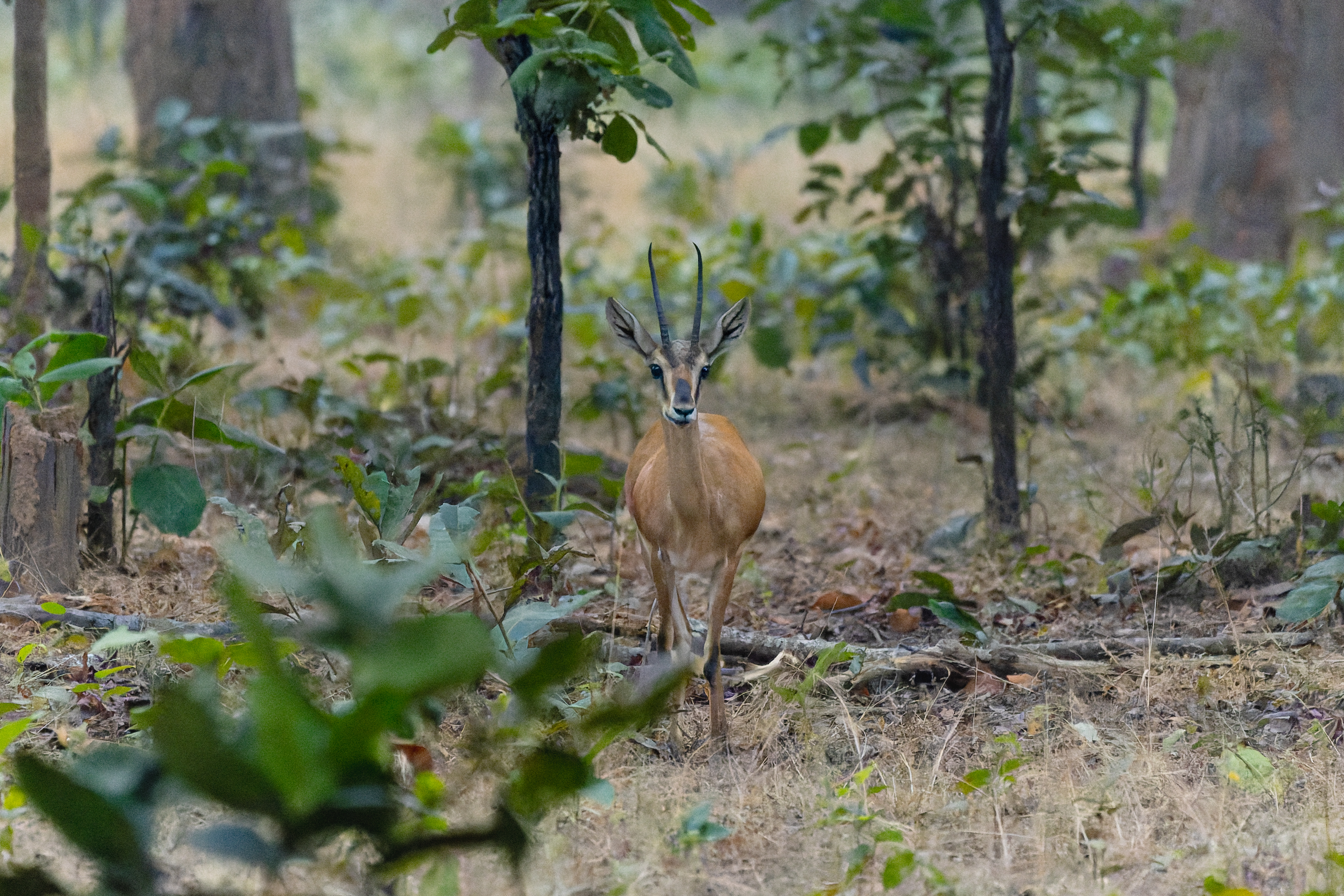
A chinkara in Sanjay Dubri Tiger Reserve, Madhya Pradesh

== Behaviour and ecology ==
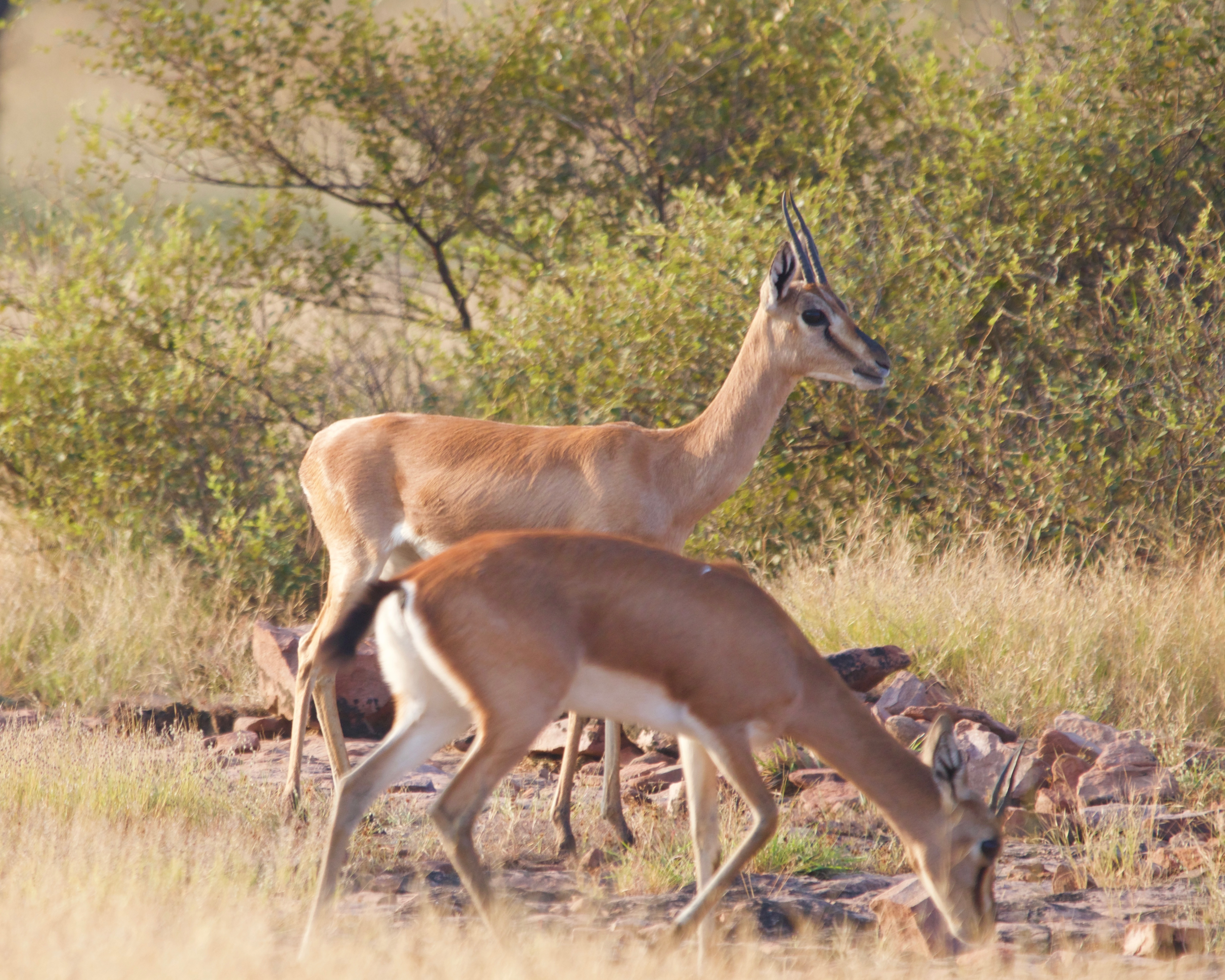
Two chinkara does in Ranthambore National Park, Rajasthan, India

Chinkara are swift and agile and maintain nocturnal and crepuscular habits, with most feeding occurring during the evening. They are browsers and consume leaves and grasses, typically being observed alone or in small groups or pairings, such as mother and offspring. Occasionally, small herds of several individuals are observed. The Indian gazelle is considered polygamous; males are territorial and protect their areas from intrusion. Two breeding seasons occur during the year, one at the end of the rainy season and another at the end of spring; females endure a gestation period of 5-5.5 months and give birth to one offspring, sometimes twins. The calves stay with their mother for up to 12 months.

The chinkara is preyed upon by the Indian leopard, Bengal tiger, Asiatic lion (in Gujarat), Indian wolf, golden jackal and packs of dhole. In rarer cases, unattended calves, and even mature gazelles, may be consumed by Indian pythons; mugger crocodiles are another threat, especially when during dry seasons or when drinking at crocodile-inhabited water sources. Outside of protected areas, they may be pursued by feral and pariah dogs. In Madhya Pradesh's Kuno National Park, they are likely hunted by cheetahs, as a population of South African cheetahs has been imported to the region in an effort to repopulate India with the wild cats; the last Asiatic cheetah in India was killed in the early 20th century, with only 100 or less surviving in Iran.

== Threats ==
The chinkara is threatened by extensive hunting for meat and trophies in Afghanistan, Iran and Pakistan. Other threats include habitat loss due to agricultural and industrial expansion. The status in these countries is unclear. Around 1,300 individuals occur in Iran. In 2001, the chinkara population in India was estimated at over 100,000 individuals, of which nearly 80,000 occurred in the Thar Desert. However, the population has declined since then. The chinkara is listed as least concern on the IUCN Red List.

In 1993, a controversy erupted when the Government of Gujarat issued a decree to denotify the Narayan Sarovar Sanctuary, that contains a small population of chinkara, to allow mining of lignite, limestone, bentonite and bauxite inside the sanctuary. This was, however, rejected by the Gujarat High Court, and the sanctuary was restored to its earlier limits.

== Conservation ==
The chinkara is protected in Iran and Pakistan. It occurs in over 80 protected areas in India. In January 2016, the Government of Karnataka issued a notification to establish a sanctuary especially for chinkara in the Yadahalli village in the Bagalkot district of the state. This region shelters a major population of chinkara. The Karnataka Government also notified the Bukkapatna Chinkara Wildlife Sanctuary in Tumakuru district in May 2019.

== See also ==
- Yadahalli Chinkara Wildlife Sanctuary
