= Mayureshwar Wildlife Sanctuary =

Wildlife sanctuary in Maharashtra, India

Mayureswar Wildlife Sanctuary
- IUCN category IV (habitat/species management area)
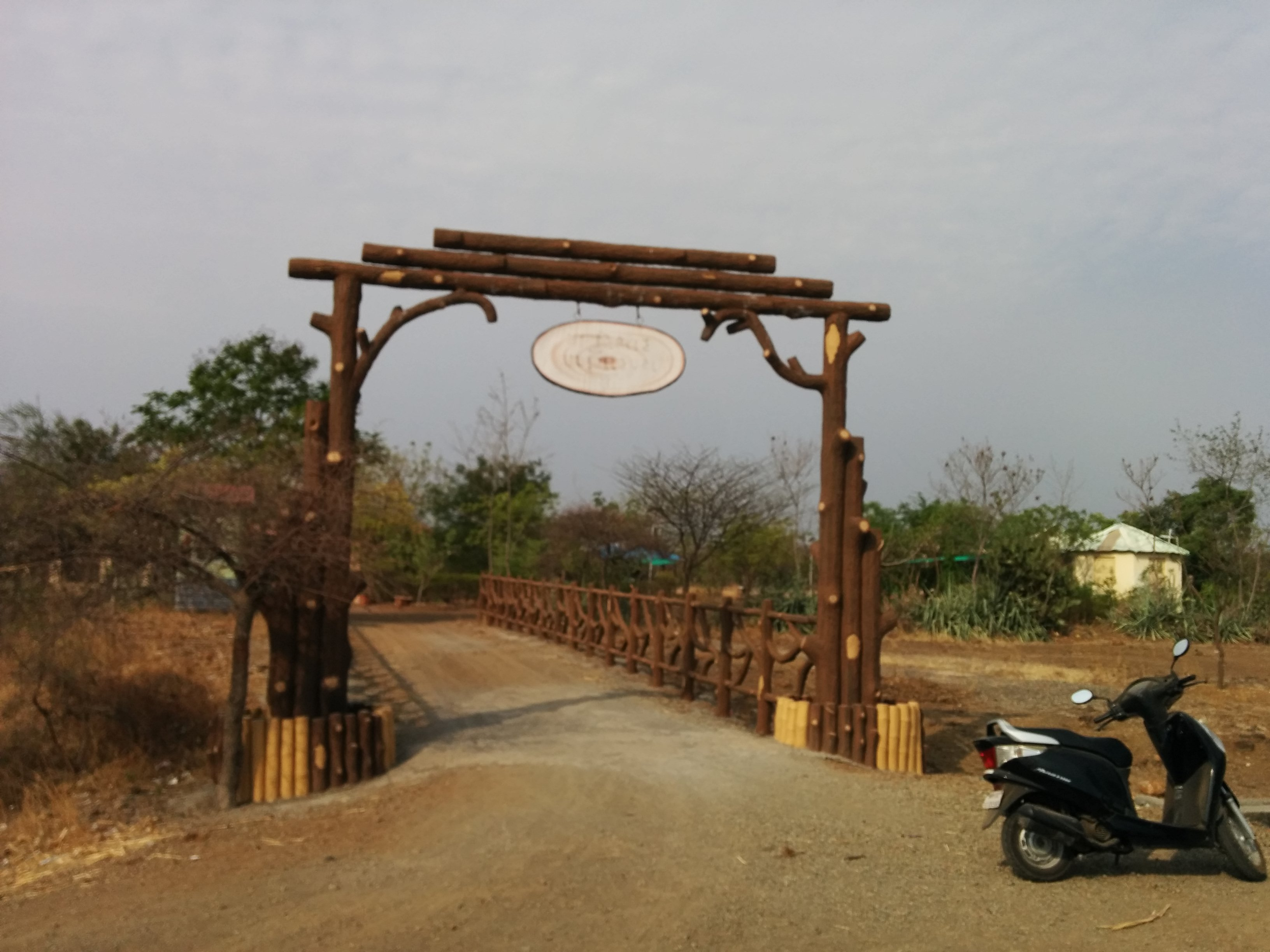
- Entrance to the Mayureshwar Wildlife Sanctuary forest office

- Location within Maharashtra Location within India
- Interactive map of Mayureswar Wildlife Sanctuary
- Location: Maharashtra, India
- Nearest city: Pune
- Coordinates: 18°20′6″N 74°22′15″E
- Area: 5.14 km^{2} (1.98 mi^{2})
- Established: August 1997

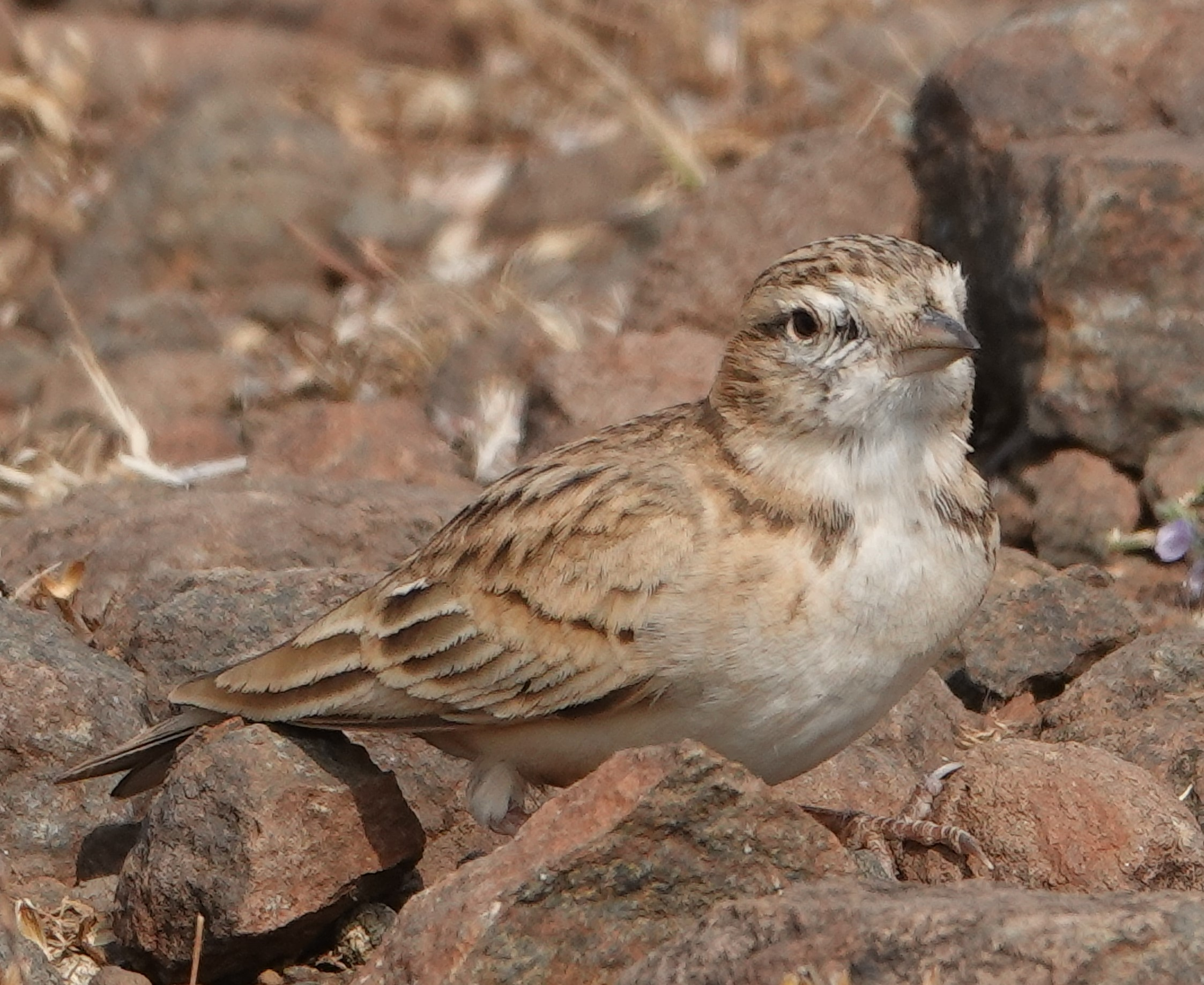
Sykes's Short-toed Lark Calandrella dukhunensis

Mayureswar Wildlife Sanctuary is located in Tehsil Baramati in Pune district in Maharashtra, India. It is 74 km from Pune and 35 km from Daund.

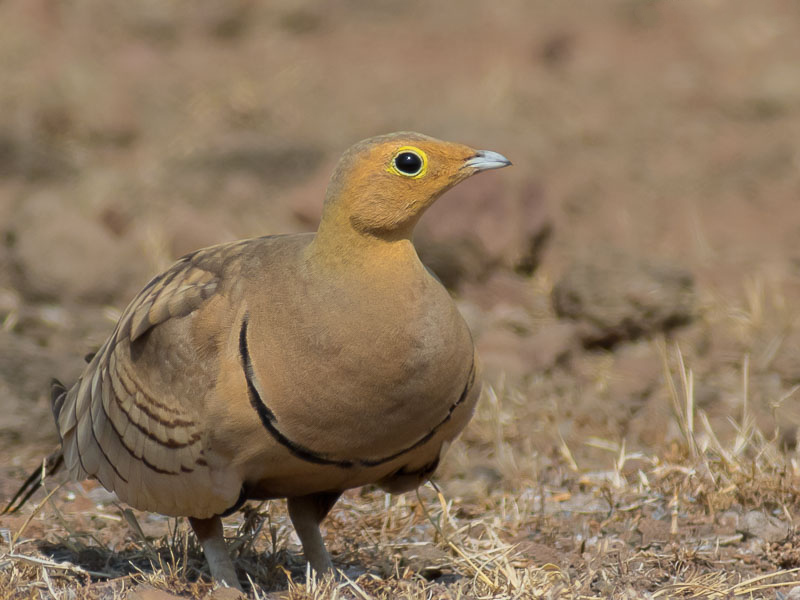
Chestnut-bellied Sandgrouse

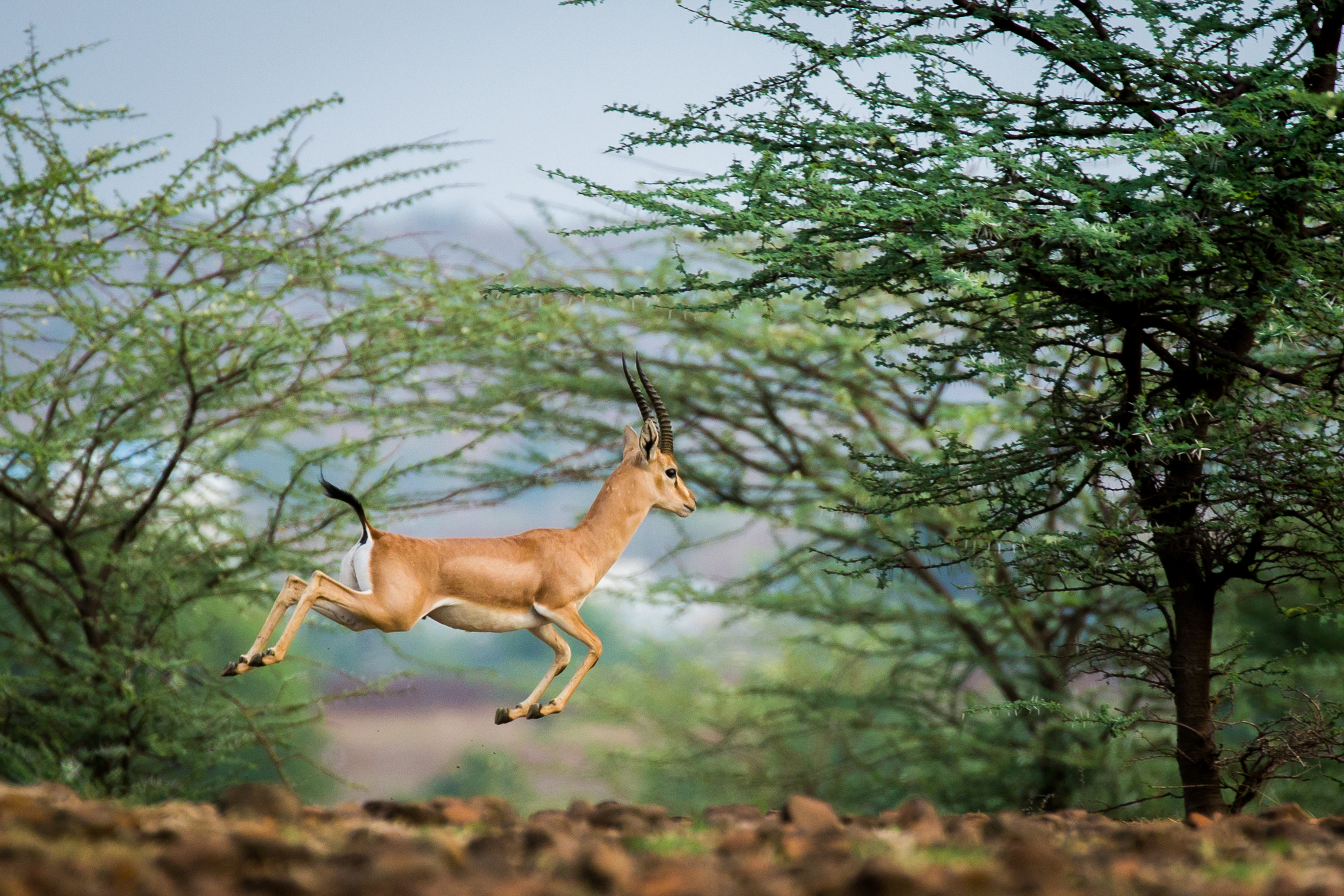
Chinkara

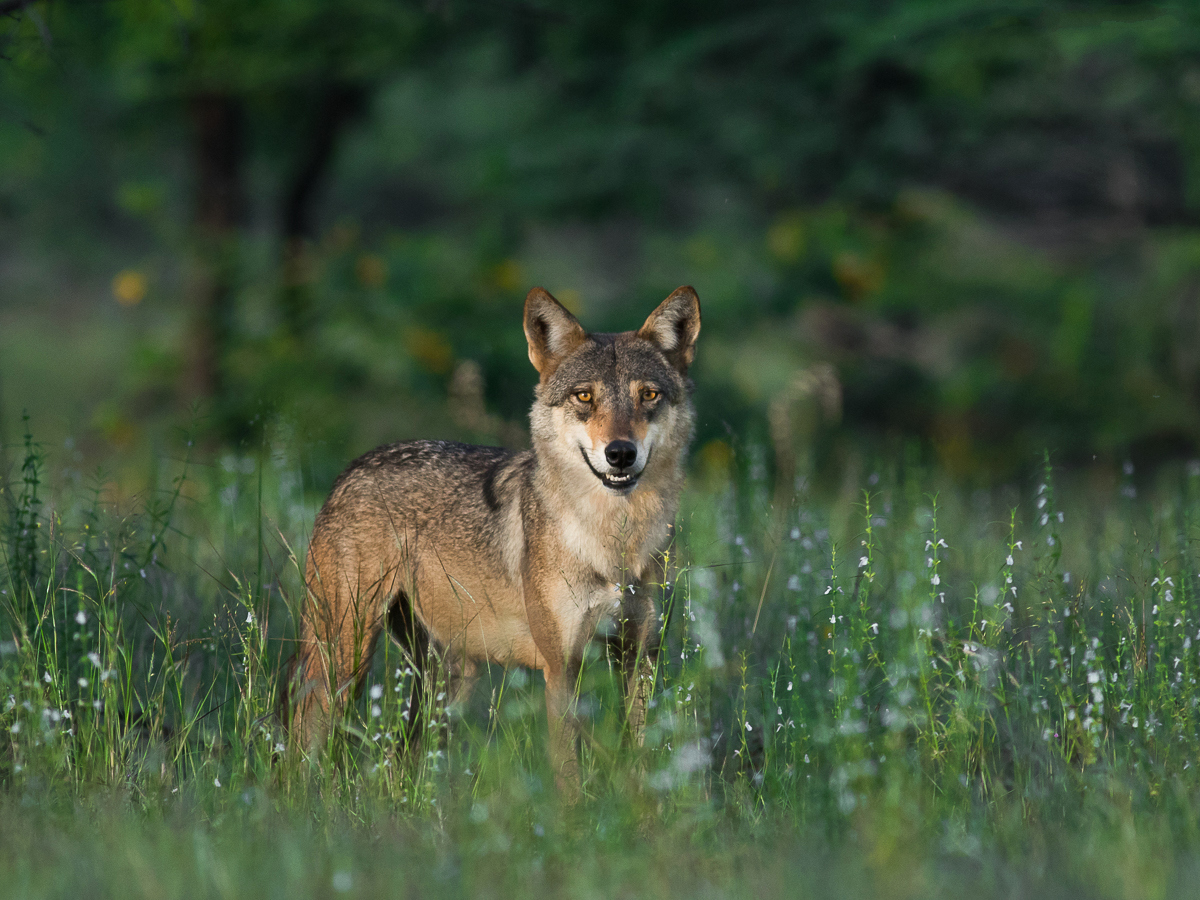
Indian Wolf

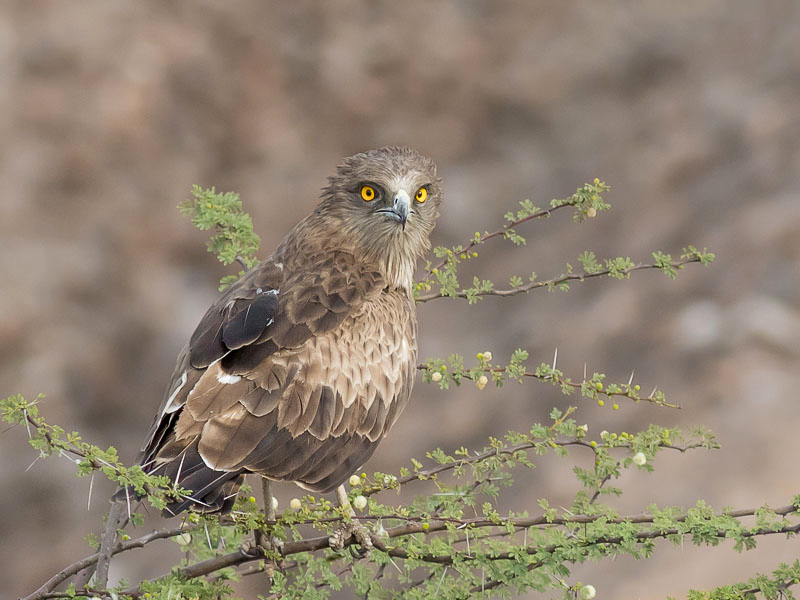
Short-toed Snake Eagle

== History ==
The area was declared as a sanctuary from 1919 as per the Wildlife Institute of India.

== Flora and fauna ==
Mayureshwar Sanctuary is mostly made of dry deciduous scrub forest of Acacia catechu (Khair), Acacia sp. (Hivar), Dalbergia latifolia (Sisoo), Ziziphus mauritiana (Ber), Carissa opaca (Karwand), Alysicarpus bupleurifolius, Cyathocline purpurea, Eriocauion diane, Merremia emarginata, Cucumis melo, Cyperus kyllingia, Striga densiflora, Mareilea minuta trees and interspersed grasslands. Furthermore, the flora of Bramati constitutes a total of 994 taxa belonging to 938 species with 42 varieties and 14 sub-species, 577 genera and 136 families of flowering plants recorded and described.

It is also home to a variety of birds including: Indian roller, black-winged kite, Eurasian collared dove, ashy-crowned sparrow lark, blue-cheeked bee-eater, Gray Francolin, Yellow-wattled Lapwing, Common Hawk-Cuckoo, Short-Toed Snake Eagle, Bonelli's Eagle, Rufous-fronted Prinia, Indian Bush-Lark, Bay-backed Shrike, Southern Gray Shrike.

Migratory species like European Roller and Montagu's harrier can be seen in Winter season

The main animal species found in the refuge are the Indian Gazelle (Chinkara), Striped Hyena, Indian gray wolf, Indian Jackal, Indian fox and Indian Hare (black-naped hare).

== Information ==
Mayureshwar Wildlife Sanctuary is not only popular for its birds and wildlife population, but also for its natural environment. One can see the Indian gazelle (chinkara), as well as birds, Striped Hyena, Indian Gray Wolf (Canis Lupus) and Indian Fox (Vulpes Bengalesis). Tourists are allowed to drive their vehicles inside the sanctuary as well as to walk.

The forest department has two tents within the sanctuary area. Accommodation options available in the vicinity are in Supe, outside the sanctuary. One may also stay in the Hadapsar area in Pune and drive to the sanctuary in the morning or evening.

The best time to visit is from late August to February when the weather is not very harsh. Summers are hot and humid and there is heavy rainfall during monsoon. The sanctuary is one of the smallest wildlife sanctuaries, with an area of 5.14 km^{2} and grasslands and desert areas.

== Travel ==
- Pune – 74 km
- Baramati – 41 km
- Mumbai – 220 km
- Satara – 88 km
- Ahmednagar – 111 km
- Beed – 198 km
- Solapur – 211 km
- Nashik – 265 km
- Kolhapur – 205 km

Air – The nearest airport is Pune International Airport (80 km; 1.5 hours away) however Mumbai Chhatrapati Shivaji Maharaj International Airport (250 km; 4.5 hours away) offers more flight options.

Rail -The Pune railway station (70 km;around 1.5 hours away) is well connected to Mumbai and other cities in Maharashtra.

Road – Mayureshwar is comfortable driving distance from Pune city (70 km; anywhere from 30 minutes to 2 hours).

Time to visit: Wildlife enthusiasts visit Mayureshwar all year round in all seasons.

Summer – April, May and June are the hottest months, with day temperatures soaring over 35°C.

Monsoons -Mayureshwar receives rain from July to September. This is the best time to photograph some of the resident wildlife species against the fresh green landscape.

Winter – October to January are the coolest months, with temperatures ranging from 18 to 30°C during the day. This season is the best for bird-watching enthusiasts, as there will be a variety of migratory bird species wintering at Mayureshwar.
