= Kataraki, Bagalkot =

Village in Karnataka, India

Kataraki Katarki
- Village
- Location within Karnataka Location within India
- Coordinates: 16°14′41″N 075°29′20″E
- Country: India
- State: Karnataka
- District: Bagalkot district
- Taluka: Bilagi

Languages
  - Official: Kannada
- Time zone: UTC+5:30 (IST)

Kataraki is a panchayat village in the southern state of Karnataka, India. Administratively, kataraki under Bilagi Taluka of Bagalkot District in Karnataka. The village of Kataraki was a mandal panchayat including 7 villages. The village is 5 km from to Kaladgi which was a district place in British reign and known for its fruit gardens, 24 km by road east of Mudhol and 29 km by road southwest of the town of Bilagi, and 35 km from Bagalkot. Katarki is on the north shore of the Ghataprabha River. There is famous temple called Ramalingeshwara on the banks of the Ghataprabha River and Patri Basaveshwara temple is there.

== Divisions ==
The Kataraki gram panchayat oversees three villages: Katarki, Lingapur (S.K.) and Shiraguppi.
