= Teggi =

- Village
- Location within Karnataka Location within India
- Coordinates: 16°22′37.43″N 75°31′40.07″E
- Country: India
- State: Karnataka
- District: Bagalkot district
- Taluk: Bilagi

Languages
  - Official: Kannada
- Time zone: UTC+5:30 (IST)
- PIN: 587 117
- Telephone code: 08425

Teggi is a panchayat village in the southern state of Karnataka, India. Administratively, Teggi is under Bilagi Taluka of Bagalkot District in Karnataka. The village of Teggi is 18.1 km by road east of Galagali and 12.5 km by road northwest of the town of Bilagi. Teggi is on the south shore of the Krishna River. Teggi has Higher Primary School (HPS) and Government High School (GHS) and medium of teaching is in Kannada. The people of this village worship Shri Somalingeshwar god and has temple of it built it in stone. Population is dominated by the Valmiki/Nayak/Bedar community (List of Scheduled Tribes in India). The Teggi village has Bank of Baroda and customers from nearby villages Bisanal, Shivapur, Hanchinal, and Ballur along with local people use this.

== Divisions ==
The Teggi gram panchayat oversees three villages: Teggi, Bisanal, and Shivapur.
