= Arakeri, Bagalkot =

Arakeri
- Village
- Location within Karnataka Location within India
- Coordinates: 16°16′46″N 075°30′19″E
- Country: India
- State: Karnataka
- District: Bagalkot district
- Taluka: Bilagi

Population (2009)
  - Total: 4,611

Languages
  - Official: Kannada
- Time zone: UTC+5:30 (IST)

Arakeri is a panchayat village in the southern state of Karnataka, India. Administratively, Arakeri is under Bilagi Taluka of Bagalkot District in Karnataka. Arakeri is 4.5 km by road north of Katarki and 25 km by road west southwest of the town of Bilagi.

== Demographics ==
As of 2009 census, the village of Arakeri had an estimated population of 4,611.
