= Bilagi =

Bilagi Bilgi
- Town
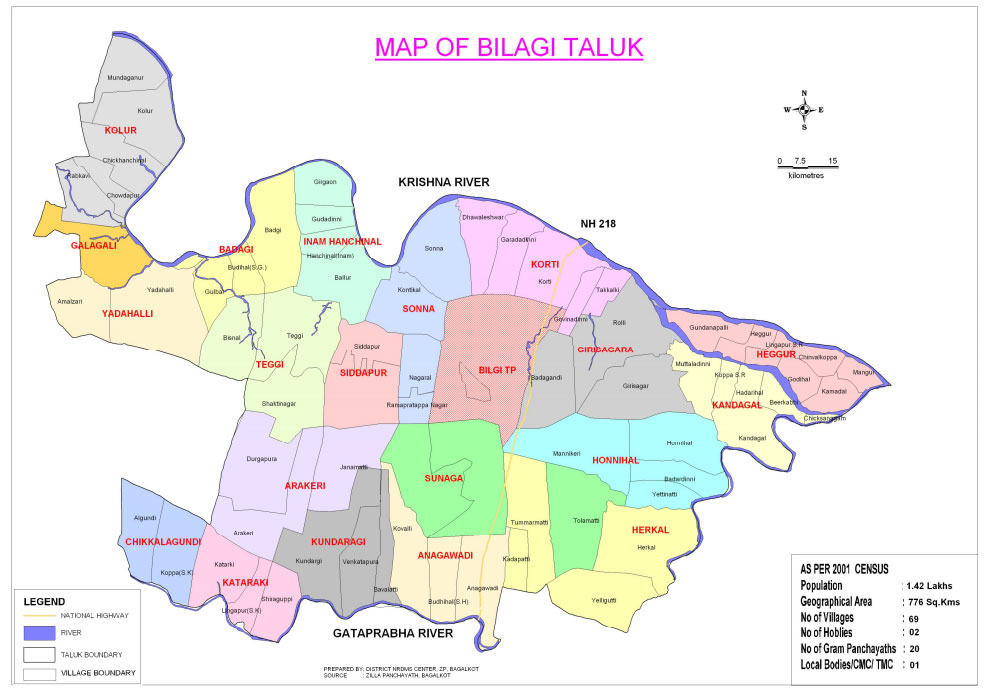
- Bilagi Taluk

- Location in Karnataka, India
- Coordinates: 16°20′50″N 075°37′05″E
- Country: India
- State: Karnataka
- District: Bagalkot

Area
  - Total: 4.50 km^{2} (1.74 sq mi)
- Elevation: 564 m (1,850 ft)

Population (2001)
  - Total: 15,454
  - Density: 3,434.22/km^{2} (8,894.6/sq mi)

Languages
  - Official: Kannada
- Time zone: UTC+5:30 (IST)
- PIN: 587 116
- Telephone code: 08425
- ISO 3166 code: IN-KA
- Vehicle registration: KA 29
- Website: karnataka.gov.in

Bilagi, or Bilgi, is a panchayat town and taluka in the Bagalkot district of Karnataka, India. It is located at a distance of 30 km from the district headquarters of Bagalkote. The main occupation of people in this taluka is agriculture. Most of the farmers grow sugarcane.

== History ==
To the north of Bilgi is a stone pond called Arettina Bavi ('six-bullock well'), an object of interest. The temple inside the well of Mahadeva, is not worshipped as the linga is broken. The stone inscriptions in Kannada and Persian built into the walls of the well register that it was constructed by Visajipanta in 1708. There is a dargah of Hasan Dongri, in the town. Moharam festival is celebrated in a big way here. One Km to the south of Bilgi is the temple of Shri Siddeshwara, encompassed by hillocks. On a footstep of the temple is an inscription of 1695–96 which records construction of the eastern doorway by Khanderao Timmaji, a subordinate of Vajir Haidar Khan. The famous historic Siddeshwar temple is worshiped by town people It is place of cultural and festival like moharam and Karad hunnime etc

== Geography ==
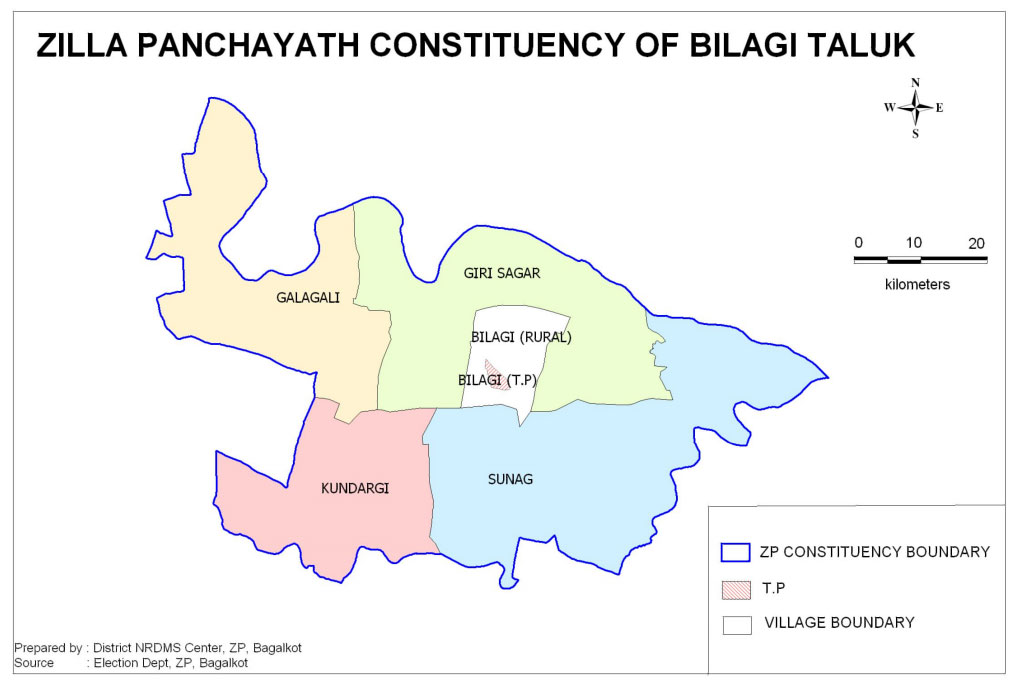
Bilagi ZP Constituency Map

The town of Bilgi is located at 16°20′50″N 075°37′05″E. It has an average elevation of 509 metres (1669 feet).

The taluka covers 782 square kilometres (301.9 sq mi) and lies between 16°-03′ to 16°-32′ north latitude and 75°-73′ to 76°-49′ east longitude. The taluka is bordered by Bijapur Taluka of Bijapur District to the north, Mudhol Taluka to the west, Bagalkot Taluka to the south and southeast, and Jamakhandi Taluka to the north. The Krishna River and reservoir form its northern boundary. The National Highway 52 (India) passes near this place.

== Demographics ==
As of the 2001 Indian census, the town of Bilagi had a population of 15,464. Males constituted 50% of the population and females 50%. Bilagi had an average literacy rate of 58%, lower than the national average of 59.5%; with male literacy of 66% and female literacy of 49%. 16% of the population was under 6 years of age.

== Divisions of taluka ==
In addition to the headquarters town of Bilgi, Bilagi Taluka has twenty panchayat villages which administer from one to seven sub-villages; they are:

- Anagwadi
- Arakeri
- Badagi (Badgi)
- Chikkalagundi
- Galgalli
- Girisagar
- Heggur
- Herkal
- Honnihal
- Inam-Hanchinal
- Kandagal
- Kataraki (Katarki)
- Kollur
- Korthi
- Kundargi
- Siddapur
- Sonna
- Sunag
- Teggi
- Nagaral
- Yadahalli

== Culture ==
Just north of the town is Arettina Bavi ('six-bullock well'), a stone enclosed pond or well. Inside the well there is a temple to Mahadeva Shiva; however, the lingam is broken. On the walls of the well are inscriptions in Kannada and Persian that record its construction in 1708. The Kannada inscription says Visaji Mahadeva Pandita of Gargya-gotra.

== Noted people ==
- Amirbai Karnataki - Famous actress and singer, was born in Bilagi

== See also ==
- Bilgi Assembly constituency
