= Tilyar Lake =

Lake in Haryana, India

- Location in Haryana, India Tilyar Lake (India)
- Location: Rohtak district, Haryana, India
- Coordinates: 28°52′44″N 76°38′09″E
- Primary inflows: Canal water
- Primary outflows: No
- Basin countries: India
- Surface area: 132 acres (0.53 km^{2})
- Average depth: 10 ft (3.0 m)
- Max. depth: 12 ft (3.7 m)
- Website: www.haryanaforest.gov.in

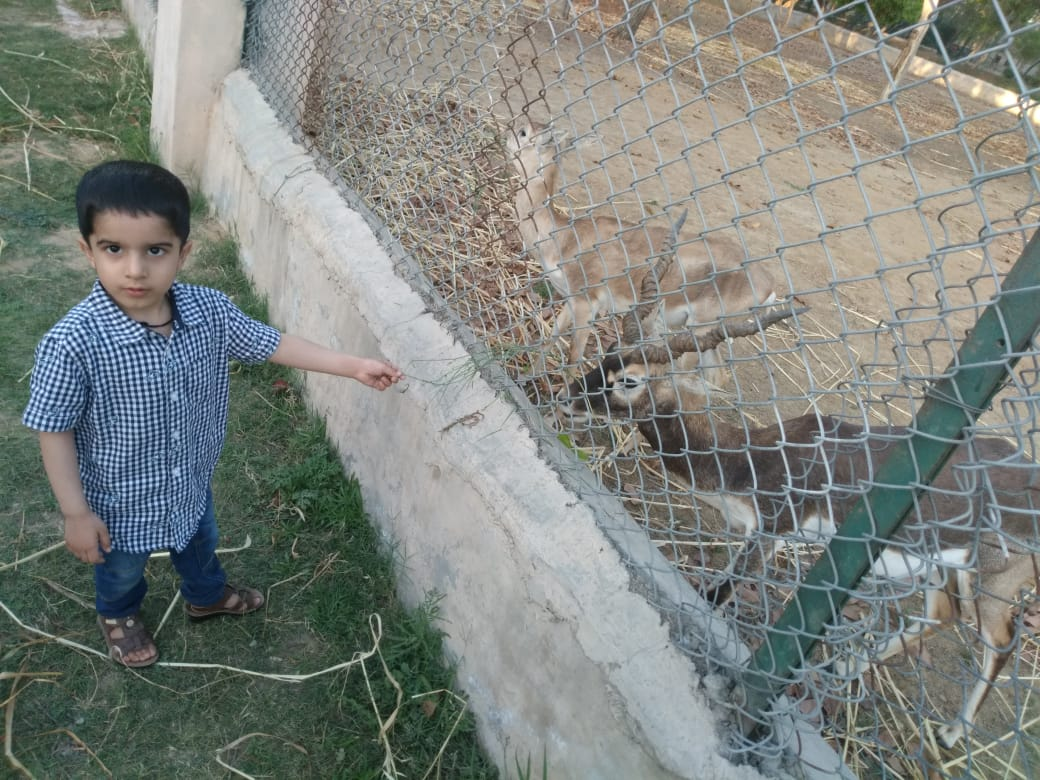
Antelope enclosure in Mini Zoo.

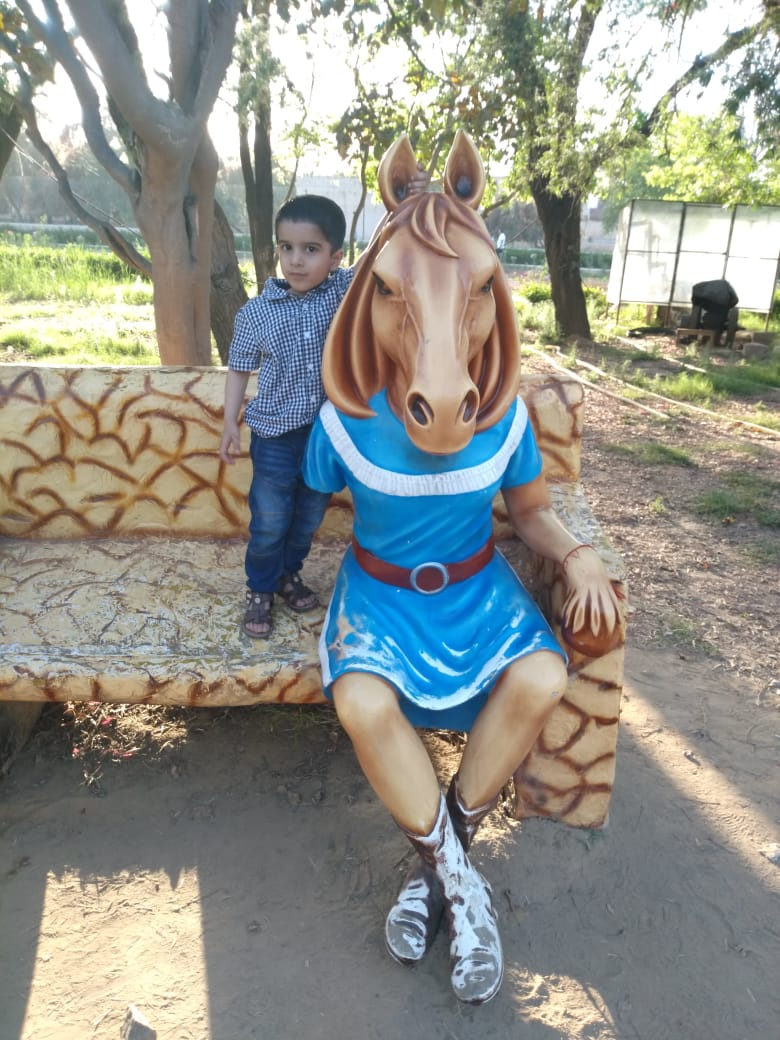
Horse mascot at Tilyar lake complex Inside Mini Zoo.

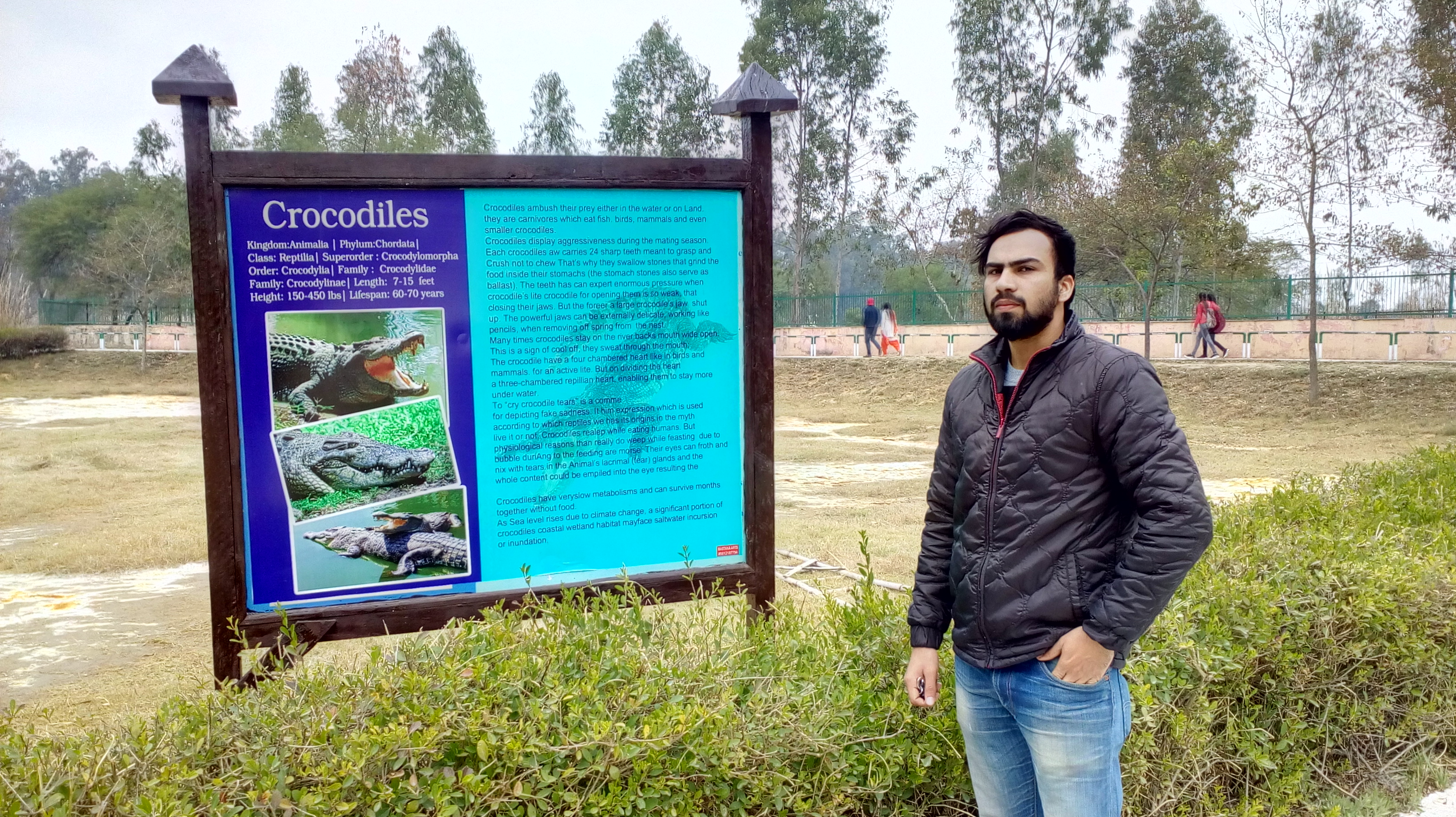
Crocodile enclosure signboard along with detailed classification inside Mini zoo.

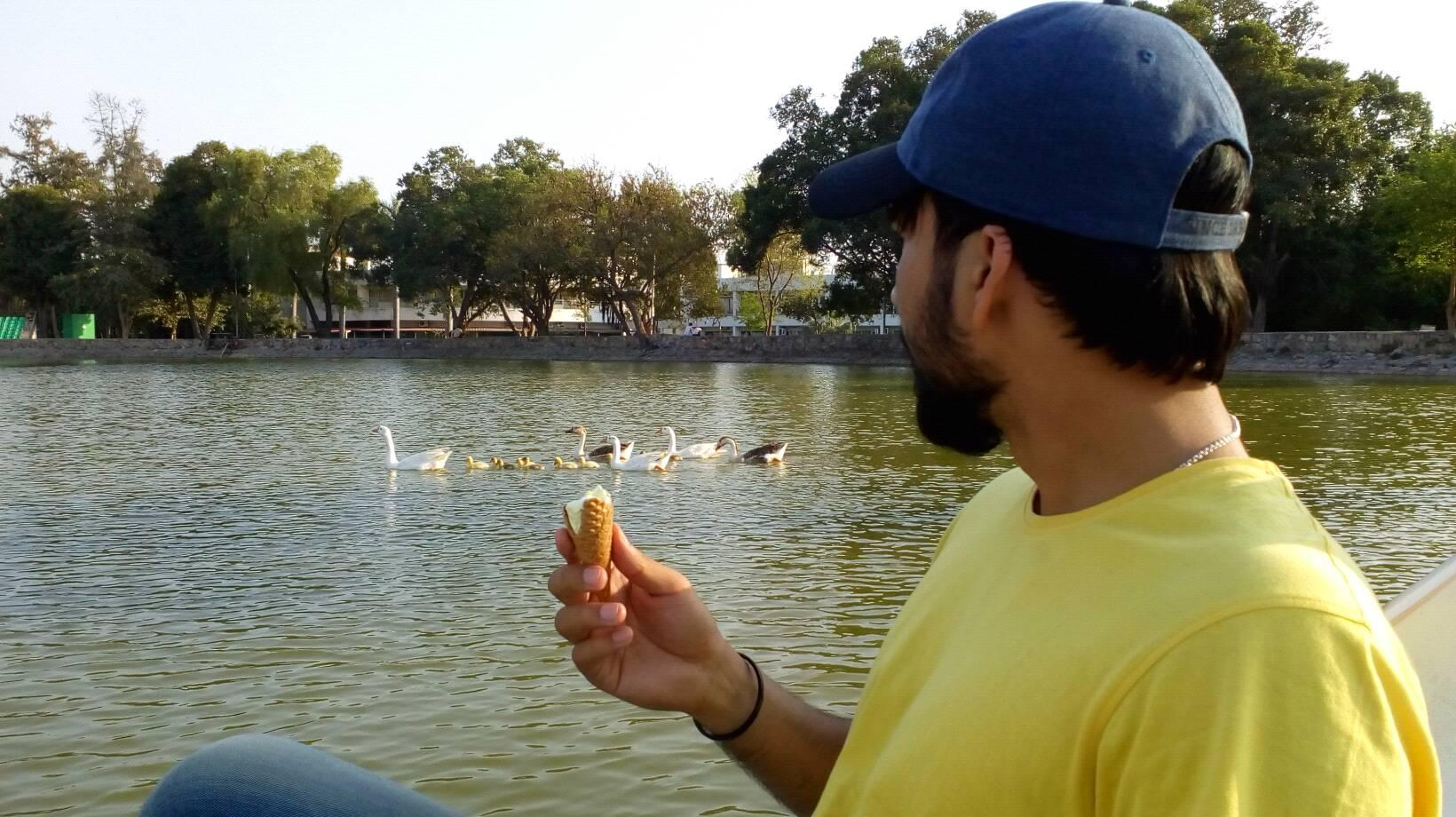
View of Tilyar lake from Boat.(Boating facility is available for tourists and visitors.)

Tilyar Lake is one of the major tourist attractions in the Indian state of Haryana. It is 70 km (43 mi) from New Delhi on the Delhi – Fazilka highway and is located close to the city of Rohtak in Haryana.

The Tilyar Lake is only 42 km (26 mi) from Delhi border and Tilyar Zoo at Rohtak is well maintained and worth visiting specially for families. Fishing is permissible at Tilyar Lake after paying INR200 fishing fee.

The lake lies in a 132-acre (0.53 km^{2}) area and forms an integral part of the tourist setup, making it one of the greenest stretches in the adjoining area. Entry to Tilyar lake is free. The lake complex also houses Rohtak Zoo.

== Mini zoo ==
Haryana had many mini zoos spread across the state. In 2001 the Government of Haryana decided to shut these down and replace them with well developed viable zoos, this included setting up the zoo at Rohtak within Tilyar Lake complex. As a result, enclosures for housing animals and aviaries for birds were built. Visitor facilities such as landscaping, walkways & trials, gardens, hillocks, lakes, artificial waterfalls, cafe, visitor toilets & resting shelters, watch towers, drinking water facilities etc. were created. Entry is only INR 10 for adults and INR 5 for kids.
