= Yadahalli, Bilagi =

Yadahalli
- Village
- Location within Karnataka Location within India
- Coordinates: 16°23′47″N 075°27′14″E
- Country: India
- State: Karnataka
- District: Bagalkot district
- Taluka: Bilagi

Languages
  - Official: Kannada
- Time zone: UTC+5:30 (IST)
- PIN: 587117
- Vehicle registration: 29

Yadahalli is a panchayat village in the southern state of Karnataka, India. Administratively, Yadahalli is under Bilagi Taluka of Bagalkot District in Karnataka. It have Karnataka's first chinkara wildlife sanctuary named Yadahalli Chinkara Wildlife Sanctuary. The village of Yadahalli is 9 km by road east of Mantur and 22 km by road northwest of the town of Bilagi. Yadahalli is on the south shore of the Krishna River.

== Divisions ==
The Yadahalli gram panchayat oversees two villages: Yadahalli, and Amalazari.
