= Kandagal =

Village in Karnataka, India

- Village
- Location in Karnataka, India Kandagal (India)
- Coordinates: 14°15′52″N 75°58′1″E
- Country: India
- State: Karnataka
- District: Davanagere
- Taluk: Davanagere
- Elevation: 593 m (1,946 ft)

Population (2011)
  - Total: 4,512

Languages
  - Local: Kannada
- Time zone: UTC+5:30 (IST)
- PIN: 577514
- STD code: 08192

Kandagal, also known as Kandagallu, is a village in Davangere taluk, Karnataka, South India. To the west of the village is a small lake with the historic Sri Kalleshwara Temple at the center. It is 30 kilometers from Davangere city, and there is bus service between the two towns. The population is 4,512 as of the year 2011.

== Geography ==
Kandagal is located in the central part of Davangere district, covering an area of 1420 hectares. Its average elevation is 593 meters above the sea level.

== Demographics ==
According to 2011 census of India, Kandagal has a total population of 4,512. The total literacy rate was 67.18%, with 1,663 of the male residents and 1,368 of the female residents being literate.
