= Ramdurg taluk =

Tehsil in Belagavi district

Ramdurg is a taluka in Belagavi district, Karnataka state, India. As of the 2011 Census of India, it had a population of 223,727 across 115 villages. The population comprised 113,560 males and 110,167 females.

== Villages ==
As of 2011, the following villages were assigned to Ramdurg taluka.

- Aneguddi
- Aribenchi
- Awaradi
- Bannur
- Batakurki
- Beedaki
- Bennur
- Bhagojikoppa
- Bijaguppi
- Bochabal
- Boodanur
- Budnikhurd
- Channatti
- Chennapur
- Chetan Nagar
- Chikkamulangi
- Chikkoppa K.S.
- Chikkoppa S.K.
- Chiktadashi
- Chilamur
- Chinchakhandi
- Chippalkatti
- Chunchanur
- Dadibhavi Salapur
- Dodamangadi
- Durganagar
- Ghatakanur
- Godachi
- Gokulnagar
- Gonaganur
- Gonnagar
- Gudagoppa
- Gudagumnal
- Gudakatti
- Guttigoli
- Halagatti
- Haletoragal
- Halolli
- Hampiholi
- Hanama Sagar
- Hanamapur S.U.
- Hirekoppa K.S.
- Hiremulangi
- Hiretadashi
- Hosakeri
- Hosakoti
- Huligoppa
- Hulkund
- Idagal
- Jalikatti
- K.Chandargi
- K.Junipeth
- Kadampur
- Kadlikoppa
- Kalamad
- Kalhal
- Kallur
- Kamakeri
- Kamanakoppa
- Kankanwadi
- Karadigudda
- Katakol
- Kesaragoppa
- Khanapeth
- Kilabanur
- Kittur
- Kolachi
- Krishnanagar
- Kullur
- Kunnal
- Lakhanayakanakoppa
- Lingadal
- M.Chandargi
- M.Kallapur
- M.Khanapur
- M.Timmapur
- Maganur
- Mallapur
- Manihal
- Maradagi
- Mudakavi
- Mudenkoppa
- Mudenur
- Mullur
- Murakatnal
- Naganur
- Nandihal
- Narasapur
- Obalapur
- Padamandi
- Panchagaon
- Ramapur
- Rankalkoppa
- Revadikoppa
- Rokkadakatti
- Sangal
- Sarakote Devapur
- Shirasapur
- Shivanakote
- Shivapeth
- Sidnal
- Somapur
- Soppadla
- Sunnal
- Sureban
- Timmapur S.A.
- Tondikatti
- Toranagatti
- Totagatti
- Turanur
- Udapudi
- Ujjinakoppa
- Umatar
- Venkateshwarnagar
- Venktapur
