= Chetan =

Chetan may refer to:

- Chetan (name), an Indian and Nepalese given name
- Chetan, Iran, a village in Mazandaran Province, Iran
- Chetan, Kurdistan, a village in Kurdistan Province, Iran
- Lucian Chetan (born 1985), Romanian soccer player

== See also ==
- Chetana (disambiguation)
- Chaitanya (disambiguation)
- Chit (disambiguation)
- Cheta (disambiguation)
