= Thimmapur =

Thimmapur may refer to several places in India:

== Andhra Pradesh ==
- Thimmapuram, Kakinada, a neighbourhood in Kakinada

== Karnataka ==
- Timmapur, Gadag, a panchayat village in Gadag district
- Timmapur, Sindhanur, a panchayat village in Sindhanur taluk, Raichur district

== Tamil Nadu ==
- Thimmapuram, a village in Virudhunagar district
- Thimmapur-M-Tadakod, a village in Dharwad district

== Telangana ==
- Thimmapur (Haveli), Warangal, a neighbourhood of Warangal
- Thimmapur, Karimnagar district, a village in the Virudhunagar district
- Thimmapur, Gudur mandal, a village in Gudur mandal, Warangal district
- Thimmapur, Kothagudem mandal, a village in Kothagudem mandal, Warangal district
- Thimmapur, Nalgonda district, a village in the Nalgonda district
- Thimmapur, Sangam mandal, a village in Sangam mandal, Warangal district
- Thimmapur, Venkatapuram mandal, a village in Venkatapuram mandal, Warangal district
- Thimmapur, Warangal district, a village in Zaffergadh mandal, Warangal district

== See also ==
- Timmapur (disambiguation)
