= Chaitanya =

Chaitanya, Chaithanya, or Chetna may refer to

== Philosophy ==
- Cetanā, Buddhist concept
- Chaitanya (consciousness), Hindu philosophical concept

== People ==
- Chetna (given name)
- Chaitanya (name)
- Chaitanya Mahaprabhu (1486–1533), founder of Gaudiya Vaishnavism

== Media ==
- Chaitanya (film), a 1991 Telugu film
- Shri Chaitanya Mahaprabhu (film), a 1953 Hindi biopic film
- Chaitanya Mangala, a 16th-century hagiographical work
- Chaitanya Charitamrita, a biography of Chaitanya Mahaprabhu
- Chaitanya Bhagavata, a hagiography of Chaitanya Mahaprabhu

== Education ==
- Chaitanya Bharathi Institute of Technology in India
- Sree Chaitanya College in India
- Sri Chaitanya Techno School, Eluru in India

== See also ==
- Chetana (disambiguation)
- Chetan (disambiguation)
- Chit (disambiguation)
