= Chetana =

Chetana may refer to:

- Cetanā, mental directionality in Buddhism
- Chetana (Surat), Gujarati language monthly
- Chetana Jagrati Punj, welfare society
- Chetana (theatre group), a renounced Indian theatre group based on Kolkata, West Bengal

== People ==
- Chetana Das, Indian actress
- Chetana Nagavajara (born 1937), Thai academic

== See also ==
- Chetan (disambiguation)
- Chaitanya (disambiguation)
- Chit (disambiguation)
