= Chitin (disambiguation) =

Chitin is a chemical compound found in fungi and animals.

Chitin may also refer to:

- Chitin, Iran, a village
- Chitin: I, a board game

== See also ==
- Chetin (disambiguation)
- Chiton (disambiguation)
- Chitting, an agricultural technique
- Chitlins, a culinary dish
