= Timmapur =

Timmapur may refer to any of several villages in Karnataka, India:

- Timmapur, Belgaum district
- Timmapur, Gadag district
- Timmapur, Raichur district
- Timmapur (S.A.), Belgaum district
- M.Timmapur, Belgaum district

== See also ==
- Thimmapur (disambiguation)
