= Chitan =

Chitan (Persian: چيتان or چيتن) may refer to:

- Chitan, Kurdistan Persian: چيتان, romanized: Chitān
- Chitan, Mazandaran Persian: چيتن, romanized: Chitan
