= Kittur, Ramdurg taluka =

Kittur is a village in Ramdurg taluka, in Belagavi district in the Indian state of Karnataka. At the 2011 Census of India, it had a population of 2,356 across 416 households.
