= Godachi Shree Bhadrakali Veerabhadreshwara Temple =

Hindu temple in India

- ಗೊಡಚಿ ಶ್ರೀ ಭದ್ರಕಾಳಿ ವೀರಭದ್ರೇಶ್ವರ ದೇವಸ್ಥಾನ
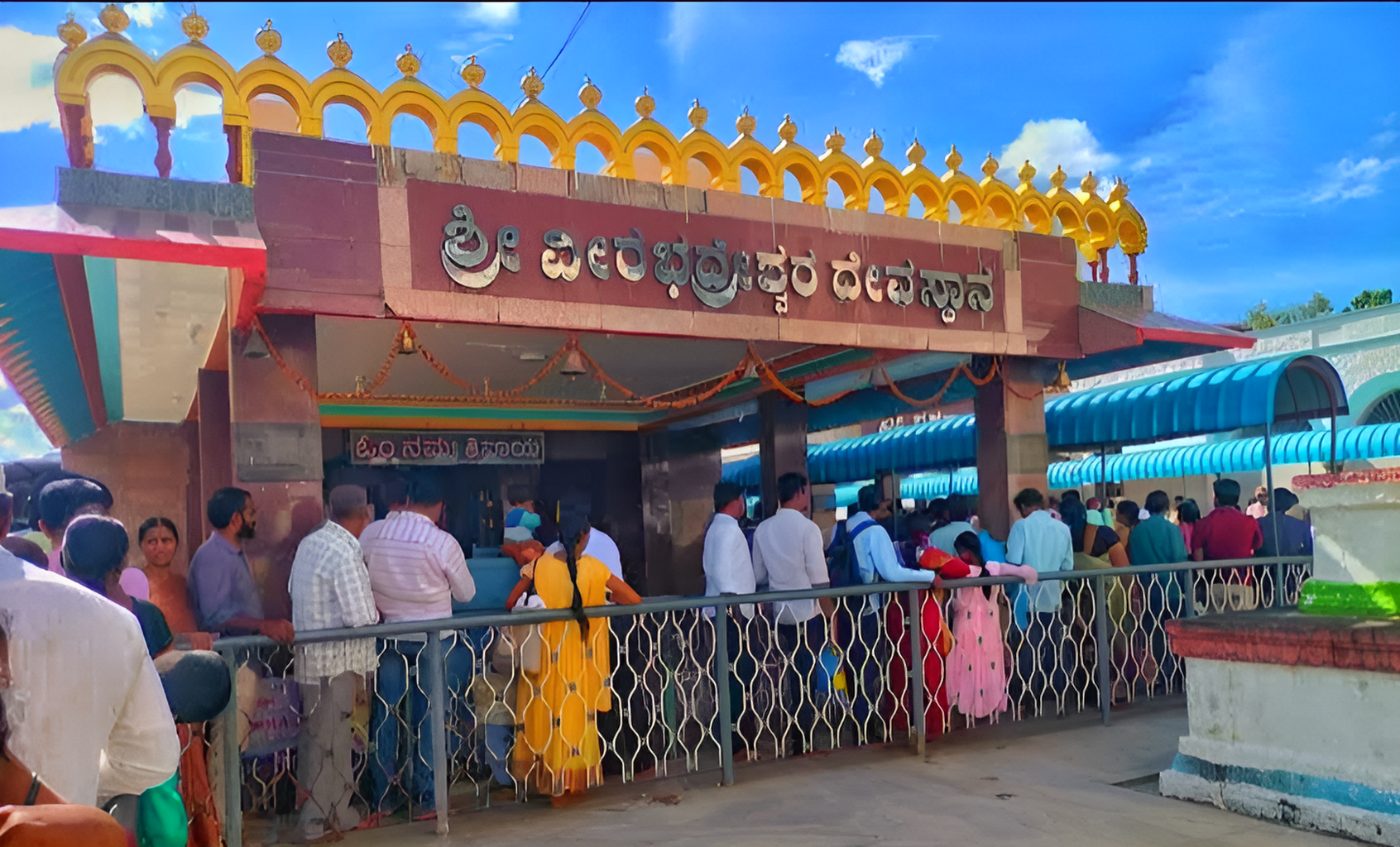
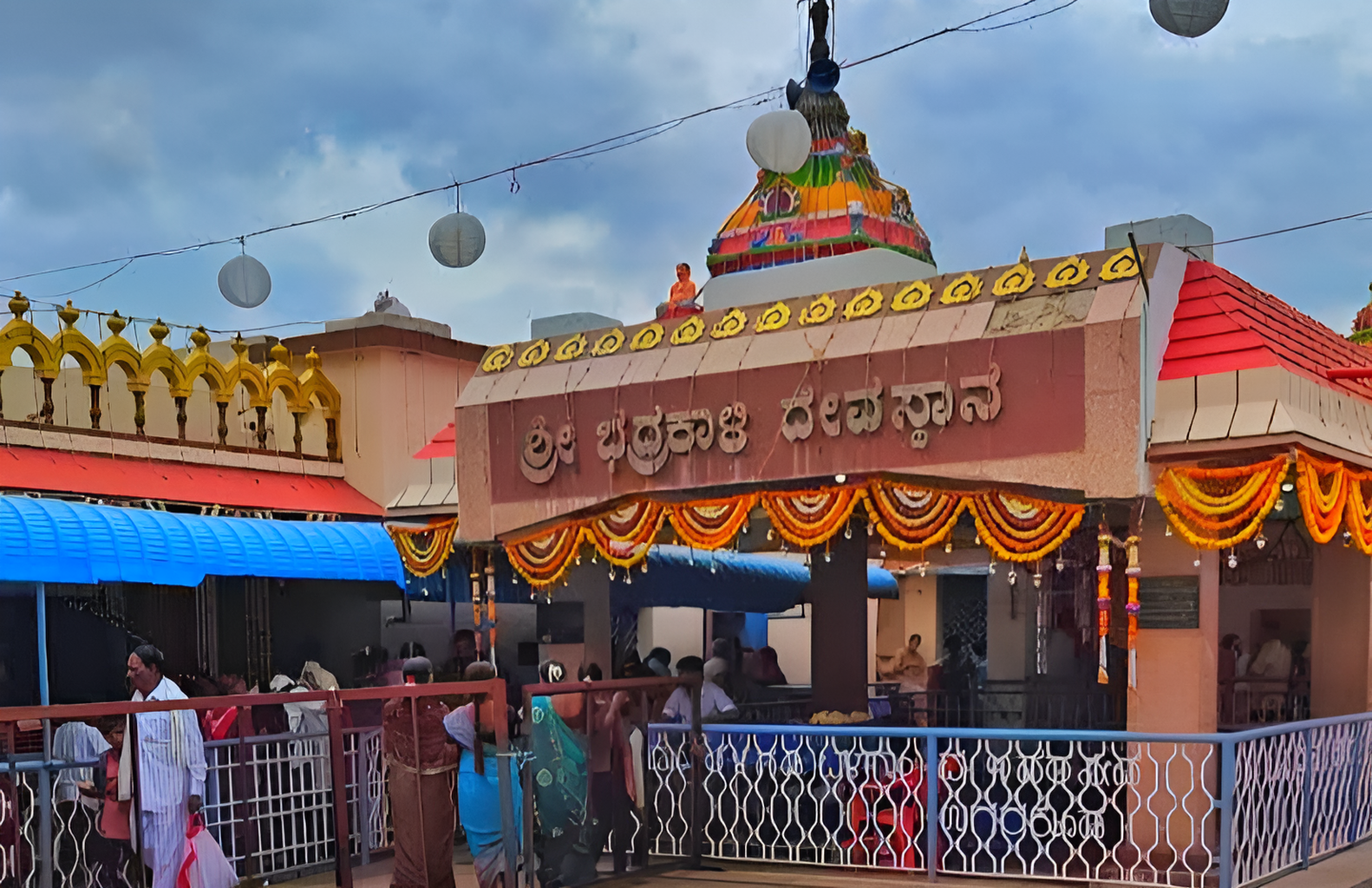
- Veerabhadreshwara Bhadrakali

- Location in Karnataka

Religion
- Affiliation: Hinduism
- Deity: Virabhadra; Bhadrakali

Location
- Location: Godachi
- State: Karnataka
- Country: India
- Coordinates: 16.013560°N 75.194051°E

Architecture
- Style: Vijayanagara architecture; Chalukya architecture

Shree Bhadrakali Veerabhadreshwara
- Divine couple Warrior avatars of Adishakti and Shiva: Deities of; Power; Protection; Auspiciousness
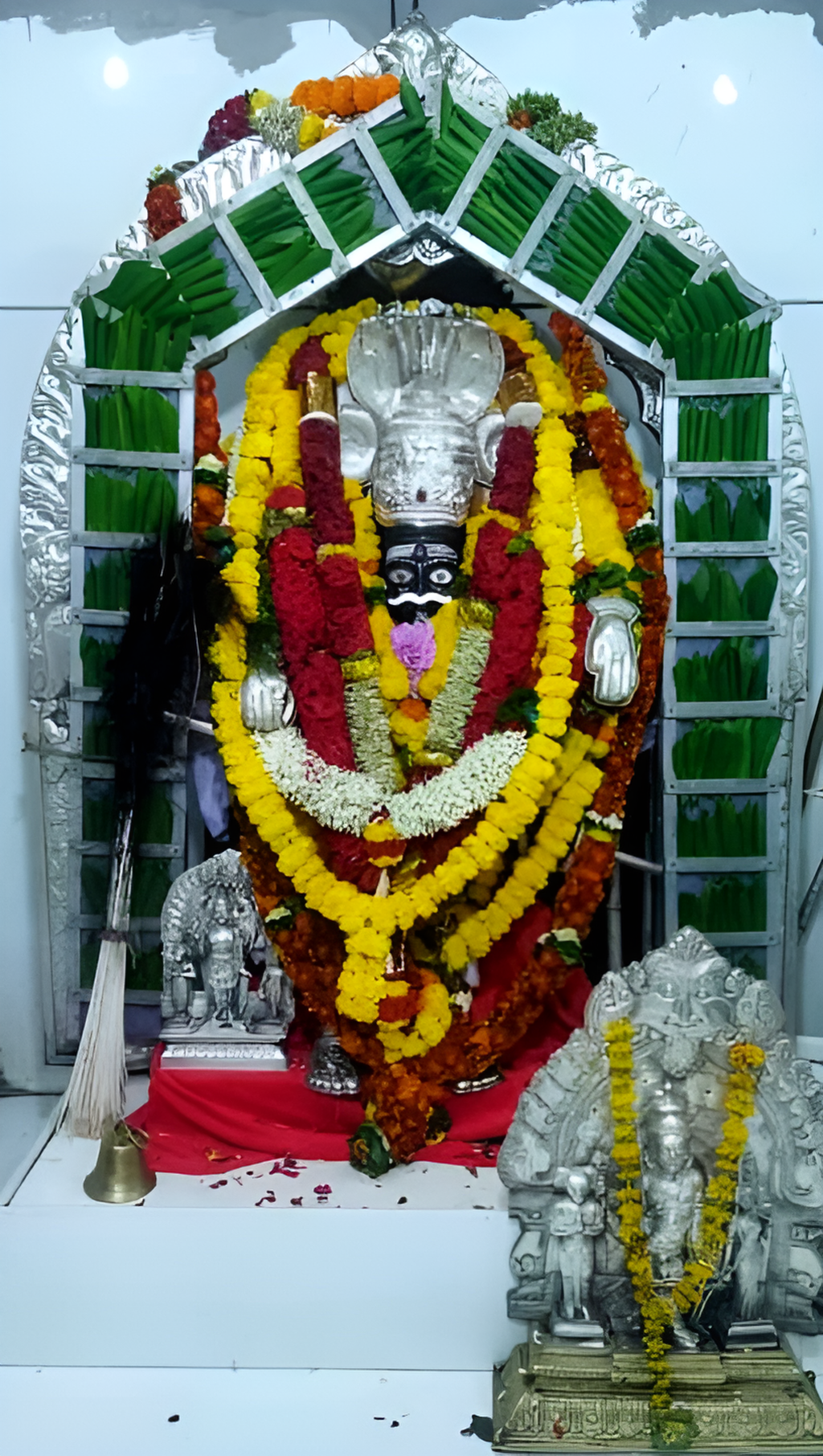
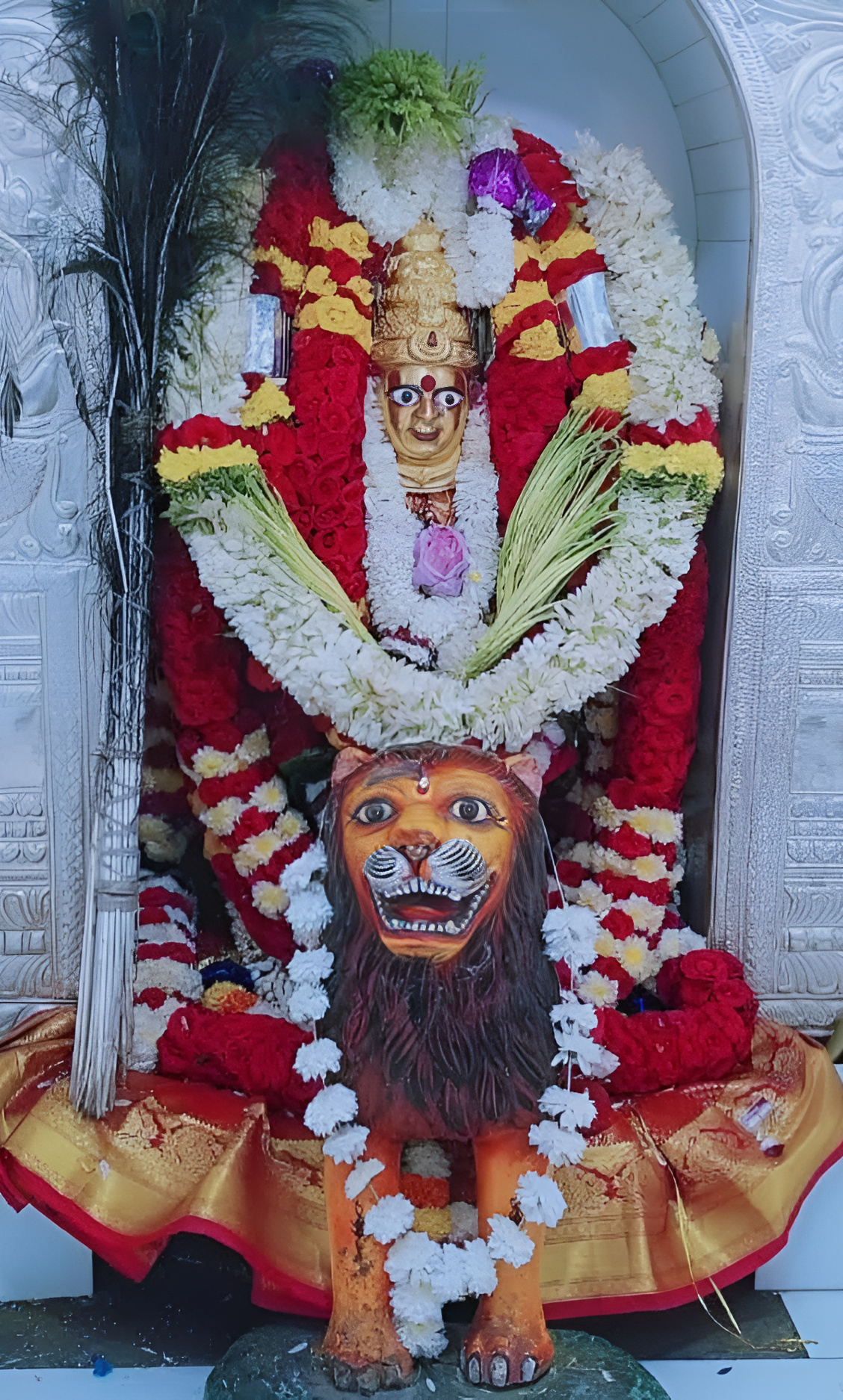
- Veerabhadreshwara Bhadrakali
- Affiliation: Adishakti; Shiva
- Planet: Mangala
- Mantra: oṃ bhadrakāl̤yai namaḥ; oṃ vīrabhadrāya namaḥ
- Battles: Daksha Yajna
- Day: Tuesday
- Mount: Horse; Lion
- Texts: Shiva Purana
- Festivals: Bhadrakali Jayanthi; Maha Shivaratri; Shravana; Veerabhadreshwara Jayanthi; Jathre

Godachi Jathre ಗೊಡಚಿ ಜಾತ್ರೆ
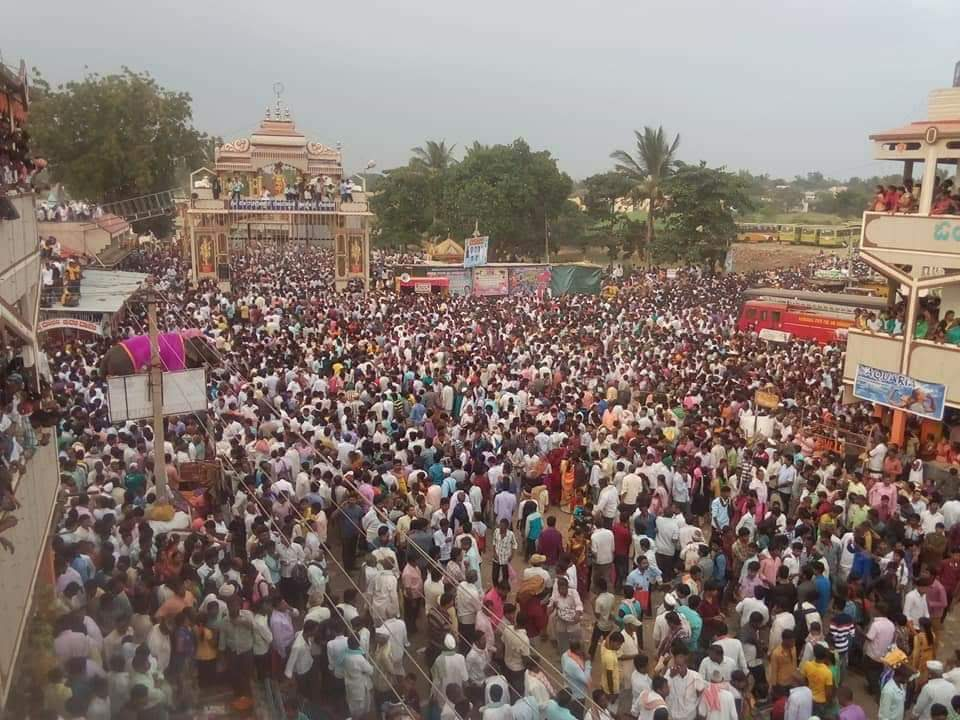
- Godachi Shree Veerabhadreshwara Jathre
- Status: Active
- Genre: Fair
- Frequency: Annually
- Most recent: 8 December 2022
- Next event: 26 December 2023 Full moon day of Margashira Month in Hindu calendar
- Major events: Veeragase; Rathotsava; Laksha Deepotsava
- 2023

Godachi Shree Bhadrakali Veerabhadreshwara Temple is a Hindu temple dedicated to divine couple Virabhadra and Bhadrakali, located in Godachi village of Belagavi district in Karnataka. The temple's garbhagriha is in Vijayanagara style and the door way is in Chalukya style of architecture.
