= Bannur, Belagavi =

Bannur
- Village
- Country: India
- State: Karnataka
- District: Belagavi

Population (2011)
  - Total: 1,540

Languages
  - Official: Kannada
- Time zone: UTC+5:30 (IST)

Bannur is a village in Ramdurg taluka of Belagavi district in the southern state of Karnataka, India. According to the 2011 Census of India, Bannur had a population of 1,540, with 802 males and 738 females.
