= Chetan (name) =

- Gender: Male

Origin
- Origin: Sanskrit
- Region of origin: India

Other names
- Related names: Chaitan, Chaitanya

Chetan is a common Indian and Nepalese first name for males. The Hindi word means 'Spirit Full' or 'Full of Consciousness'; the name is derived from the Sanskrit word 'Chaitanya'.

Chetan may refer to:

- Chetan Anand (badminton), badminton player from India
- Chetan Anand (director) (1921–1997), Hindi film producer, screenwriter and director
- Chetan Baboolall, Mauritian politician
- Chetan Baboor (born 1974), Indian international table tennis champion
- Chetan Bhagat (born 1974), Indian author, columnist, and speaker
- Chetan Chauhan (1947–2020), former Indian cricketer and Member of Parliament
- Chetan (actor), Tamil television and film actor
- Lucian Chetan (born 1985), Romanian football player
- Chetan Eknath Chitnis (born 1961), Principal Investigator into malaria at ICGEB, New Delhi
- Chetan Hansraj, former model and Indian Film and television actor popular for portraying villain roles in TV serials
- Chetan Joshi, flautist in the Hindustani Classical Music tradition
- Chetan Kumar (born 1984), Kannada film actor
- Chetan Patel (born 1972), former English cricketer
- Kris Chetan Ramlu, New Zealand musician,
- Chetan Sakariya, Indian Cricketer
- Chetan Sharma (born 1966), medium pace bowler who was a member of the Indian cricket team
- Chetan Sosca, Indian playback singer
- Chetan Suryawanshi (born 1985), Indian born cricketer

== See also ==
- Aniyan Bava Chetan Bava, 1995 Malayalam comedy musical film
- Chhota Chetan, 1998 Hindi movie directed by Jijo Punnoose
- Chetan Nagar, village in Belgaum district in the southern state of Karnataka, India
- Chetouane
