= Chetin =

Chetin may refer to

- Chetin Kazak (born 1972), Bulgarian politician
- Chetin Sadula (born 1987), Bulgarian football player
- Gennady Chetin (1943–2002), Russian weightlifter
- Chetan, Iran, a village in Iran

== See also ==
- Chitin (disambiguation)
