= Kadampur, Belgaum =

Kadampur
- Village
- Country: India
- State: Karnataka
- District: Belgaum
- Talukas: Ramdurg

Languages
  - Official: Kannada
- Time zone: UTC+5:30 (IST)

Kadampur is a village in Belgaum district in Karnataka, India.
