= Katakol =

Katkol
- Hobali
- Nickname: Big village in Ramdurg Taluk
- Location in Karnataka, India Katkol (India)
- Coordinates: 15.95°N 75.30°E
- Country: India
- State: Karnataka
- District: Belgaum
- Talukas: Ramdurg

Population (2015)
  - Total: 22,143

Languages
  - Official: Kannada
- Time zone: UTC+5:30 (IST)
- Postal code: 591114

Katkol is a village in the southern state of Karnataka, India. It is located in the Ramdurg taluk of Belgaum district in Karnataka.

== Demographics ==
At the 2015 India census, Katkol had a population of 22143.

== See also ==
- Belgaum
- Districts of Karnataka
