= Kunnal =

Kunnal Kunnal N
- India: India
- State: Karnataka
- District: Belgaum
- Talukas: Ramdurg

Languages
  - Official: Kannada
- Time zone: UTC+5:30 (IST)

Kunnal is a village in Belgaum district in Karnataka, India.
