= Rankalkoppa =

- Village
- Country: India
- State: Karnataka
- District: Belgaum
- Talukas: Ramdurg

Languages
  - Official: Kannada
- Time zone: UTC+5:30 (IST)

Rankalkoppa is a village in Belgaum district of Karnataka, India.

== ಮೌಖಿಕ ಆಧಾರ ್ಗಲ್ ==
ರಂಕಲಕೊಪ್ಪ ಎಂಬ ಹಳ್ಳಿಯೂ ಮೊದಲು ಇಲ್ಲಿ ಕುಸ್ತಿ ಆಟ ಆಡಲು ಬಲು ಮುಂದೆ ಎಂದು ಹಿರಿಯರು ವ್ಯಕ್ತ ಪಡಿಸಿದರು. ಅಲ್ಲಿನ ಹಿರಿಯ ವ್ಯಕ್ತಿ ಆದ ಫಕೀರಪ್ಪ ಹುಚ್ಚೆನ್ನವರ್ ಎಂಬುವರು ಹೇಳುವ ಹಾಗೇ ಅಲ್ಲಿನ ಪ್ರಸಿದ್ದ ವಾದ ಕುಸ್ತಿ ಆಡುವ ವ್ಯಕ್ತಿ ಎಂದರೇ ಅದು ಹನಮಂತಪ್ಪ ಸಣ್ಣ ಈರಪ್ಪ ಗುದಗಿ ಇವರು ಸುತ್ತ ಮುತ್ತಲಿನ ಹಳ್ಳಿಗಳಲ್ಲಿ ಕುಸ್ತಿ ಪಂದ್ಯಾವಳಿ ಗೆದ್ದು ಊರಿನ ಹೆಮ್ಮೆ ಏನಿಸಿಕೊಂದಿದರು ಎಂದು ವಿವರ್ಸುತ್ತಾರೆ. ಹಾಗೆ ಅವರು ನೋಡಿದ ಒಂದು ಸನ್ನಿವೇಶ ವನ್ನಾ ಕಣ್ಣ ಮುಂದೆಯೇ ನಡೆದು ಹೋಯಿತು ಎಂದ ಹಾಗೆ ಹೇಳಿದರು, ಅದೇನೆಂದರೆ ಮುನ್ನವಳಿ ಎಂಬ ಹಳ್ಳಿಯಲಿ ಕುಸ್ತಿ ಆಡ್ತಾ ಪಟಂಗ್ರಿ ಸಾರಿದ ವ್ಯಕ್ತಿ ಎಂದರೇ ಹನಮಂತಪ್ಪ ಸಣ್ಣ ಈರಪ್ಪ ಗುದಗಿ ಎಂದು ಹಿರಿಯರು ವಿವರಿಸುತ್ತಾರೆ. ಹಾಗೇ ಅಲ್ಲಿನ ಪಂದ್ಯದಲ್ಲಿ ಗೆದ್ದು ಮುನ್ನವಳಿ ಇಂದಾ ಹೂಲಿಕಟ್ಟಿ ವರೆಗೂ ಮೆರವಣಿಗೆ ಮಾಡಿದರು ಎಂದು ಹಿರಿಯರು ವಿವರಿಸುತ್ತಾರೆ. ಈ ಹಳ್ಳಿಯ ಬಗ್ಗೆ ಹೆಮಮೆಯೆನಿಸುತ್ತದೆ ಎಂದು ಹೇಳಿದರು.
