= Gokulnagar =

- Village
- Location in Karnataka, India Gokulnagar (India)
- Coordinates: 15.9857°N 75.32075°E
- Country: India
- State: Karnataka
- District: Belgaum
- Talukas: Ramdurg

Languages
  - Official: Kannada
- Time zone: UTC+5:30 (IST)

Gokulnagar is a village in Belgaum district in the southern state of Karnataka, India.
