= Narasapur, Belgaum =

Narasapur
- Town
- Country: India
- State: Karnataka
- District: Belgaum
- Talukas: Ramdurg

Languages
  - Official: Kannada
- Time zone: UTC+5:30 (IST)

Narasapur is a village in Belgaum district of Karnataka, India. The total geographical area of village is 808.34 hectares.
