= Hampiholi =

Coordinates: 15°54′N 75°24′E

- Village
- Interactive map of Hampiholi
- Country: India
- State: Karnataka
- District: Belgaum
- Talukas: Ramdurg

Languages
  - Official: Kannada
- Time zone: UTC+5:30 (IST)

Hampiholi is a village on the banks of river Malaprabha in Belgaum district, 14 kilometres (8.7 mi) from Ramdurga taluk in the southern state of Karnataka, India.
