= Chunchanur =

- Village
- Location in Karnataka, India Chunchanur (India)
- Coordinates: 15.95°N 75.30°E
- Country: India
- State: Karnataka
- District: Belgaum
- Talukas: Ramdurg

Population (2001)
  - Total: 5,100

Languages
  - Official: Kannada
- Time zone: UTC+5:30 (IST)

Chunchanur is a village in the southern state of Karnataka, India. It is located in the Ramdurg taluk of Belgaum district in Karnataka.

== Demographics ==
As of 2001 India census, Chunchanur had a population of 5100 with 2587 males and 2513 females.

== See also ==
- Belgaum
- Districts of Karnataka
