= Maradagi =

- Village
- Location in Karnataka, India Maradagi (India)
- Coordinates: 15°54′19″N 75°24′35″E
- Country: India
- State: Karnataka
- District: Belgaum
- Talukas: Ramdurg

Government
  - Type: Panchayat raj

Population (2011)
  - Total: 789

Languages
  - Official: Kannada
- Time zone: UTC+5:30 (IST)
- ISO 3166 code: IN-KA

Maradagi is a village in Belgaum district of Karnataka, India.

== Demographics ==
According to the 2011 Census of India, Maradagi has a total population of 789 with 125 households.

Demographics (2011 Census)
	Total	Male	Female
Population	789	413	376
Children aged below 6 years	89	48	41
Scheduled caste	14	8	6
Scheduled tribe	151	76	75
Literates	524	332	192
Workers (all)	350	234	116
Main workers (total)	123	100	23
Main workers: Cultivators	57	56	1
Main workers: Agricultural labourers	22	11	11
Main workers: Household industry workers	1	1	0
Main workers: Other	43	32	11
Marginal workers (total)	227	134	93
Marginal workers: Cultivators	11	6	5
Marginal workers: Agricultural labourers	198	117	81
Marginal workers: Household industry workers	1	1	0
Marginal workers: Others	17	10	7
Non-workers	439	179	260
