= Kadlikoppa =

- Village
- Interactive map of Kadlikoppa
- Coordinates: 15.855°N 75.301°E
- India: India
- State: Karnataka
- District: Haveri
- Established: 1994
- Talukas: Ramdurg

Government
  - Type: Panchayat raj
  - Body: Gram panchayat

Area
  - Total: 2.85 km^{2} (1.10 sq mi)

Population (2011)
  - Total: 615
  - Density: 216/km^{2} (559/sq mi)

Languages
  - Official: Kannada
- Time zone: UTC+5:30 (IST)
- ISO 3166 code: IN-KA
- Vehicle registration: KA
- Website: karnataka.gov.in

Kadlikoppa is a village in Belagavi in Ramdurg Karnataka, India. Kadlikoppa has a population of 1,864 people.
