= Hosakeri =

Hosakeri ಹೊಸಕೇರಿ
- Village
- Location in Karnataka, India Hosakeri (India)
- Coordinates: 15.930452°N 75.424349°E
- Country: India
- State: Karnataka
- District: Belgaum
- Talukas: Ramdurg

Government
  - Type: Panchayat raj

Population (2011)
  - Total: 1,235

Languages
  - Official: Kannada
- Time zone: UTC+5:30 (IST)

Hosakeri is a village in Belgaum district in the southern state of Karnataka, India. As of 2011, Hosakeri had a population of 1,235, of which 637 were male and 598 were female.
