= Sangal =

Coordinates: 24°50′N 73°38′E

- Village
- Interactive map of Sangal
- Country: India
- State: Karnataka
- District: Belgaum
- Talukas: Ramdurg

Languages
  - Official: Kannada
- Time zone: UTC+5:30 (IST)
- Postal code: 591127

Sangal is a village in Belgaum district of Karnataka, India.
