= Lakhanayakanakoppa =

- Village
- Interactive map of Lakhanayakanakoppa
- Coordinates: 15.878°N 75.324°E
- Country: India
- State: Karnataka
- District: Belgaum
- Talukas: Ramdurg

Languages
  - Official: Kannada
- Time zone: UTC+5:30 (IST)

Lakhanayakanakoppa is a village in Belgaum district in Karnataka, India.
