= Awaradi =

Awaradi Avaradhi
- Village
- Location in Karnataka, India
- Coordinates: 15.88°N 75.41°E
- Country: India
- State: Karnataka
- District: Belgaum

Languages
  - Official: Kannada
- Time zone: UTC+5:30 (IST)
- ISO 3166 code: IN-KA

Awaradi is a village in the Ramdurg Taluka of Belgaum district in the southern state of Karnataka, India. Shree Falaharshivyogiswar Math is famous in Avaradi Village, also a fete a famous festival of Falahareswar conducted in every December month on the Hostil full moon(ಹುಣ್ಣಿಮೆ). And also other temples in Avaradi, Durgadevi and choudeswari temple, Malingeswar temple, Basaveswer temple, Kalika Devi temple etc. Avaradi is located in the bank of the Malaprabha river, Avaradi is also famous in local yuvak Mandal, samara simha sangolli rayanna yuvak mandal, Shree Durga Devi yuvak mandal, Ambedkar Yuvak Mandal, Shree Falahareswer Yuvak Mandal, Mruttunjeya Yuvak Mandal, Basaweswer Yuvak Mandal, etc., these yuvak Mandals are conducted many sports entertainment programs in Avaradi. Shree Falahareswar math established many education trusts at avaradi, sureban(tq.Ramadurg), Menasagi(tq.Rona), and Naragunda(Di. GADAG). Gram panchayat in Avaradi village and 6000 population(2011) in this village. Government primary school and Shree Falahareswer Anupam viday mandir are educational schools they are 1st std to 7th standard.
