= Sunnal =

Village in Karnataka, India

- Village
- Location in Karnataka, India
- Coordinates: 15.96°N 75.26°E
- Country: India
- State: Karnataka
- District: Belgaum
- Taluka: Ramdurg
- Elevation: 577 m (1,893 ft)

Languages
  - Official: Kannada
- Time zone: UTC+5:30 (IST)
- Telephone code: 08335
- Nearest Town: Ramdurg
- Climate: hot (Köppen)

Sunnal is a village in Belgaum district of Karnataka, India.

Sunnal is a small village located five kilometres from Ramdurg on Belgavi road. This village is famous for its Maruthi Temple which has an idol of lord Hanuman from ancient times. It is believed by thousands of devotees that by praying to lord Hanuman at Sunnal one will be blessed twice by the lord Hanuman as his idol is seeing the devotees by both the eyes i.e., idol of lord Hanuman is in front facing towards the devotees. The Lord Hanuman temple of this village is popularly known as "Sunnal Hanumappa." The stretch of forest along Sunnal and Halloli Villages is inhabited by bears. These are popularly known as "Sunnal Karadi" or "Sunnal Kaddi" in Kannada.
