= Gudagoppa =

- Village
- Interactive map of Gudagoppa
- Coordinates: 16.061953°N 75.137025°E
- Country: India
- State: Karnataka
- District: Belgaum
- Talukas: Ramdurg

Population (2011)
  - Total: 1,684

Languages
  - Official: Kannada
- Time zone: UTC+5:30 (IST)
- Postal code: 591114
- Telephone code: 08336

Gudagoppa is a village in Belgaum district in the southern state of Karnataka, India. The village has population of 1684. 865 are males and 819 are females with 257 being children. The literacy rate of the village is low at 62.58% compared to Karnataka's average of 75.36%. Men are significantly more literate at 74.83% while women read at 49.57%.
