= Chiktadashi =

- Village
- Location in Karnataka, India
- Coordinates: 15°53′46″N 75°25′22″E
- Country: India
- State: Karnataka
- District: Belgaum
- Talukas: Ramdurg

Languages
  - Official: Kannada
- Time zone: UTC+5:30 (IST)

Chiktadashi is a village in Belgaum district in the southern state of Karnataka, India.
