= Shivapeth =

Coordinates: 15°53′N 75°24′E

- Village
- Interactive map of Shivapeth
- Country: India
- State: Karnataka
- District: Belgaum
- Talukas: Ramdurg

Languages
  - Official: Kannada
- Time zone: UTC+5:30 (IST)

Shivapeth is a village in Belgaum district of Karnataka, India. small village with the residents involved in agriculture and small scale cotton industries KHDC. Under Shindhe rule the village shifted from its actual location to present location due to malaprabha river canal project. The village have pleasant calm climate. Jadeshankara linga temple, Daneshwari temple and Veerabhadreshwar temple located at the heart of the village. Primary health care centre Govt. Pu college and primary school are the facility had by village. Most of the people of village are weavers. They produce cloth by the raw cotton provided by KHDC.
