= Chit (name) =

Chit (Burmese: ချစ်) is a Burmese name used by both genders. Notable bearers of the name include:

- Chit Chit (born 1996), Burmese football defender
- Chit Hlaing (1879–1952), Burmese politician
- Chit Ko Ko (1917–2008), Burmese botanist
- Chit Maung (1913–1945), Burmese journalist and writer
- Chit San Maung (guitarist), Burmese musician and guitarist
- Chit Swe (born 1932), Burmese Minister for Agriculture and Forestry
- Thakin Chit Maung (1915–2005), Burmese politician
- Walter Chit Tun (1898–1947), Burmese bodybuilder and weightlifter
