= Chetna (given name) =

Chetna is a feminine given name. Notable people with the name include:

- Chetna Maroo, Kenyan-born British author
- Chetna Pande, Indian actress and model
- Chetna Pandya, English actress
- Chetna Sinha, Indian social entrepreneur
