= M.Kallapur =

Coordinates: 15.9828°N 75.3866°E

- Village
- Interactive map of M.Kallapur
- Country: India
- State: Karnataka
- District: Belgaum
- Talukas: Ramdurg

Government
  - Type: Panchayat raj

Languages
  - Official: Kannada
- Time zone: UTC+5:30 (IST)

M.Kallapur is a village in Belgaum district in Karnataka, India.
