= Kalhal =

Coordinates: 15°51′N 75°27′E

- Village
- Interactive map of Kalhal
- Country: India
- State: Karnataka
- District: Belgaum
- Talukas: Ramdurg

Languages
  - Official: Kannada
- Time zone: UTC+5:30 (IST)

Kalhal is a village in Belgaum district in Karnataka, India.
