= Halolli =

Halolli ಕಲ್ಯಾಣ್ ನಗರ
- Village
- Country: India
- State: Karnataka
- District: Belgaum
- Talukas: Ramdurg

Government
  - Type: Panchayat raj

Population (2001)
  - Total: 950
  - Density: 800/km^{2} (2,100/sq mi)

Languages
  - Official: Kannada
- Time zone: UTC+5:30 (IST)
- Nearest city: Ramdurg
- Literacy: 50% (approximately)%

Halolli is a village in Belgaum district in the southern state of Karnataka, India.

The Malaprabha river is very near to the village.
