= Chit =

Chit may refer to:

- Chit (board wargames), a type of wargame counter
- Chit (name)
- Chit, a voucher or certificate with monetary value
- Blood chit, document requesting safe passage and assistance for military personnel stranded in enemy territory
- Chit fund, a savings scheme practiced in India
- Chitting, a method of preparing potatoes for planting
- Chit (consciousness), concept found in Indian religions

== See also ==
- Chita (disambiguation)
- Chitty Chitty Bang Bang
