= Thimmapur (Haveli), Warangal =

Thimmapur
- Neighbourhood
- Location in Telangana, India Thimmapur (India)
- Coordinates: 17.921224°N 79.572251°E
- Country: India
- State: Telangana
- District: Warangal

Government
  - Body: Greater Warangal Municipal Corporation

Population (2011)
  - Total: 7,513

Languages
  - Official: Telugu
- Time zone: UTC+5:30 (IST)
- Vehicle registration: TS
- Website: telangana.gov.in

Thimmapur (Haveli) is a neighbourhood of Warangal in Warangal district of the Indian state of Telangana. It is a part of Khila Warangal(Fort Warangal) mandal. Thimmapur (Haveli) was earlier a partly rural village and was later classified as a full outgrowth to the Warangal urban assemblage, becoming part of the Greater Warangal Municipal Corporation during the 2011 census.

Before independence Thimmapur & Alipur was under the Jagir administration of Sir Syed Abdul Razzaq Quadri Sufi Pasha Jagirdar he was one of the successor of Hazrat Mashooq e Rabbani famous Sufi saint in Warangal belongs to the family of Shaykh Abdul Qādir Jilani and his residence was known as Thimmapur Jagirdar Haveli or Bade Haveli.

Sufi Pasha with his sons Syed Shah Moosa Quadri -II Pir Syed Peer Shah Mohiuddin Quadri Murshid Pasha. (Successor) and others stayed here for a very long period.

== Sports ==
The Government of Telangana has given an in-principle approval to set up an international cricket stadium in Warangal. District administration officials identified 16 acres of land in Thimmapur, which is nearer to the old airport and fourth police battalion, that would provide air connectivity and security to the stadium.
