= Chiton (disambiguation) =

Chiton is a sub-family of marine molluscs in the family Chitonidae.

Chiton may also refer to:

- Chiton (garment), a form of clothing
- Chiton (genus), a genus of marine molluscs in the family Chitonidae
- Chiton, South Australia, a locality
