= Dadibhavi Salapur =

Dadibhavi Salapur Salpur
- Village
- Country: India
- State: Karnataka
- District: Belagavi
- Talukas: Ramdurg

Government
  - Type: Panchayat raj

Population (2001)
  - Total: 4,000

Languages
  - Official: Kannada
- Time zone: UTC+5:30 (IST)
- PIN: 591123
- Vehicle registration: KA 24
- Nearest city: Ramdurg
- Lok Sabha constituency: Belagavi
- Vidhan Sabha constituency: Ramdurg
- Climate: samshitoshna (Köppen)

Dadibhavi Salapur is a village in Belagavi district in the southern state of Karnataka, India.
