= Chit Swe =

Burmese politician and military officer

- ချစ်ဆွေ

Minister for Agriculture and Forestry Minister for Co‑Operatives Minister for Livestock and Fisheries
- In office 20 September 1988 – 23 July 1997

Personal details
- Born: 18 January 1932 (age 94) Mawlamyaing, Burma

Military service
- Allegiance: Myanmar
- Branch/service: Myanmar Army
- Rank: Lieutenant General

Lieutenant‑General Chit Swe (Burmese: ချစ်ဆွေ; born 18 January 1932) is a Burmese retired military officer and politician. He served as Minister for Agriculture and Forestry, Minister for Co‑Operatives and Minister for Livestock and Fisheries in Myanmar from 1988 until his retirement in 1997.

== Military career ==
Chit Swe rose through the ranks of the Myanmar Army, serving as head of the North Eastern Command and South Eastern Command. He was promoted to Brigadier General in the early 1980s and later to Major General in 1986, leading Bureau of Special Operations 2.

== Political career ==
On 20 September 1988, Chit Swe was appointed minister of three ministries: the Ministry of Agriculture and Forestry, the Ministry of Co‑Operatives, and the Ministry of Livestock and Fisheries. He was promoted to Lieutenant General on 18 March 1990. He later served specifically as Minister of Forestry until his retirement in 1997.

=== International representation ===
Chit Swe represented Myanmar in international forestry and agricultural forums. As Minister of Forestry, he delivered an opening address at the *Second Regional Seminar on Teak* hosted by the Food and Agriculture Organization (FAO) of the United Nations, highlighting sustainable forest management and international cooperation.

== Works ==
- Tay Ta Nae Mwe Ta Nae by Naung Sit Te
