= Sureban =

Sureban Shabhari Bana
- Village
- Location in Karnataka, India
- Coordinates: 15.88°N 75.39°E
- Country: India
- State: Karnataka
- District: Belgaum
- Taluka: Ramdurg
- Elevation: 557 m (1,827 ft)

Languages
  - Official: Kannada
- Time zone: UTC+5:30 (IST)
- PIN: 591127
- Nearest city: Hubli

Sureban (or Suribana, Kannada ಸುರೇಬಾನ) is a village in Belgaum district of Northern Karnataka, India. Usually the place is referred to as Sureban-Manihal (Manihal being the neighbouring village). They are separate villages, but in spirit are the same.

The houses are mainly constructed with mud and wood (pillars and rafters). The traditional mud houses exist even today, although a few houses have been converted to concrete. The ochre mud houses are a traditional local style.

Sureban is famous for its weavers' community. There are several local handlooms and powerlooms. Their sarees are famous for their checker and lines patterns. Locally made polycotton sarees are famous.

There are two major communities in Sureban. Devanga community (Vegetarians, worship at the Banashankari temple) and the Jada community (Non vegetarians, worship at the Chowdeshwari temple). Both of them belong to the weavers' community. They do not have any disputes among themselves.

The 'Santhe' (Temporary Market) takes place on Tuesdays and Fridays. People can buy vegetables, fruits, sweets, dresses etc. from people who are from nearby villages.

The name Sureban may be derived from the phrase Shabari Vana (Shabari's Garden). There is a belief that Shabari was waiting for Lord Rama a place nearby sureban. The area is popularly known as 'Shabari Kolla'. Locals worship Shabari as Mother and there is a Temple dedicated to her.

== Education ==
Primary schools in Sureban:

- Pragati Vidyalaya School
- Anupama School
- Public Primary Government school.

High schools in Sureban:

- Shri Gurudev Atmanand Girls High School.
- Shree Palahareshwar Boys High School.
- Public Government High school.

Colleges in Sureban:

- Shree Palahareshwar PU and Degree college
- Government PU and Degree college

== Tourism ==
Shabari kolla is a favorite picnic spot nearby. It is located between the hills around 3.0 km from Sureban village heading towards Ramdurg, Shabari mata's temple which is worshiped by all the people is situated here. It is a place with full of trees and two beautiful ponds beside the temple. People used to come to this place in summer season to enjoy swimming in ponds. There is small pond connecting to the main pond. The water level in the pond remains the same throughout the year.

Sureban is also the one among the few places in India where 'ChithaBasma' (Ashes) of Mahatma Gandhi has been kept.

Manihal is famous for Ashrams of Shree Shivanand Swamiji and Shree Atmanand Swamiji.
