= Chetana (Surat) =

- Type: Monthly
- Publisher: Vasant Dalal
- Editor: Ishwarlal Desai
- Founded: 1954
- Political alignment: Praja Socialist Party
- Language: Gujarati language
- Headquarters: Surat
- Circulation: 1,000 (1956)

Chetana (Gujarati: ચેતના, 'Consciousness') was a Gujarati-language monthly publication, issued as the organ of the Praja Socialist Party in Surat, India. Established in 1954, It was printed at Arun Printing Press and had a circulation of 1,000.

Ishwarlal Desai was the editor of Chetana, and Vasant Dalal the publisher.
