= Chetna Sinha =

Indian social entrepreneur

Chetna Gala Sinha
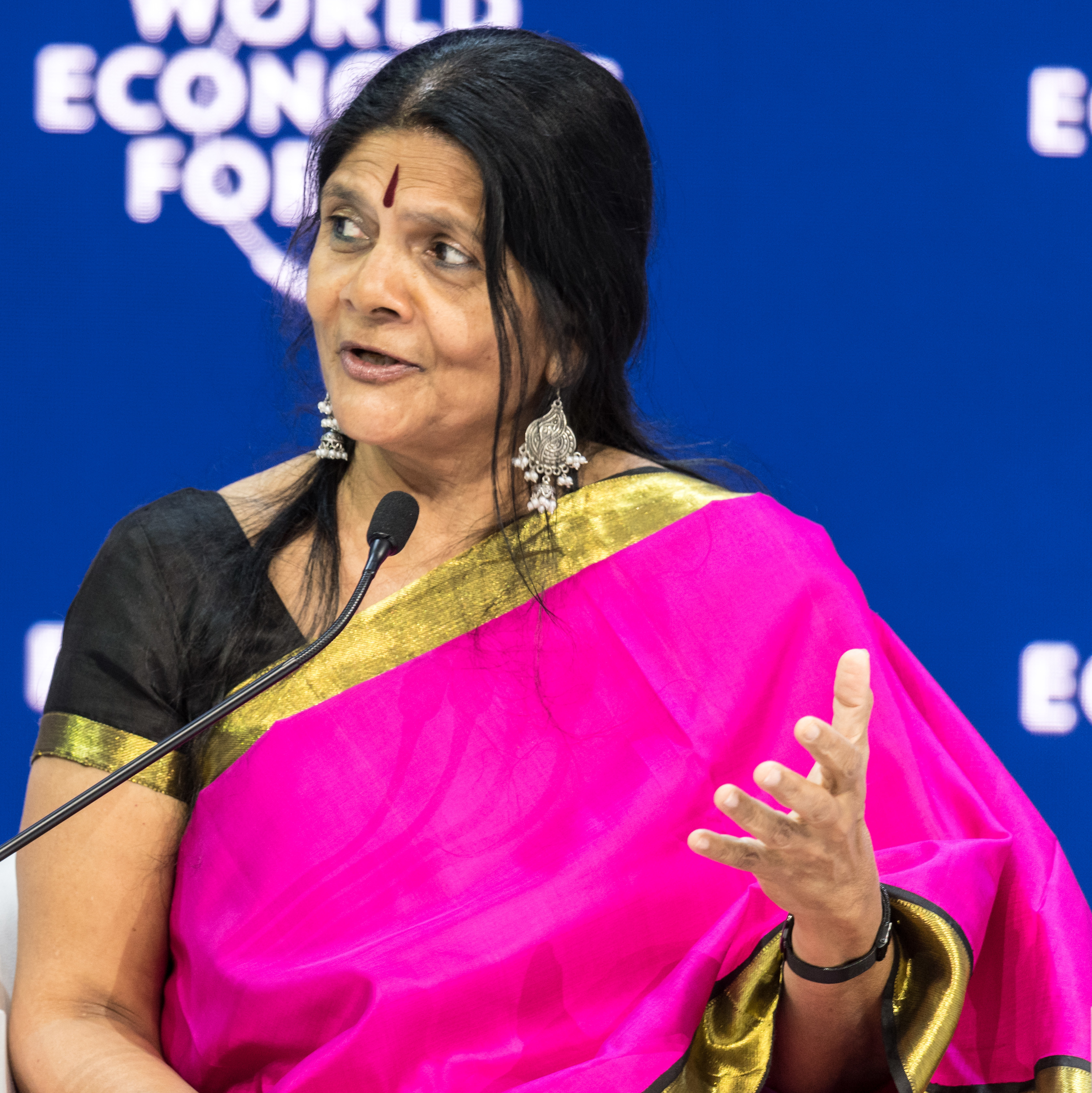
- Sinha at the World Economic Forum in 2018
- Born: 1958 (age 68); Bombay, Maharashtra, India
- Education: University of Mumbai
- Occupations: Founder / Chair of Mann Deshi Bank & Mann Deshi Foundation
- Known for: Microfinance
- Spouse: Vijay Sinha
- Children: 3
- Website: manndeshifoundation.org

Chetna Gala Sinha (born 1958) is an Indian social entrepreneur working to empower women in areas of rural India by teaching entrepreneurial skills, access to land and means of production.

Sinha and six other women chaired the 48th Annual Meeting of the World Economic Forum in Davos, Switzerland in January 2018. Sinha has been awarded the Nari Shakti Puraskar, India's highest civilian award for women. She is a Member of the BRICS Women's Business Alliance and is also a member of the Gender Equality Advisory Council (2022) appointed during Germany's G7 Presidency.

In 1997, she set up the Mann Deshi Mahila Sahakari Bank – India's first bank for and by rural women. Mann Deshi Bank had 100,000 account holders and had loaned over US$50 million to support female micro-entrepreneurs in 2018. Mann Deshi Foundation runs Business Schools, a Community Radio and a Chambers of Commerce for rural women micro entrepreneurs. In 2022, it has supported over 850,000 women.

Chetna Sinha is a Yale Fellow, a Schwab Fellow and an Ashoka Fellow.

== Early life ==
Born in Mumbai, she earned her master's degree in Commerce and Economics at the University of Mumbai in 1982.

== Career ==
Sinha grew up in Mumbai in the 1970s and 1980s in the heyday of political activism. While in college, she graduated with a Bachelor's Degree in Commerce and then has a Master's Degree in Economics from Mumbai University. She was drawn to Jayaprakash Narayan's brand of politics.

Her first stumbling block came when the Reserve Bank of India (RBI) declined her application for establishing Mann Deshi Mahila Sahakari Bank, in 1996, on the grounds that some of the promoting members were non-literate. Sinha came back to the village dejected, but the other villagers pushed her to organise literacy classes. In five months, Sinha went back to the RBI with a fresh application and the women from the village. This time, the Bank approved their application and issued them a license, making Mann Deshi Mahila Bank India's first bank for and by rural women.

She is the founder and chairperson of the Mann Deshi Mahila Sahkari Bank, a microfinance bank which lends to women in rural areas. She is also the founder and president of the Mann Deshi Foundation. Mann Deshi Mahila Sahkari Bank was the first bank in the country for and by rural women to get a cooperative license from Reserve Bank of India. In the two decades since the bank was set up (in 1997) with a working capital of ₹708,000 raised from among its 1,335 members, it has reached over 310,000 women (84,000 among them borrowers), providing them with the financial backing and emotional impetus to become successful entrepreneurs.

The drive remained relevant even after two decades, when the Government of India announced demonetisation in 2016. Mann Deshi officials collected coins from the State Bank of India and went from door-to-door and in the weekly markets to exchange them for old ₹500 notes.

The Mann Deshi Foundation also runs financial literacy classes, where women are taught the ropes of savings, investing, insurances and loans through modules that comprise games like Monopoly. According to the Foundation, there has been an increase of ₹13,200 in the average annual income of rural women after they’ve taken business development classes at the school.

Chetna Sinha and six other women chaired the 48th Annual Meeting of the World Economic Forum in Davos-Klosters, Switzerland, on 23–26 January 2018. The exclusive women's team included: Sharan Burrow, general-secretary, International Trade Union Confederation (ITUC), Belgium; Fabiola Gianotti, director-general, European Organisation for Nuclear Research (CERN), Geneva, Switzerland; Isabelle Kocher, CEO, ENGIE, France; Christine Lagarde, managing director, International Monetary Fund, Washington DC; Ginni Rometty, chairman, president and chief executive officer, IBM Corporation, US; and Erna Solberg, Prime Minister of Norway.

Today, the Mann Deshi Bank has 100,000 account holders, has loaned over $50 million and regularly creates new financial products to support the needs of female micro-entrepreneurs. Mann Deshi runs Business Schools, a Community Radio and a Chambers of Commerce for rural women micro entrepreneurs. To date, it has supported nearly half a million women.

She is an Ashoka fellow.

== Awards and recognition ==
- "Entrepreneurship Development Award" on 29 July 2010 by Entrepreneurs’ International, Pune.

Chetna Sinha received the first Godfrey Phillips Bravery Amodini Award on 11 September 2009 by Godfrey Phillips.

Chetna Sinha received "Rani Laxmiibai Puraskar" on 7 March 2009 from Cyclo Transmissions Ltd., Satara. This award is given to the women who have done outstanding work in various fields.

Jankidevi Bajaj Puraskar Award for Rural Entrepreneurship 2005.

Shri Nanaji Deshamukh and the Rajiv Sheth Sabale Foundation Award 1999 presented by for work completed with drought-affected women. Governor of Maharashtra Shri P. C. Alexander Award 1994 for work in development.

Chetna Sinha is Yale Fellow, Schwab Fellow and Ashoka Fellow.

She was a speaker at TEDxGateway in 2013. She also spoke at Ted2018 in Vancouver. She was also ranked amongst the top 10 International Women’s Day (IWD) Speakers in 2021 by Indian Speakers Bureau.

Forbes India Leadership Award 2017: Entrepreneur With Social Impact

Chetna Gala Sinha has been awarded the Nari Shakti Puraskar, India's highest civilian award for women who work in the area of women's empowerment

== Personal life ==
Chetna is the mother of three sons and lives in Mhaswad, where Mann Deshi Mahila Bank has its headquarters.

== Mann Deshi Bank ==
Mann Deshi Mahila Sahkari Bank is a microfinance bank which lends to women in rural areas. In response to the demonetisation of 500 and 1000 rupee banknotes by the Indian government, Mann Deshi bank is now helping rural people by providing 500 rupees of coin in exchange for 500 rupee notes. In this crisis of demonetization of paper currency the people most affected are those in rural areas. Mann Deshi Bank has a business school on wheels through which it provides training to rural women.
