= Thimmapuram, Kakinada mandal =

Thimmaparam
- Village
- Interactive map of Thimmaparam
- Location in Andhra Pradesh, India Thimmaparam (India)
- Coordinates: 17.031346°N 82.2462°E
- Country: India
- State: Andhra Pradesh
- District: Kakinada district

Languages
  - Official: Telugu
- Time zone: UTC+5:30 (IST)
- PIN: 533005

Thimmaparam is a village situated in Kakinada district, in Andhra Pradesh. It comes under Kakinada rural mandal. The distance from kakinada bus stand to Thimmapuram village is 8 km.
