= Hirekoppa K.S. =

- Village
- Country: India
- State: Karnataka
- District: Belgaum

Hirekoppa K.S. is a village in Belgaum district in the southern state of Karnataka, India. It falls under Ramadurga Taluka of Belgaum (Formerly called Belagavi) district of Karnataka.

Eminent persons:

1. Dr. D S Karki. (Noble Kannada Poet) famous for his “Hachevu Kannadada Deepa, Karunaada deepa Sirinudiya Deepa”. The village is the birthplace of the legendary poet and where he spend most of his childhood moments.
2. M R Panchagavi (Eminent Advocate and Politician) also known as Gokak Gandhi spent most of his life in this place. He has inspired hundreds of present-day politicians to enter politics and serve society.

== Census ==
As per the 2011 Population Census, the village has a total population of 2,837.
