= Chetana Jagrati Punj =

Indian welfare society

- Founded: 19 August 2009
- Type: Non-governmental organisation
- Location: India
- Coordinates: 27.88°N 78.08°E
- Key people: Rajesh Chauhan (President); Wasim Ahmed (Gen.Secretary); Rajkumar Sharma (Treasurer)

Chetana Jagrati Punj (established on 19 August 2009) is a welfare society which is working for agriculture, art and culture, education and literacy, and environment and forests. Its state office is in Aligarh, Uttar Pradesh.

== Aim and objects ==
Animal husbandry, dairying and fisheries, aged/elderly, agriculture, art and culture, biotechnology, children, civic issues, differently abled, disaster management, Dalit upliftment, drinking water, education and literacy, environment and forests, food processing, health and family welfare, HIV/AIDS, human rights, information and communication technology, legal awareness and aid, labour and employment, microfinance, minority issues, new and renewable energy, nutrition, panchayati raj.

Executive committee details:

- President: Mr. Rajesh Chauhan (Mob 9997526458)
- General Secretary: Mr. Wasim Ahmed
- Treasurer: Mr. Rajkumar Sharma
- Member: Mrs. Archna
- Member: Mr. Nilendra Singh
- Member: Mr. Mohisin Ali
- Member: Mr. Riyajuddin

== Head office ==
A-11, Okhala, Jamiya Nagar, New Delhi-110025
