= Chaitanya (name) =

Chaitanya or Chaithanya may refer to the following people

Given name

- Chaitanya Bishnoi (born 1994), Indian cricketer
- Chaitanya Choudhury, Indian television actor and model
- Chaitanya Krishna, South Indian actor
- Chaitanya Lakshman (born 1968), Fiji Indian lawyer, social worker and politician
- Chaitanya Mahaprabhu (1486–1533), Indian spiritual teacher
  - Chaitanya Charitamrita, a biography of Chaitanya Mahaprabhu
  - Chaitanya Bhagavata, a hagiography of Chaitanya Mahaprabhu
- Chaitanya Singha Dev, 18th century king of the Mallabhum
- Chaitanya Tamhane (born 1987), Indian film director

Surname

- K. M. Chaitanya, Indian film director, documentary maker
- Krishna Chaitanya (lyricist), Telugu lyricist, writer and director
- Naga Chaitanya (born 1986), Indian film actor
- Nitya Chaitanya Yati, Indian philosopher, psychologist, author and poet
