= Mudenur =

Village in India

- Village
- Location in Karnataka, India Mudenur (India)
- Coordinates: 15°54′N 76°18′E
- Country: India
- State: Karnataka
- District: Koppal

Government
  - Type: Panchayat raj
  - Body: Gram panchayat

Languages
  - Official: Kannada
- Time zone: UTC+5:30 (IST)
- ISO 3166 code: IN-KA
- Website: karnataka.gov.in

Mudenur is a village in Koppal district of Karnataka, India.
