= Hulkund =

Coordinates: 12°50′N 75°58′E

Hulkund Hulkund
- Village
- Interactive map of Hulkund
- Country: India
- State: Karnataka
- District: Belgaum
- Talukas: Ramdurg

Languages
  - Official: Kannada
- Time zone: UTC+5:30 (IST)
- PIN: 591114
- Nearest city: Mudhol, Ramdurg, Gokak

Hulkund is a village in Belgaum district in the southern state of Karnataka, India.

It has Ramlingeswar Temple.
