= Batakurki =

Batakurki - ಬಟಕುರ್ಕಿ ಬಟಕುರ್ಕಿ
- Village
- Location in Karnataka, India Batakurki - ಬಟಕುರ್ಕಿ (India)
- Coordinates: 16°04′N 75°22′E
- Country: India
- State: Karnataka
- District: Belgaum
- Talukas: ramadurg

Population (2001)
  - Total: 5,000

Languages
  - Official: Kannada
- Time zone: UTC+5:30 (IST)
- PIN: 591123
- Nearest city: lokapur

Batakurki is a village in Belgaum district in the southern state of Karnataka, India.
