= Toranagatti =

Coordinates: 14°27′N 76°21′E

Toranagatte
- Village
- Interactive map of Toranagatte
- Country: India
- State: Karnataka
- District: Davanagere

Languages
  - Official: Kannada
- Time zone: UTC+5:30 (IST)

Toranagatti is a village in Belagavi district of Karnataka, India.
