= Somapur =

- Village
- Country: India
- State: Karnataka
- District: Haveri
- Talukas: shigov

Government
  - Type: Panchayat raj

Languages
  - Official: Kannada
- Time zone: UTC+5:30 (IST)
- ISO 3166 code: IN-KA

Somapur is a village in Haveri district of Karnataka, India.
