= Halagatti =

- Village
- Country: India
- State: Karnataka
- District: Belgavi

Languages
  - Official: Kannada
- Time zone: UTC+5:30 (IST)

Halagatti is a village in Belgavi district in the southern state of Karnataka, India.
