= Chatan, Iran =

Chatan چتان
- Village
- Location within Iran
- Coordinates: 35°30′10″N 46°52′33″E
- Country: Iran
- Province: Kurdistan
- County: Sanandaj
- Bakhsh: Central
- Rural District: Sarab Qamish

Population (2006)
  - Total: 423
- Time zone: UTC+3:30 (IRST)
  - Summer (DST): UTC+4:30 (IRDT)

Chatan (Persian: چتان, also Romanized as Chatān and Chetān; also known as Chatāq and Chitān) is a village in Sarab Qamish Rural District, in the Central District of Sanandaj County, Kurdistan Province, Iran. At the 2006 census, its population was 423 across 82 families. The village is populated by Kurds.
