= Godachi =

Human settlement in India

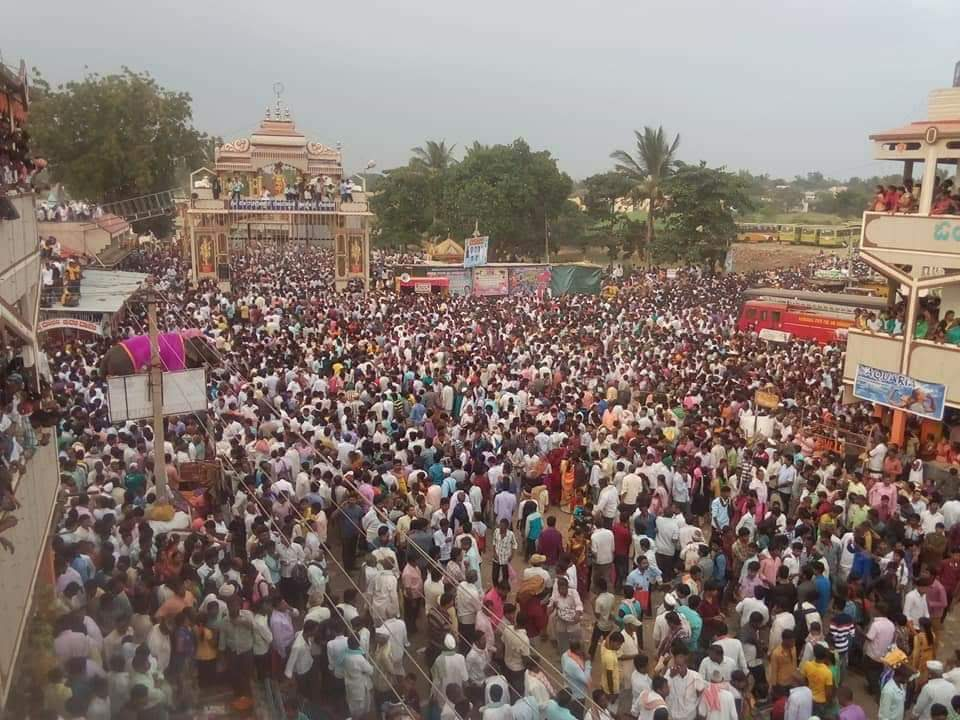
Crowds Gathered at Godachi on a Festival Day

Godachi is one of the major pilgrim centres in Belagavi District and is located near Ramdurg Taluk, of Belgaum district, in the Indian State of Karnataka. Its temples include Veerabhadra, Kalamma and Maruti Temples.

It is located at a distance of 14 km from Ramdurg. The address of the temple is, Shree Veerabhadreshwara Temple, At Post: GODACHI-591114, Taluk : Ramdurg, Dist:Belagavi (Katnataka State).

There is sufficient bus facility available to visit this place by govt bus service i.e NWKRTC buses.

The nearest major train station to Godachi is BADAMI at a distance of 50 km. The nearest Airports are Belagavi (75 km) and Hubli (100 km). Godachi is very well connected to all major highways.

The place is well known for the teample Shri Jagruta Veerabhadreshwara Temple, means lord with his war avatara.

== Etymology ==
The name of the place is derived from that of the plant kodachi or godachi (Zizyphus xylopyrus), which grows abundantly in the area.

== Temples ==
The Veerabhadra Temple in Vijayanagar style has a garbhagriha with a chalukyan doorway and a spacious main hall. The Veerabhadra image is of later date. For many of the families in North Karnataka, Lord Veerabhadra is the kula devate means their Family God. Hence we many marriages being held in this temple since long time.

People visit this place daily, and more on Amavasya or Poornima days. The Temple has choultries all around. The annual Jatra is held in honour of Veerabhadra in December, when more than 30,000 people assemble. The copper plates of Chalukya Kirti-Varman were found here. According to legend, Shivasharanas on the way to Ulvi fought a battle here. The former Jahgirdar of Torgal shinde family is the trustee of the Veerabhadra temple.
