= Lucian Chețan =

Romanian footballer

Lucian Cheţan
Personal information
- Full name: Lucian Călin Cheţan
- Date of birth: 25 June 1985 (age 41)
- Place of birth: Târgu Mureș, Romania
- Height: 1.78 m (5 ft 10 in)
- Positions: Defender; midfielder

Youth career
- 1995–2004: Sporting Piteşti

Senior career*
Years	Team	Apps	(Gls)
2004	Gaz Metan Mediaș	0	(0)
2005–2007	Tricolorul Breaza	?	(?)
2006	→ Poiana Câmpina (loan)	5	(0)
2007	Concordia Chiajna	7	(0)
2008–2012	Sportul Studențesc	60	(3)
2008–2012	→ Sportul Studențesc II	?	(?)
2012	Săgeata Năvodari	4	(0)
2013	Inter Clinceni	?	(?)
2014	Mioveni	9	(0)
2014–2015	Sighetu Marmației	?	(?)
Total		85+	(3)
- * Club domestic league appearances and goals as of 14 March 2018

Lucian Călin Cheţan (born 25 June 1985) is a Romanian former footballer who played as a defender or midfielder for various teams such as: Concordia Chiajna, Sportul Studențesc, Săgeata Năvodari or Mioveni, among others.
