= Chitting =

Preparation of tubers for planting

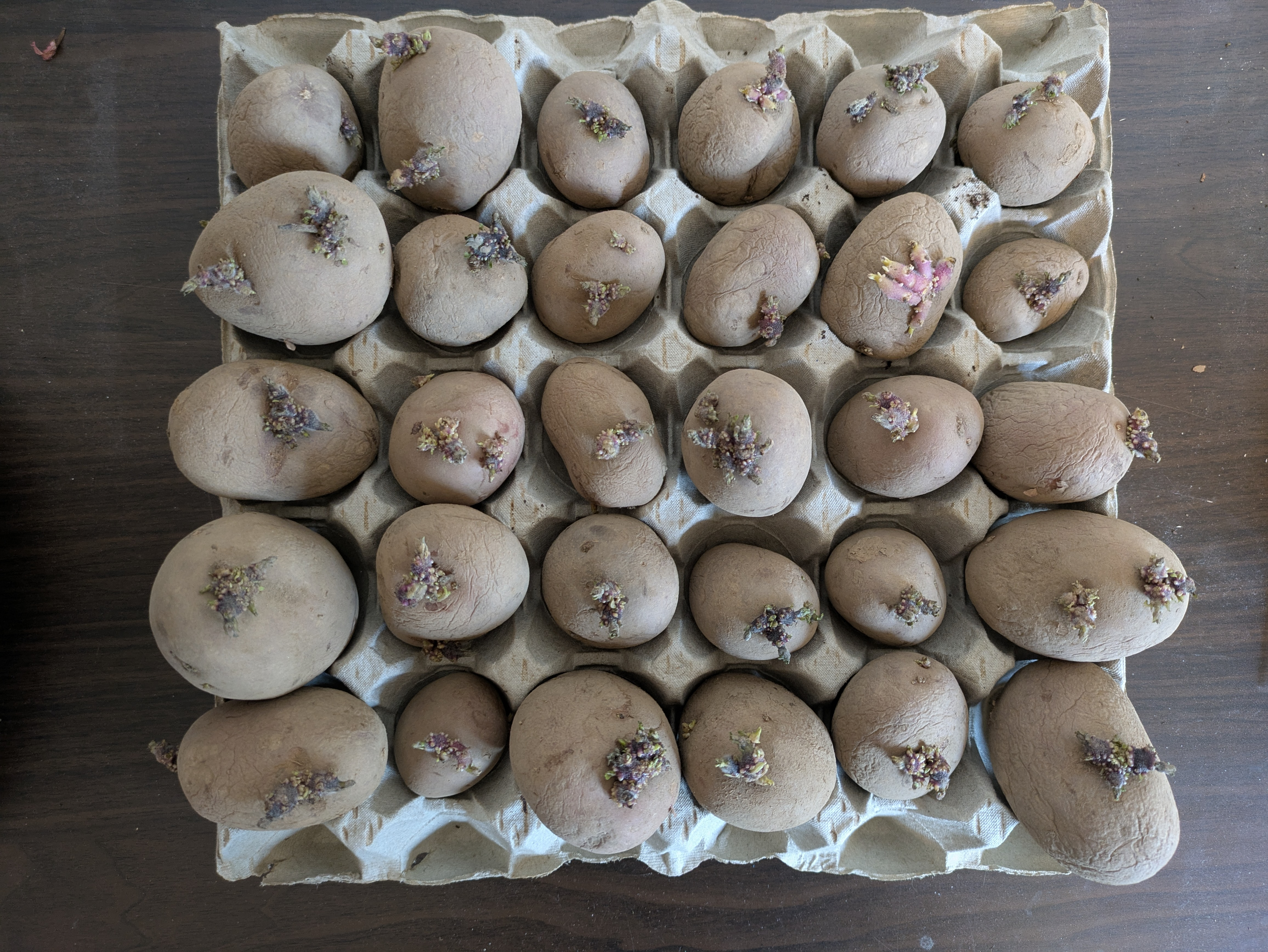
Chitted seed potatoes

Chitting is a method of preparing potatoes or other tubers for planting. The seed potatoes are placed in a tray (often in egg cartons) in a light and cool place but shielded from direct sunlight. All but three or four of the "eyes" (sprouting parts) of the potato are removed, leaving the strongest growths only. After the sprouts are about 1 inch (2.5 cm) long, the seed potatoes are planted in the ground.
