= Chetan, Iran =

Village in Mazandaran province, Iran

Chetan Persian: چتن
- Village
- Location within Iran
- Coordinates: 36°20′39″N 51°28′13″E
- Country: Iran
- Province: Mazandaran
- County: Nowshahr
- District: Kojur
- Rural District: Panjak-e Rastaq

Population (2016)
  - Total: 511
- Time zone: UTC+3:30 (IRST)

Chetan (Persian: چتن) (Note: Also known as Chasan, Chetīn, Chītan, Chīten, Chitin, and Chittin) is a village in Panjak-e Rastaq Rural District of Kojur District in Nowshahr County, Mazandaran province, Iran.

== Demographics ==
=== Population ===
At the time of the 2006 National Census, the village's population was 568 in 134 households. The following census in 2011 counted 573 people in 158 households. The 2016 census measured the population of the village as 511 people in 166 households, the most populous in its rural district.
