= Ramdurg =

- Town
- Location in Karnataka, India
- Coordinates: 15.95°N 75.3°E
- Country: India
- State: Karnataka
- District: Belagavi district
- Founded: 1799 (227 years ago)
- Named for: Lord Ram

Government
  - Type: Panchayat Samiti

Area
  - Total: 3.57 km^{2} (1.38 sq mi)
- Elevation: 570 m (1,870 ft)

Population (2011)
  - Total: 39,841
  - Density: 8,915.97/km^{2} (23,092.3/sq mi)

Languages
  - Official: Kannada
- Time zone: UTC+5:30 (IST)
- PIN: 591123
- Telephone code: 08335
- Vehicle registration: KA 69
- Website: ramdurgatown.mrc.gov.in

Ramdurg or Ramadurga is a town in Belagavi district in the Indian state of Karnataka. The name of the town derives from Rama (Lord Rama), as it is believed that Lord Ram, lived here during his exile. The town gives its name to Ramdurg taluka, a subdivision of Belagavi district.

== History ==
The royal state of Ramdurg, founded in 1799, was one of the non-salute princely states of British India under the Bombay Presidency and later the Deccan States Agency. The Konkanasth dynasty area measures 438 square kilometres (169 sq mi). According to the 1901 census, the population was 37,848. Ramdurg acceded to the Dominion of India on 8 March 1948, and is currently part of Karnataka state.

== Location ==
Ramdurg is known for its hills, sugar factories, river and trekking. There are many important places near Ramdurg, such as Shabari Kolla, Godachi, Navilu Teerth, Big Shiva Statue, Hoovina Kolla, Sunnal Hanumappa, Megundappan Kolla, Ramdurg Forts and Toragal Forts. Almost all villages that come under Ramdurg talluk are historic places.

== Demographics ==
According to the national census, the town had a population of 29,651 in 1991, rising to 36,649 in 2001 and declining to 34,800 in 2011. The population is virtually equal between males and females. The town is considered 100% urban.

The unemployment rate is 60%, well above the national average of 3.46%. There is 37.5% "usually employed", 4.6% "casually employed" and 57.9% not employed. These terms describing levels of employment are from the Indian census process.

The 2011 census indicated a relatively high literacy rate. Although there are different numbers with a declining trend, the official census in 2011 reported that 81.8% of the local residents were literate.

== Culture ==
Godachi Fair at Godachi, 16 km (9.9 mi) from Ramdurg, is a major fair of the district held in December, attracting people from Siddu Khanpeth, Torgal, Halolli, Sunnal, Budnur, Batakurki, Halgatti, Sureban, Katkol, Chandaragi, Salahalli, Obalapura and Mudkavi.

Moharm festival is held at Yarikittur village.

3 kilometres (1.9 mi) away is Sureban and Manihal, a rich holy place which is a popular tourist destination. There are several temples including:

- Shree Shabhari Deevi – located in a dense forest with dramatic changes during the seasons. There is a belief that Shabari was waiting for Rama in this place.
- Shree Atmananda Aasharma
- Shree Shivananda Hill (Betta)
- Shree Manageramma Hill
- Shree Falahaareswara Temple
- Ramatirtha

Sureban is also amongst the few places in India where 'ChithaBasma' (Ashes) of Father of Nation Mahathma Gandhiji has been kept.

Sunnal is a small village near Ramdurg, which is 5 km (3.1 mi) from Ramdurg on Belgavi road. This village is the location of a Maruthi Temple, popularly known as "Sunnal Hanumappa", which has an idol of Lord Hanuman from ancient times. It is believed by thousands of devotees that by praying to Lord Hanuman at Sunnal, one will be blessed twice by the lord Hanuman as his idol is seen by the devotees by both eyes. The stretch of forest along Sunnal and Halloli has bears known as "Sunnal Karadi" or "Sunnal Kaddi" in Kannada. Most famous local fare war

venkateshwar (vekappana teru) which teru (ತೇರು) it will turn full one round in right side direction it was most famous

It is located in Dodamangadi Tree Park (Mullur Gudda), which stands 2.3 km from Ramdurg. • The statue was unveiled in 2018, and draws large numbers of tourists, and visitors to date. • It was raised to commemorate the Mahashivaratri festival that year. • At 78 feet tall, this is one of India’s tallest Shiva Murti statues. • Ramdurg’s Shiva Murti cost the state around INR 1.5 Crore to construct. • The statue was built by Sridhar Murthy with assistance from family members

Statue of Lord Shiva on the outskirts of Ramdurg.

== Hospitals ==
Hospitals within Ramdurg include:Kulgod Multispeciality Hospital Biggest hospital for all specialities in ramdurga. Others include Shree Sai Multispeciality Dental Hospital, Apte Hospital, Bilagi Hospital, Government Hospital, Kulkarni Hospital, Dhoot Hospital, Agadi Hospital, Kanbur Hospital, Kambi Hospital, Patavardan Hospital, Guru Hospital, Pavate Hospital, Gunda Pediatric Hospital, Varnika Super Speciality Eye Hospital and many more.

== Transport ==
The closest airport is Belgaum Airport at distances of 77 and 98 km (48 and 61 mi).

The closest railway stations are Bagalkot railway station and Hubli-Dharwad railway station at distances of 40 and 90 km (25 and 56 mi).

The closest cities in the district are Dharwad, Belagavi, and Bagalkote, at distances of 70–100 km (43–62 mi).

The KSRTC (Karnataka State Road Transport Corporation) bus facility connects to major cities of Karnataka and also Pune, Aurungabad, Tuljapur and south Maharashtra.

VRL Logistics provides private bus services from Ramdurg to Bangalore .

== Education ==
Schools within Ramdurg include: Adarsha Vidyalaya, C.D. Halyal High School, Taluka Anjuman High School, Government Urdu High School, Pragati Vidyalaya, Samarpana vdyapeetha, Government Boys and Girls School, Vidya Prasark Samiti school, Basaveshawar High School, Cambridge English Medium School, C.S. Bembalagi Science College, Smt. I.S. Yadawad Govt. First Grade degree College, Govt. P.U. College, Smt. Nagamma Kulgod Para Medical Sciences. Many more schools exist within Ramdurg.
