= 106th =

106th is the ordinal form of the number 106. 106th or One hundred and sixth may also refer to:

- A fraction, 1/106, equal to one of 106 equal parts

== Geography ==
- 106th meridian east, a line of longitude
- 106th meridian west, a line of longitude

== Military ==
- 106th Brigade (disambiguation)
- 106th Division (disambiguation)
- 106th Regiment (disambiguation)

== See also ==
- April 16, 106th day of the year in a standard year
