= 106th Regiment of Foot =

Three regiments of the British Army have been numbered the 106th Regiment of Foot:

- 106th Regiment of Foot (Black Musqueteers), raised in 1761
- 106th Regiment of Foot (1794), raised in 1794
- 106th Regiment of Foot (Bombay Light Infantry), raised by the East India Company and placed on the British establishment as the 106th Foot in 1862
