= Town Moor =

Town Moor may refer to the following places in England:

- Town Moor, Doncaster, South Yorkshire, which comprises Doncaster Racecourse and Doncaster Town Moor Golf Club
- Town Moor, Newcastle upon Tyne, Tyne and Wear
- Town Moor, Sunderland, Tyne and Wear
