= 106th Division =

In military terms, 106th Division or 106th Infantry Division may refer to:

- 106th Division (People's Republic of China)
- 106th Infantry Division (Wehrmacht), Germany
- 106th Division (Imperial Japanese Army)
- 106th Guards Airborne Division, Russia/Soviet Union, previously the 106th Guards Rifle Division
- 106th Rifle Division, Soviet Union
- 106th Rifle Division (1941 formation), Soviet Union
- 106th Infantry Division (United States)

== See also ==
- List of military divisions by number
- 106th Brigade (disambiguation)
- 106th Regiment (disambiguation)
- 106th Squadron (disambiguation)
- 106th (disambiguation)
