= 106th Regiment =

106th Regiment may refer to:

== American Civil War regiments ==
- 106th Illinois Infantry Regiment
- 106th New York Infantry Regiment
- 106th Ohio Infantry Regiment
- 106th Pennsylvania Infantry Regiment
- 106th United States Colored Infantry Regiment

== Other uses ==
- 106th Regiment of Foot (disambiguation), British Army regiments
- 106th Aviation Regiment
- 106th Cavalry Regiment, US Army
- 106th Infantry Regiment (United States)
- 106th Infantry Regiment (PA), Philippine Commonwealth Army
- 106th (Yeomanry) Regiment Royal Artillery

== See also ==
- 106th Brigade (disambiguation)
- 106th Division (disambiguation)
