= 106th Regiment of Foot (Bombay Light Infantry) =

2nd Bombay European Regiment (to 1862) 106th Regiment of Foot (Bombay Light Infantry)
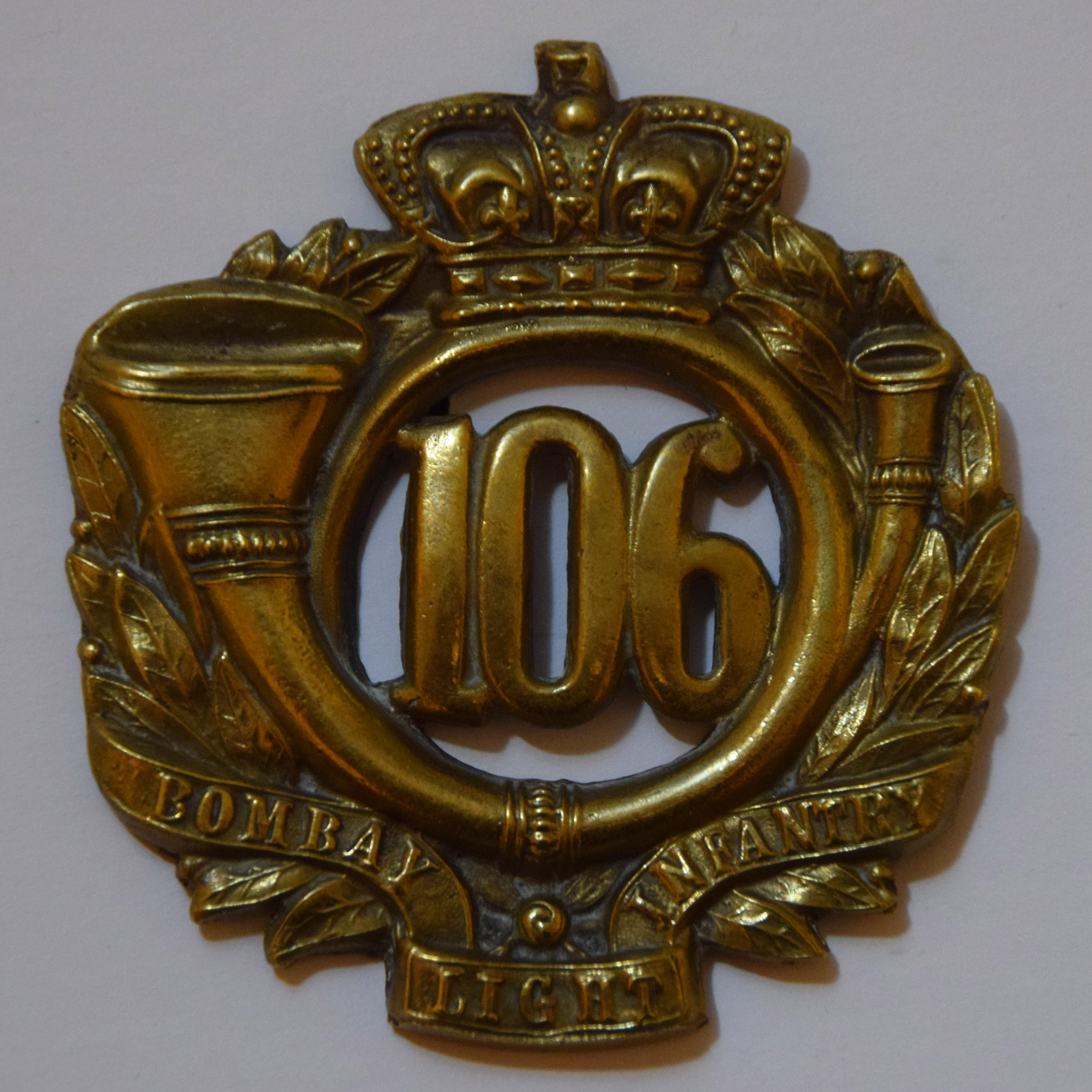
- Glengarry badge of the 106th regiment of Foot
- Active: 1839-1881
- Country: East India Company (1839–1858); United Kingdom (1858–1881)
- Branch: Bombay Army (1839–1862); British Army (1862–1881)
- Type: light infantry
- Size: One battalion
- Garrison/HQ: Sunderland Barracks from 1872
- Colours: Facing Colour: Pale Buff to 1842; White
- March: "Paddy Carey"

The 106th Regiment of Foot (Bombay Light Infantry) was an infantry regiment of the British Army from 1862 to 1881, the third to bear the number after the Black Musqueteers (1761–1763) and a regiment raised briefly in 1794. It was formed by renaming the 2nd Bombay European Regiment, formed by the Honourable East India Company in 1839. In 1881 the 106th Regiment was joined with the 68th (Durham) Regiment of Foot (Light Infantry) to form the Durham Light Infantry, as its second regular battalion.

== History ==
=== Origins ===
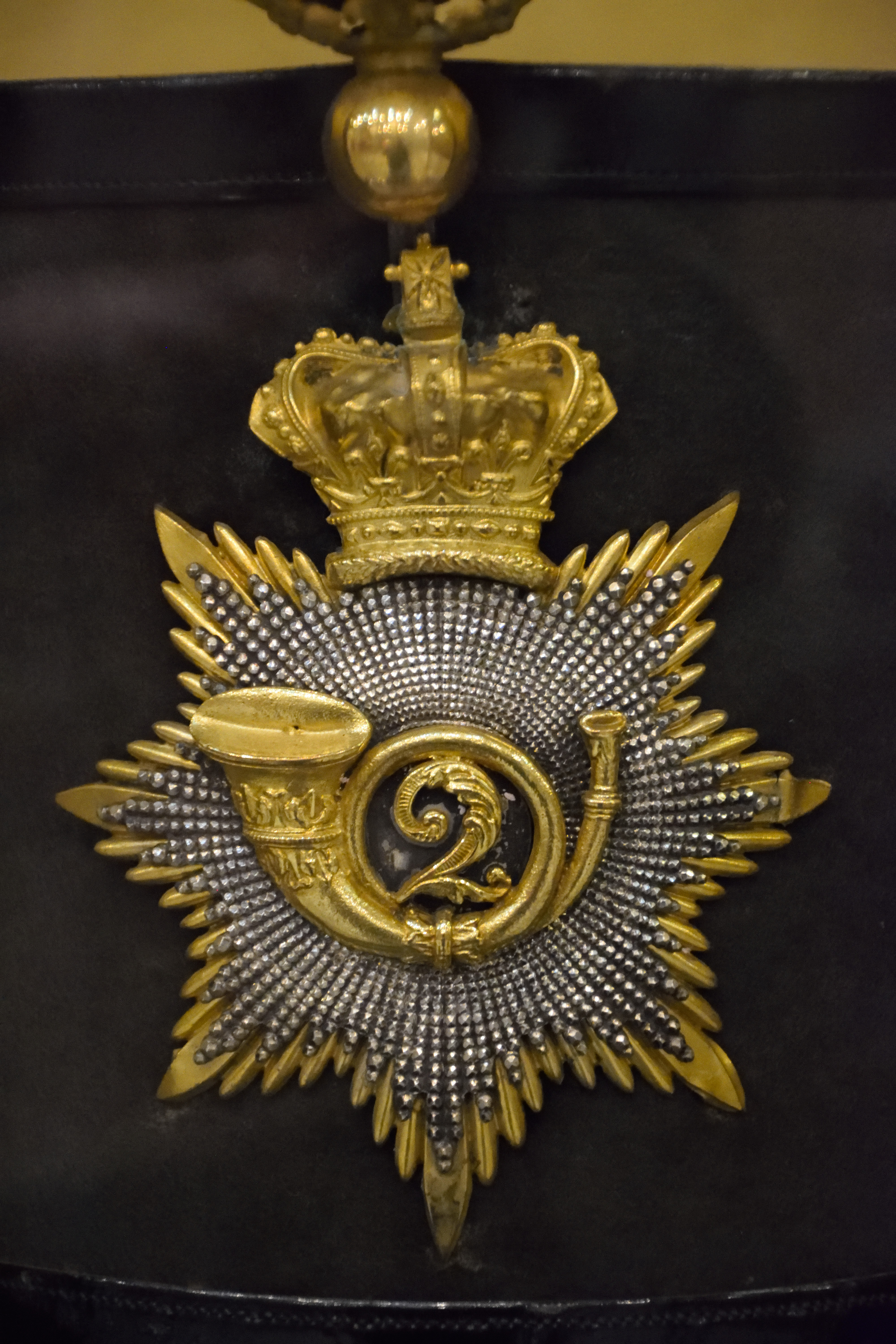
Officer's shako plate of the 2nd Bombay European Regiment, 1837-1862, from the Durham Light Infantry museum

On 29 July 1839 the East India Company resolved to add a regiment of infantry to each of the armies of the Presidencies (Bengal, Madras and Bombay). The smallest Presidency thus gained the 2nd Bombay (European) Regiment at Pune, based around a cadre of officers and men from the 1st Bombay European Regiment returned from Kharg Island and Aden. (Note: A 2nd battalion of the Bombay European Regiment had been formed on three occasions, 1768–1778, 1788–1796 and 1824–1829, and was sometimes called the 2nd Regiment.) The regiment was intended from the start to be a light infantry regiment, and although the order for that was revoked in January 1840, it was reinstated in that November. By that time the regiment was over its establishment strength of 967 officers and men including 87 men from the wreck of the Lord William Bentnick.

=== Early deployments ===
The first deployment of the regiment occurred when Sir Charles Napier annexed Sindh using troops from the Bombay presidency. The regiment was used to replace garrison troops used for that expedition and from March 1843, one wing was based in Bhuj, the other wing had been sent to Karachi. By October, 276 out of 437 men of the Buhj wing were sick with malaria. The whole regiment was then moved back to Belgaum in March 1844 to recover.

Later in the year a detachment of 225 officers and men was formed and sent to Kolhapur State, together with other Native, European and Crown forces, after a revolt had broken out over the Company policies in the area. The effects of malaria were still present however, when the detachment was inspected on 16 September before it marched off:

It did not escape my observation, the delicate and sickly appearance of many of the 200 men from the 2nd Europeans.

— General Delamotte, commander of the Southern Division of the Army,

Once there however the regiment participated in the storming of Samangarh fort on 12 October, with detachments on both storming columns together with 20th Madras Native Infantry, 23rd Bombay Native Infantry with additional covering riflemen. On 1 December the regiment's men were also involved in taking Panhala Fort with companies from the 21st Bombay Native Infantry, 16th and 23rd Madras Native Infantry and 2nd Regiment. That same evening 50 men from the 2nd Europeans with the men from 20th Madras N.I. and the 22nd Regiment forced their way into nearby Pawangarh, with Private Daniels and Bugler Toole, the first men in. On 9 December Rangna fort was evacuated after a stockade before it was broken by a column of 100 men of the regiment in a frontal attack. By the end of the year and into 1845 the force was increasingly dispersed to deal with the many forts on the area and farther away as the rebels dispersed. The regiment's first 'campaign' cost it 13 dead and 31 wounded.

In 1846 the 2nd Europeans were presented with their first colours while at Belgaum. The regiment was then moved from India to the Aden Colony (now in Yemen), relieving the 94th Regiment, returning to India in two wings, one in January 1848 which initially went to Poona and the other in December 1849. The wing in Poona transferred 100 volunteers to its parent regiment which took part in the Second Sikh War. In November 1853, after marching to Karachi, the regiment supplied a cadre of officers and men (together with the 1st regiment) to form the 3rd Bombay European Regiment. In December it was moved again to Hyderabad, where in 1854 it was to suffer from malaria and in December 1855 had its name altered to the 2nd European Regiment, Bombay Light Infantry.

=== Persia ===
In 1856 and the outbreak of the Anglo-Persian War (part of the movements in the Great Game), the 2nd Europeans were organised into part of a 2nd Brigade of an expeditionary field force and were sent to Karachi, where they were made up to an establishment of 929 of all ranks. In November they left for the Persian Gulf and landed at Hillilah Bay, south of the port of Bushire on 7 December. Intending to capture the port, the expedition commander, Maj. General Stalker assaulted a road block of some 1-2000 tribesman at Reshire with two companies of the 2nd Europeans and two of the 4th Bombay Native Infantry and covered by 3rd Regiment of Bombay Light Cavalry on 9 December. Driving the Tribesmen from the village, the remainder retired to an old Dutch fort, which was surrounded and assaulted by the 2nd Europeans, 64th Regiment and 20th Bombay Native Infantry.

The next day the ships of the Indian Navy subjected the town of Bushire to bombardment for two hours which led to its surrender as the troops were approaching the walls by land.

By the beginning of February 1857, after the arrival of a second division and more cavalry, the commander Sir James Outram launched an attack on the Persian's camp at Borazjan. On 3 February, a force of 5000 men set out, with nearly 700 of the 2nd Europeans, on a 46-mile journey with no tents, over harsh terrain. The Persians were surprised on the afternoon of 5 February and fled, their stores and arms were destroyed. Returning to Bushire on 7 February the rear guard was attacked by Persian Cavalry at 11p.m., near the village of Koosh-ab and the column circled to protect the baggage train. At daybreak the 2nd Europeans were in the front line of the attack as the Persians fell back under cavalry and artillery assault. The regiment lost three killed and eight wounded. The regiment did not take part in the expedition to the Shatt al-Arab and remained at Bushire until 15 May, returning to Karachi at the end of the Month.

=== Indian Mutiny ===
The Indian Mutiny had begun in March in the Bengal Presidency, would not see such intensity in the Bombay Presidency, and the regiment would see a mostly policing role. While in Karachi, 118 men volunteered for the 1st European Regiment and left for Multan on 1 June. Only two of the 32 native infantry battalions mutinied, and only the 27th Bombay Infantry went so far as to kill some of their officers. The left wing of the regiment was sent to Bombay in August, and was immediately split up into companies and smaller detachments to police the region at Begalum, Ratnagiri and Kolhapur. In September, the right wing, after disarming the 21st Bombay N.I., was sent to Vengurla, shortly joining the detachment at Begalum, then reinforcing the Kolhapur detachment and sending others to Dharwar and Kaladgi.

The detachment of 100 men sent to Kolhapur arrived on 16 August, and the next day with 450 of the Kolhapur Local Infantry, disarmed the 27th Bombay N.I., a court-marshal convicted 21 of the leading mutineers. These men were executed with eight of them being blown from cannon. The detachment was reinforced by 67 men from Begalum and Ratnagiri, and on 5–6 December succeeded in suppressing a rising in the city with the loss of only two men.

In February 1858 a detachment of 89 men from Kaladgi joined a field force which left the boundaries of the Bombay Presidency for Shorapur, only to find a rising there defeated by other company forces.

=== Crown Service ===
As a consequence of the mutiny, in August "An Act for the Better Governance of India" was passed in the British Parliament, it reached the troops in India in a proclamation on 1 November. The Company forces were now to be Crown forces, this precipitated the White mutiny over the terms of enlistment in many of the newer Company regiments. Men who did not wish to become Crown soldiers were allowed to take their discharges, and from the 2nd Europeans 379 men did so in July 1859, leaving for England from Goa.

On 3 November 1859 the regiment was renamed Her Majesty's 2nd Regiment of Bombay European Light Infantry, and presented with new colours in November 1860 in Bombay, which included the generous allocation of battle honours from the Persian expedition granted in October 1858. During 1859 and 1860 there was much debate on the future of the former Company regiments, "amalgamation" with the British Army, with service anywhere in the Empire and being based in Britain were seen as the only option for the Companies European forces. The 101st to the 109th Regiments were thus created, based on the older Company regiments, with the remains of younger Company regiments, such as the 4th, 5th and 6th Bombay Europeans filling their ranks. On 30 July 1862, while in the unhealthy station of Mimach in Rajputana, the 11 officers and 501 men of the 2nd Europeans became Her Majesty's 106th Regiment of Foot (Bombay Light infantry) commanded by Colonel Robert William Disney Leith.

The regiment stayed in Nimach until January 1864, moving to Nasirabad where it suffered a cholera outbreak losing 10 men. In 1867 the regiment marched 600 miles to Main Mir where it suffered more seriously from cholera losing 53 men.

==== 1866 Jervis court-martial ====
On 25 June 1866, the regiment's Captain Ernest Scott Jervis, was court-martialed. He was found guilty of insubordination, but acquitted on charges of misappropriating goods, which included the Commander-in-Chief of the forces in India's mutton and pickles. The Court found that he be should dismissed from service but also recommended mercy. The Commander-in-Chief, Sir William Mansfield, instead had Jervis dismissed and his name 'struck off the returns' of the 106th. The case was widely reported and the process, and Mansfield himself, were subject to criticism over the way the matter was handled. Mansfield, it was said:

...has hunted his victim, to ruin with a ruthless and persevering energy which could not have been exceeded if it had been directed against the enemies of his country ... It is impossible to believe that a man who could so stultify himself and disgrace his high office and his English blood can be allowed to retain the all but most responsible post in India.

In September, 1867, Prince George, Duke of Cambridge, Commander-in-Chief of the Forces (military head of the British Army), sent a dispatch to Mansfield in which he severely rebuked him, but also censured 'in the strongest terms, the reprehensible insubordination' of Jervis. The following month, the matter was raised in the British parliament, with further criticism of Mansfield, but a vote to restore Jervis to his position was defeated 60 to 48. (Note: In 1871, Mansfield was raised to the peerage as William Mansfield, 1st Baron Sandhurst. Jervis was declared bankrupt in 1875, and sentenced to time in jail in 1882.)

==== To Britain ====
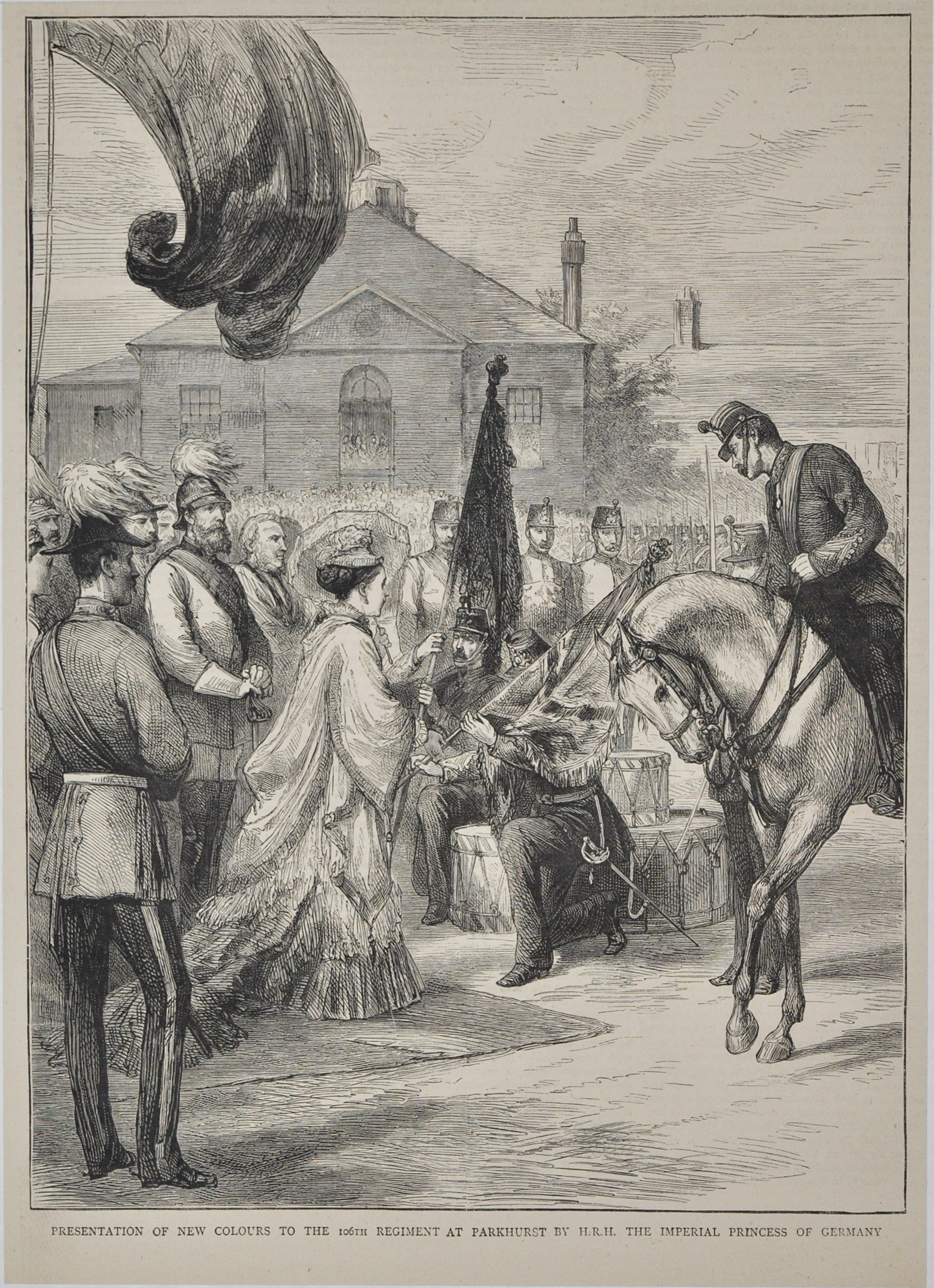
A wood engraving from The Graphic magazine of the presentation of new Colours to the 106th Regiment of Foot in 1874.

The effects of cholera, the discharge of older men from Company days and the arrival of large drafts from the regiment's Depot, which had been moving around Britain (including Ireland) as a normal Crown Depot, sped the assimilation into the British Army. The regiment moved to Ambala in 1867 and then to Jhansi in 1870.

The localisation scheme of the Cardwell Reforms resulted in the regiment being paired with the 68th Regiment, and assigned to district no. 3 at Sunderland Barracks in Sunderland, where it was to share premises with the Depots of the 68th and the District Brigade the next year. In December 1873, 20 officers and 672 men (with 52 women and 102 children) embarked at Bombay for Portsmouth.

While stationed on the Isle of Wight new colours were presented by the Princess Royal on 14 August 1874, with the 1860 colours laid up at St. Thomas' church in Newport. In 1879 while at Preston, the regiment sent 455 men to its linked regiment while it was in India. In March 1880, now only 16 officers and 381 men strong, the regiment was transferred to Ireland.

=== Amalgamation ===
On 1 July 1881, while the regiment was in the Royal Barracks in Dublin, the men were paraded and informed that as part of the Childers Reforms they were now amalgamated with the 68th (Durham) Regiment of Foot (Light Infantry) into one regiment, to become the 2nd Battalion of the Durham Light Infantry.

== Battle honours ==
Reshire, Bushire, Koosh-Ab, Persia

== Colonels ==
Colonels of the Regiment were:

2nd Bombay (European) Regiment (HEIC)

- Col. George Benjamin Brooks, October 1839 – 1840
- Col. Sir Ephraim Gerrish Stannus, C.B., 1840 – May 1850
- Maj. Gen. Foster Stalker, May 1850 – March 1857
- Maj. Gen. Thomas Chase Parr March 1857 – September 1862

106th Regiment of Foot (Bombay Light Infantry) (British Army)

- Gen. Sir David Capon, K.C.B., 30 September 1862 – December 1869
- Gen. Maurice Barlow, C.B., Chevalier Legion of Honour 18 December 1869 – August 1870
- Gen. Hon. Sir George Cadogan, K.C.B., 9 August 1870 – May 1874
- Gen. Sir William O'Grady Haly, K.C.B., 17 May 1874 – November 1875
- Gen. Sir John Jarvis Bisset, K.C.M.G., C.B, 2 November 1875 – May 1893

== Bibliography ==
- Ward, S G P (2005) [1962]. Faithful. The Story of the Durham Light Infantry. Naval and Military Press. ISBN 978-1-84574-147-1.
- Vane, Hon. W L (1914). The Durham Light Infantry. The United Red and White Rose. London: Gale & Polden. OCLC 7279713.
