= Terdal =

Terdal Teradala, Theradal
- Town
- Location in Karnataka, India
- Coordinates: 16.5°N 75.05°E
- Country: India
- State: Karnataka
- District: Bagalkot
- Taluka: Terdal; Rabkavi Banhatti

Government
  - Body: Town Municipal council
- Elevation: 536 m (1,759 ft)

Population (2001)
  - Total: 26,088

Languages
  - Official: Kannada
- Time zone: UTC+5:30 (IST)
- PIN: 587315
- ISO 3166 code: IN-KA
- Vehicle registration: KA 48(Jamakhandi) KA 29(Bagalkot)
- Website: www.terdaltown.mrc.gov.in

Terdal is a Municipal town in Bagalkot district in the Indian state of Karnataka.

== Geography ==
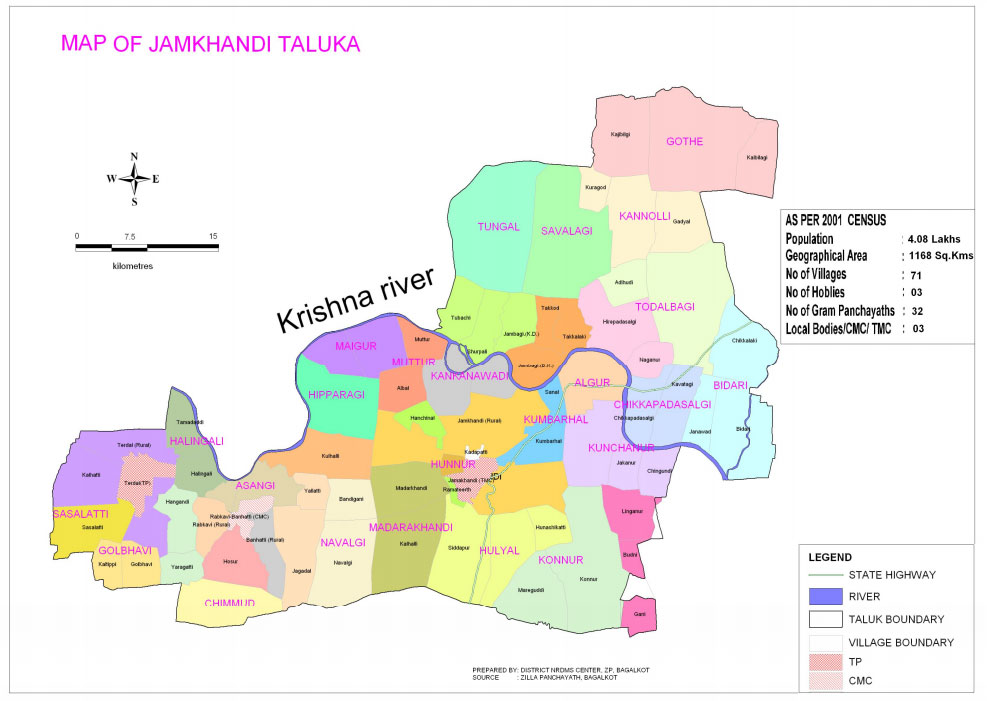
Jamkhandi Taluk Map before creation of Terdal and Rabkavi-Banhatti Taluk

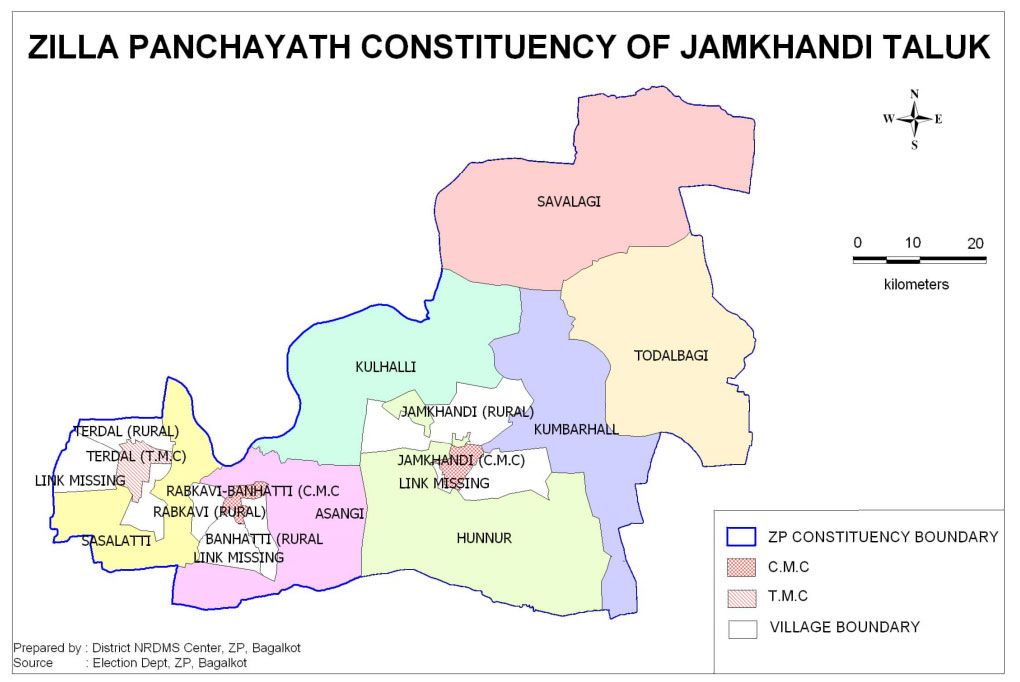
Jamkhandi Taluk ZP Constituency Map before creation of Terdal and Rabkavi-Banhatti Taluk

Teradala is located at 16.5°N 75.05°E. It has an average elevation of 536 metres (1758 feet). It lies in the northwest of Bagalkot district, bordering Belagavi district. The town covers a total area of about 8.25 km².

== Demographics ==
As of 2011 India census, Terdal had a population of 26,153. Males constitute 51% of the population and females 49%. The average literacy rate is 54%, lower than the national average of 59.5%: male literacy is 63%, and female literacy is 44%. 14% of the population is under 6 years of age.

Religions in Terdal Taluk (2011) (Including all villages under Terdal taluk)
Religion	Percent
Jainism	40.52%
Hinduism	37.48%
Islam	20.52%
Others†	1.48%
Distribution of religions
