= Lakhamapura =

- village
- Location in Karnataka, India Lakhamapura (India)
- Coordinates: 15.8645°N 75.6209°E
- Country: India
- State: Karnataka
- District: Bagalkot

Government
  - Type: Panchayat raj
  - Body: Gram panchayat

Languages
  - Official: Kannada
- Time zone: UTC+5:30 (IST)
- PIN: 587 201
- ISO 3166 code: IN-KA
- Vehicle registration: KA-29, KA48
- Website: karnataka.gov.in

Lakhamapura is a village in the Badami taluk of Bagalkot District in Karnataka State.

== Importance ==
Lakhamapura is a Middle Palaeolithic site in the Kaladgi basin. Quartzitic artefacts such as handaxes and cleavers have been excavated in Lakhamapura village.

== See also ==
- Badami
- Bagalkot
- Kudalasangama
- Karnataka
