= Donnison School =

English girls' school

Coordinates: 54.908054°N 1.367701°W

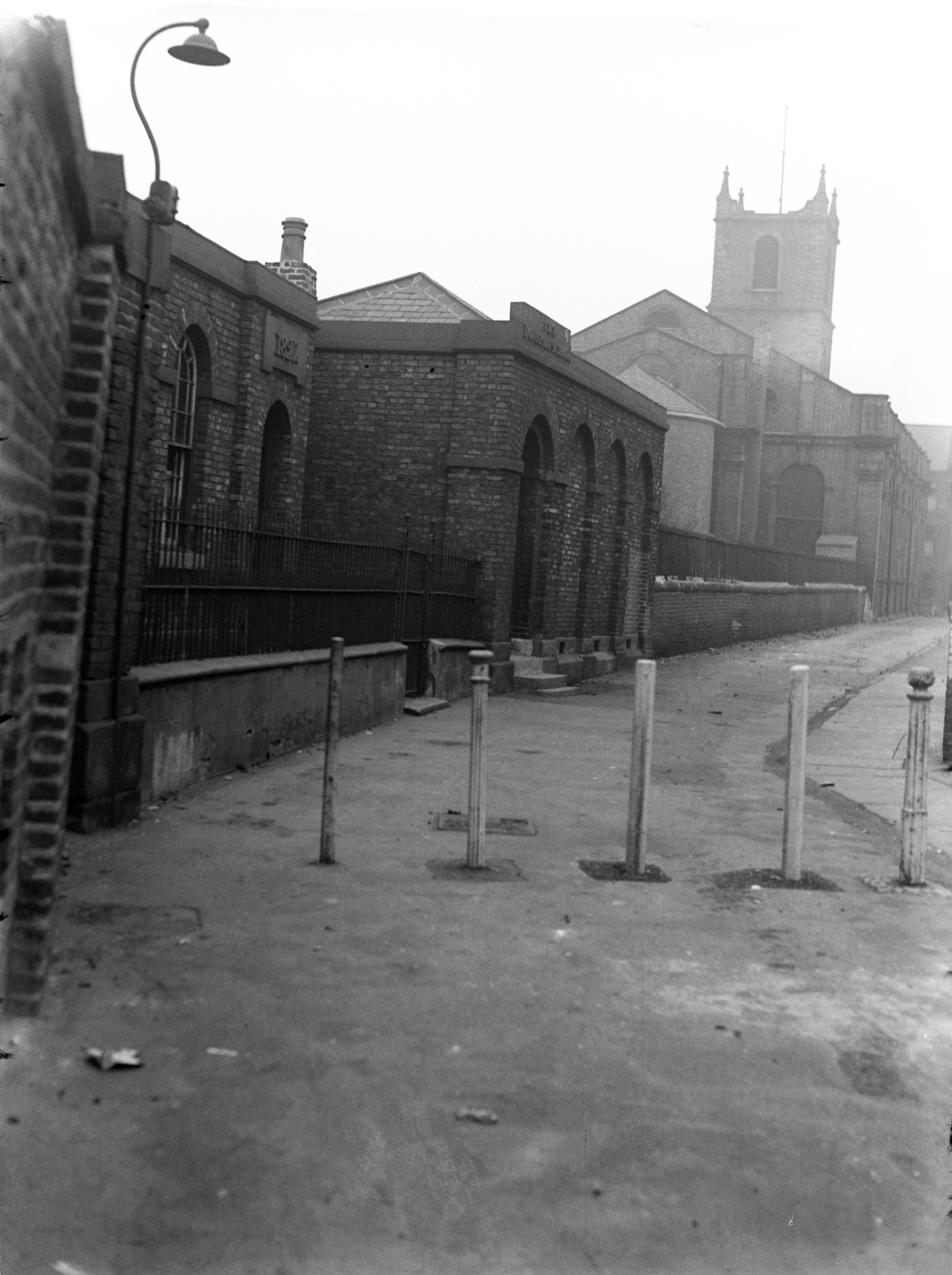
- An external view of the Donnison School in March 1944

Information
- Former name: The Girls' Free School
- Established: 1798
- Founder: Elizabeth Donnison
- Closed: c.1905-1910
- Gender: Girls

Donnison School (initially known as The Girls' Free School) is an English former school in the East End neighbourhood of Sunderland. It opened in 1798 to provide a free education to girls, funded by a bequest from Elizabeth Donnison. In the early 21st century it became a media and heritage centre.

== Early history and curriculum ==
When she died in 1764, school founder Elizabeth Donnison left £1500 in her will to fund a school which would provide a free education for female pupils from poor families.

The school opened to 36 pupils in 1798 and was also known as The Girls' Free School. Students from the ages of 7 to 16 were taught needlework, spinning, sewing and knitting in addition to reading and writing. Pupils were also provided with clothes and shoes. This type of charity school for deprived girls was part of a wider movement to educate girls and women in Britain, but the Donnison School was the first of its kind in Sunderland. The school was located next to the Sunderland workhouse, constructed in 1740.

Elizabeth Donnison was married to Sunderland businessman James Donnison, who died in 1777. This was her second marriage, having previously been married to Charles Guy. Elizabeth Donnison was featured in the 'Rebel Women of Sunderland Project', an exhibit commissioned by Sunderland Culture and created by novelist Jessica Andrews and illustrator Kathryn Robertson in 2020.

In 1827, Elizabeth Woodcock funded the construction of a schoolmistress' cottage on the site.

The school closed at some point between 1905-1910 and the buildings became the caretaker's cottage to the Church of the Holy Trinity. They were Grade II listed in 1978.

== Current usage ==
During the 20th century, Donnison School fell into disrepair. In 2001 it was purchased by the charity Living History North East from the Church of England. Five years later, the charity received a grant of £287,000 from Sunderland City Council and the National Heritage Lottery Fund to repair and refurbish the school. It became known as the Donnison School Heritage and Education Centre in 2007, hosting lectures, school visits, and a regional oral history centre.

The school building and schoolmistress' cottage is in the East End neighbourhood of Sunderland, an area also referred to as 'Old Sunderland'. The buildings are located on Church Walk near the Trafalgar Memorial and the Holy Trinity Church, near to Sunderland Town Moor and the Sunderland Docks.
