= 106 Squadron =

106 Squadron or 106th Squadron may refer to:

- 106 Squadron (Israel)
- 106 Squadron SAAF, South Africa
- No. 106 Squadron IAF, India
- No. 106 Squadron RAF, UK
- 106th Air Refueling Squadron, US Air Force
- VFA-106, US Navy
- VP-106, US Navy
