= Holy Trinity Church, Sunderland =

Church in Tyne and Wear, England

Holy Trinity Church
- Sunderland Parish Church
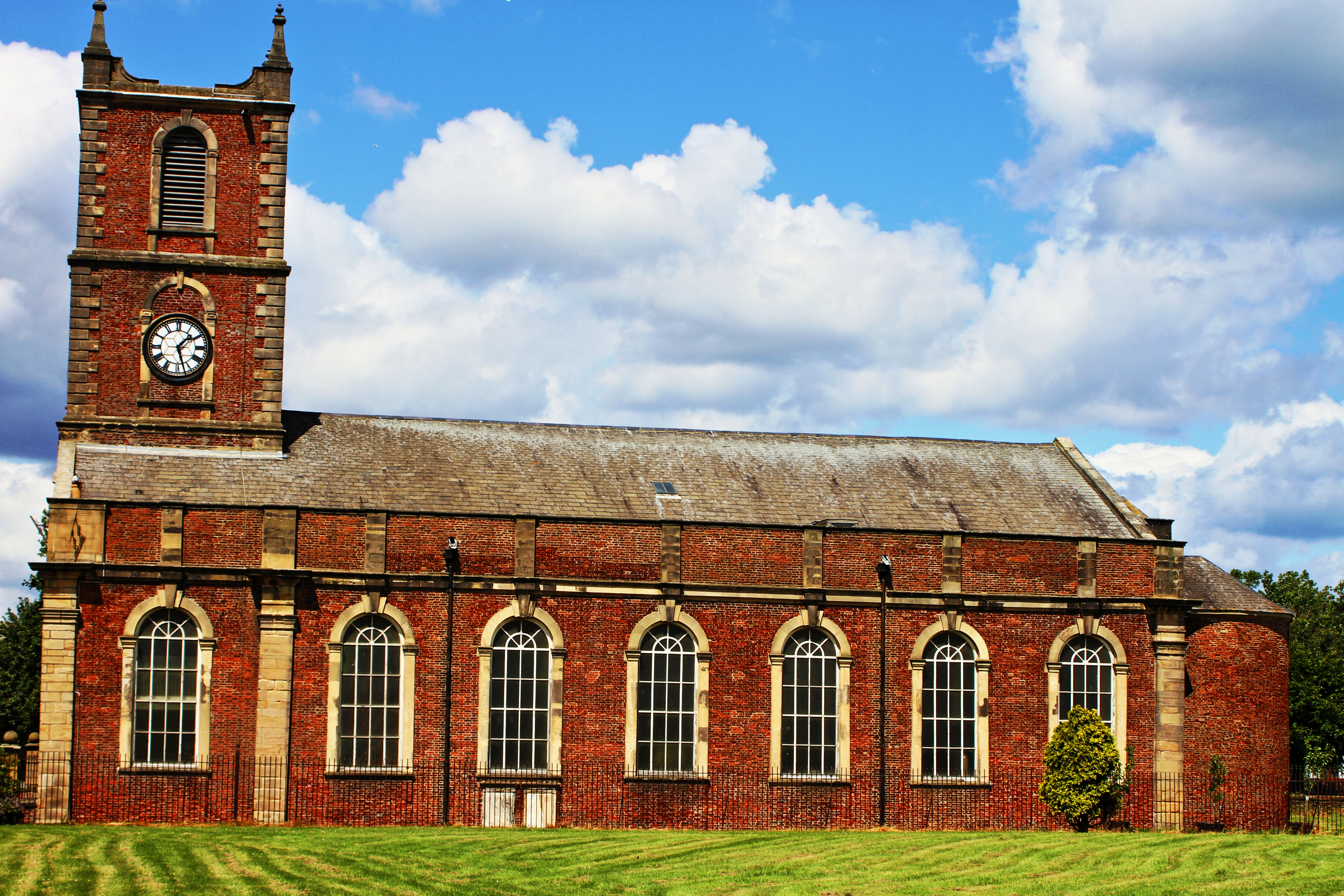

- Holy Trinity Church within Tyne and Wear
- 54.907765°N 1.368648°W
- OS grid reference: NZ 40575 57188
- Location: Church Street East, Sunderland, Tyne and Wear SR1 2BJ
- Country: England
- Denomination: Anglican

History
- Status: Parish Church
- Founded: 1719
- Dedication: The Holy Trinity
- Consecrated: 5 September 1719

Architecture
- Functional status: Preserved
- Heritage designation: Grade I listed
- Designated: 8 May 1950
- Style: Baroque
- Years built: 1718–1719
- Groundbreaking: 1718

Administration
- Diocese: Durham
- Parish: Sunderland

Holy Trinity Church (sometimes Church of the Holy Trinity or Sunderland Parish Church) is an Anglican church building in Sunderland, Tyne and Wear formerly the area's parish church. It was opened in 1719 as the church for the newly created Parish of Sunderland, and served the local community until dwindling numbers forced its closure in 1988. It has since been in the ownership of the Churches Conservation Trust who have preserved the space and converted it into a community cultural hub.

== History ==
=== Origins ===
In 1712, with the port of Sunderland growing rapidly, the local St. Michael's church at Bishopwearmouth was rapidly becoming too small to serve the growing population. Some local merchants came together and started an appeal to build a new church in the east end of the city, and a site on the town moor was chosen.

Because of the rapid growth of the population, it was also decided that a new parish should be created, and on 9 March 1719 an act of parliament was passed to create the Parish of Sunderland (thus the church is sometimes referred to as Sunderland Parish Church). The Bishop of Durham of the time, Nathaniel Crew gave his consent, as did Reverend James Bowes D.D.

==== Design ====
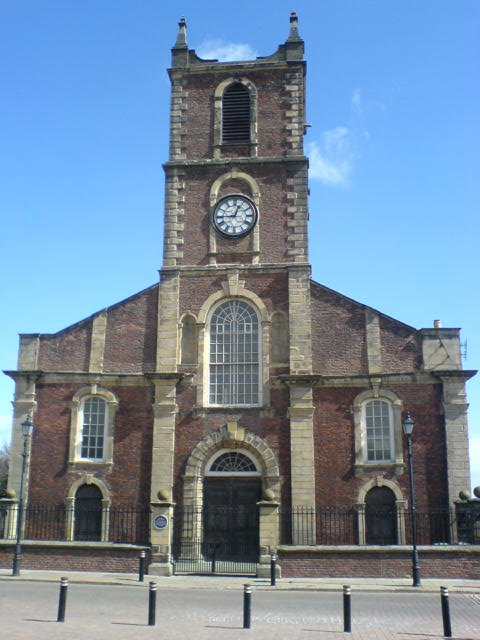
Western (front) elevation

The architect of the original church is not known for certain, although there are reports of involvement from William Eddy (a well-known local architect) and Daniel Newcombe, who would be appointed the first rector of the church.

The building itself has a Baroque style, brick built and with stone mouldings surrounding the doors and windows. The original building was without apse, although this would later be added (see below), and from the outside is described by Whellan as "plain and unprepossessing". (Note: Reported to feature in the 1894 edition of Whellan, as reported here.)

Inside, the building is described by Whellan as "handsome", with the aisles of pews being separated from the central nave by seven pillars on each side, each being capped with a corinthian-style capital. His full description reads:

The interior is handsome, and comprises a nave and chancel, and aisles, the latter of which are separated from the Nave by seven elegant pillars on each side, with Corinthian capitals. The communion table occupies a recess, covered by a dome supported in front by two Corinthian columns. There are galleries on each side, and at the west end of the nave; the front of the latter is charged with the royal arms, and those of Lord Crewe, Bishop of Durham. Above the gallery is a smaller one for the accommodation of the choir.

— William Whellan, History, Topography, and Directory of the County Palpatine of Durham...

==== Opening ====
Following the start of groundwork in 1718, the church building was completed the next year, such that on 5 September 1719 the consecration of the premises took place; prior to this, however, on 2 June 1719, the first recorded marriage took place at the church, of Jonathan Chambers and Elizabeth Hutchinson.

=== 1700s ===
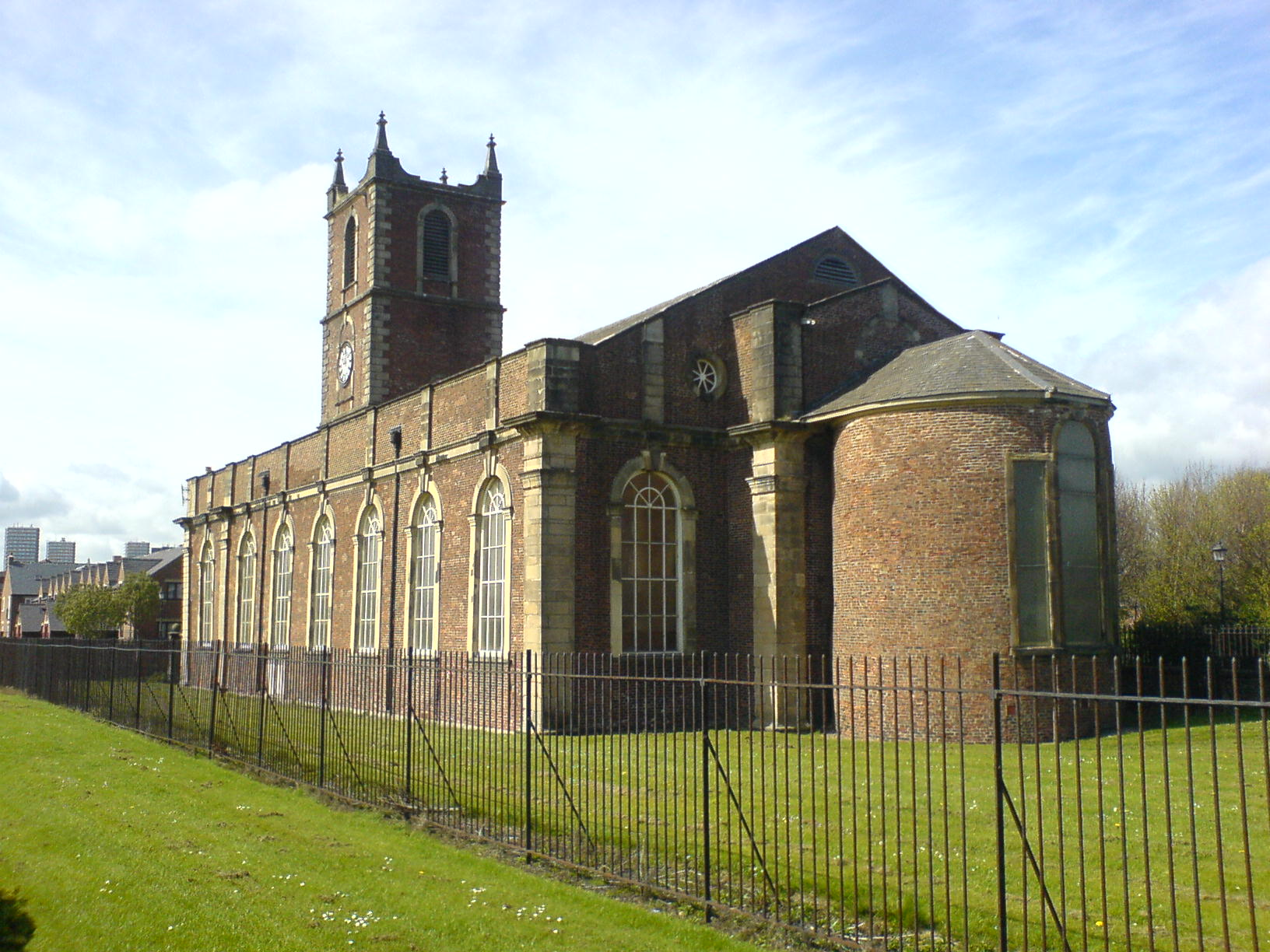
View of apse with tower in background

In 1735, Daniel Newcombe, the rector of the church who almost certainly had been involved in the original design of the building, decided to add an apse to the eastern end. This would give the building a chancel, which it had lacked until this point. The apse was large, near circular, and featuring a large venetian window; it still stands as part of the building today. Newcombe paid for the extension with his own money.

=== 1800s ===
The church started the nineteenth century with a new roof in 1803, which included its raising so that a new gallery could be added. (Note: Although there is not a consensus, Ross suggests that the side windows may have been added at this time also.) The windows were reglazed in the same year.

In 1854 the last burial in the graveyard took place.

A Venetian stained-glass window was added to the east side of the church in 1857. Manufactured by James Hartley's glassworks in Sunderland, it depicts the Ascension.

==== Jack Crawford Memorial ====
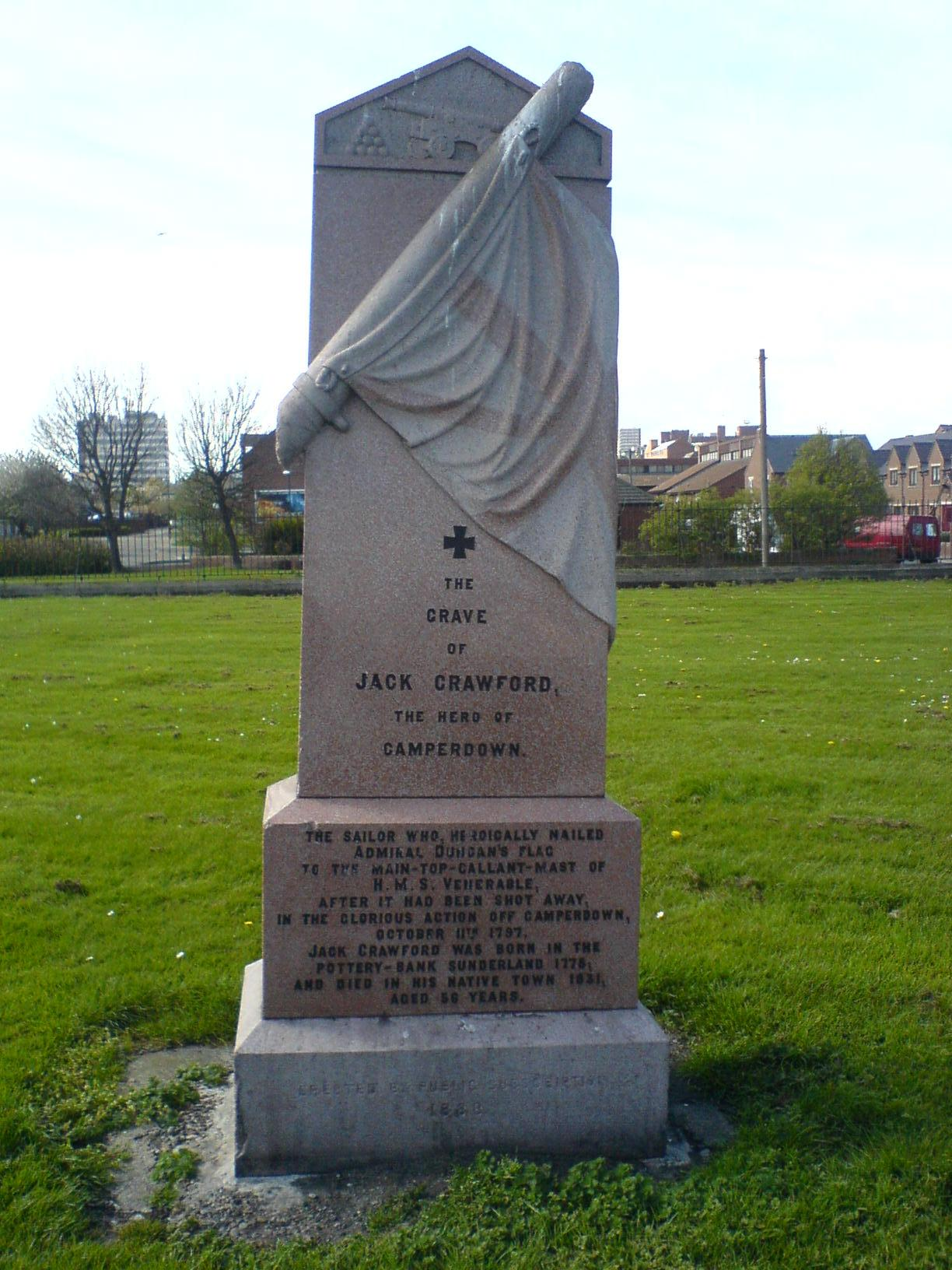
Jack Crawford memorial in the graveyard

Jack Crawford, the "Hero of Camperdown", was a sailor aboard HMS Venerable in 1797, during the Battle of Camperdown. Venerable took fire damaging its mast, which lowered the flag of Admiral Duncan – recognised as the sign of surrender – so Crawford scaled the remnants of the mast and nailed the Admiral's flag back to the top.

Crawford was well celebrated for his act of heroism, and the people of Sunderland awarded him a silver star. In the coming years, however, he fell into poverty and was killed by a cholera outbreak in 1831.

In 1888, Holy Trinity Church erected a headstone in its graveyard in his honour.

The sailor who heroically nailed Admiral Duncan's flag to the main-top-callant-mast of H.M.S. Venerable, after it had been shot away, in the glorious action off Camperdown, October 11th 1797.
Jack Crawford was born in the pottery-bank Sunderland 1775, and died in his native town 1831, aged 56 years.

— Jack Crawford Memorial, Holy Trinity Churchyard

This was followed two years later by a statue of commemoration in Mowbray Park.

=== 1900s ===
The 1900s started with the church being re-glazed, before community life began to degrade and the number of churchgoers in the east end of Sunderland diminished.

=== Closure ===
The congregation continued to diminish throughout the 20th century, until on 26 June 1988 the church was forced to close, and transferred to the Redundant Churches Fund (now known as the Churches Conservation Trust). The building itself needed extensive and costly repairs, and indeed to this day the Trust are still undertaking repairs.

The nearby church caretaker's cottage (formerly Donnison School, which closed at some point between 1905-1910) was Grade II listed in 1978, and became the Donnison School Heritage and Education Centre in 2007.

== Present day ==
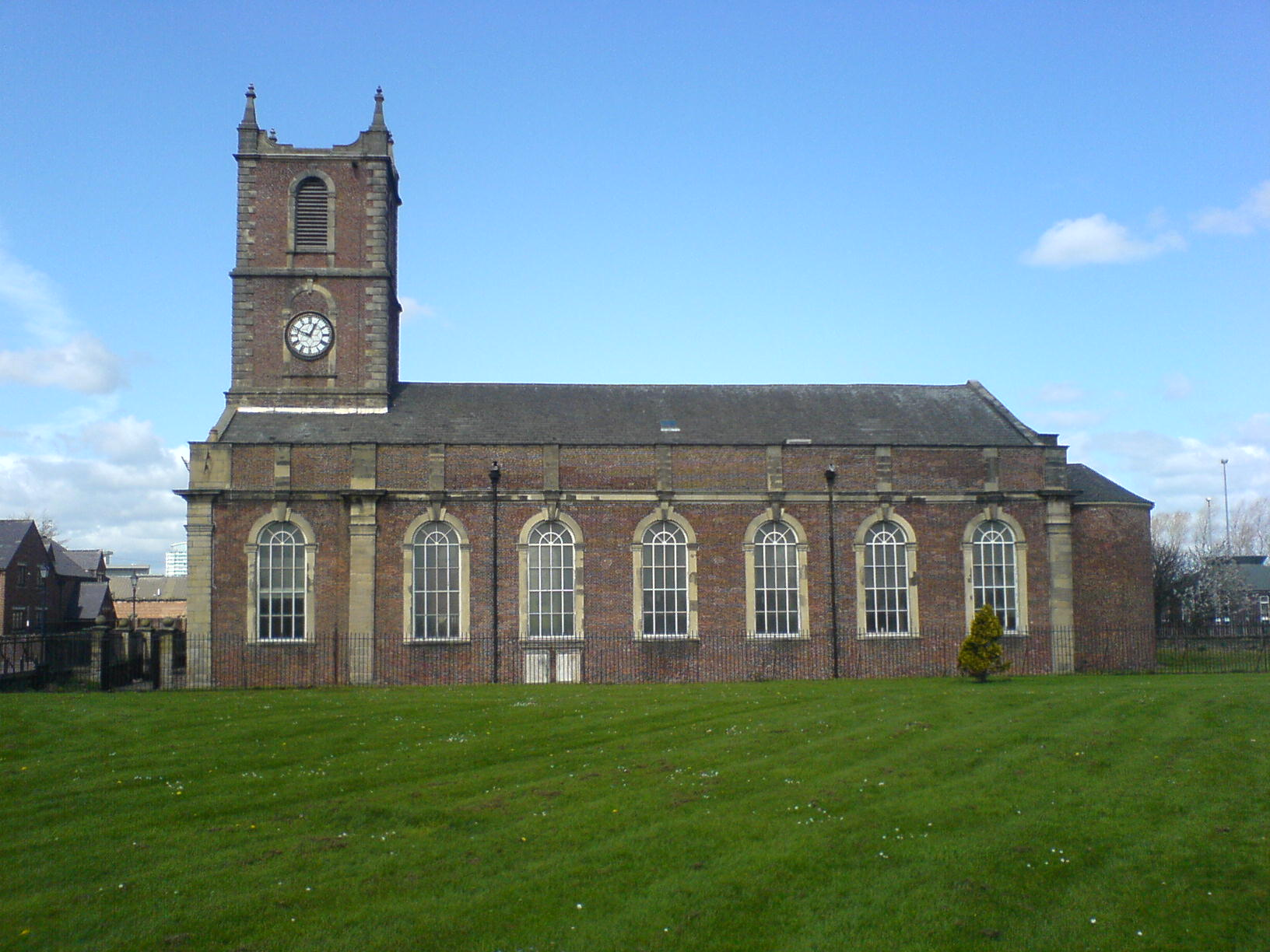
Southern (side) elevation

No longer in use as a place of worship, the building these days goes by the name of Seventeen Nineteen, a community venue and cultural arts centre.

== See also ==
- Grade I listed buildings in Tyne and Wear
- List of churches preserved by the Churches Conservation Trust in Northern England
