= Benakatti =

- Village
- Country: India
- State: Karnataka
- District: Bagalkot

Languages
  - Official: Kannada
- Time zone: UTC+5:30 (IST)
- ISO 3166 code: IN-KA

Benakatti can refer to either the village in Bagalkot district in the southern state of Karnataka, India; the village in Bagalkote district also in the southern state of Karnataka, India; or the surname of several families [Dasappanavar, Sannappanavar, Yadahalli, Bennur, Goudar, Patil, ETC with ancestral roots in these villages.
