= Bachinagudda =

Bachinagudda Bachinagudda, Pattadakalu
- Location within Karnataka
- Coordinates: 15.9484°N 75.8159°E
- Country: India
- State: Karnataka
- District: Bagalkot

Languages
  - Official: Kannada
- Time zone: UTC+5:30 (IST)
- Nearest city: Badami

Bachinagudda is in Pattadakal, Bagalkot District, in Karnataka, about 20 km from Badami, the Pre-Chalukya historical place and Archaeological sites in Karnataka. During 2003-04 and 2004-05 excavations were conducted at the cluster of four mounds (at the foot of Bachinagudda hill), the lower terrace, middle terrace, upper terrace and Reserve Forest. at Bachinagudda there is a Shankaralinga Temple.

Lower terrace

At Lower terrace found the evidence of an early medieval period brick temple (of Pre-Chalukya) including sandstone Chaturmukha Shiva head. From the remains of the temple found a cell on the west side and mandapa hall with 16 pillars, on the east side an entrance platform.

Middle terrace

At the middle terrace found the evidence of Iron age - Megalithic habitation (at the depth of 1.15 m) for the first time, including floors in good condition.

Upper terrace

At the upper terrace found the evidence of early historic includes the deposit fire places with ash-pits, rammed floor, consisting of roads, dumping area of waste products and smelting activity area. Iron and copper alloy implements, beads of semi-precious stones and glass. Pottery (russet coated ware, red polished ware and rouletted ware). The lead and copper coins were recovered from the floor levels, of the Maharathis and Satavahanas period.

== See also ==
- Pattadakal
- Badami
- Mahakuta
- Sidlaphadi
