= Ballur =

- Village
- Location in Karnataka, India Ballur (India)
- Coordinates: 16°24′N 75°34′E
- Country: India
- State: Karnataka
- District: Dharwad

Languages
  - Official: Kannada
- Time zone: UTC+5:30 (IST)

Ballur is a village in Bagalkot district of Karnataka, which is submerged in backwater of River Krishna (almatti Dam) India.
