= Kulageri =

- village
- Location in Karnataka, India Kulageri (India)
- Coordinates: 15°54′36″N 75°30′13″E
- Country: India
- State: Karnataka
- District: Bagalkot

Government
  - Type: Panchayat raj
  - Body: Gram panchayat

Languages
  - Official: Kannada
- Time zone: UTC+5:30 (IST)
- PIN: 587155
- ISO 3166 code: IN-KA
- Vehicle registration: KA
- Website: karnataka.gov.in

Kulageri is a village in Bagalkot district in Karnataka. The village has the population of 1,858.
