= Guledgudda =

- Town
- Location in Karnataka, India
- Coordinates: 16.05°N 75.8°E
- Country: India
- State: Karnataka
- District: Bagalkot

Government
  - Type: Town Municipal Council

Area
  - Total: 4.87 km^{2} (1.88 sq mi)
- Elevation: 515 m (1,690 ft)

Population (2001)
  - Total: 33,991
  - Density: 6,979.67/km^{2} (18,077.3/sq mi)

Languages
  - Official: Kannada
- Time zone: UTC+5:30 (IST)
- PIN: 587 203
- Telephone code: 08357
- Vehicle registration: KA-29
- Website: www.hungundtown.mrc.gov.in

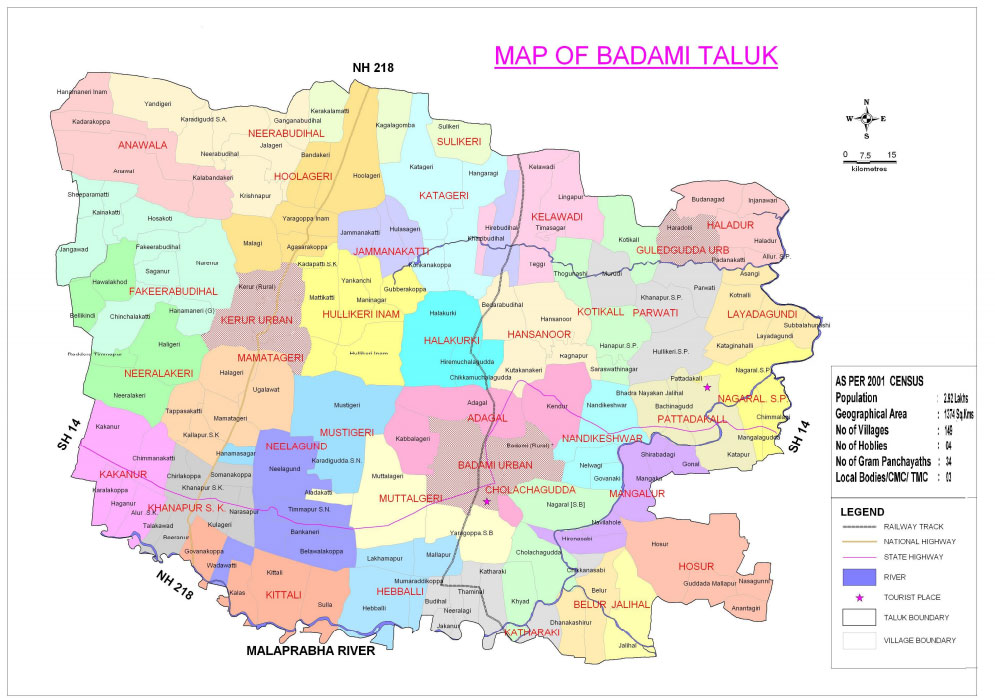
Badami Taluk Map before creation of Guledgud Taluk

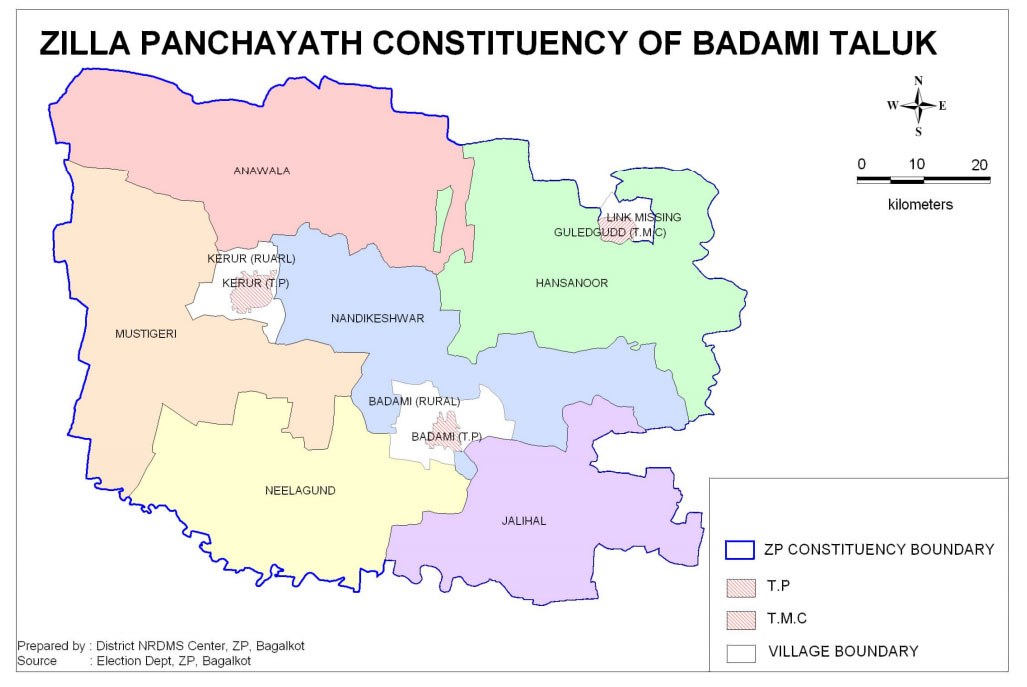
Badami Taluk ZP Constituency Map before creation of Guledgud Taluk

Guledgudda is a village in the Indian state of Karnataka. It was earlier a part of the Badami taluk, but is now the headquarters of the Guledgudda taluk in Bagalkot district.

== Demographics ==
As of the 2001 Indian census, Guledgudda had a population of 33,991. Males constituted 50% of the population and females 50%. Guledgudda had an average literacy rate of 66%, higher than the national average of 59.5%: male literacy was 76%, and female literacy was 55%. In Guledgudda, 12% of the population was under 6 years of age.
