= Sunderland Barracks =

- Sunderland
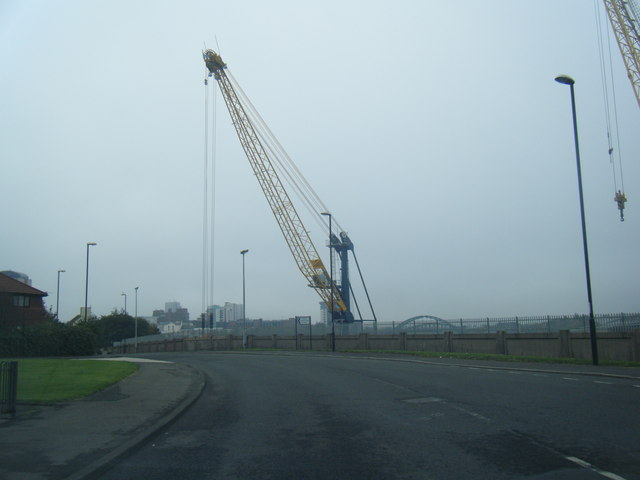
- Barrack Street, Sunderland: the barracks were demolished in the early 1930s

Site information
- Type: Barracks
- Owner: War Office
- Operator: British Army

Location
- Location within Tyne & Wear
- Coordinates: 54.911°N 1.368°W

Site history
- Built: 1794
- Built for: War Office
- In use: 1794-c.1910

Sunderland Barracks was a military installation in the old east end of Sunderland, built as part of the British response to the threat of the French Revolution.

== History ==
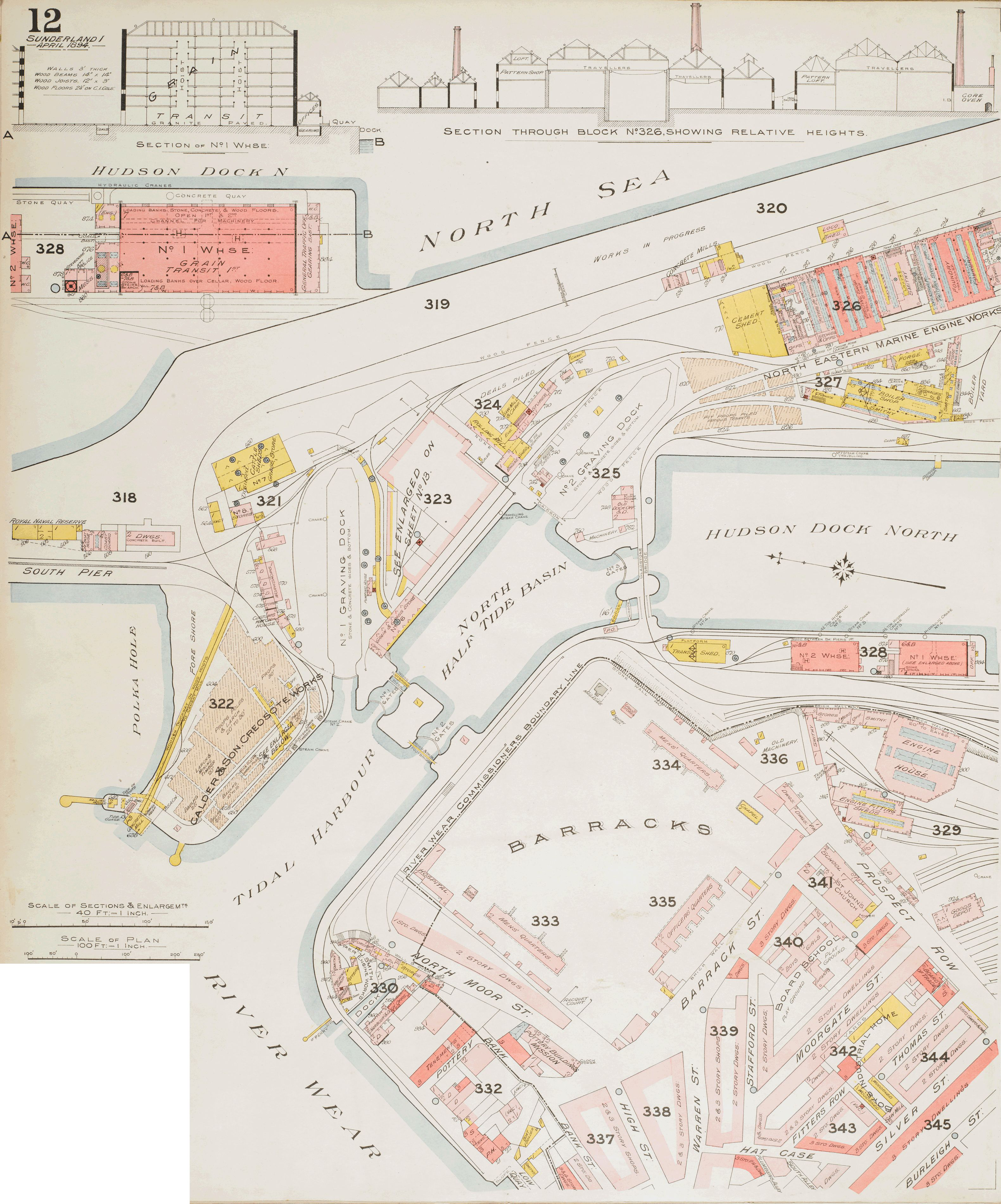
The barracks shown, alongside the entrance to the docks, on an insurance plan of 1894.

In early 1794 the Corporation of Sunderland petitioned for a barracks to be built in the town to protect the colliery trade from the possibility of a French attack; and they provided land for this purpose alongside the Town Moor. (At the time there were already several regiments of infantry in Sunderland, billeted in local inns and houses.) A further request in April, voicing concerns about labour unrest in the mines and rumours of a mutinous militia unit in Newcastle, resulted in the Barrack Department receiving a direct order from the Duke of York to build barracks for a thousand men. The barracks, which were designed by Thomas Neill, were built with speed using timber construction and were ready and occupied by July that same year. They stood at one end of the High Street, which ran for almost a mile between the barracks in the east and Bishopwearmouth Church in the west. Initially, they were located at the tip of the headland where the River Wear met the sea (with a mid-18th-century gun battery positioned beyond the barracks to seaward) until, in the 1840s, Hudson Dock was built on reclaimed land to the east.

When opened, Sunderland Barracks included accommodation for 1,528 infantry troops, housed in 19 large barrack rooms each sleeping 36 men in double berths; there were also twenty sergeants' rooms, each with bunks for four men. In 1803 an 80-bed hospital was added. The soldiers' quarters were rebuilt using brick construction between 1826 and 1828. The 18th-century church of St John, which stood next to the barracks gates, served the barracks as a garrison church between 1823 and 1919.

In 1873 a system of recruiting areas based on counties was instituted under the Cardwell Reforms and the barracks became the depot for the 68th (Durham) Regiment of Foot and the 106th Regiment of Foot (Bombay Light Infantry).

Following the Childers Reforms and the formation of the Durham Light Infantry from the amalgamation of the 68th and 106th Regiments of Foot in 1881, the Durham Light Infantry moved out of the barracks and established its depot at Fenham Barracks in Newcastle upon Tyne in 1884. After that the Sunderland Barracks were mainly used by Royal Artillery units. By the turn of the century many of the barracks built in the late 18th century were in poor condition and in May 1909, the War Office started considering disposal of the Sunderland site. The barracks were decommissioned shortly thereafter and demolished in the early 1930s to make way for Corporation Quay.
