= 106 Squadron SAAF =

106 Squadron
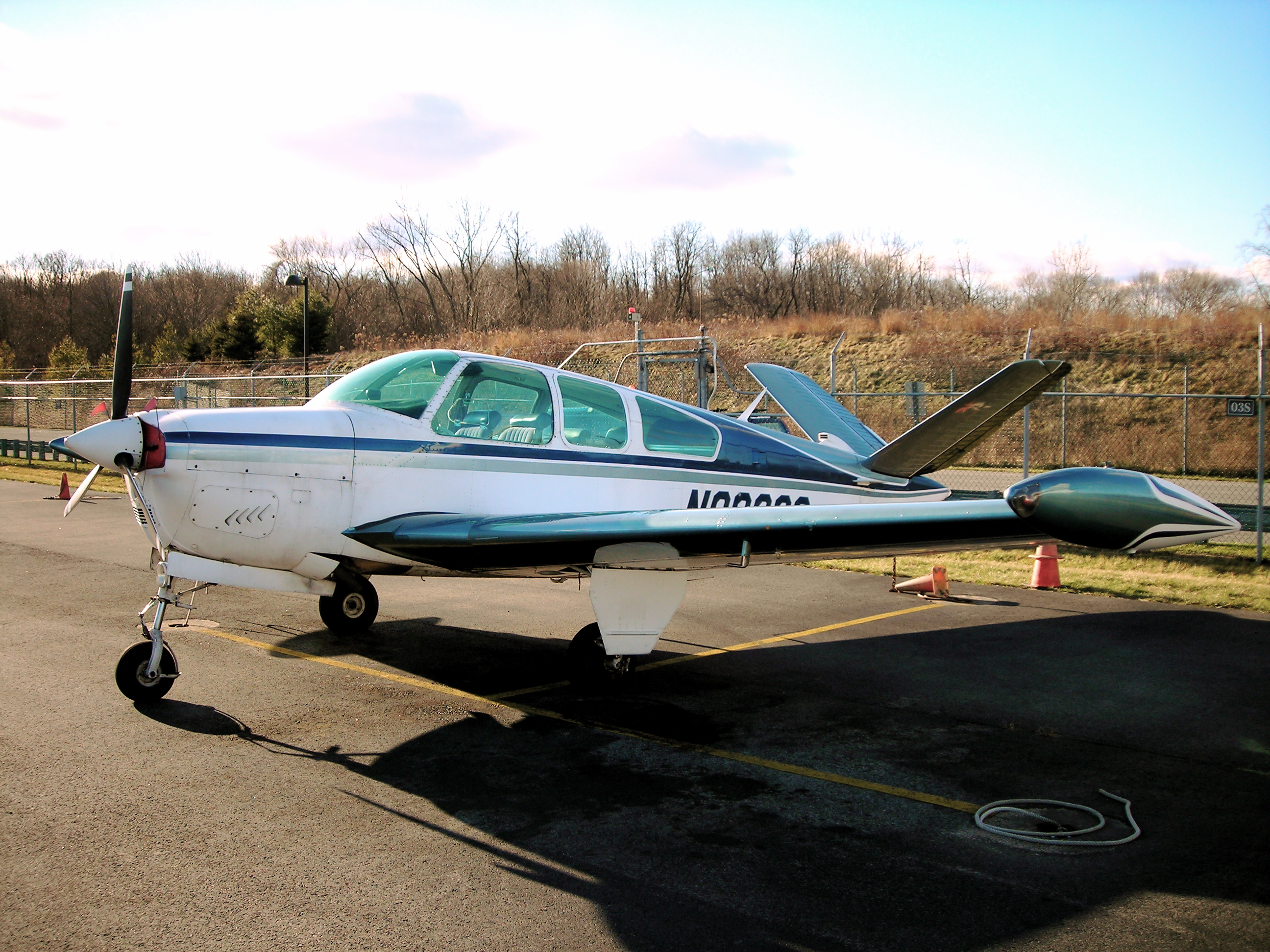
- The squadron uses privately owned civilian aircraft. Example of a Beechcraft Bonanza similar to that found among the wide range of aircraft used.
- Country: South Africa
- Branch: South African Air Force
- Role: Police operation assistance in the Free State.
- Garrison/HQ: AFB Bloemspruit

106 Squadron is a territorial reserve squadron of the South African Air Force. The squadron operations include coastal reconnaissance, command and control and radio relay in crime prevention operations in cooperation with the South African Police. The squadron is based at AFB Bloemspruit. Members of the squadron typically come from nearby areas, so that their knowledge of their patrol area can be utilized in crime prevention.
