= 106th Brigade =

In military terms, 106th Brigade or 106th Infantry Brigade may refer to:

== British India ==
- 106th Indian Infantry Brigade, a redesignation of the 1st Burma Infantry Brigade

== Germany ==
- 106th Panzer Brigade

== Libya ==
- 106th Brigade (Libya), a military unit of the Libyan National Army

== Ukraine ==
- 106th Territorial Defense Brigade, a unit of the Ukrainian Territorial Defense Forces

== United Kingdom ==
- 106th Brigade (United Kingdom), a British Army formation during World War I
- 106th Brigade, Royal Field Artillery, a British Army unit during World War I
- 106th (Lancashire Yeomanry) Brigade, Royal Field Artillery, a British Army unit after World War I

== United States ==
- 106th Theater Signal Brigade, a signal command of the US Army

== See also ==
- 106th Division (disambiguation)
- 106th Regiment (disambiguation)
