= Rabkavi Banhatti =

Rabakavi Banhatti ರಬಕವಿ ಬನಹಟ್ಟಿ
- City
- Taluk Rabkavi -Banahatti
- Rabakavi Banahatti Taluk Map
- Nickname: Taluk Rabkavi - Banahatti
- Location in Karnataka, India
- Coordinates: 16.47°N 75.12°E
- Taluk Rabkavi - Banahatti: India
- State: Karnataka
- District: Bagalkot
- Taluka: Rabkavi -Banahatti

Area
  - Total: 15.5 km^{2} (6.0 sq mi)
  - Rank: 1
- Elevation: 550 m (1,800 ft)

Population (2011)
  - Total: 77,004
  - Rank: 1
  - Density: 5,619/km^{2} (14,550/sq mi)
- Time zone: UTC+5:30 (IST)
- PIN: 587311, 587314
- Telephone code: 08353
- Vehicle registration: KA 48(Jamakhandi RTO)

Rabkavi Banhatti is a town situated on the bank of River Krishna. It was declared a taluka by Karnataka State Govt. on 15 March 2017 and it became operational from 01-Jan-2018. It comes under Jamkhandi subdivision. It has a city municipal council in the Bagalkot district of the Indian state of Karnataka. It forms twin city along with Rabakavi, Rampur and Hosur. It is a hub of the textile business for the surrounding districts.

Rabkavi Banhatti is located about 18 km to the west of Jamkhandi subdivision. The town area comprises four places: Rabkavi, Banhatti, Hosur and Rampur. In 1952, the municipalities of Rabkavi and Banhatti were merged into one municipality. The place is very famous for its power-loomed and hand-loomed sarees. Rabkavi-Banhatti has more than 22000 power looms which is one of the highest in Karnataka.

The 28th Kannada Sahithya Sammelana was held in Rabakavi in 1944, under the presidency of Shi.Shi. Basavanala.

The famous temples of the town are Shri Mahadev temple, Danamma Devi Temple (Rabkavi), Shri Shankarling temple, Shri Gurudeva Brahmanandam Ashram and Shri Kadasiddeshwara temple (Banhatti). A fair is conducted every Shravan Maasa in Rabkavi and Bhadrapada Maasa in Banhatti.

== Demographics ==
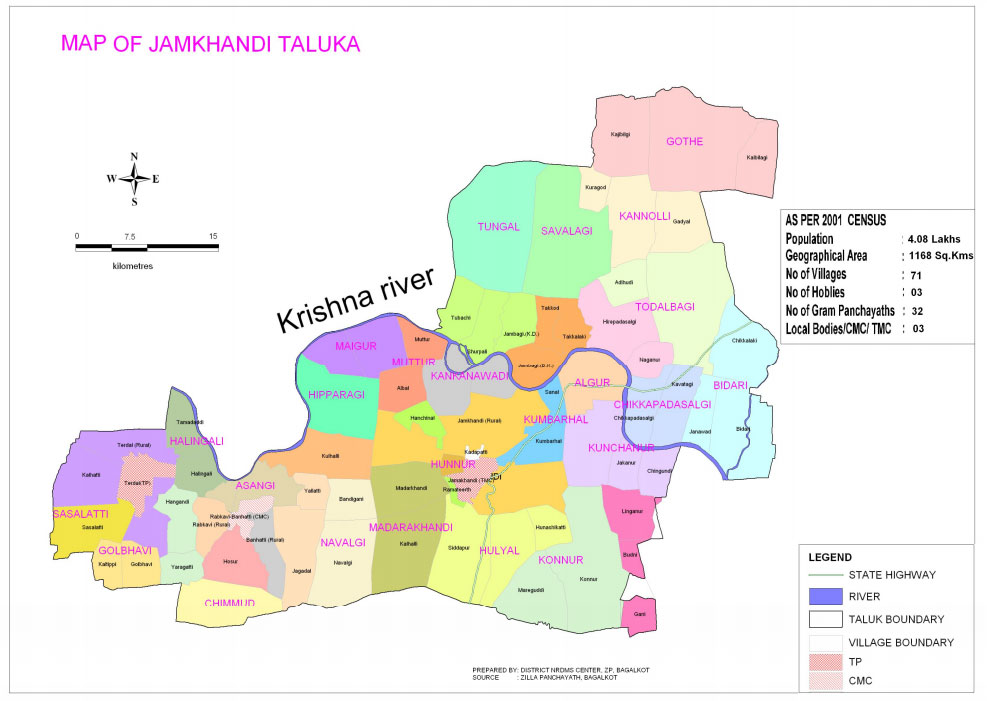
Jamkhandi Taluk Map before creation of Terdal and Rabkavi-Banhatti Taluk

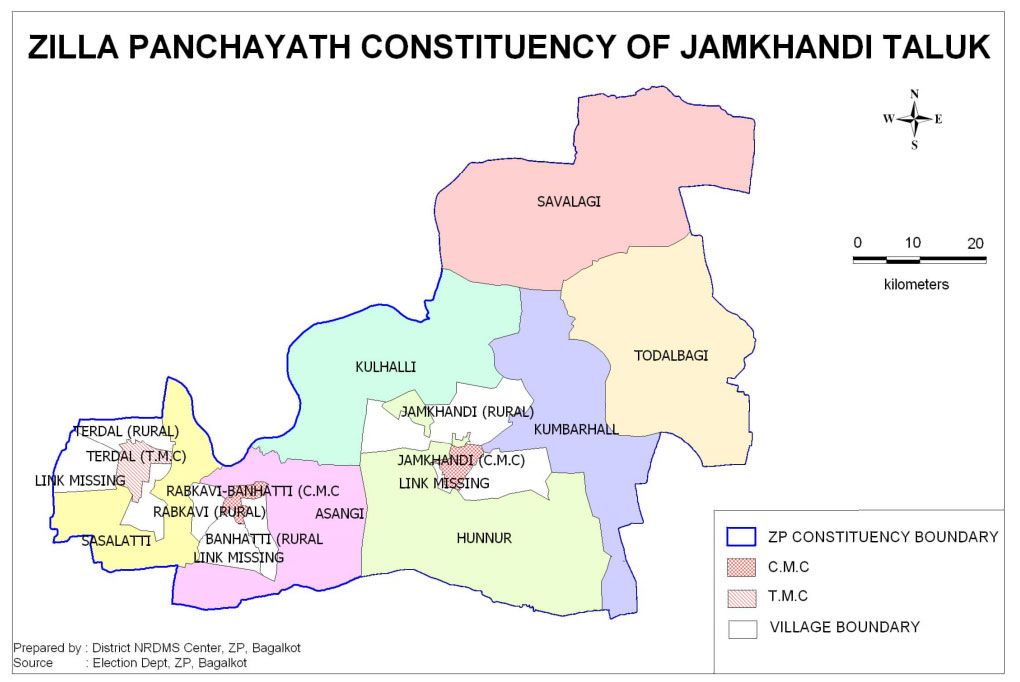
Jamkhandi Taluk ZP Constituency Map before creation of Terdal and Rabkavi-Banhatti Taluk

Males constituted 51% of the population and females 49%. Rabkavi Banhatti has an average literacy rate of 58%, lower than the national average of 59.5%: male literacy was 67%, and female literacy was 49%. In Rabkavi Banhatti, 13% of the population was under 6 years of age.

Travel from Banhatti to Bengaluru takes around 13 hours by train and 17–18 hours by bus.

== Economy ==
Banahatti has a co-operative spinning mill named 'Banahatti Co-operative Spinning Mill Ltd., Banahatti,' established in 1983-84 that operating on its own funds. It runs all year generating jobs to many unemployed people. The main occupation of the people in Banhatti is the manufacturing of sarees and the allied activities like saree folding, dyeing, yarn rolling, etc.

The weaving business has recently experienced a growth larger than ever in history; sarees being produced are sent to bigger markets like Bangalore, Dharwad, Mangalooru, Gulbarga and also to Maharashtra, Tamil Nadu, Andhra Pradesh, Kerala.

== Education ==
There are many schools and colleges in Rabkavi Banhatti. Some of the famous School and colleges are Basaveshwar Kannada Medium School, S.R.A Composite PU College, Banahatti and Sri M V Pattan, College in Rabkavi. which is situated in Banhatti, Konnur and Science PU College in Yallatti. Other popular schools situated nearby are Poorna Prajna English Medium School - Rampur, Jnyanodaya English Medium School - Rampur, Padmavati International School - Rabkavi.

== Culture ==
Sri Kadasidhheshwar Temple is the main temple of the town and considered as "Town God." A fair called 'Banhatti Jatre' is conducted yearly in the month of September or October. A part of enthusiastic celebrations during the fair is the lighting of the fire crackers. The other temples are namely Sri Mallikarjuna Temple, Hanuman Temple, Veerbhadreshwar Temple, Yallamma Temple, Sri Basaveshwar Temple, Kali Temple, Lakshmi Temple and many more.

Banahatti has three theaters namely Vaibhav, Shringar and Mallikarjun theatres. Government Rabkavi-Banahatti is one of 57 Karnataka cities in the Nirmala Nagara - Municipal eGovernance project. On 15 August 2005, each of the cities got a comprehensive website as well as the Public Grievance & Redressal module. Other important modules launched are Property Tax, Financial Accounting, GIS Mapping, Birth & Death Certification, and Ward Works. Nirmala Nagara project is a partnership between the Urban Development Dept, eGovernments Foundation & Survey of India. These computer-based systems coupled with government process re-engineering and GIS digital mapping will provide transparency and accountability and smoother delivery of services to citizens of Karnataka.
