= 106th Infantry Regiment (PA) =

- Active: January 1942 – May 1942
- Disbanded: May 12, 1942
- Countries: Philippines
- Allegiance: United States Army; Philippine Commonwealth Army
- Branch: Army
- Type: Light Infantry
- Role: Army Reserve
- Size: 500
- Part of: Zamboanga Force
- Garrison/HQ: Fort Pilar, Zamboanga
- Equipment: M1917 Enfield Rifles; M1918 Browning Automatic Rifles; M1923 Thompson Submachineguns
- Engagements: Battle of Zamboanga

Commanders
- Notable commanders: Major Jose Garcia

106th Infantry Regiment is a reserve unit of the Philippine Commonwealth Army activated in January 1942 to augment the forces in Mindanao. It was attached to Zamboanga Force under Lieutenant Colonel William F. Dalton and later Lieutenant Colonel Alvin T. Wilson.

== Background ==
Units raised in Zamboanga were transferred to Central Mindanao 101st Infantry and 102nd Infantry. By January 1942 only the Provisional Battalion, 43rd US Infantry (PS) was left to defend the sector as 2nd Battalion, 102nd Infantry under Major William Baldwin was transferred to Cagayan Sector. Colonel Dalton, the sector commander, raised another regiment from students and volunteers in the city.

In late January 1st Battalion, 102nd Infantry was brought by Major Alvin T. Wilson for a refresher training. However, General Sharp Mindanao Force Commander ordered Colonel Dalton and the Provisional Battalion, 43rd US Infantry under Major Allen Peck to transfer to Bukidnon to set up a training school with the Philippine Scouts as instructor, leaving only 1/102nd Infantry, 2 PC Companies, and trainees in the sector.

The trainees were organized into a battalion and named 1st Battalion, 106th Infantry under commander Major Jose D. Garcia. The soldiers of this battalion mostly came from the city, and their main mission was to secure Wolfe Field for use as bomber base. However, before the completion of its construction, the Japanese landed in mid February 1942 and captured the field. This prevented the regiment from organizing another battalion to expand the regiment.

=== Japanese Landing ===
Along with 1/102nd Infantry and PC Company under Captain Juan Crisologo, PC the 1st Battalion, 106th Infantry comprised the Zamboanga Force under Lieutenant Colonel Alvin T. Wilson. Later, Major Lawrence Pritchard was sent from Mindanao Force Headquarters to become its Executive Officer. Preparations were ongoing and defensive plans were made to prevent the capture of Wolfe Field, but the lack of weapons, ammunition, and artillery made this an impossible task.

On February 26, the 1942 Japanese 3rd Southern Expeditionary Fleet under Vice Admiral Fugiyama Rokuzo appeared in the coast of Zamboanga. A landing force under Rear Admiral Infune Naosaburo landed on the beaches. With no artillery, the Zamboanga Force opted not to meet the invaders at the beach, and Zamboanga Force troops were ordered to retreat to the hills. On March 2, 1st Battalion, 106th counterattacked and almost succeed in retaking the city, however with naval and seaplane support they were repelled. The battalion was relegated to raiding for supplies during the rest of the War, before surrender was ordered on May 11, 1942.

== See also ==
- Japanese invasion of Zamboanga
- Mindanao Force
