= 106th Regiment of Foot (1794) =

British Army infantry regiment

The 106th Regiment of Foot was an infantry regiment of the British Army from 1794 to 1795. It was raised in May 1794 at Norwich, and was disbanded in 1795.
