= Kaladgi =

Village in Karnataka, India

Kaladagi Kaladhagi, Kaladagi
- village
- Location in Karnataka, India Kaladagi (India)
- Coordinates: 16.204°N 75.5°E
- Country: India
- State: Karnataka
- District: Bagalkot
- Taluka: Bagalkot

Government
  - Type: Panchayati raj (India)
  - Body: Gram panchayat

Languages
  - Official: Kannada
- Time zone: UTC+5:30 (IST)
- PIN: 587 204
- Telephone code: 08354
- ISO 3166 code: IN-KA
- Vehicle registration: KA-29, KA48
- Website: www.karnataka.gov.in

Kaladgi is a panchayat village in the Bagalkot Taluk, Bagalkot District of Karnataka State and is located about 25 km by road west of the town of Bagalkot. Kaladgi is well known for its fruit gardens.

== History ==
In the initial stages of the British regime, cavalry was stationed here by the Southern Maharashtra Jahgirdars. It was found to be a very suitable place for the movement of troops. After the war, in 1864 it was made the district headquarters. According to the Imperial Gazetteer of India (Vol.7 p. 314), Kaladgi had a population of 7,024 in 1881, including 4,420 Hindus, 2,521 Muslims, 19 Jains and 58 Christians. In 1884 the district headquarters was shifted to Bijapur. Several old buildings and tombs of the British days, still remain at this place. The town has a town Panchayat and a Khadi production Unit.

== Geography ==
Kaladgi gram panchayat area is bounded on the north by the banks of the Ghataprabha River, to the east is the Chikka-Shellikeri gram panchayat area, to the south is the Yandageri village area of Badami Taluka, and to the west is the Khajidoni gram panchayat area.

== Transport ==
Kaladgi is well connected by road. Karnataka State highway 20 passes through Kaladgi. The National Highway 52 (India) passing through Bagalkot (Gaddangiri Cross) connects at about 12 km and another National Highway 50 (India) passing through Bagalkot (Ilkal, Hunagund) connect at 50 km. The nearest Railway station is Bagalkot. All these modes of transports connects Kaladgi to Hubli, Bijapur, Raichur and Belgaum by road and connects Kaladgi to Gadag and Bijapur by train.

== Other ==
Kaladgi is famous for fruits like Pomegranates, Sapota, Grapes etc. These fruits are exported all over India as well abroad, Shri Bapurao L Chavhan his One of the famous fruits grower.

Kaladgi has a very well known temple called Sri Gurulingeswara Matha. Late shri shri shri Chandrashekhara Swamiji was Guru/Swamiji of this temple. Also in this place is a fine temple of Basavanna, built out of famous Shellikeri Blackstone.

It also has some British Officers Tombs, it also has few foreign visitors searching for ancestral leftovers.

This village will be submerged in the Almatti Dam Project. The new location is yet to be developed.

The Father of Indian armed rebellion & first revolutionary freedom fighter of India Vasudev Balavant Phadke was captured in a temple here after a fierce fight with the British.
