= Town Moor, Sunderland =

Park in Sunderland, England

Coordinates: 54°54′26″N 1°21′55″W

The Town Moor is a large common land located in the East End of Sunderland, otherwise known as Hendon.

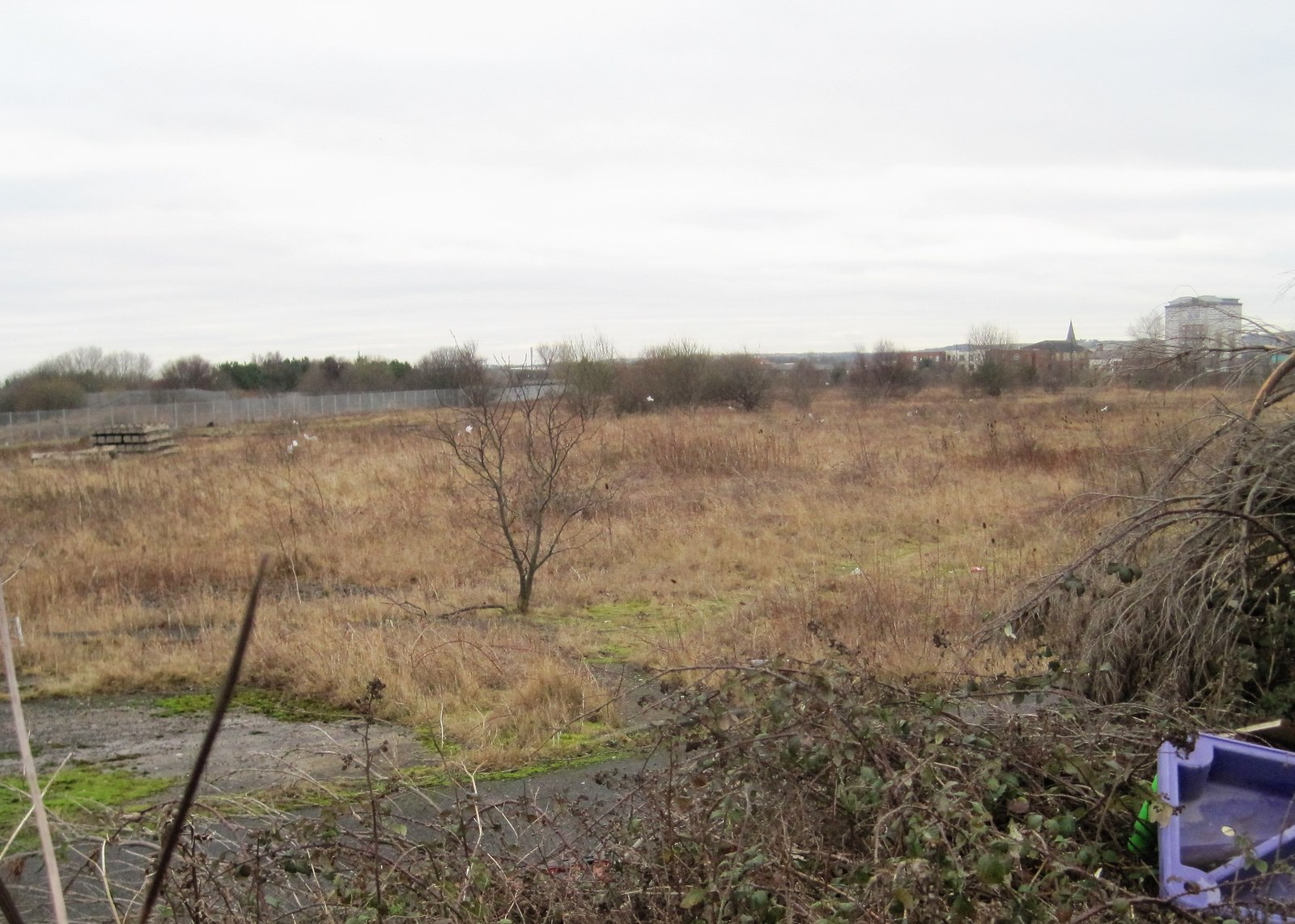
The site of the Former Railway Station on the Town Moor

First established as a public common in 1718 alongside the creation of the Holy Trinity Church and the new parish of Sunderland, the space what is now the Town Moor was once significantly larger and served a variety of purposes throughout its history. This included industrial activities such as limestone, clay quarrying and rope-making, as well as sporting activities such as bull, badger and bear baiting. The Sunderland Barracks were built on the edge of the Town Moor in the late 18th century.

The land was also host to a former railway station which sat the terminus of the Durham–Sunderland line.
